= 1490s =

Decade

The 1490s decade ran from January 1, 1490, to December 31, 1499.

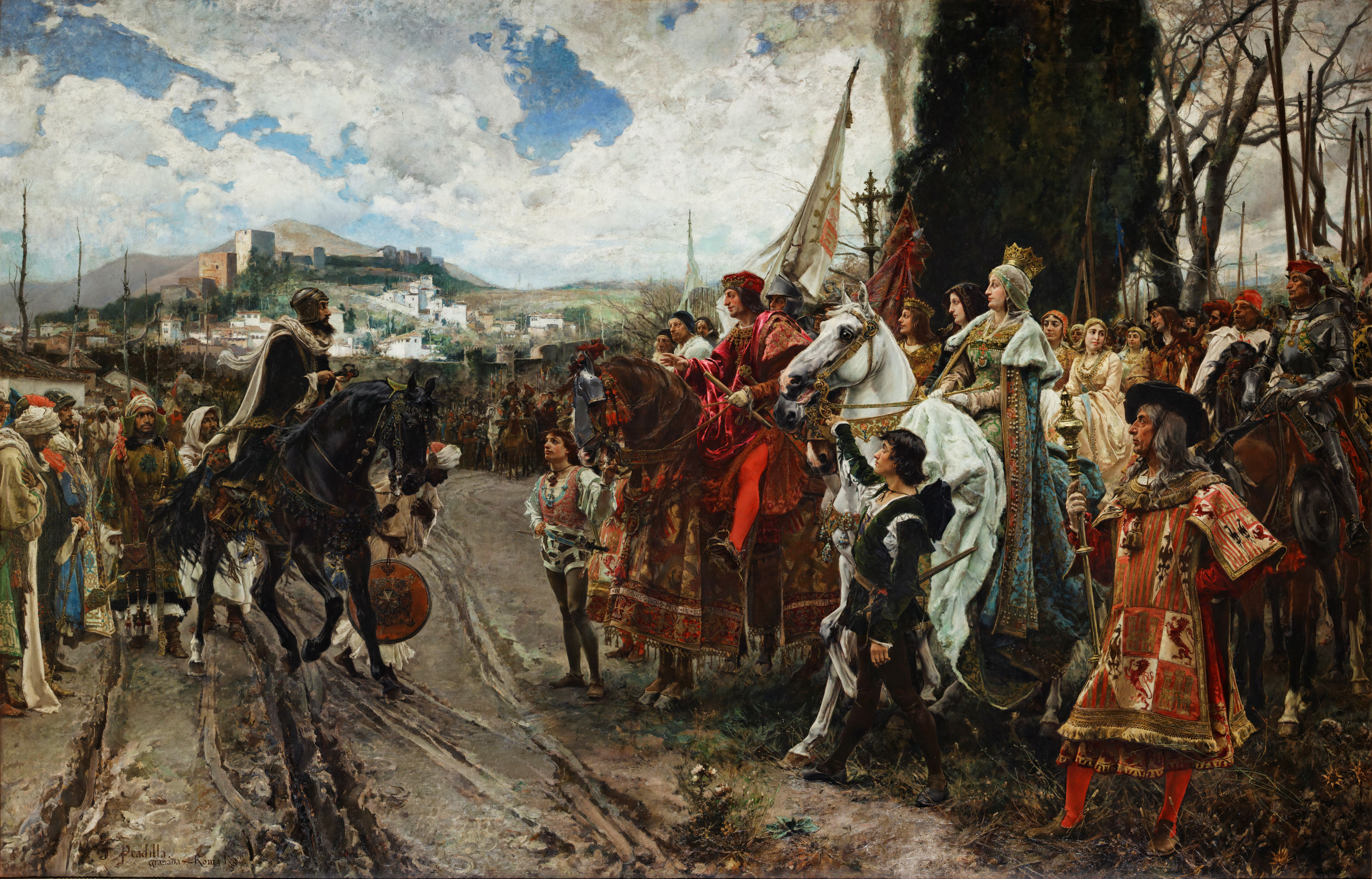
January 2, 1492 – Muhammad XI, last Moorish Emir of Granada, surrenders his city to the army of Ferdinand and Isabella.

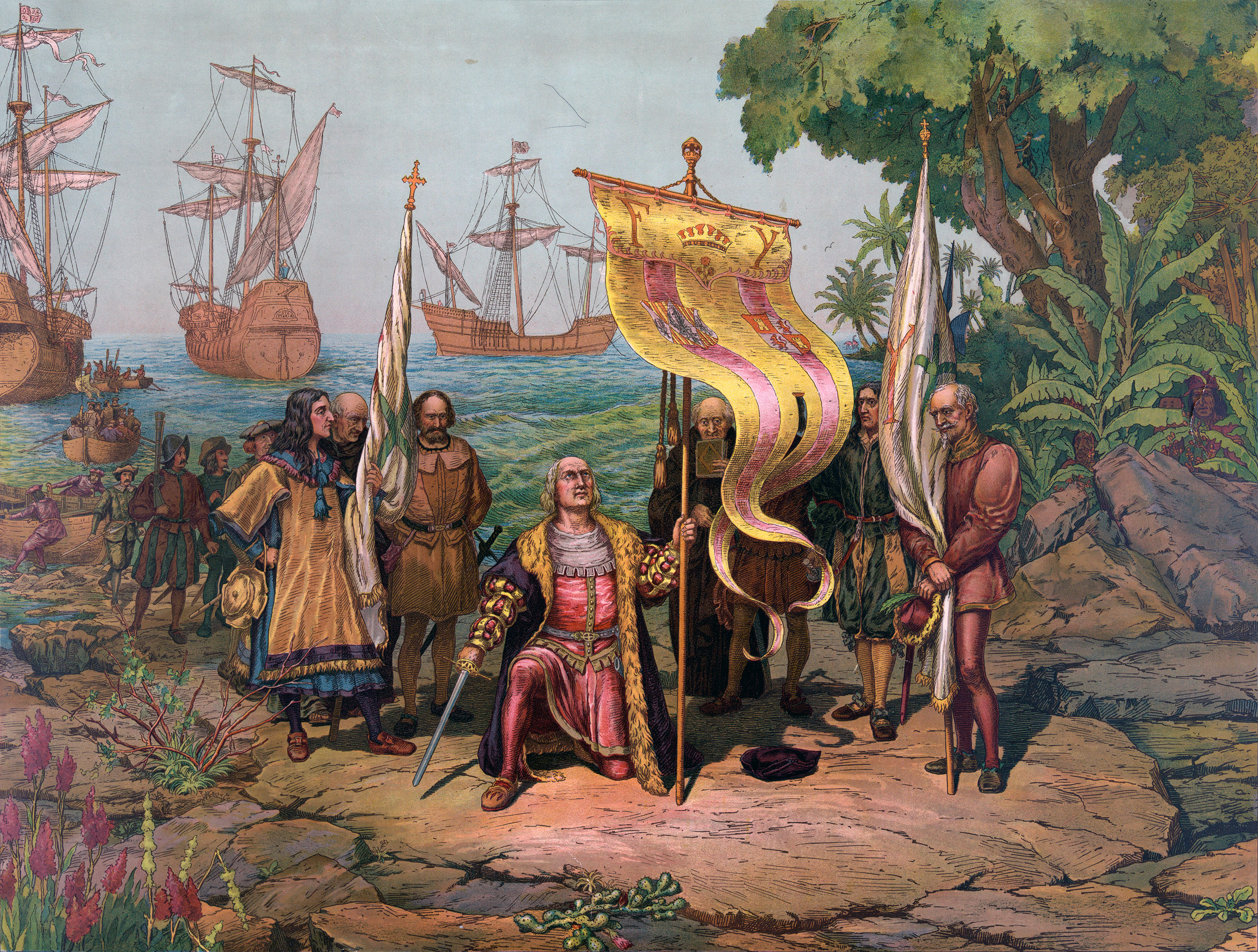
October 12, 1492 – Columbus discovers the Americas for Spain.

== Events ==
=== 1490 ===
==== January–March ====
- January 4 – Anne of Brittany announces that all those who ally themselves with the king of France will be considered guilty of the crime of Lèse-majesté.
- February 3 – The Scottish Parliament opens in Edinburgh to address matters of lands confiscated in the year before.
- February 5 – Robert Lyle, 2nd Lord Lyle, is restored by Scotland's King James IV to his previous title of Scottish nobility that had been forfeited on July 4, the previous year when he had sided against King James III in the fighting against the current monarch, King James IV.
- February 15 – The Scottish Parliament passes an Act to restore lands forfeited by the losers in the war between the supporters of the late King James III against his son, the reigning King James IV, and nullifying transfers of land made to new owners after the forfeitures.
- March 13 – Carlo Giovanni Amedeo becomes Duke of Savoy at nine months old upon the death of his father, Carlo I di Savoia. his mother, Bianca di Monferrato, serves as regent.
- March or April – 1490 Qingyang event, a presumed meteor shower or air burst over Qingyang in the Gansu province in Ming dynasty China. Some later accounts liste casualties of more than 10,000 people. The only date given for the Qingyang event is that it was in "the third lunar month" on the Chinese lunar calendar coinciding with a period beginning on March 12 and ending on April 19, 1490.

==== April–June ====
- April 6 – Matthias Corvinus, King of Hungary and Croatia, including part of Austria, dies unexpectedly at Vienna. Four people claim the throne before the Hungarian nobility assembles to elect the successor to King Matthias, and begin the War of the Hungarian Succession
- May 28 – At Junnar in what is now India's Maharashtra state, the Ahmadnagar Sultanate is established by Ahmad Nizam Shah, who leads a secession of his land from the Bahmani Kingdom and defeats the Bahmani General Jahangir Khan.
- June 15 – English printer William Caxton prints his English language translation of the French book, Ars moriendi, which he renders as The art and crafte to knowe well to dye.

==== July–September ====
- July 4 – John Corvinus, son of the late King Matthias Corvinus of Hungary and a claimant to the throne, is defeated by the Kingdom of Hungary at the Battle of Bonefield.
- July 13 – John of Kastav finishes a cycle of frescoes in the Holy Trinity Church, Hrastovlje (modern-day southwestern Slovenia).
- July 15 – King Vladislaus of Bohemia is proclaimed as the new King of Hungary by a majority of the Hungarian nobility, prompting the Holy Roman Emperor Maximilian to plan an invasion and conquest of the Hungarian Kingddom.
- July 22 – (5th day of 7th month of Entoku 2) At Heian-kyō, in Japan, now Kyoto, Ashikaga Yoshitane becomes the 10th Muromachi shōgun of Japan, more than a year after the death of his cousin, Ashikaga Yoshihisa.
- August 10 – The Scottish Admiral Sir Andrew Wood of Largo, commanding the warships Flower and Yellow Carrel, successfully repels an attempted ambush by three armed English merchant ships at the Firth of Forth. Wood captures the three ships, carries them up the Dundee river and presents them and their crews to King James IV. After a "an earnest remonstrance" to England's King Henry VII about allowing the Englishmen to attempt a battle, King James sets the prisoners free and returns them to England.
- September 18 – The coronation of Vladislaus II as King of Hungary takes place at Székesfehérvár.

==== October–December ====
- October 21 – The Massacre of Monzievaird takes place in Scotland at the county Perthshire, with 20 members of Clan Murray being killed when members of Clan Drummond and Clan Campbell set fire to the church where the Murrays have assembled.
- November 20 – The first edition of the chivalric romance Tirant lo Blanch, by Joanot Martorell, is printed in Valencia.
- December 19 – Anne of Brittany is married by proxy to Maximilian I, Holy Roman Emperor.

==== Date unknown ====
- Perkin Warbeck claims to be the son of King Henry VII of England, at the court of Burgundy.
- Traditional date of the Battle of Glendale (Skye) between the Scottish clans MacDonald and MacLeod.
- Catholic missionaries arrive in the African Kingdom of Kongo.
- Pêro da Covilhã arrives in Ethiopia.
- Regular postal service connects the Habsburg residences of Mechelen and Innsbruck, the first in Germany.
- Leonardo da Vinci observes capillary action, in small-bore tubes.
- Leonardo da Vinci develops an oil lamp: the flame is enclosed in a glass tube, placed inside a water-filled glass globe.
- All Saints' Church, the Schlosskirche in Wittenberg, is begun.
- Tirant lo Blanch, by Joanot Martorell and Martí Joan de Galba, is published.
- Aldus Manutius moves to Venice.
- John Colet receives his M.A. from Magdalen College, Oxford.
- Johann Reuchlin meets Giovanni Pico della Mirandola.
- Merchants carry coffee from Yemen to Mecca (approximate date).
- Battle of Chocontá: The northern (zaque) tribes of the pre-Columbian Muisca Confederation (central Colombia) are beaten by the southern (zipa) tribes.

=== 1491 ===
==== January–March ====
- January 2 – After his failed attempt to marry Anne, Duchess of Brittany, Breton General Alain I of Albret signs the Treaty of Moulins and pledges support to King Charles VIII of France in return for the rights to the Breton city of Nantes. The French–Breton War resumes.
- February 2 – At Stettin (now Szczecin in Poland) Bogislaw X, Duke of Pomerania, marries Anna Jagiellon, daughter of King Casimir IV.
- February 13 – A tsunami occurs off of the coast of New Zealand, later believed to be caused by a meteor impact that created what is referred to as the "Mahuika crater" on the New Zealand continental shelf.
- February 20 – Jan I Olbracht, son of King Casimir IV or Poland and, like his older brother Vladislaus, a claimant to the throne of the Kingdom of Hungary, renounces all of his claims in return for the Duchy of Głogów.
- March 19 – Having defected to France, Alain I of Albret captures the Château des ducs de Bretagne, the royal palace of Brittany's capital, Nantes, after the Breton regent, the Marshal Jean IV de Rieux, leads the evacuation of Breton officials.

==== April–June ====
- April 4 King Charles VIII makes a triumphant entry to the city of Nantes, facing no resistance and marking the conquest of the Duchy of Brittany by France.
- April 23 – The city of Granada, capital of the Muslim Emirate of Granada in Spain, is besieged by the armies of Castile and Aragon, ruled by the Catholic Monarchs of Spain, Ferdinand and Isabella.
- May 3 – The ruler of the Kingdom of Kongo, Nkuwu Nzinga, is baptised by Portuguese missionaries, adopting the baptismal name of João I.
- May 8 – A solar eclipse observed in Metz.
- May – The Ottoman–Mamluk War (1485–1491) between the Ottoman Empire and the Egyptian Mamluks ends.
- June 27 – Louis of Orléans is released by Charles VIII of France after three years of imprisonment.

==== July–September ====
- July 6 – King João I of Kongo, who had recently converted to Christianity, completes the construction of the first Christian church in sub-Saharan Africa, the Cathedral of the Holy Saviour of Congo (Kulumbimbi), in what is now the city of M'banza-Kongo in Angola.
- July 8 – In what is now Tibet in the People's Republic of China, Tsokye Dorje becomes the new ruler of the Buddhist Kingdom of Ü-Tsang upon the death of King Ngagi Wangpo.
- July 13 – Prince Alfonso, the only legitimate son of King João II of Portugal, and heir apparent to the throne, is killed in an accident when the horse he is riding falls and crushes him.
- August 12 – King Henry VII of England summons the members of the English House of Lords and House of Commons to assemble on October 17 at Westminster.
- August 15 – The first Feria de Agosto takes place in the Spanish city of Málaga in celebration of the 1487 conquest of the Granadan city by the Kingdom of Castile. The festival is still celebrated in Spain more than 500 years later.
- September 15 – King Charles VIII of France and the Duchess Anne of Brittany conclude a treaty at Rennes, leading to the breaking of Anne's engagement to Archduke Maximilian of Austria, and an agreement for the marriage of Anne to Charles.
- September – At the battle of Vrpile Gulch in southern Croatia, the armies of the Ottoman Empire are defeated by those of the Kingdom of Croatia.

==== October–December ====
- October 17 – The English Parliament assembles at Westminster, and Richard Empson is elected as Speaker of the House of Commons.
- October 27 – King Charles VIII of France convenes the Estates of Brittany in Vannes, to counsel Anne of Brittany of France's conditions for keeping her as Duchess, including the occupation of the Duchy of Brittany by the French army, the appointment of the Viscount Jean de Rohan to be appointed as governor-general of Brittany on behalf of the King of France, the renunciation of Anne's proxy marriage to the Archduke Maximilian of Austria, and the future marriage of Anne to the French King.
- November 7 – Maximilian I, Holy Roman Emperor and King Vladislaus II of Bohemia and Hungary sign the Peace of Pressburg, formally ending the Austrian–Hungarian War.
- November 15 – To end the siege of Rennes, the remaining portion of the Duchy of Brittany still under control of the Breton royal family, the Duchess Anne signs the Treaty of Rennes and agrees to marry King Charles VIII.
- November 16 – An auto-da-fé held in Brasero de la Dehesa (outside Ávila) concludes the case of the Holy Child of La Guardia, with the execution of several Jewish and converso suspects.
- November 23 – Anne of Brittany annuls her marriage contract with the Archduke Maximilian of Austria and is formally engaged to be married to King Charles VIII of France.
- November 25 – Completing the Reconquista (the "reconquest"), The Granada War is effectively brought to an end (and the Siege of Granada extended for two months) with the signing of the Treaty of Granada between the Catholic Monarchs of Spain and the Moorish Emir of Granada.
- November – The pretender Perkin Warbeck begins a campaign to take the English throne, with a landing in Ireland.
- December 6 – King Charles VIII of France marries the Duchess Anne of Brittany, forcing her to break her marriage contract with Maximilian I, Holy Roman Emperor, and incorporating the Duchy of Brittany into the kingdom of France.
- December 21 – The Truce of Coldstream secures a five-year peace between Scotland and England.
- December 24 – The Black Army of Hungary and its Bohemian Czech allies, commanded by Stephen Zápolya, defeats Duke Jan II Olbracht at the Battle of Presov in what is now Slovakia.

==== Date unknown ====
- In the Ayutthaya Kingdom the reign of Ramathibodi II begins.
- The population of China reaches 56.238 million.
- The Bread and Cheese Revolt breaks out in West Frisia, North Holland, caused by a famine among the peasants due to bad weather conditions.
- A major fire breaks out in Dresden.
- In the Russian territory of Komi (the modern-day Komi Republic), annexed by Russia in 1478, copper and silver ores are discovered, and the territory gains importance as a mining and metallurgical center.
- Nicolaus Copernicus enters the University of Kraków

=== 1492 ===
==== January—March ====
- January 2 – Fall of Granada: Muhammad XI, the last Emir of Granada, surrenders his city to the army of the Catholic Monarchs (Ferdinand II of Aragon and Isabella I of Castile) after a lengthy siege, ending the ten-year Granada War and the centuries-long Reconquista, and bringing an end to 780 years of Muslim control in Al-Andalus.
- January 6 – Ferdinand and Isabella enter Granada.
- January 15 – Christopher Columbus meets Ferdinand and Isabella at the Alcázar de los Reyes Cristianos in Córdoba, Andalusia, and persuades them to support his Atlantic voyage intended to find a new route to the East Indies.
- January 16 – Antonio de Nebrija publishes Gramática de la lengua castellana, the first grammar text for the Castilian Spanish language, in Salamanca, which he introduces to the Catholic Monarchs, Isabella I of Castile and Ferdinand II of Aragon, newly restored to power in Andalusia, as "a tool of empire".
- January 23 – The Soncino Bible, which includes the Pentateuch, Song of Songs, Ruth, Lamentations, Ecclesiastes, and Esther is printed.
- February 1 – The Titulus Crucis relic is discovered, during the renovation of Santa Croce in Gerusalemme Church in Rome.
- March 31 – Ferdinand and Isabella sign the Alhambra Decree, expelling all Jews from Spain unless they convert to Roman Catholicism.

==== April—June ====
- April 17 – The Capitulations of Santa Fe are signed between Christopher Columbus and the Crown of Castile, agreeing on arrangements for his forthcoming voyage.
- May 3 – In the Canary Islands, the Spanish conquistador Alonso Fernandez de Lugo finishes the conquest of the island of La Palma by capturing Tanausu, King of the native Guanches.
- May 23 – At the shipbuilding town of Palos de la Frontera in Spain, an April 30 decree of Queen Isabella of Castile and King Ferdinand of Aragon is read aloud to the residents, directing that two ships are to be delivered to Christopher Columbus and people chosen by the Pinzon brothers will be required to travel on the voyage westward "by command of Their Highnesses").
- May 31 – Pope Innocent VIII and members of the College of Cardinals meet at the church of Santa Maria del Popolo in Rome with diplomatic envoys sent by the Ottoman Sultan Bayezid II. The envoys present the Pope a gift, said to be the Holy Lance, from the Sultan, along with the Sultan's proposal, payment of 120,000 crowns of gold and an annual subsidy of 45,000 ducats in return for the continued imprisonment of Cem Sultan, a half-brother of Bayezid and a rival claimant to the throne.
- June 7 – Casimir IV Jagiellon, of the Jagiellon Royal House, dies, ending his reign over Poland and Lithuania.
- June 8 – Elizabeth Woodville, the last living Yorkist queen consort, dies in England.

==== July—September ====
- July 25 – Pope Innocent VIII, leader of the Roman Catholic Church since 1484, dies at the age of 59 from catarrh.
- July 30 – Alexander Jagiellon is crowned as Grand Duke of Lithuania.
- August 2 – The Jews are expelled from Spain on the Tisha B'Av fast day, pursuant to the Alhambra Decree. More than 40,000 and perhaps as many as 200,000 leave. Sultan Bayezid II of the Ottoman Empire, learning of this, dispatches the Ottoman Navy to bring the Jews safely to Ottoman lands, mainly to the cities of Thessaloniki (in modern-day Greece) and İzmir (in modern-day Turkey); others settle in Sarajevo.
- August 3 – The Genoese navigator Christopher Columbus sails with three ships (Niña, Pinta and Santa María) from Palos de la Frontera, in the service of the Crown of Castile, on his first voyage across the Atlantic Ocean, intending to reach Asia.
- August 8 – The papal conclave, the first to be held in the Sistine Chapel, begins balloting with 23 of the 27 members of the College of Cardinals in attendance. With 16 votes needed for the required two-thirds majority, the first ballot is split among three candidates, with Oliviero Carafa receiving 9, Rodrigo Borja 7 and Giuliano della Rovere 5, while two cast a blank vote.
- August 11 – Cardinal Rodrigo Borja is unanimously elected on the fourth ballot of the papal conclave, and takes the name of Pope Alexander VI, 214th pope of the Roman Catholic Church.
- September 6 – Christopher Columbus sails from La Gomera in the Canary Islands, his final port of call before crossing the Atlantic Ocean for the first time.
- September 23 – Jan I Olbracht is crowned as King of Poland, more than three months after the death of his father, King Casimir IV.

==== October—December ====
- October 3 – The English army besieges Boulogne.
- October 7 – The Columbus expedition, having seen no land for 29 days while sailing eastward, and with some of its sailors threatening to mutiny, spots large flocks of birds, confirming that land is ahead. Christopher Columbus orders a change of course to follow the flight direction of the birds.
- October 10 – The day before sighting land for the first time in a month, Columbus quells an attempt at mutiny by sailors who demand that he turn the Niña around to sail back to Spain.
- October 12 – Believing he has reached the East Indies, Christopher Columbus and his expedition of three ships make landfall in the Caribbean and land on the island of Guanahani, now part of the Bahamas. He names the island "San Salvador". Earlier in the day, sailor Rodrigo de Triana on the Pinta had become the first person to spot land. Because of his belief that he is in the East Indies, Columbus refers to the natives as "indios".
- October 28 – Christopher Columbus lands in what is now the Holguín Province of the island of Cuba.
- November 3 – The Peace of Étaples is signed between England and France, ending French support for Perkin Warbeck, the pretender to the English throne. All English-held territory in France (with the exception of Calais) is returned to France.
- November 6 – In what is now the West African nation of Mali, Sonni Baru becomes the new monarch of the Songhai Empire following death of his father, the Emperor Sonni Ali.
- November 7 – The Ensisheim meteorite, a 127 kg (280 lb) meteorite, lands in a wheat field near the village of Ensisheim in Alsace.
- November 10 – The Catholic Monarchs of Spain issue an Ordinance legalizing the return of Sephardi Jews who had been expelled in August and the terms for remaining. In both cases, all need a baptism as Christian converts in the Roman Catholic church.
- December 5 – Christopher Columbus becomes the first European to set foot on the island of Hispaniola in present day northwestern Haiti.
- December 25 – Columbus' ship Santa María runs aground off Cap-Haïtien in present day Haiti, and is abandoned. The local chief, Guacanagaríx, allows 39 men of Columbus' crew to remain on the island after his departure.

==== Unknown dates ====
- Martin Behaim constructs the first surviving globe of Earth, the Erdapfel. As Columbus would only return from his voyage in 1493, this globe does not show the New World yet.
- The first arboretum to be designed and planted is the Arboretum Trsteno, near Dubrovnik in current-day Croatia.
- Russians build the Ivangorod Fortress, on the eastern banks of the Narva River.
- In Ming dynasty China, the commercial transportation of grain to the northern border, in exchange for salt certificates, is monetized.
- Ermysted's Grammar School, Skipton, North Yorkshire, is founded.
- Marsilio Ficino publishes his translation and commentary of Plotinus.
- Stiegl brewery first recorded in Salzburg.

=== 1493 ===
==== January–March ====
- January 15 – Christopher Columbus and his crew begin their voyage back to Europe on their two remaining ships, the caravel La Niña (guided by Columbus) and the Pinta (piloted by Martín Alonso Pinzón), departing from the island of Hispanola and what becomes known as the Bay of Rincón in the Dominican Republic. The decision to return to Spain comes two days after the crew's battle with the indigenous residents, the Ciguayos.
- January 19 – In the Treaty of Barcelona, King Charles VIII of France returns Cerdagne and Roussillon to King Ferdinand of Aragon.
- February 14 – A storm east of the Azores threatens to capsize both of the remaining ships, the Niña and the Pinta, on the expedition of Christopher Columbus as the crew are returning to Europe after being the first to reach the "New World". The two ships are separated and neither crew knows the fate of the other. The crew takes a vow for one of them to make a pilgrimage if they survive the storm. Columbus himself later makes a pilgrimage to the cathedral at Moguer in Andalusia in Spain.
- February 15 – Columbus begins writing his first account of his voyage to the New World, titled "Letter of Columbus, on the islands of India beyond the Ganges recently discovered", an account later printed and sold throughout Europe. His reference to the Ganges river in India confirms that he thought he had reached Asia.
- March 1 – Martín Alonso Pinzón returns in the Pinta to the city of Bayona in Spain from Christopher Columbus's voyage of discovery, sending the first notice about the discovery to the Catholic Monarchs. Columbus himself is delayed by a storm in the Azores.
- March 4 – Christopher Columbus anchors in Lisbon and completes his February 15 letter on the first voyage, conveying the news of his discoveries.
- March 15 – Christopher Columbus and Martín Alonso Pinzón return to Palos de la Frontera, the original port in Spain from where they started the first voyage of discovery.
- March 30 – In light of his success, Christopher Columbus is granted the title of "Admiral of the Ocean Sea" ("Almirante del mar Océano") and "Viceroy and Governor of the islands which he has discovered in the Indies".

==== April–June ====
- April 12 – Battle of Anfao: Askia Mohammad I defeats Sonni Baru in what becomes the African nation of Mali, and usurps the throne of the Songhai Empire.
- May 4 – In the papal bull Inter caetera, Pope Alexander VI decrees that all lands discovered 100 leagues (or further west) of the Azores are Spanish.
- May 23 – The Treaty of Senlis is signed in France at the city of Senlis (in the modern Oise département) between King Charles VIII of France and Maximilian I, King of the Romans, ending the War of the Burgundian Succession between France and the Holy Roman Empire and dividing the Burgundian lands.
- June 8 – In the most well-documented surgical procedures in the 15th century, the left leg of the Holy Roman Emperor Frederick III is amputated. The surgery is performed at the Linz castle under the direction of the surgeon Hans Seyff.
- June 25 – Friar Bernardo Buil, a Catalan monk in Spain, is appointed by Pope Alexander VI as the first Christian "Vicar Apostolic of the New World". Friar Buil will depart from Cadiz on September 25 on the second voyage of Christopher Columbus, and will begin his mission at La Isabela, a Spanish settlement on the island of Hispanola in what becomes the Dominican Republic.

==== July–September ====
- July 12 – The Nuremberg Chronicle, written in Latin by Hartmann Schedel as Liber Chronicarum and described as "a history of the world from the Creation to the year 1493", with woodcut illustrations by Michael Wohlgemut and Wilhelm Pleydenwurff, is first printed. The expense is undertaken by two German merchants in Nuremberg, Sebald Schreyer and Sebastian Kammermeister.
- July – In India, at Srinagar, Muhammad Shah Mir resumes his rule as the Sultan of Kashmir, replacing Fateh Shah Miri, who had ruled since 1486.
- August 19 – Maximilian I succeeds his father, Frederick III, as Holy Roman Emperor.
- September 9 – At the Battle of Krbava Field in southern Croatia, forces of the Ottoman Empire defeat those of the Kingdom of Croatia.
- September 24 – Christopher Columbus leaves Cádiz on his second voyage of exploration.
- September 26 – Pope Alexander VI issues the bull Dudum siquidem to the Catholic Monarchs, extending the grant of newly discovered lands he made them in Inter caetera.

==== October–December ====
- October 24 – Spain's Royal Council issues a Provision setting harsh sanctions against Spanish Christians who slander people who have newly converted from Judaism to Christianity, particularly with the term tornadizos.
- November 19 – Christopher Columbus lands on the coast of the island of Borinquen, which he renames San Juan (modern-day Puerto Rico).
- December 8 – The first Roman Catholic Mass in the New World is celebrated, with Friar Juan Pérez of the Order of Friars Minor conducting the services at Point Concepcion on the island of Hispaniola.

==== Date unknown ====
- England imposes sanctions on Burgundy for supporting Perkin Warbeck, the pretender to the English throne.
- James IV of Scotland seizes lands of John MacDonald II, putting an end to the Lord of the Isles.
- Huayna Capac becomes emperor of the Inca Empire.
- Leonardo da Vinci creates the first known design for a helicopter.

=== 1494 ===
==== January–March ====
- January 4 – The Cetinje Octoechos (Цетињски октоих, an Eastern Orthodox octoechos (liturgy), first tone), the first incunabulum written in the Serbian recension of Church Slavonic, and the first book printed in Cyrillic in Southeast Europe, is completed in Cetinje.
- January 25 – Alfonso II becomes King of Naples.
- February 5 – The war between the Grand Duchy of Moscow and the Grand Duchy of Lithuania ends after almost seven years, with the Tsar Ivan III signing a "treaty of Eternal Peace" with Lithuania's Grand Duke Alexander Jagiellon. Lithuania is guaranteed its independence in return for ceding its territories captured by Moscow.
- March 16 – Maximilian, King of the Romans, marries Bianca Maria Sforza, sister of the Duke of Milan after the annulment of his marriage to Anne, Duchess of Brittany.
- March 24 – An earthquake estimated centuries later at 5.5 magnitude, strikes the Chinese city of Qujing, destroying 200 homes.

==== April–June ====
- April 30 – On his second voyage to the New World, Columbus and his crew become the first Europeans to sail into what is now Guantanamo Bay in Cuba.
- May 5 – Christopher Columbus first sights Jamaica.
- May 7 – The infant Amda Seyon II succeeds his father Eskender as Emperor of Ethiopia.
- May 31 – First Battle of Acentejo: Natives of the island of Tenerife, known as Guanches, defeat the invading Spanish forces.
- May – Maximilian I, Holy Roman Emperor, recognises the pretender Perkin Warbeck as rightful King of England.
- June 7 – Treaty of Tordesillas: Spain and Portugal divide the New World between themselves.

==== July–September ====
- July 2 –
  - In a battle fought at the village of Igris (now part of western Romania) in territory claimed by Hungary and the Ottoman state of Wallachia, the Hungarian General Pál Kinizsi defeats Turkish armies led by the Ottoman governor Basarab II of Wallachia."Istorie". Primăria comunei Sânpetru Mare.
  - Spain ratifies the Treaty of Tordesillas to divide the lands discovered outside of Europe between Spain (the Kingdoms of Castile and Aragon) and Portugal, essentially granting Spain almost all of the lands in the Americas and Portugal all of the lands in Africa.
- July 29 – Jan V Zatorski, ruler of the Duchy of Zator, sells the Duchy to King Jan I Olbracht of Poland for 80,000 florins, on condition that he retains his title and the right to continue to live in his castle for the rest of his life.
- August 29 – King Charles VIII of France departs from Grenoble with 30,000 troops and 10,000 naval crew on his way toward Italy, in order to assert his claim to become King of Naples (a post occupied by King Alfonso II and to go to war.
- September 5 – The Kingdom of Portugal ratifies its agreement with Spain, the Treaty of Tordesillas, conceding that Spain has jurisdiction of most of the New World, with the exception of what will eventually become the Portuguese colony of Brazil, initially a longitude of 42°30' W.
- September 8 – The three day Battle of Rapallo, fought as part of the Italian War of 1494–1495 between the Kingdom of France and the Kingdom of Naples, is won by the French naval fleet, which then captures and loots Rapallo, near Genoa, after the Neapolitans flee.
- September 11 – King Charles VIII of France and Ludovico Sforza, regent for the Duke of Milan, meet in Asti and conclude an alliance against King Alfonso II of Naples.
- September 24 – The earliest hurricane to be specifically recorded by historians, strikes the island of Hispaniola near the Spanish colonial capital, La Isabela, the day after Christopher Columbus arrives at Saona, following five months of explorations.

==== October–December ====
- October 13 – The British administrator assigned to Ireland, Sir Edward Poynings, arrives at Ireland with about 1,000 men and lands at Howth.
- October 21 – France and Milan, with at least 14,000 troops, capture the town of Mordano, part of the Lordship of Imola, an ally of Naples. The French then begin killing at least 300 of the Mordano defenders and pillaging the town, while the Kingdom of Naples refuses to come to Mordano's defense.
- October 22 – Ludovico Sforza becomes Duke of Milan upon the death of his nephew, the Duke Gian Galeazzo Sforza, and invites Charles VIII of France to invade Italy in support of his claim, beginning the First Italian War in the Italian Wars.
- October 26 – Amda Seyon II is deposed and killed, and his uncle Na'od succeeds him as Emperor of Ethiopia.
- November 8 – Facing little opposition in his march across Italy, King Charles VIII of France captures Pisa.
- November 9 – The Medici Bank becomes insolvent and the House of Medici is expelled from Florence.
- November 10 – Fra Luca Pacioli's Summa de arithmetica, geometria, proportioni et proportionalità is published in Venice, containing the first printed account of algebra in the vernacular, and the first published description of the double-entry accounting system.
- November 17 – Italian War of 1494–98: The armies of King Charles VIII of France enter Florence. Charles is dissuaded from destroying the city by the Florentine leader, Girolamo Savonarola, who had recently taken control from the Medici family. After being persuaded that he has a divine role of reformation of the Roman Catholic Church, King Charles spares Florence from destruction and leaves the city on November 28, guiding his troops onward toward Rome.
- December 1 – The Irish Parliament opens at Drogheda on the first Monday after Saint Andrew's Day as summoned by Sir Edward Poynings, to pass the two "Poynings' Laws" restricting Irish self-government. The more drastic of the two laws provides that laws already enacted in England apply to Ireland as well, while the other law directs that the Irish Parliament cannot be summoned without prior approval by the King of England.
- December 25 – Second Battle of Acentejo: The Spanish crush the native forces of the island of Tenerife, leading to the subjugation of this last bastion of resistance in the Canary Islands.
- December 31 – King Charles VIII of France and the French Army peacefully march into Rome after being granted free passage by Pope Alexander VI.

==== Date unknown ====
- Aztec forces conquer and sack Mitla.
- Johann Reuchlin publishes De verbo mirifico.
- Charles VIII of France purchases the right to the Byzantine Empire from exiled pretender, Andreas Palaiologos.

=== 1495 ===
==== January–March ====
- January 20 – At Hanseong (now Seoul,Prince Yi Yung becomes the new ruler of Joseon, comprising most of the Korean peninsula, now North Korea and South Korea. Taking the regnal name Yeongsangun, he succeeds his father, King Seongjong, who had ruled more than 25 years. Known for his cruelty, Yeonsangun will be overthrown after more than 11 years in 1506 and exiled to Ganghwa Island.
- January 23 – King Alfonso II of Naples abdicates after almost a year on the throne as the army of King Charles VIII of France approaches the Neapolitan border. Alfonso's son becomes the new monarch as King Ferdinand II.
- January 28 – Prince Cem Sultan, brother of the Ottoman Sultan Bayezid II, imprisoned since 1482 after being captured by the Knights Hospitaller, and held captive in Rome since 1489, is released from to French custody by Pope Alexander VI at the request of King Charles of France.
- February 22 – Italian War of 1494–98: King Charles VIII of France enters the city of Naples, to claim the throne of the Kingdom of Naples. A few months later, he decides to return to France, and leaves Naples with most of his army, leaving a force under his cousin Gilbert, Count of Montpensier as viceroy. Syphilis is first definitely recorded in Europe during this invasion. (perhaps from French forces who may have contacted Croats fleeing an Ottoman army in the east).
- February 10 – King's College, Aberdeen, predecessor of the University of Aberdeen in Scotland, is founded with the issuance of the papal bull Primo Erectio Universitatis by Pope Alexander VI on the petition of William Elphinstone, Bishop of Aberdeen.

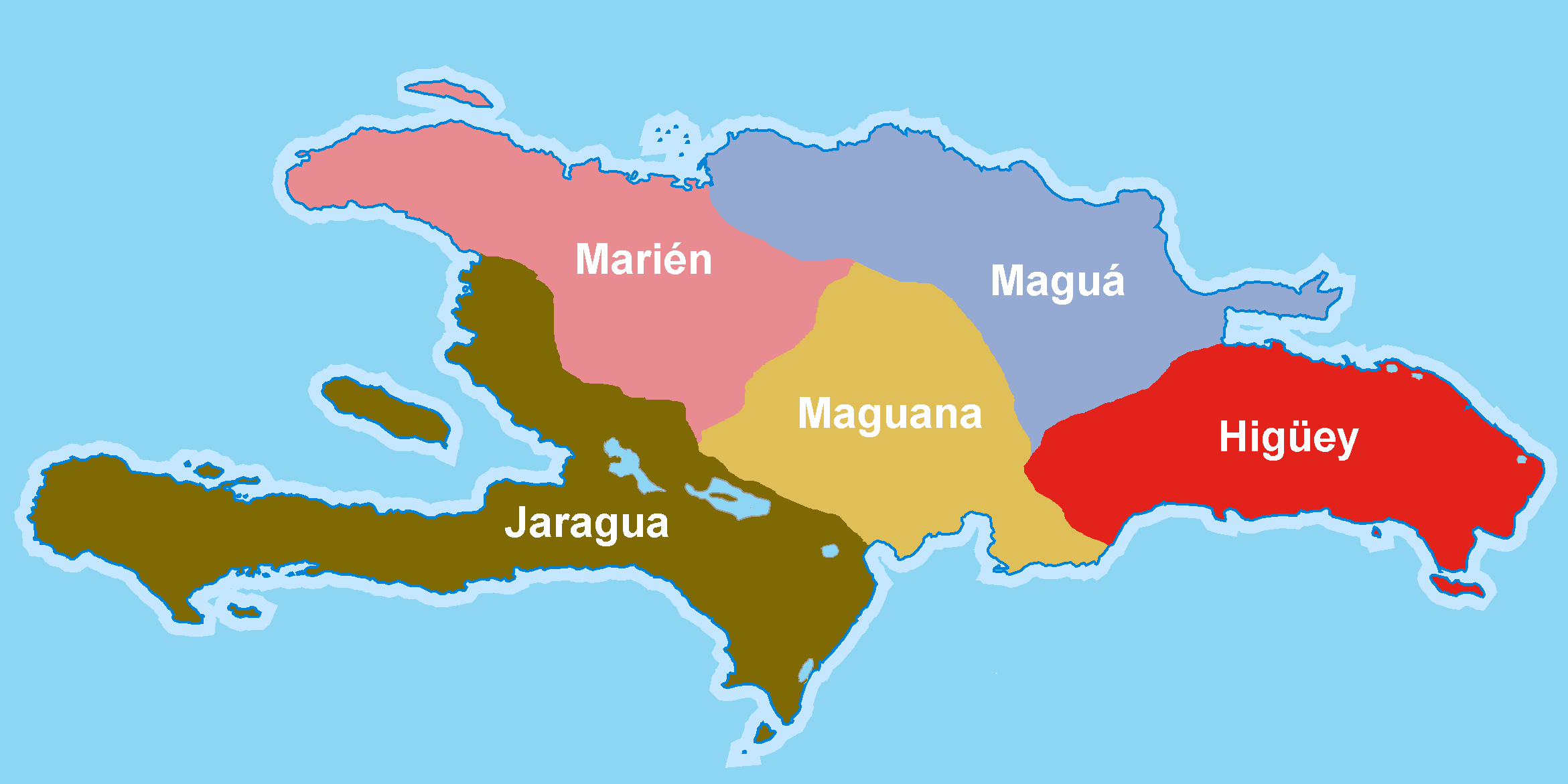
The five caciques of the Taino rulers of Hispaniola

- March 24 – The first military combat between the Old World and the New World takes place at the Battle of Vega Real. In his role as the Spanish Governor of Hispaniola, Christopher Columbus and his ally, the Taino Chief (cacique) Guacanagaríx of Marién and begin a war of retaliation against the cacique Caonabo of Maguana, who had led the 1493 massacre of the Spanish colonists at La Navidad.
- March 26 – The inaugural session of the Diet of Worms (Wormser Reichstag), a gathering of the electors and princes of the Holy Roman Empire to discuss reforms of the government, is opened at Worms, Germany, by Maximilian I, the acting Holy Roman Emperor.
- March 31 – In response to the French invasion and rapid subjugation of the Italian nations, the League of Venice is formed by representatives of Pope Alexander, King Ferdinand of Spain, the acting Holy Emperor Maximilian, and Ludovico, Duke of Milan.

==== April–June ====
- April 2 – (10th waxing of Vaishakha 857 ME The two-day coronation of King Binnya Ran II as ruler of the Hanthawaddy kingdom, in what is now southern Myanmar, begins at the Shwemawdaw Pagoda at the capital, Pegu (now Bago in Myanmar). Binnya Ran had succeeded to the throne in 1492 upon the death of his father, King Dhammazedi.
- May 2 – At the Battle of Rapallo, 11 ships of the Republic of Genoa Navy commanded by Francesco Spinola and Fabrizio Giustiniani, defeat a French 11-ship force led by Louis de Miolans, who is taken prisoner of war when he and his ships are all captured. Rapallo, captured by the French a year earlier, is retaken by Genoa and 300 women held hostage by the French are freed.
- May 26 – A Spanish army under Gonzalo Fernández de Córdoba lands in Calabria, with the purpose of ousting the French and restoring Ferdinand II of Naples to the throne.
- June 1 – Brother John Cor of Lindores Abbey pays duty on 8 bolls of malt to the Exchequer in Scotland to make aqua vitae for King James IV; the record in the Exchequer Rolls is the first written reference to Scotch whisky.
- June 11 – Louis, Duke of Orleans, at the time a French general, opens a new front in the Italian War as he and his troops are allowed to occupy the city of Novara in the Duchy of Milan.
- June 28 – Battle of Seminara: The deposed King Ferdinand II of Naples and the reigning Spanish King Ferdinand II of Aragon, with forces commanded by Gonzalo Fernandez, are defeated by a French army commanded by Bernard Stewart, Lord of Aubigny.
- June – Gribshunden, the flagship of King Hans Oldenburg of Denmark sinks off the coast of Ronneby in Sweden while King Hans is ashore to negotiate with Sten Sture the Elder to restore the power of the Kalmar Union. According to some accounts, the sinking (and the death of more than 150 crew) happened after an explosion and fire, though explorations of the shipwreck centuries later show no indication of burning.

==== July–September ====
- July 3 – At the Battle of Deal, Perkin Warbeck's troops land in Kent, in support of his claim to the English crown, backed by Margaret of York, Duchess of Burgundy. They are routed before Warbeck himself can disembark, and he retreats to Ireland and then to Scotland.
- July 6 – Winning the Battle of Fornovo, the French army under King Charles secures its retreat from Italy, by defeating a combined Milanese-Venetian force of the League of Venice, commanded by Francesco Gonzaga, Marquis of Mantua.
- July 7 – With Charles VIII forced to retreat from Naples, Ferdinand II returns to the throne as the Neapolitan King.
- July 19 – The League of Venice (with troops from Venice, Milan and Mantua) begins the two-month Siege of Novara in the Duchy of Milan to drive out the French occupiers led by the Duke of Orleans.
- July 23 – After failing at the Battle of Deal, Perkin Warbeck and his troops land with 11 ships at the Ireland port of Waterford to gain a foothold in his attempt to invade England. Warbeck is joined by an Irish noble, Maurice FitzGerald, Earl of Desmond, and begins an 11-day siege. The defenders of Waterford protect the walled city by damming the St. John's River to flood the marshes around Warbeck's soldiers, and fire the fortresses cannons at Warbeck's ships.
- August 3 – After the sinking of two of his ships, Perkin Warbeck ends this siege of Waterford and retreats from Ireland along with his remaining fleet and warriors.
- August 7 – The Diet of Worms is adjourned in the Holy Roman Empire after more than four months, with an agreement among the constituent states to enact the Ewiger Landfriede (Eternal Peace), outlawing feuds between the states and the Holy Roman Empire's family groups, and to resolve controversies in a new Imperial Court (Reichskammergericht) and the Aulic Council.
- September 15 – King Henry VII of England summons the English Parliament for the first time in more than three years, directing the members of the House of Commons and the House of Lords to assemble at Westminster on October 14.
- September 24 – The League of Venice, with troops commanded by Beatrice d'Este, Duchess of Milan and Ludovico Sforza, Duke of Milan, succeeeds after more than three months in liberating the Milanese city of Novara from French control, and forces Louis of Orleans to flee.

==== October–December ====
- October 24 – The fifth parliament of England's King Henry VII opens at Westminster.
- October 25 – King Manuel, Duke of Beja and Visieu takes the throne of Portugal as King Manuel I, following the death of his cousin, King João II.
- November 30 – An explosion at Vyborg Castle deters the Russian forces, who have invaded Sweden through Karelia.
- December 22 – At the close of the 1495 Parliament, King Henry VII of England gives royal assent to numerous new laws, including the Treason Act 1495 (An Acte that noe person going with the Kinge to the Warres shalbe attaynt of treason); the Vagabonds and Beggars Act 1495 ("Vagabonds, idle and suspected persons shall be set in the stocks for three days and three nights and have none other sustenance but bread and water and then shall be put out of Town."); and the Suing in Forma Pauperis Act 1495 (allowing "such persons as are poor" to file suit without having to pay court costs).

==== Date unknown ====
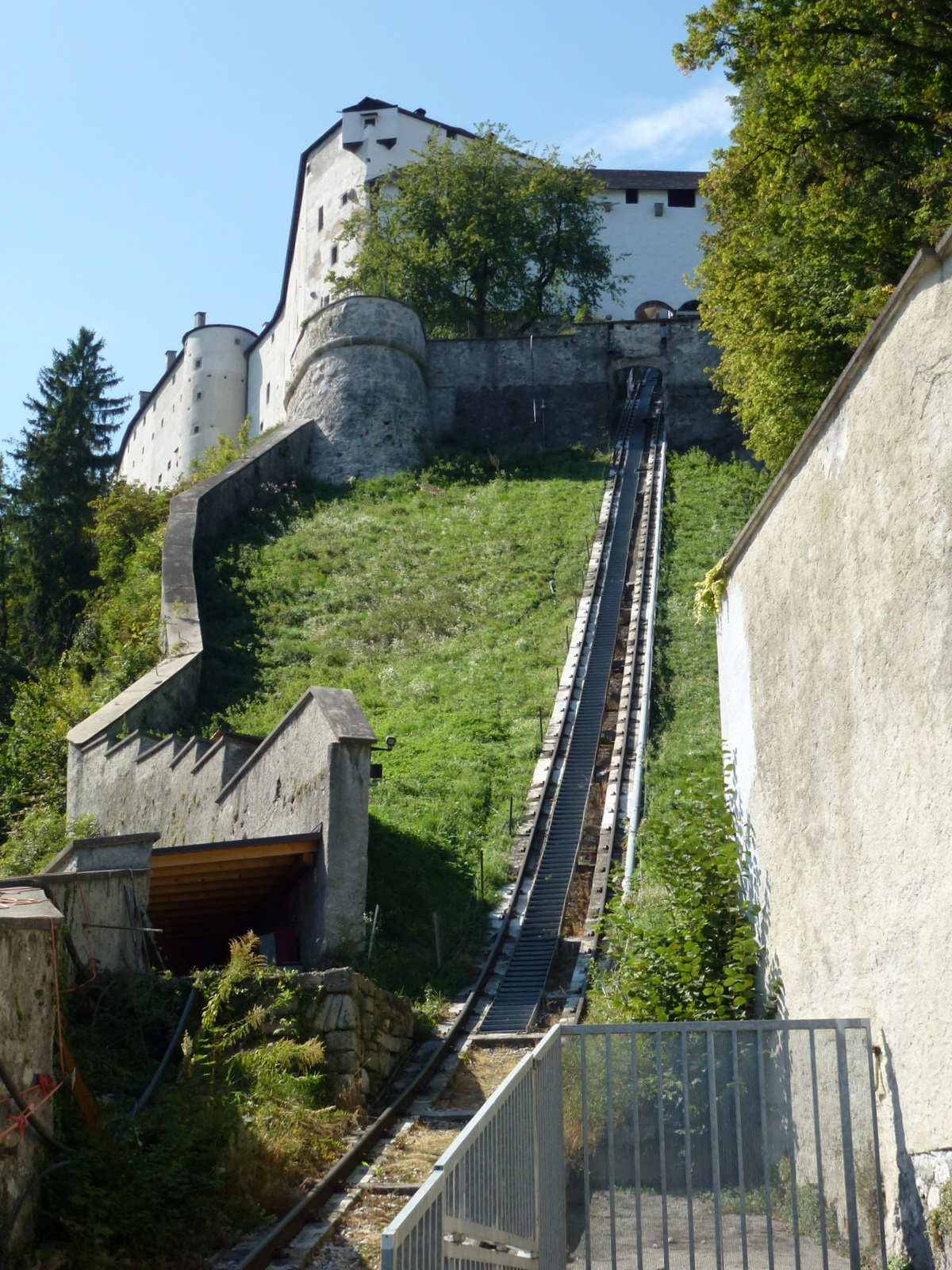
Reisszug, as it appeared in 2011

- The oldest extant cable railway, the Reisszug, is created by order of the Archbishop Leonhard von Keutschach shortly after his election on July 7, 1495. The railway is used for the manual pulling of a wheeled cart up an incline, to provide goods for the Hohensalzburg Fortress, at Salzburg in Austria.
- Poynings' Law comes into effect, placing the Parliament of Ireland under the authority of the Parliament of England.
- The Reichskammergericht of the Holy Roman Empire is founded in Frankfurt.
- Henry VII of England commissions the world's first dry dock, at Portsmouth.
- Piero Pacini da Pescia publishes Epistles, Gospels, and Popular Readings in the Tuscan Language

=== 1496 ===
==== January–March ====
- January 1 – In Venice, historian Marino Sanuto begins the first volume of I Diarii, a diary of the events in his own life and, more importantly, a daily record of events in the Republic of Venice and those reported to him by Venetian representatives in other parts of Europe. What is now described as "probably the largest, most comprehensive, and valuable ever written by one man" ,he continues his daily work for more than 37 years, ending in June 30, 1533.
- February 24 – King Henry VII of England signs the commercial treaty Intercursus Magnus with Venice, Florence, and the cities of the Hanseatic League and the Netherlands.
- February – Pietro Bembo's Petri Bembi de Aetna Angelum Chalabrilem liber, a description of a journey to Mount Etna, is published in Venice by Aldus Manutius, the first book printed in the old-style serif or humanist typeface cut by Francesco Griffo (known from the 20th century as Bembo) and with early adoption of the semicolon (dated 1495 according to the more veneto).
- March 5 – Henry VII of England issues letters patent to Italian-born adventurer John Cabot and his sons, authorizing them to discover unknown lands.
- March 10 – Christopher Columbus leaves Hispaniola for Spain, ending his second visit to the Western Hemisphere. During his time here he has forcibly subjugated the island, enslaved the Taíno, and laid the basis for a system of land grants tied to the Taíno's enslavement.

==== April–June ====
- April 16 – Filippo II becomes the new ruler of the Duchy of Savoy upon the death of his 6-year-old great-nephew, Duke Carlo II Giovanni Amedeo.
- April 23 – In the Marquisate of Mantua on the Italian peninsula, Francesco II Gonzaga, Marquis of Mantua decrees that all Jews in Mantua are to wear a yellow badge to distinguish themselves from the Christian residents of Mantua. He modifies the ruling three days later to declare that a Jewish woman may wear a yellow veil over her face in place of the badge.
- April 26 – King Jan I Olbracht of Poland issues the Piotrków Privilege as a reward to members of nobility who financially supported his invasion of Moldavia. The Privilege prohibits the enslaved serfs from leaving their owners' land without permission, and bans city dwellers from buying land.
- May 2 – The Marquis of Mantua makes a further adjustment to his April 23 decree on Jewish identification, making further allowances to the dress code of Jewish women,and excusing the requirement of wearing a veil to cover the face. Unmarried women must still wear yellow headgear and drape a veil over their shoulders; married women are excused from covering their faces with veils but must wear headgear; and widows may wear their color of choice for headgear.
- May 14 – At Augsburg, Maximilian, King of the Romans, grants an audience to Sir Christopher Urswick, the Kingdom of England's ambassador to the Empire, and informs his advisers that he believes the Ambassador is a spy gathering intelligence on the Empire's intentions toward England. Zacharia Contarini, the Empire's ambassador to France, then sends the report to the Doge of the Republic of Venice, Agostino Barbarigo.
- June 12 – Jesus College, Cambridge, is founded.

==== July–September ====
- July 5 – In the Canary Islands, the native kings of Tenerife surrender to the Spanish conquistador Alonso Fernández de Lugo.
- July 21 – Spanish forces under Gonzalo Fernández de Córdoba capture Atella after a siege. Among the prisoners is the French viceroy of Naples, the Comte de Montpensier. King Ferdinand II of Naples is restored to his throne.
- August 5 – Bartholomew Columbus, brother of Christopher Columbus, formally founds the city of Santo Domingo (first settled in March) on Hispaniola (in the modern-day Dominican Republic), making it the oldest permanent European settlement in the New World.
- September 7– Federico of Aragon becomes the King of Naples upon the death of his nephew, King Ferdinando II.
- September 21– King James IV of Scotland and his army invade Northumberland in the Kingdom of England, in support of the pretender to the English throne, Perkin Warbeck. The invaders leave on September 25 and travel back to Scotland.

==== October–December ====
- October 20 – Joanna of Castile, second daughter of Ferdinand II of Aragon and Isabella I of Castile, heiress to Castile, marries the archduke Philip, heir through his mother to the Burgundian Netherlands, and through his father to the Holy Roman Empire.
- November 20 – King Henry VII of England summons the English Parliament to assemble starting on January 16.
- November 27 – Led by Prince Prataparudra Deva, son of the Emperor Purushottama Deva, the Gajapati Empire (now India's state of Odisha) invades the Vijayanagara Empire (now the Karnataka state) and its armies advance as far as the Penna River, where they are stopped by a force commanded by the Vijayanagara sultan Tuluva Narasa Nayaka, and are turned back.
- December 5 – King Manuel I of Portugal issues a decree ordering the expulsion of "heretics" from the country.

=== 1497 ===
==== January–March ====
- January 16 – At Westminster, King Henry VII opens his sixth English Parliament for a two-month session. The House of Commons elects Sir Thomas Englefield as its speaker.
- February 7 – At the public square in Florence, on Shrove Tuesday, followers of the charismatic Dominican friar and evangelist Girolamo Savonarola carry out the first "bonfire of the vanities" and burn thousands of artworks, books, clothing, mirrors, music instruments, playing cards and other objects deemed by them to be a temptation to sin.
- March 13 –
  - King Henry VII of England gives royal assent to numerous acts passed as parliament adjourns, including the Weights and Measures Act 1496, standardizing units of weight and of volume throughout England. Specifically, the smallest unit, the "sterling" is set at the weight of 32 corns of wheat, 20 sterlings are an ounce, 12 ounces are a pound. A gallon of wheat must weight 8 pounds Troy Weight, and a 12-gallon bushel must weight 64 pounds.
  - King Henry also assents to the Benefit of Clergy Act 1496, requiring that charges against a church official for treason must be tried in a government court of law. For other charges, clergymen may still have the benefit of being tried by an ecclesiastical court under canon law.
- March 3 – The Russo-Swedish War (1495–1497) ends with a six year truce signed in Russia at Novgorod. Stockholm Due to gathering unrest at home, the Swedish leader Sten Sture the Elder is forced to offer a peace to Ivan III of Moscow.

==== April–June ====
- April 18 – Captain Andrea Loredan of the Republic of Venice departs southward on the Adriatic Sea on a large, heavily-armed warship with a crew of 450, with a mission of locating the Spanish Navarrese pirate Pedro Navarro.
- May 10 – Amerigo Vespucci allegedly leaves Cádiz, for his first voyage to the New World. The account of a voyage (from May 10, 1497 to October 15, 1498) is doubted because the only mention of the voyage is in a letter written six years later, and the course described would have traveled across the land of Mexico and into the Pacific Ocean.
- May 12 – Pope Alexander VI excommunicates Girolamo Savonarola.
- May 20 – John Cabot sets sail from Bristol, on the ship Matthew (principally owned by Richard Amerike), looking for new lands to the west (some sources give a May 2 date).
- May – The Cornish Rebellion breaks out in England, incited by war taxes.
- June 13 – Ferdinand and Isabella, the Catholic Monarchs of Spain, issue the ordinance of Medina del Campo, creating a money system based on the copper maravedí, creating the peso of 34 maravedis. In the next three centuries, this system will dominate international payments. It will be used in almost all parts of the Americas and large parts of Asia. It is the basis for a number of modern currencies, including the U.S. dollar.
- June 17 – Battle of Deptford Bridge near London: Cornish rebels under Michael An Gof are soundly defeated by Henry VII.
- June 24 – John Cabot lands in North America (near present day Bonavista, Newfoundland).
- June 26 – The coronation of Federico di Trastamara, son of King Alfonso II, as King of Naples takes place at the Cathedral of Barletta.
- June 27 – At what is supposed to be a meeting at Nysa in about a united front by the nobility of Poland against the Ottoman Empire, Mikołaj II Niemodlińsk, the Duke of Opole in Poland as well as ruler of the duchies of Niemodlin, Brzeg, and Strzelce, attempts stab two of the other nobles attending, Casimir II, Duke of Cieszyn and the Bishop Jan IV Roth. Mikolaj II is beheaded the next day.

==== July–September ====
- July 8 – Vasco da Gama's fleet departs from Lisbon, beginning his expedition to India.
- September 7 – Second Cornish Uprising in England: Perkin Warbeck lands near Land's End; on September 10 he is proclaimed as King in Bodmin.
- September 28 – At the Battle of Rotebro, John, King of Denmark, defeats Sten Sture the Elder.
- September 30 – The Treaty of Ayton establishes a seven-year peace between England and Scotland.

==== October–December ====
- October 4 – Leaders of the Second Cornish Uprising surrender to the King at Taunton; the following day, Warbeck, having deserted his army, is captured at Beaulieu Abbey in Hampshire.
- October 6 –
  - Sten Sture the Elder agrees to recognize Hans, King of Denmark and of Norway as the rightful King of Sweden and ends his 27-year term as the Swedish Regent.
- October 18 – The nobles of Sweden's estates formally elect King Hans of Denmark and Norway as King of Sweden, restoring the power of the Kalmar Union.
- November 7 –
  - Portuguese explorer Vasco da Gama and his crew become the first Europeans to set foot on South African soil as the ship São Gabriel arrives at St Helena Bay and makes landfall.
  - Filiberto II becomes the new Duke of Savoy upon the death of his father, Filippo II, who had reigned for only 19 months.
- November 22 – The Vasco da Gama expedition discovers the first sea route from Europe to India as he and his crew, on four ships, round the Cape of Good Hope.
- November 26 – The coronation of Hans of Denmark as King of Sweden takes place at Stockholm, as he adopts the regnal name of King Johann II of Sweden.
- December 5 – King Manuel I of Portugal proclaims an edict in which he demands that Jews convert to Christianity or leave the country.
- December 16 – the Vasco da Gama expedition travels past the Great Fish River on South Africa's Eastern Cape and sails into previously unexplored waters in the Indian Ocean.
- December 23 – Sheen Palace is destroyed by fire. Henry VII of England rebuilds it as Richmond Palace.

==== Date unknown ====
- Ivan the Great issues his law code, the Sudebnik.
- The Ottomans give Russian merchants freedom of trade within the empire.
- Iamblichus De mysteriis Aegyptorum edited by Marsilio Ficino is published.
- The Annals of the Four Masters refer to a famine in Ireland which "prevailed through all Ireland".

=== 1498 ===
==== January–March ====
- January 28 – In a letter to the Archbishop of Canterbury, who is also the Chancellor of the English treasury, King Henry VII of England formally authorizes, from his own funds, declares that "we, for certain considerations us especially moving, have given and granted unto our well-beloved John Calbot of the parts of Venice an annuity or annual rent of £20 sterling, to be had and yearly perceived from the Feast of the Annunciation of our Lady last past, during our pleasure, of our customs and subsidies growing in our port of Bristol by the hands of our customs there for the time being, at Michaelmas and Easter, by even portions.
- February 3 – King Henry grants John Cabot a royal patent for a second westward sea voyage toward North America, with hopes that Cabot will discover a seaward route to Asia. The patent declares that "By thiesee presentes geve and graunte to our well beloved John Kaboto, Venecian, sufficient auctorite and power that he may take at his pleasure vi englisshe shippes and theym convey and lede to the londe and Iles of late founde y the seid John in our name." The expedition launches in early May, but with fewer ships than promised.
- February 9 – Leonardo da Vinci completes his painting The Last Supper, on the refectory wall of Milan's Santa Maria delle Grazie Convent. Because the location is a thin exterior wall, the effects of humidity and moisture-retaining rock behind the wall begin to cause the painting to deteriorate.
- March 2 – Vasco da Gama visits Quelimane and Mozambique, in southeastern Africa.
- March 21 – In Friesland, in the Netherlands, during the ongoing civil war between the Vetkopers and Schieringers, the Schieringers seek out the help of Albrecht III, Duke of Saxony at the cost of losing Frisian independence.

==== April–June ====
- April 7 – Louis XII becomes the new King of France upon the death of his wife's brother, King Charles VIII. King Charles had struck his head on the top of a door frame while on his way to watch a tennis match at Amboise.
- April 14 – Portuguese explorer Vasco da Gama reaches Malindi, in modern-day Kenya.
- May 17 – Portuguese navigator Vasco da Gama arrives at Calicut (modern-day Kozhikode), India, becoming the first European to get there by sailing around Africa, thus discovering the maritime route to India. He finds a local Arab merchant who is able to interpret for him.
- May 21 – In England, the members of the Company of Merchant Adventurers of London are granted a trade monopoly with the Netherlands by King Henry VII "in return for the payment of £5,000" to the royal coffers.
- May 23 – Girolamo Savonarola, ruler of Florence, is executed for criticizing the Pope.
- May 30 – Christopher Columbus sets out on his third voyage to the Western Hemisphere from Sanlúcar, Spain.
- May 27 – The formal coronation of King Louis XII in France takes place at the Reims Cathedral.
- May – In "early May", the John Cabot expedition departs from Bristol on a second expedition westward to find a sea route between England and Japan.
- June 10 – The Battle of Laaksum is fought in Friesland in the Netherlands at Stavoren and Warns, bringing an end to the civil war fought for almost a century between the Vetkopers and Schieringers. The Scheringers are triumphant after agreeing to allow Albert III, Duke of Saxony to annex Friesland in return for Albert's protection.
- June 20 – Niccolò Machiavelli, who will later be the author of the influential political theory guide The Prince, is elected by the Great Council of Florence as the Secretary of the Second Chancellery of the Republic of Florence.
- June 30 – The Wiener Hofmusikkapelle, a forerunner of the Vienna Boys' Choir, is founded by order of Maximilian I, Holy Roman Emperor, instructing officials of the imperial court at Vienna to employ a vocal teacher (singing master), two bass singers and six boys.

==== July–September ====
- July 31 – Columbus becomes the first European to visit the island of Trinidad.
- August 1 – Columbus discovers the mouth of the Orinoco at what is now Venezuela on the continent of South America, but does not enter.
- August 4 – Columbus begins eight days of exploring the Gulf of Paria between Trinidad and Venezuela.
- August 5 – Columbus lands on the Paria Peninsula, in what is now Venezuela in the first definitely recorded landing of Europeans on the mainland Americas.
- August 12 – Columbus concludes his exploration of Venezuela.
- September 20 – (Meiō 7, 2nd day of the 7th month) A massive earthquake, estimated centuries later as having been 8.6 magnitude occurs off of the coast of the Japanese region of Nankaidō at about 8:00 in the morning. The resulting tsunami kills at least 5,000 people (and perhaps as many as 41,000) when it strikes Kamakura and the surrounding area in what is now Japan's Kanagawa Prefecture. The tsunami washes away a building that houses the Kotoku-in Buddhist temple, but spares the large bronze statue of the Buddha Amitābha.

==== October–December ====
- October 28 – In the Chinese Empire, two days after being blamed by the Emperor Zhu Youcheng for bringing misfortunes to the Empire by having built a pavilion in the imperial gardens that disregarded feng shui principles, royal administrator Li Guang commits suicide. The Emperor's daughter Princess Taikang had died suddenly on October 1, and a fire had broken out in one of the palaces in Beijing's Forbidden City on October 26.
- October 31 – An-Nasir Muhammad ibn Qaitbay, Sultan of Egypt and Syria, is assassinated, and is succeeded by his uncle, the Vizier Abu Sa'id Qansuh.
- November 24 – In the Kingdom of the Catholic Monarchs of Spain, Diego de Deza, Bishop of Jaén, is commissioned as the Grand Inquisitor for the Crown of Castile, the Kingdom of León, and for Granada. His power is expanded in September to include the rest of Spain.
- November 26 – Pope Alexander VI orders the demolition of the historic Meta Romuli pyramid in Rome in order to clear the way for the building of the new road to the Tiber Bridge.
- December 17 – Eight months after ascending the throne, King Louis XII of France annuls his marriage to Jeanne de Valois after 22 years so that he can marry Anne, Duchess of Brittany. The King grants his former queen the title of the Duchess of Berry.

==== Date unknown ====
- During the summer, the final Welsh revolt of the medieval era breaks out in Meirionnydd, North Wales; Harlech Castle is captured by the rebels before the revolt is suppressed.
- João Fernandes Lavrador and Pedro de Barcelos journey to Greenland; during their voyage, they discover the land which they name Labrador.
- Gun barrel rifling is invented in Augsburg, Bavaria.

=== 1499 ===
==== January–March ====
- January 8 – Louis XII of France marries Anne of Brittany, in accordance with a law set by his predecessor, Charles VIII.
- February 4 – Hans, King of Denmark is formally crowned as King of Sweden and his wife Christina of Saxony crowned as Queen Consort.
- February 9 – The Treaty of Blois is signed between the Kingdom of France and the Republic of Venice as a secret military alliance between the two nations to attack the Duchy of Milan.
- February 20 – The Battle of Hard is fought near the village of Hard in modern-day western Austria as the Swiss Confederacy defeats the troops of the Holy Roman Empire in the first large-scale confrontation of the Swabian War.
- March 22 – At the Battle of Bruderholz, the Swiss Confederation defeats a larger force of troops from the Swabian League near Basel.

==== April–June ====
- April 11 – The Battle of Schwaderloh is won by the Swiss Confederacy over the Swabian League with more than 1,400 of the Swabian troops killed.
- April 20 – The Swiss Confederacy defeats the forces of the Holy Roman Empire in the Battle of Frastanz, with more than 2,000 Imperial troops killed.
- April 30 – The University of Valencia is founded in Spain with the passage of the University Statutes by the magistrates of Valencia.
- May 19 – Catherine of Aragon, the future first wife of Henry VIII, is married by proxy to his brother, Arthur, Prince of Wales.
- June 1 – Pedro Alonso Niño, who had accompanied Columbus on his first voyage to the New World in 1492, departs from Palos in Spain toward South America on a 7-month voyage to the New World. Niño sets sail in a small caravel with 33 men
- June 10 – Pope Alexander VI informs the Roman Catholic cardinals that the Sultan of the Ottoman Empire has amassed a fleet of 300 ships to lay siege to the city of Rhodes.
- June 15 – The Great Epidemic of plague reaches London, forcing King Henry and Queen Anne to flee to the capital to Langley on June 25 and then to Abingdon.
- June 20 – Queen Isabella of Spain orders Christopher Columbus to liberate and repatriate Indians from the New World, declaring that nobody had authorized him to kidnap any of her subjects.

==== July–September ====
- July 22 – Battle of Dornach: The Swiss decisively defeat the army of Maximilian I, Holy Roman Emperor.
- July 28 – First Battle of Lepanto: The Turkish navy wins a decisive victory over the Venetians.
- August 24 – Lake Maracaibo is discovered, by Alonso de Ojeda and Amerigo Vespucci.
- August – Polydore Vergil completes De inventoribus rerum, the first modern history of inventions.
- September 18 – Vasco da Gama arrives at Lisbon, returning from India, and is received by King Manuel of Portugal.
- September 22 – Treaty of Basel: Maximilian is forced to grant the Swiss de facto independence.

==== October–December ====
- October 26 – King Louis XII of France and his troops seize Milan, driving out Duke Ludovico Sforza, and Leonardo da Vinci flees to Venice.
- October 25 – The Pont Notre-Dame in Paris, constructed under Charles VI of France, collapses into the Seine.
- November 5 – The Catholicon is published in Tréguier (Brittany). This Breton–greek–Latin dictionary had been written in 1464 by Jehan Lagadeuc. It is the first dictionary of either French or Breton.
- November 23 – Perkin Warbeck, pretender to the throne of England, is hanged for reportedly attempting to escape from the Tower of London.
- November 28 – Edward Plantagenet, 17th Earl of Warwick, last male member of the House of York, is executed for reportedly attempting to escape from the Tower of London.
- December 18 – The Rebellion of the Alpujarras (1499–1501) begins in the Kingdom of Granada (Crown of Castile) against the forced conversions of Muslims in Spain.

==== Date unknown ====
- Montenegro, the last free monarchy in the Balkans, is annexed by the Ottoman Empire, as part of the sanjak of Shkodër, and Stefan II Crnojević is removed from office.
- Johannes Trithemius inadvertently reveals interests in magic by writing a letter to a Carmelite friar about a treatise he is writing on steganography.
- Heinrich Cornelius Agrippa matriculates at Cologne University.
- Giggleswick School is founded by Reverend James Carr in England.

== Births ==
1490

- February 14 – Valentin Friedland, German scholar and educator of the Reformation (d. 1556)
- February 17 – Charles III, Duke of Bourbon, French military leader (d. 1527)
- March 6 – Fridolin Sicher, Swiss composer (d. 1546)
- March 22 – Francesco Maria I della Rovere, Duke of Urbino, Italian noble (d. 1538)
- March 24 – Giovanni Salviati, Italian Catholic cardinal (d. 1553)
- April – Vittoria Colonna, Italian poet (d. 1547)
- April 4 – Vojtěch I of Pernstein, Bohemian nobleman (d. 1534)
- May 17 – Albert, Duke of Prussia, last Grand Master of the Teutonic Knights (d. 1568)
- June 28 – Albert of Mainz, German elector and archbishop (d. 1545)
- July 25 – Amalie of the Palatinate, Duchess consort of Pomerania (d. 1524)
- August 5 – Andrey of Staritsa, son of Ivan III "the Great" of Russia (d. 1537)
- September 23 – Johann Heß, German theologian (d. 1547)
- October – Olaus Magnus, Swedish ecclesiastic and writer (d. 1557)
- October 12 – Bernardo Pisano, Italian composer (d. 1548)
- November 10 – John III, Duke of Cleves (d. 1539)
- December 25 – Francesco Marinoni, Italian Roman Catholic priest (d. 1562)
- December 26 – Friedrich Myconius, German Lutheran theologian (d. 1546)
- December 30 – Ebussuud Efendi, Ottoman Grand Mufti (d. 1574)
- approx. date – Properzia de' Rossi, Italian Renaissance sculptor (d. 1530)
- date unknown
  - Archibald Douglas, 6th Earl of Angus, Scottish noble (d. 1556)
  - Luca Ghini, Italian physician and botanist (d. 1566)
  - Bars Bolud Jinong, Mongol Khagan (d. 1531)
  - Argula von Grumbach, German Protestant reformer (d. 1564)
  - Jean Salmon Macrin, French poet (d. 1557)
  - Caspar Schwenckfeld, German theologian (d. 1561)
  - Anna Bielke, Swedish noble and commander (d. 1525)
  - David Reubeni, Jewish political activist and mystic (d. 1541)
- probable
  - Wijerd Jelckama, Frisian rebel and warlord (d. 1523)
  - Adriaen Isenbrandt, Flemish painter (d. 1551)
  - Richard Rich, 1st Baron Rich, Lord Chancellor of England (d. 1567)
  - María de Toledo, Vicereine and regent of the Spanish Colony of Santo Domingo (d. 1549)
  - John Taverner, English composer and organist (d. 1545)
  - María de Salinas, Lady Willoughby, Spanish lady-in-waiting and friend to Catherine of Aragon
  - Quilago, queen regnant of the Cochasquí in Ecuador (d. 1515)

1491

- January 30 – Francesco Sforza, Italian noble (d. 1512)
- March 25 – Marie d'Albret, Countess of Rethel, French nobility (d. 1549)
- May 10 – Suzanne, Duchess of Bourbon (d. 1521)
- June 28 – Henry VIII (d. 1547)
- August 3 – Maria of Jülich-Berg, spouse of John III, Duke of Cleves (d. 1543)
- August 10 – Queen Janggyeong, Korean royal consort (d. 1515)
- August 25 – Innocenzo Cybo, Catholic cardinal (d. 1550)
- October 6 – Francis de Bourbon, Count of St. Pol, French noble (d. 1545)
- c. October 23 – Ignatius of Loyola, Spanish founder of the Society of Jesus, a Roman Catholic religious order (d. 1556)
- October 26 – Zhengde Emperor of China (d. 1521)
- November 8 – Teofilo Folengo, Italian poet (d. 1544)
- November 11 – Martin Bucer, German Protestant reformer (d. 1551)
- December 13 – Martín de Azpilcueta, Spanish theologian and economist (d. 1586)
- December 31 – Jacques Cartier, French explorer (d. 1557)
- date unknown
  - Lapulapu, Filipino king (d. 1542)
  - Azai Sukemasa, Japanese samurai and warlord (d. 1546)
  - Isabella Losa, Spanish scholar (d. 1564)
- probable
  - George Blaurock, Swiss founder of Anabaptism (d. 1529)
  - Antonio Pigafetta, Italian explorer (d. 1534)

1492

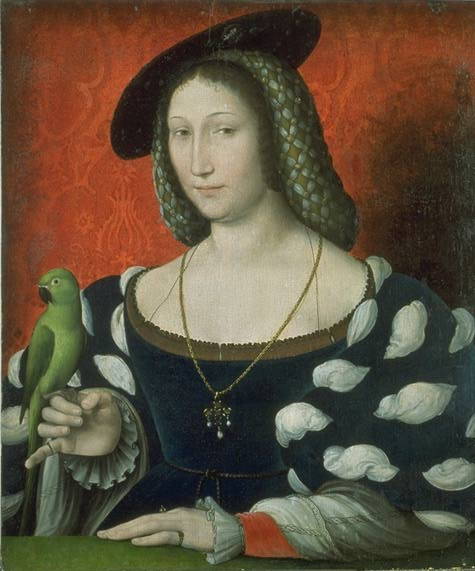
Queen Marguerite de Navarre

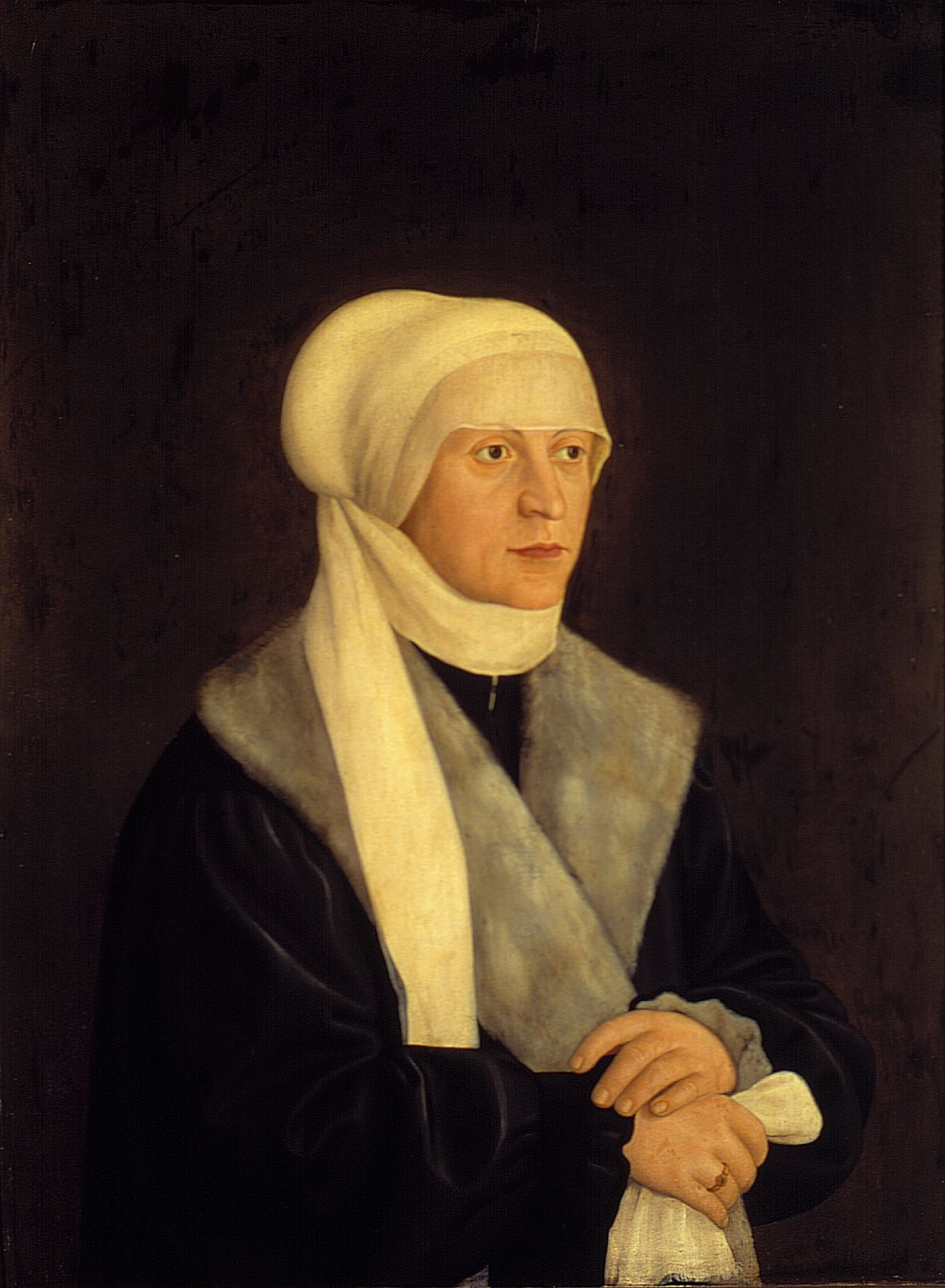
Duchess Sabina of Bavaria

- January 22 – Beatrix of Baden, Margravine of Baden, Countess Palatine consort of Simmern (d. 1535)
- March 4 – Francesco de Layolle, Italian composer (d. c. 1540)
- March 21 – John II, Count Palatine of Simmern, Count Palatine of Simmern (1509-1557) (d. 1557)
- March 27 – Adam Ries, German mathematician (d. 1559)
- April 4 – Ambrosius Blarer, influential reformer in southern Germany and north-eastern Switzerland (d. 1564)
- April 6 – Maud Green, English noble (d. 1531)
- April 11 – Marguerite de Navarre, queen of Henry II of Navarre (d. 1549)
- April 20 – Pietro Aretino, Italian author (d. 1556)
- April 24 – Duchess Sabina of Bavaria (d. 1564)
- May 8 – Andrea Alciato, Italian jurist and writer (d. 1550)
- June 4 – Hirate Masahide, Japanese retainer and tutor of Oda Nobunaga (d. 1553)
- August 1 – Wolfgang, Prince of Anhalt-Köthen, German prince (d. 1566)
- August 8 – Matteo Tafuri, Italian alchemist (d. 1582)
- September 12 – Lorenzo de' Medici, Duke of Urbino (d. 1519)
- September 29 – Chamaraja Wodeyar III, King of Mysore (d. 1553)
- October 1 – Georg Rörer, German theologian (d. 1557)
- October 11 – Charles Orlando, Dauphin of France, French noble (d. 1495)
- October 30 – Anne d'Alençon, French noblewoman (d. 1562)
- November 12 – Johan Rantzau, German general (d. 1565)
- November 27 – Donato Giannotti, Italian writer (d. 1573)
- date unknown
  - Argula von Grumbach, German Protestant reformer (d. 1554)
  - Berchtold Haller, Swiss reformer (d. 1536)
  - Amago Kunihisa, Japanese nobleman (d. 1554)
  - Giacomo Aconcio, Italian pioneer of religious tolerance (d. 1566)
  - Edward Wotton, English physician and zoologist (d. 1555)
- probable
  - Thomas Manners, 1st Earl of Rutland (d. 1543)
  - Fernán Pérez de Oliva, Spanish man of letters (d. 1531)
  - Polidoro da Caravaggio, Italian painter (d. 1543)
  - Bernal Díaz del Castillo, Spanish historian (d. 1584)

1493

- January 2 – Louis de Bourbon de Vendôme, French cardinal (d. 1557)
- January 6 – Olaus Petri, Swedish clergyman (d. 1552)
- January 9 – Johann of Brandenburg-Ansbach, Viceroy of Valencia, German noble (d. 1525)
- January 25 – Maximilian Sforza, Duke of Milan (d. 1530)
- January 26
  - Min Bin, king of Arakan (d. 1554)
  - Giovanni Poggio, Italian cardinal and diplomat (d. 1556)
  - Ippolita Maria Sforza, Italian noble (d. 1501)
- February 9 – Helen of the Palatinate, Duchess of Pomerania (d. 1524)
- March 15 – Anne de Montmorency, Constable of France (d. 1567)
- April 11 – George I, Duke of Pomerania from the House of Griffins (d. 1531)
- April 25 – Giovanni Gaddi, Italian priest (d. 1542)
- May 5 – Alessandro Pasqualini, Italian architect (d. 1559)
- May 6 – Girolamo Seripando, Catholic cardinal (d. 1563)
- June 5 – Justus Jonas, German Protestant reformer (d. 1555)
- June 10 – Anton Fugger, German merchant (d. 1560)
- September 28 – Agnolo Firenzuola, Italian poet and litterateur (d. 1543)
- September 29 – Yi Gwang-sik, Korean politician and general (d. 1563)
- October 14 – Shimazu Tadayoshi, Japanese warlord (d. 1568)
- October 17 – Bartolommeo Bandinelli, Renaissance Italian sculptor (d. 1560)
- November 11 – Bernardo Tasso, Italian courtier and poet (d. 1569)
- November 11 or December 17 – Paracelsus, born Philippus von Hohenheim, Swiss physician and scientist (d. 1541)
- November 17 – John Neville, 3rd Baron Latimer, English politician (d. 1543)
- November 25 – Osanna of Cattaro, Dominican visionary and anchoress (d. 1565)
- December 9 – Íñigo López de Mendoza, 4th Duke of the Infantado (d. 1566)
- December 25 – Antoinette de Bourbon, French noblewoman (d. 1583)
- December 27 – Johann Pfeffinger, German theologian (d. 1573)
- December 31 – Eleonora Gonzaga, Duchess of Urbino, Italian politically active duchess (d. 1570)
- date unknown
  - Jobst II, Count of Hoya (d. 1545)
  - Simon Grynaeus, German scholar and theologian (d. 1541)
  - Matsudaira Shigeyoshi, Japanese general (d. 1580)
- probable
  - Jean du Bellay, French cardinal and diplomat (d. 1560)
  - Robert Maxwell, 5th Lord Maxwell, Scottish statesman (d. 1546)

1494

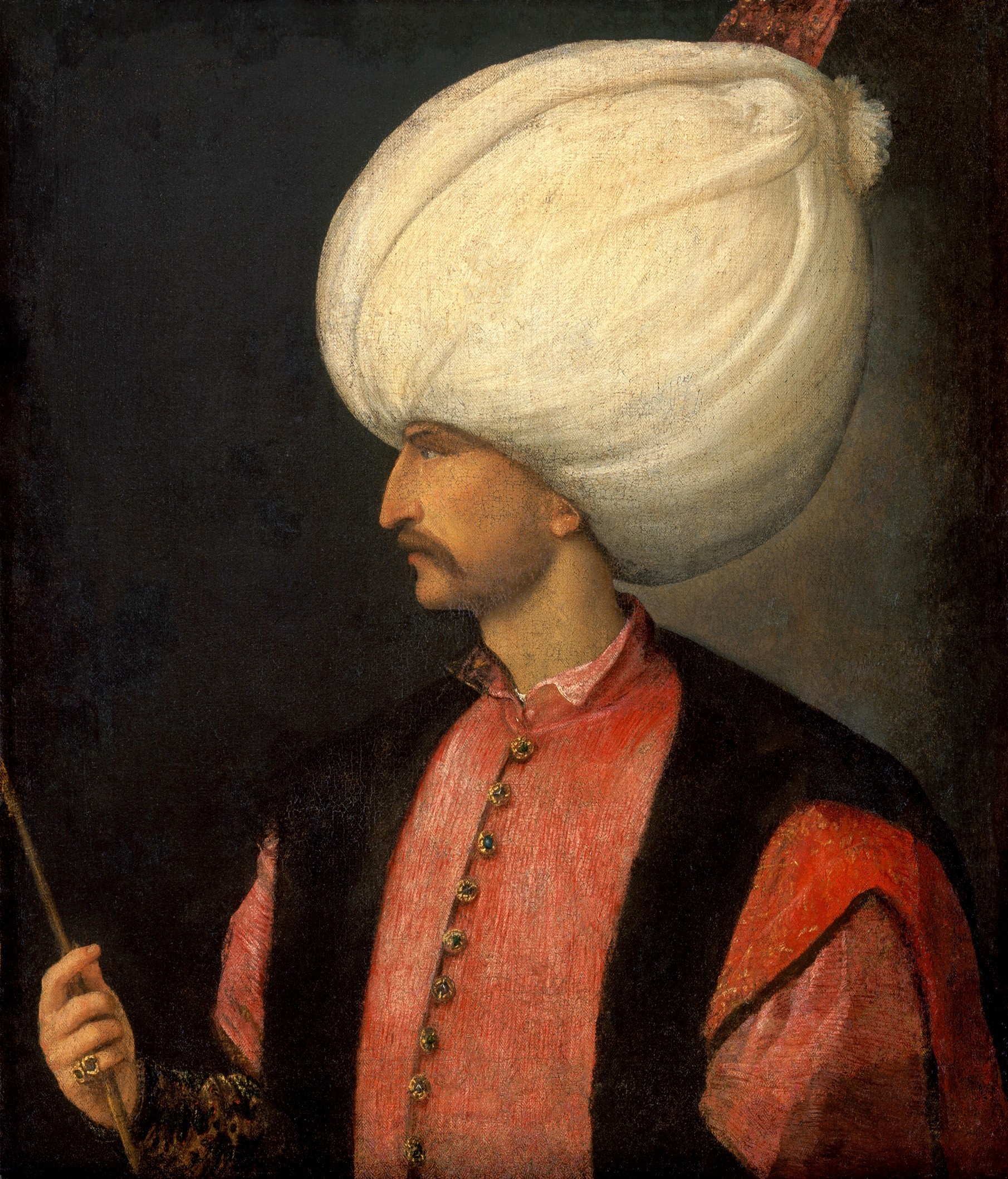
Suleiman the Magnificent

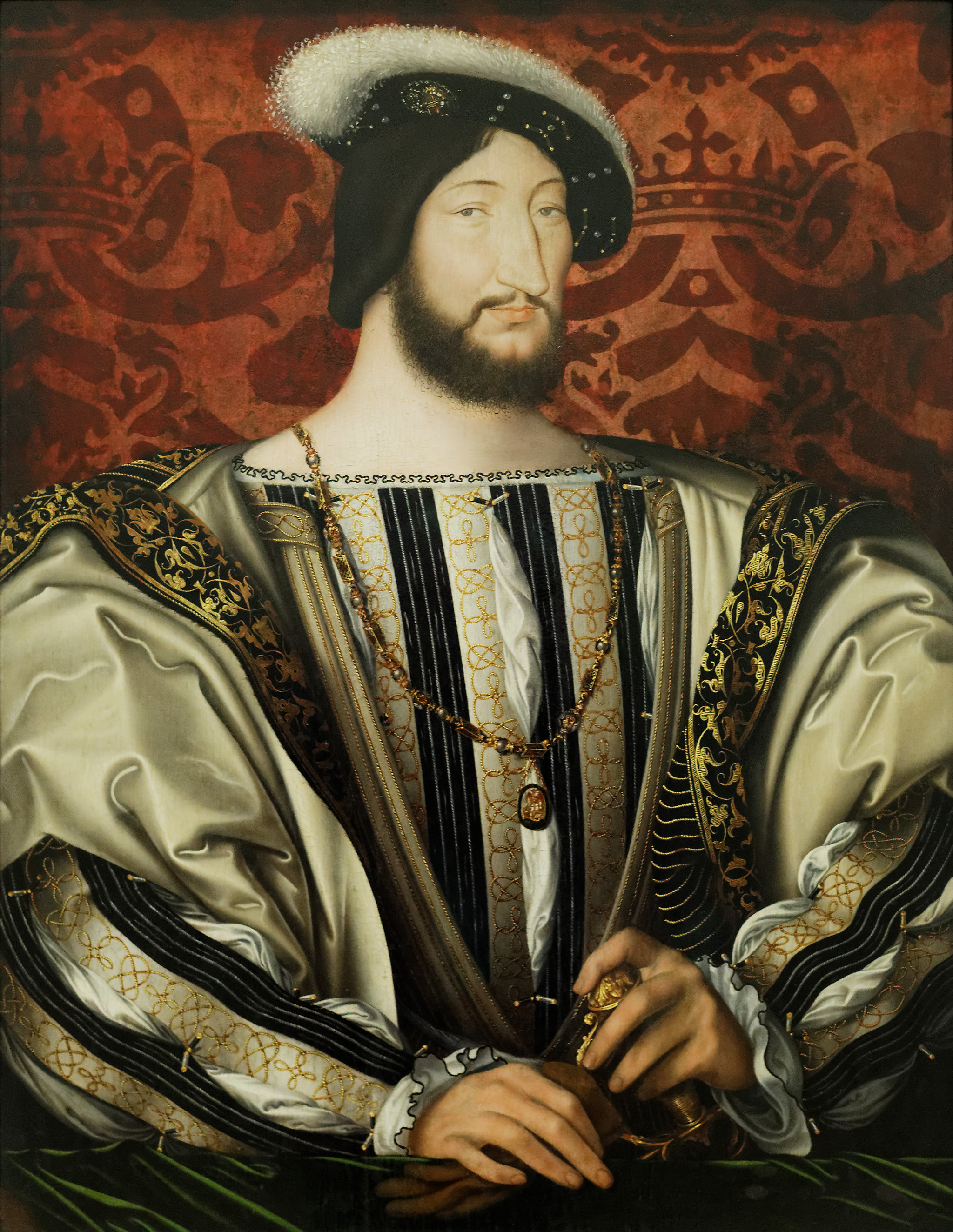
Francis I of France

- February 2 – Bona Sforza, queen of Sigismund I of Poland (d. 1557)
- February 11 – Takeda Nobutora, Japanese warlord (d. 1574)
- February 20 – Johan Friis, Danish statesman (d. 1570)
- March 24 – Georgius Agricola, German mineralogist and scholar (d. 1555)
- March 25 – Elisabeth of Brandenburg-Ansbach-Kulmbach, Margravine (d. 1518)
- April 4 – Ambrosius Moibanus, German theologian (d. 1554)
- April 20 – Johannes Agricola, German Protestant reformer (d. 1566)
- April 25 – Juan Téllez-Girón, 4th Count of Ureña, Spanish count (d. 1558)
- May 24 – Pontormo, Italian painter (d. 1557)
- August 18 – Johannes Scheubel, German mathematician (d. 1570)
- September 8 – Sri Chand, Indian founder of the ascetic sect of Udasi (d. 1629)
- September 11 – Elisabeth of Brunswick-Lüneburg, Duchess of Guelders (1518–1538) (d. 1572)
- September 12 – King Francis I of France (d. 1547)
- October 31 – Wolfgang of the Palatinate, Count Palatine of Neumarkt (1524–1558), governor of the Upper Palatinate (d. 1558)
- November 5 – Hans Sachs, German meistersinger ("mastersinger") (d. 1576)
- November 6 – Suleiman the Magnificent, Ottoman Sultan (d. 1566)
- November 12 – Margaret of Anhalt-Köthen, Princess of Anhalt by birth, Duchess consort of Saxony (d. 1521)
- November (probable) – François Rabelais, French Renaissance writer (d. 1553)
- date unknown
  - Alonso Álvarez de Pineda, Spanish explorer and cartographer (d. 1519)
  - Christina Gyllenstierna, Swedish national heroine (d. 1559)
  - Ambrosius Holbein, German painter (d. 1519)
  - Qiu Ying, Chinese painter (d. 1552)
  - Saitō Dōsan, Japanese warlord (d. 1556)
  - John Sutton, 3rd Baron Dudley (d. 1554)
  - Hans Tausen, Danish religious reformer (d. 1561)

1495

- January 26 – Emperor Go-Nara of Japan (d. 1557)
- February 4
  - Francesco II Sforza, Duke of Milan (d. 1535)
  - Jean Parisot de Valette, Grand Master of the Knights Hospitaller (d. 1568)
- February 13 – Giacomo Puteo, Spanish cardinal (d. 1563)
- March 6 – Luigi Alamanni, Italian poet and statesman (d. 1556)
- March 8 – John of God, Portuguese friar and saint (d. 1550)
- March 26 – Michele Antonio, Marquess of Saluzzo (d. 1528)
- March 29 – Leonhard Päminger, Austrian composer (d. 1567)
- April 16 – Petrus Apianus, German humanist (d. 1552)
- August 1 – Jan van Scorel, Dutch painter (d. 1562)
- August 24 – Otto I, Duke of Brunswick-Harburg, Prince of Lüneburg and Baron of Harburg (d. 1549)
- September 18 – Louis X, Duke of Bavaria, German noble (d. 1545)
- September 20 – Gian Matteo Giberti, Catholic bishop (d. 1543)
- September 23 – Bagrat III of Imereti, King of Imereti (d. 1565)
- September 24 – Barbara of Brandenburg-Ansbach-Kulmbach, Landgravine of Leuchtenberg (d. 1552)
- November 1 – Erhard Schnepf, German theologian (d. 1558)
- November 21 – John Bale, English churchman (d. 1563)
- December 5 – Nicolas Cleynaerts, Flemish grammarian (d. 1542)
- date unknown
  - Robert Barnes, English reformer and martyr (d. 1540)
  - Cuauhtémoc, 11th Tlatoani (emperor) of Tenochtitlan (modern Mexico City), 1520-1521 (d. 1525)
  - Thomas Wharton, 1st Baron Wharton (d. 1568)
- probable
  - Pedro de Alvarado, Spanish conquistador (d. 1541)
  - Marie Dentière, Genevan Protestant reformer and theologian (d. 1561)
  - Costanzo Festa, Italian composer (d. 1545)
  - Nicolas Gombert, Flemish composer (d. 1560)

1496

- March 18 – Mary Tudor, Queen of Louis XII of France, daughter of Henry VII of England (d. 1533)
- May 12 – King Gustav Vasa of Sweden (d. 1560)
- July 10 – Johann Forster, German theologian (d. 1558)
- August 28 – Konrad Heresbach, German Calvinist (d. 1576)
- September 27 – Hieronymus Łaski, Polish diplomat (d. 1542)
- October 20 – Claude, Duke of Guise, French aristocrat and general (d. 1550)
- November 23 – Clément Marot, French poet of the Renaissance period (d. 1544)
- December 20 – Joseph ha-Kohen, Spanish-born French Jewish historian and physician (d. 1575)
- December 21 – Elisabeth Corvinus, Hungarian princess (d. 1508)
- date unknown
  - Lazare de Baïf, French diplomat and author (d. 1547)
  - João de Barros, Portuguese historian (d. 1570)
  - Cuauhtémoc, 11th Tlatoani (emperor) of Tenochtitlan (modern Mexico City), 1520–1521, (d. 1521)
  - Dirck Jacobsz., Dutch painter (d. 1567)
  - Richard Maitland, Scottish poet (d. 1586)
  - Louise de Montmorency, French noblewoman (d. 1547)
  - Martín Ocelotl, Mexican priest (d. c. 1537)
  - William Roper, son-in-law and biographer of Thomas More (d. 1578)
  - Giovanni Battista da Sangallo, Italian architect (d. 1548)
  - Menno Simons, Dutch Anabaptist leader (d. 1561)
  - Agostino Steuco, Italian humanist scholar (d. 1548)
  - Johann Walter, Lutheran composer and poet (d. 1570)
- probable – Henry Somerset, 2nd Earl of Worcester (d. 1549)
  - María Pacheco, Spanish heroine and defender of Toledo (d. 1531)

1497

- February 16 – Philip Melanchthon, German humanist and reformer (d. 1560)
- February 19 – Matthäus Schwarz, German fashion writer (d. 1574)
- March – Giovanni Paolo I Sforza, Italian condottiero (d. 1535)
- April 2 – Georg Giese, German merchant (d. 1562)
- April 16 – Mōri Motonari, Japanese daimyō (d. 1571)
- April 17 – Pedro de Valdivia, Spanish conquistador (d. 1553)
- May 3 – Wilhelm IV of Eberstein, President of the Reichskammergericht (d. 1562)
- May 21 – Al-Hattab, Tripolitanian Muslim jurist (d. 1547)
- June 27 – Ernest I, Duke of Brunswick-Lüneburg (d. 1546)
- July 15 – Francis of Denmark, Danish prince (d. 1511)
- August 18 – Francesco Canova da Milano, Italian composer (d. 1543)
- September 10 – Wolfgang Musculus, German theologian (d. 1563)
- October 29 – Benedetto Accolti the Younger, Italian cardinal (d. 1549)
- date unknown
  - Jean Fernel, French physician (d. 1558)
  - Gonzalo de Sandoval, Spanish conquistador (d. 1528)
  - Margareta Eriksdotter Vasa, Swedish noblewoman (d. 1536)
  - Johann Wild, German preacher (d. 1554)
- probable
  - Francesco Berni, Italian poet (d. 1536)
  - John Heywood, English playwright (d. 1580)

1498

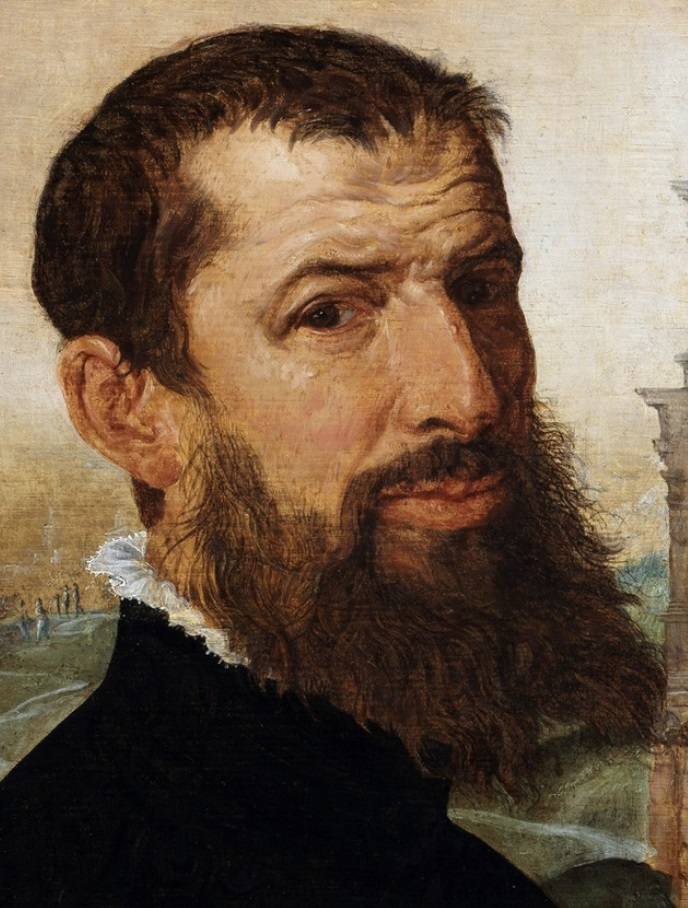
Maarten van Heemskerck born 1 June

- January 31 – Tiberio Crispo, Italian clergyman (d. 1566)
- February 4 – George I of Württemberg-Mömpelgard (d. 1558)
- February 21 – Ralph Neville, 4th Earl of Westmorland, English earl (d. 1549)
- February 25 – Francesco of Saluzzo, Marquess of Saluzzo (d. 1537)
- April 5 – Giovanni dalle Bande Nere, Italian condottiero (d. 1526)
- April 9 – Jean, Cardinal of Lorraine, French churchman (d. 1550)
- June 1 – Maarten van Heemskerck, Dutch painter (d. 1574)d
- June 30 – Wilhelm von Brandenburg, Archbishop of Riga (d. 1563)
- July 25 – Hernando de Aragón, Spanish Catholic archbishop (d. 1575)
- August 23 – Miguel da Paz, Prince of Portugal (d. 1500)
- August 24 – John, Hereditary Prince of Saxony, German prince (d. 1537)
- November 1 – Giovanni Ricci, Italian cardinal (d. 1574)
- November 15 – Eleanor of Austria, Queen of Portugal and France (d. 1558)
- December 1 – Giovanni Michele Saraceni, Italian Catholic cardinal (d. 1568)
- December 19 – Andreas Osiander, German Protestant theologian (d. 1552)
- date unknown
  - Giulio Clovio, (Juraj Julije Klovic) Dalmatian miniaturist and illustrator (d. 1578)
  - Anna of Masovia, Polish princess (d. 1557)
  - Meera, Rajput princess (d. 1547)
  - Sagara Taketō, Japanese retainer (d. 1551)
  - Pier Paolo Vergerio, Italian religious reformer (d. 1565)
  - Felix Manz, leader of the Swiss Anabaptists (d. 1527)

1499

- January 15 – Samuel Maciejowski, Polish bishop (d. 1550)
- January 20 – Sebastian Franck, German humanist (d. 1543)
- January 29 – Katharina von Bora, German nun, wife of Martin Luther (d. 1552)
- February 10 – Thomas Platter, Swiss humanist scholar and writer (d. 1582)
- March 22 – Johann Carion, German astrologer and chronicler (d. 1537)
- March 31 – Pope Pius IV (d. 1565)
- May 14 – Agostino Gallo, Italian agronomist (d. 1570)
- June 24 – Johannes Brenz, German theologian and Protestant Reformer of the Duchy of Württemberg (d. 1570)
- July 17 – Maria Salviati, Italian noble and mother of Cosimo I de Medici (d. 1543)
- August 14 – John de Vere, 14th Earl of Oxford, English noble (d. 1526)
- September 3 – Diane de Poitiers, French duchess, mistress of Henry II of France (d. 1566)
- October 13 – Claude of France, queen consort of France, daughter of Louis XII (d. 1524)
- October 14 – Catherine of the Palatinate, Abbess of Neuburg am Neckar (d. 1526)
- October 31 – Günther XL, Count of Schwarzburg (1526–1552) (d. 1552)
- November 1 – Rodrigo of Aragon, Italian noble (d. 1512)
- December 8 – Sebald Heyden, German musicologist and theologian (d. 1561)
- December 13 – Justus Menius, German Lutheran pastor (d. 1558)
- date unknown
  - Hans Asper, Swiss painter (d. 1571)
  - Michael Coxcie, Flemish painter (d. 1592)
  - Cesare Hercolani, Italian military leader (d. 1534)
  - Jan Łaski, Polish Protestant reformer (d. 1560)
  - Laurentius Petri, Archbishop of Uppsala (d. 1573)
  - Giulio Romano, Italian painter (d. 1546)
  - Bernardino de Sahagún, Franciscan missionary (d. 1590)
  - Niccolò Fontana Tartaglia, Italian mathematician (d. 1557)
  - Ming, Icelandic clam (d. 2006)
- probable – Juan Rodríguez Cabrillo, Portuguese explorer (d. 1543)

== Deaths ==
1490

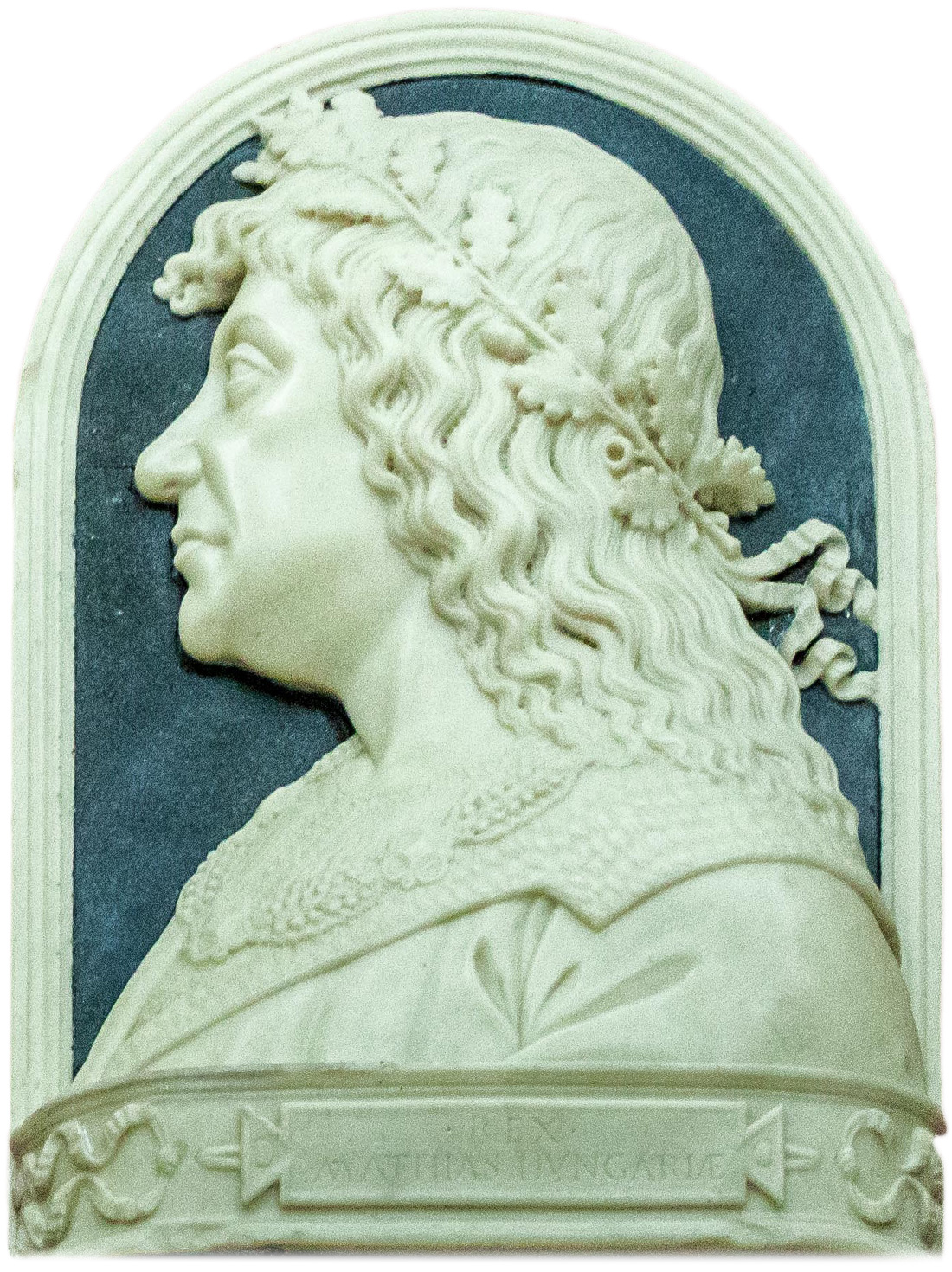
King Matthias Corvinus

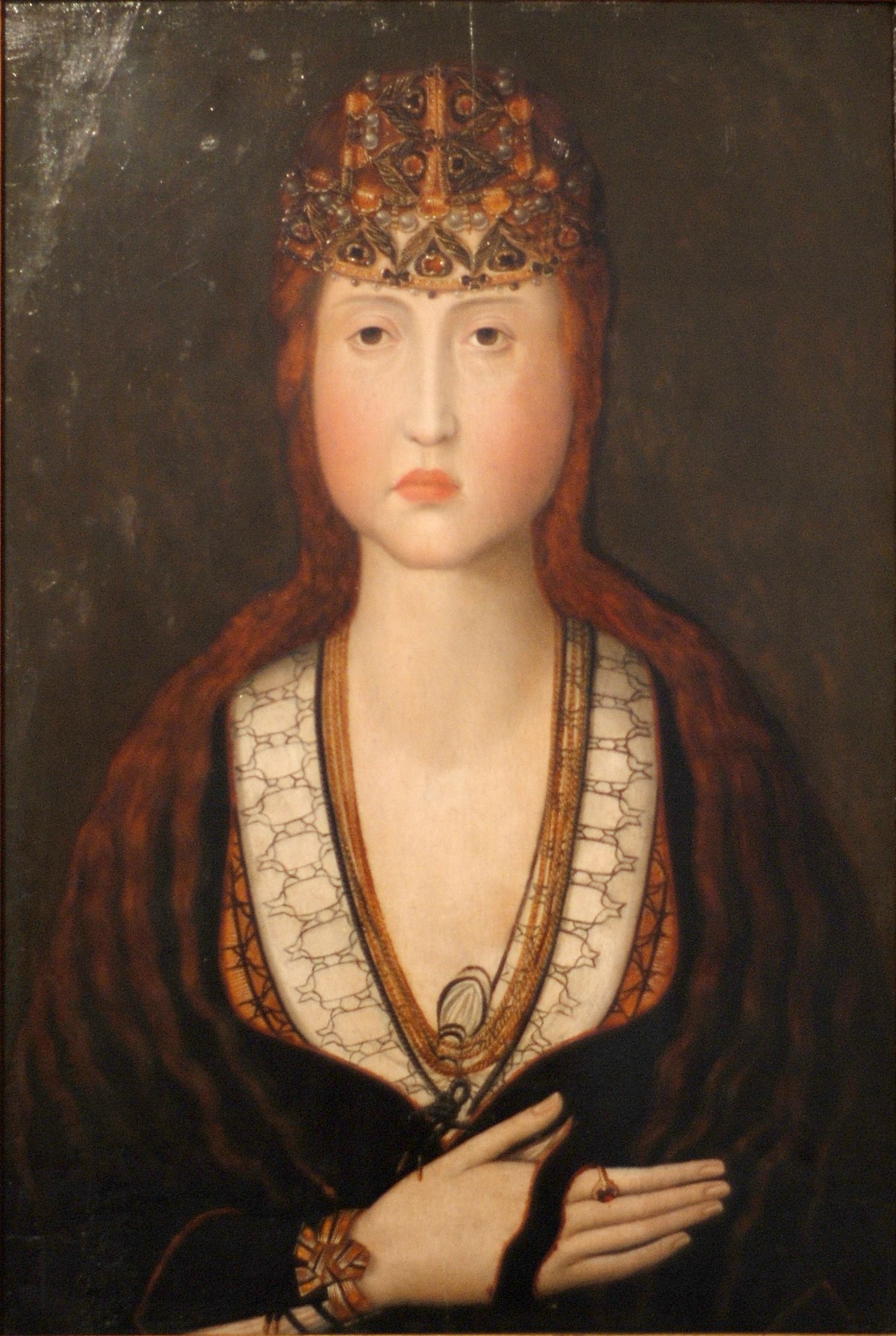
Blessed Joanna

- January 27 – Ashikaga Yoshimasa, Japanese shōgun (b. 1435)
- March 6 – Ivan the Young, Ruler of Tver (b. 1458)
- April 6 – King Matthias Corvinus of Hungary (b. 1443)
- May 12 – Joanna, Portuguese Roman Catholic blessed and regent (b. 1452)
- May 22 – Edmund Grey, 1st Earl of Kent (b. 1416)
- August 11 – Frans van Brederode, Dutch rebel leader (b. 1465)
- date unknown
  - Martí Joan de Galba, Catalan novelist
  - Aonghas Óg, last independent Lord of the Isles

1491

- January 19 – Dorothea of Brandenburg, Duchess of Mecklenburg (b. 1420)
- February 15 – Ashikaga Yoshimi, brother of Shōgun Ashikaga Yoshimasa (b. 1439)
- February 19 – Enno I, Count of East Frisia (1466–1491) (b. 1460)
- March 6 – Richard Woodville, 3rd Earl Rivers
- March 31 – Bonaventura Tornielli, Italian Roman Catholic priest (b. 1411)
- May 14 – Filippo Strozzi the Elder, Italian banker (b. 1428)
- July 13 – Afonso, Prince of Portugal (b. 1475)
- July 16 – William Herbert, 2nd Earl of Pembroke, English earl (b. 1451)
- October 5 – Jean Balue, French cardinal and statesman (b. c. 1421)
- October 12 – Fritz Herlen, German artist (b. 1449)
- November 16 – Holy Child of La Guardia, Spanish folk saint (b. n/a)
- December 28 – Bertoldo di Giovanni, Italian sculptor (b. c. 1435)
- date unknown – Anne of Orléans, Abbess of Fontevraud (b. 1464)
- date unknown – Musa ibn Abi al-Ghassan, knight of Granada
- probable
  - February 9 (according to the Libro dei Morti) – Antonia di Paolo di Dono, Italian artist and daughter of Paolo di Dono

1492

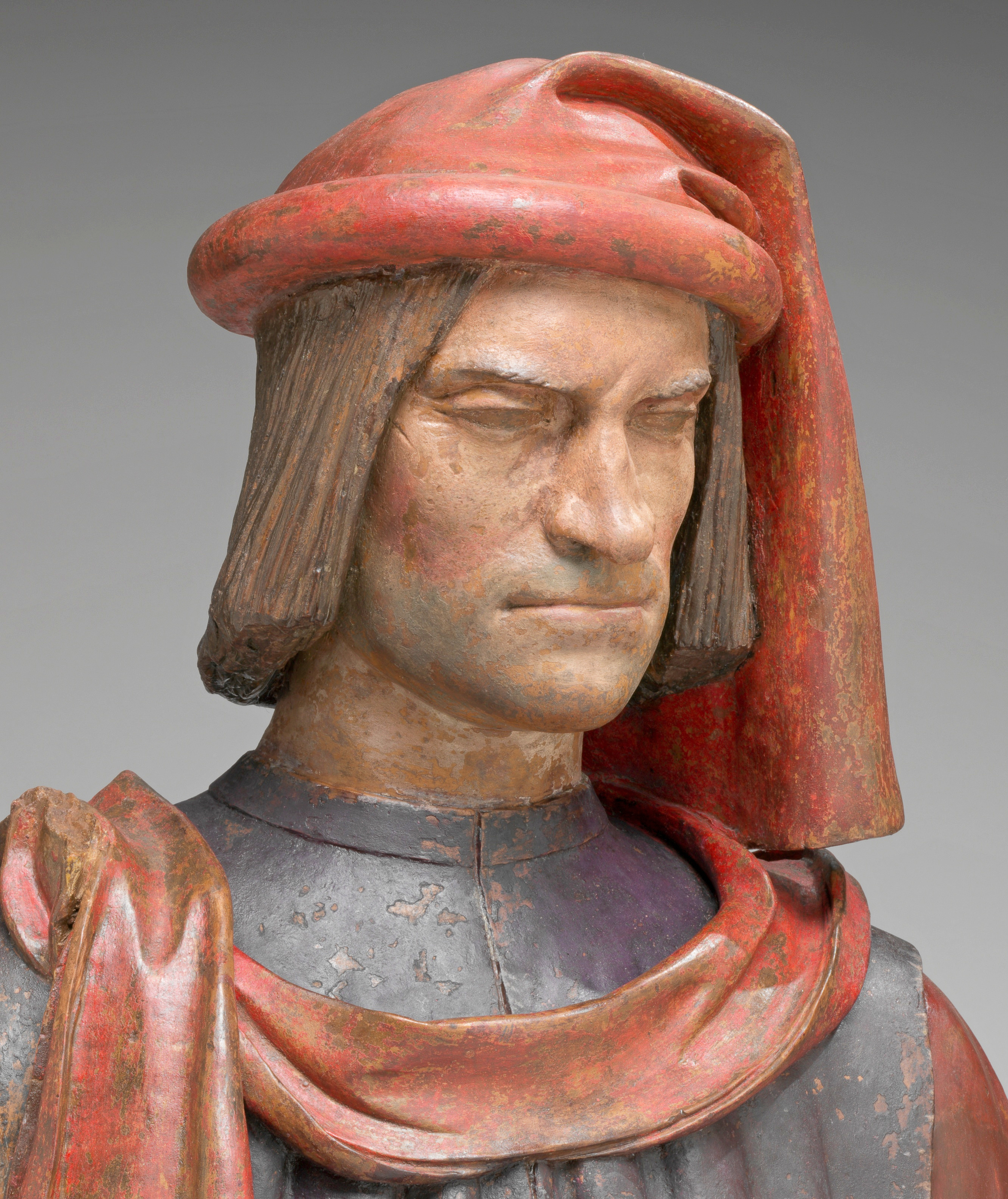
Lorenzo de' Medici

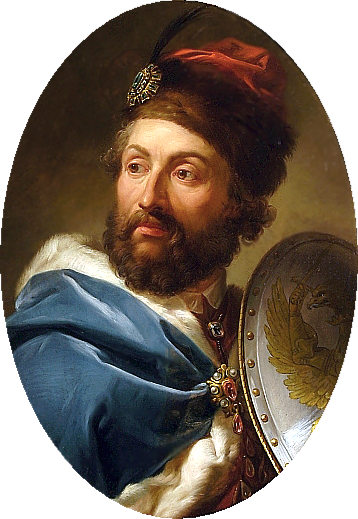
King Casimir IV Jagiellon

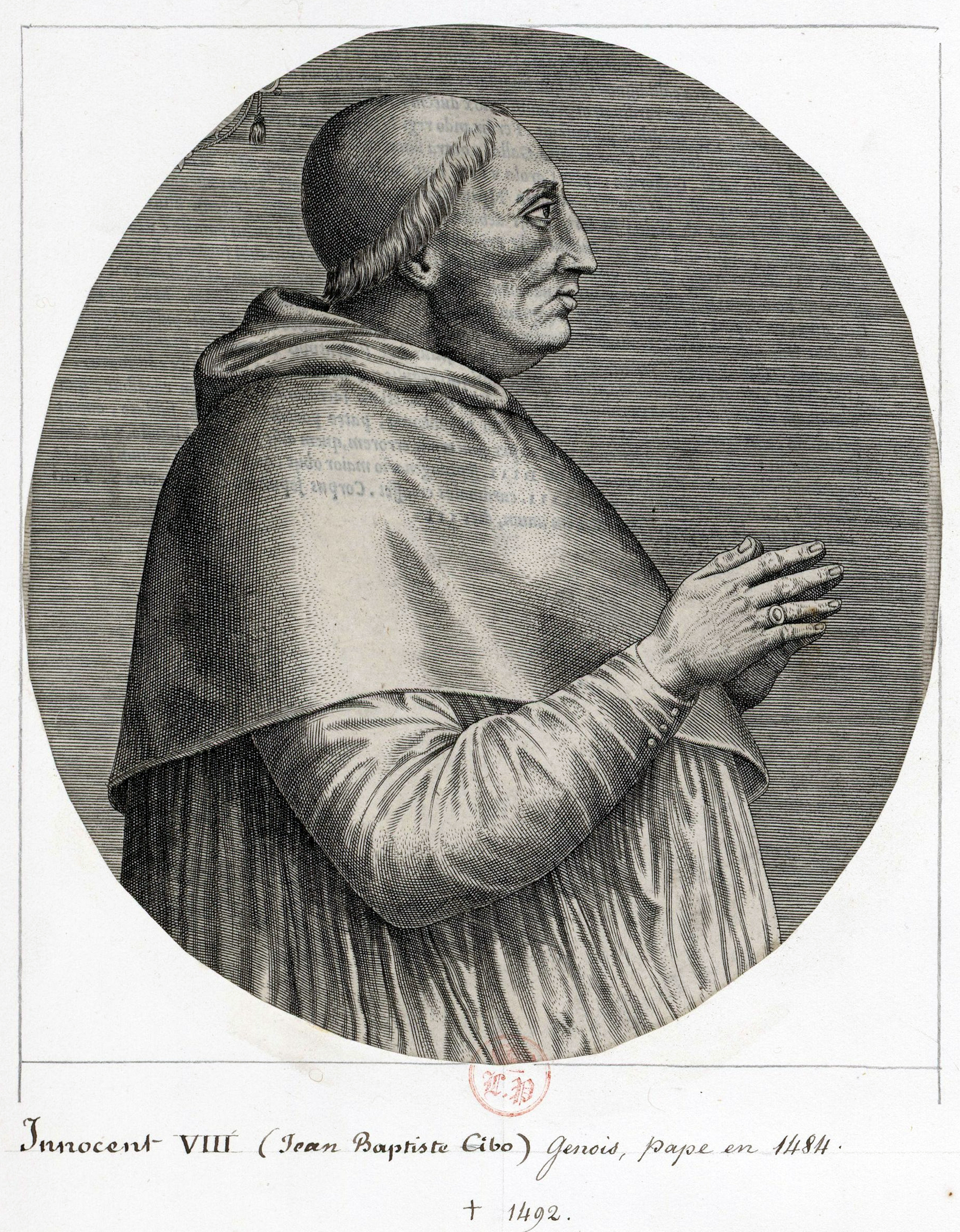
Pope Innocent VIII

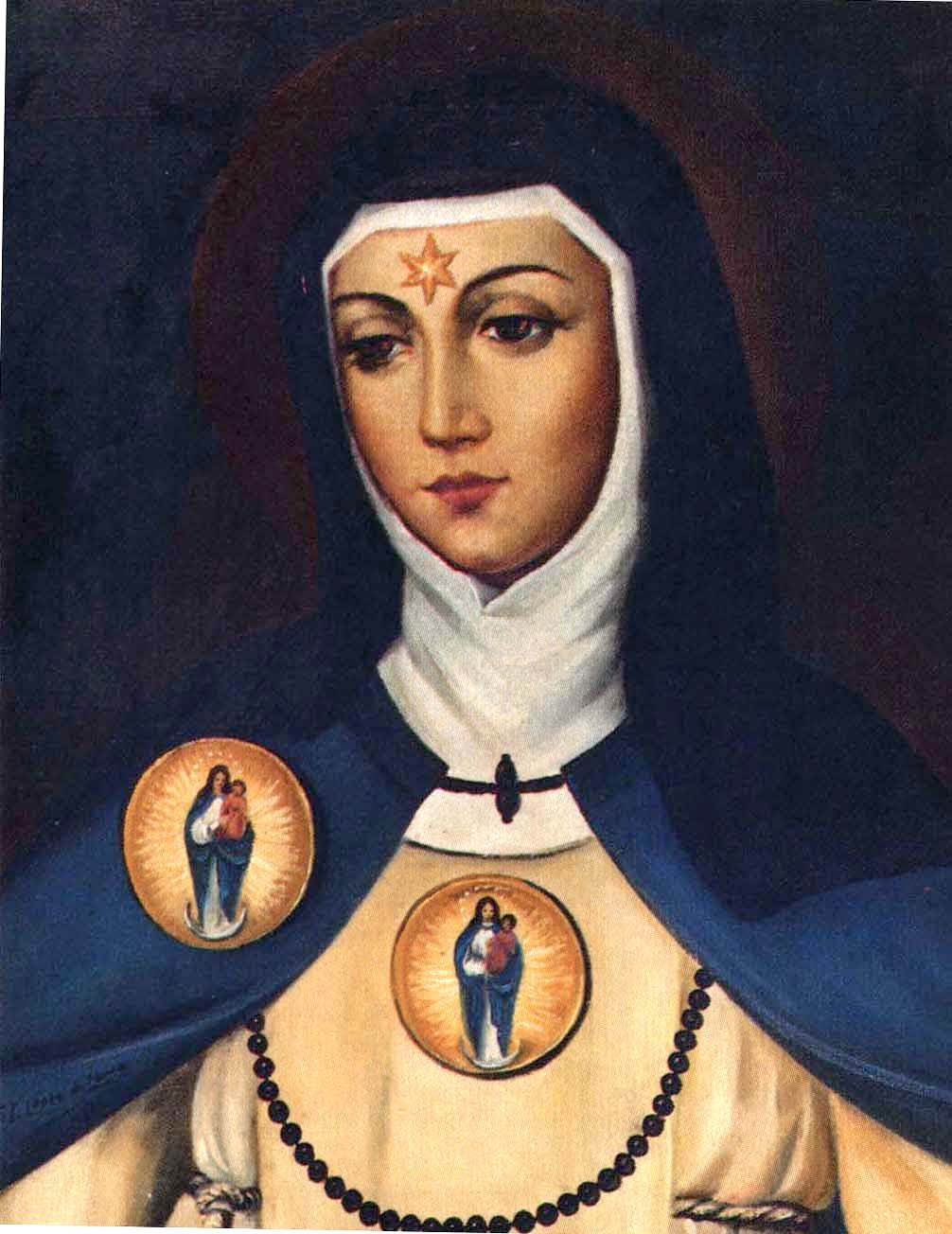
Saint Beatrice of Silva

- January 25 – Ygo Gales Galama, Frisian warlord and freedom-fighting rebel (murdered) (b. 1443)
- April 8 – Lorenzo de' Medici, ruler of Florence (b. 1449)
- March 19 – Philip II, Count of Nassau-Weilburg (1429–1492) (b. 1418)
- c. May 21 – John de la Pole, 2nd Duke of Suffolk (b. 1442)
- June 7 – Casimir IV Jagiellon, King of Poland (b. 1427)
- June 8 – Elizabeth Woodville, Queen of Edward IV of England (b. 1437)
- July 1 – Henry the Younger of Poděbrady, Bohemian nobleman (b. 1452)
- July 25 – Pope Innocent VIII (b. 1432)
- August 9 – Beatrice of Silva, Spanish Dominican and Roman Catholic nun and a saint
- September 20 – Anne Neville, Countess of Warwick (b. 1426)
- September 23 – Peter Courtenay, English bishop and politician
- October 12 – Piero della Francesca, Italian artist (b. c. 1412)
- October 25 – Thaddeus McCarthy, Irish bishop (b. c. 1455)
- November 6 – Antoine Busnois, French composer and poet (b. c. 1430)
- November 9 – Jami, Persian poet (b. 1414)
- November 24 – Loys of Gruuthuse, Earl of Winchester (b. c. 1427)
- Ali al-Jabarti, Somali scholar and politician
- Baccio Pontelli, Italian architect (b. c. 1450)
- Dhammazedi, Burmese king of Hanthawaddy (b. 1409)
- Eric Clauesson, Swedish Norse pagan
- Satal Rathore, Rao of Marwar
- Sonni Ali, Songhai ruler

1493

- May – Pietro Antonio Solari, Italian architect (b. 1450)
- May 10 – Colin Campbell, 1st Earl of Argyll, Scottish politician (b. c. 1433)
- May 14 – Nannina de' Medici, member of de' Medici family (b. 1448)
- June 14 – Ermolao Barbaro, Italian scholar (b. 1454)
- August 19 – Frederick III, Holy Roman Emperor (b. 1415)
- September 9 – Mirko Derenčin, Croatian leader
- October 11 – Eleanor of Naples, Duchess of Ferrara (b. 1450)
- October 22 – James Douglas, 1st Earl of Morton
- November 6 – Andrey Bolshoy, Russian prince (b. 1446)
- date unknown
  - Ahmad Zarruq, Moroccan scholar and Sufi sheikh (b. 1442)
  - James Blount, English soldier
  - Isabel Bras Williamson, Scottish merchant (b. 1430)
  - Kim Si-sŭp, Korean scholar and author (b. 1435)
  - Martín Alonso Pinzón, Spanish navigator and explorer (b. c. 1441)
  - Tupac Inca Yupanqui, Inca ruler of Tahuantinsuyu

1494

- January 11 – Domenico Ghirlandaio, Italian artist (b. 1449)
- January 20 – Seongjong of Joseon, King of Joseon (b. 1457)
- January 25 – King Ferdinand I of Naples (b. 1423)
- May 7 – Eskender, Emperor of Ethiopia (b. 1471)
- August 1 – Giovanni Santi, Italian artist and father of Raphael (b. c. 1435)
- August 11 – Hans Memling, Flemish painter (b. c. 1430)
- September 24 – Poliziano, Italian humanist (b. 1454)
- October 21 – Gian Galeazzo Sforza, Duke of Milan (b. 1469)
- October 26 – Amda Seyon II, Emperor of Ethiopia (b. c. 1487)
- November 8 – Melozzo da Forlì, Italian painter (b. c. 1438)
- November 15 – William Calthorpe, English knight (b. 1410)
- November 16 – Theda Ukena, countess regent of East Frisia (b. 1432)
- November 17 – Giovanni Pico della Mirandola, Italian humanist (b. 1463)
- December 19 or December 20 – Matteo Maria Boiardo, Italian poet (b. c. 1434-1441)

1495

- January 11 – Pedro González de Mendoza, Spanish cardinal and statesman (b. 1428)
- January 21 – Magdalena of France, French princess and regent of Navarre (b. 1443)
- February 25 – Sultan Cem, pretender to the Ottoman throne (b. 1459)
- May 31 – Cecily Neville, English duchess, mother of Edward IV of England and Richard III of England (b. 1415)
- September – Vlad Călugărul, Wallachian half-brother of Vlad III (The Impaler)
- September 14 – Elizabeth Tudor, English princess, daughter of Henry VII of England (b. 1492)
- October 25 – King John II of Portugal (b. 1455)
- October 30 – Francis, Count of Vendome (b. 1470)
- December 16 – Charles Orlando, Dauphin of France, French noble (b. 1492)
- December 18 – King Alphonso II of Naples (b. 1448)
- December 21 – Jasper Tudor, 1st Duke of Bedford (b. c. 1431)

1496

- January 1 – Charles, Count of Angoulême (b. 1459)
- February 24 – Eberhard I, Duke of Württemberg (b. 1445)
- March 4 – Sigismund, Archduke of Austria (b. 1427)
- March 12 – Johann Heynlin, German humanist scholar (b. c. 1425)
- April 16 – Charles II, Duke of Savoy (b. 1489)
- April 29 – Fernando de Almada, 2nd Count of Avranches (b. c. 1430)
- August 15 – Infanta Isabella of Portugal, Queen of Castile and León (b. 1428)
- August 28 – Kanutus Johannis, Swedish Franciscan friar, writer and book collector
- September 7 – King Ferdinand II of Naples (b. 1469)
- September 15 – Hugh Clopton, Lord Mayor of London (b. c. 1440)
- September 25 – Piero Capponi, Italian soldier and statesman (b. 1447)
- September 28 – Boček IV of Poděbrady, Bohemian nobleman, eldest son of King George of Podebrady (b. 1442)
- October 15 – Gilbert, Count of Montpensier (b. 1443)
- November 1 – Filippo Buonaccorsi (Filip Callimachus), Italian humanist writer (b. 1437)
- date unknown
  - Richard Bell, Bishop of Carlisle
  - Alexander Inglis, Scottish clergyman
  - Pietro di Francesco degli Orioli, Italian sculptor (b. c. 1458)
  - Piero del Pollaiuolo, Italian painter (b. 1443)
  - Qaitbay, sultan of Egypt
  - Ercole de' Roberti, Italian artist (b. c. 1451)
- probable – Jan IV of Oświęcim, duke of Oświęcim

1497

- January 3 – Beatrice d'Este, Duchess of Milan (b. 1475)
- January 30 – Lê Thánh Tông, Emperor of Vietnam (b. 1442)
- February 6 – Johannes Ockeghem, Flemish composer (b. c. 1410)
- May 26 – Antonio Manetti, Italian mathematician and architect (b. 1423)
- June 14 – Giovanni Borgia, 2nd Duke of Gandía (assassinated) (b.1474)
- June 27
  - Michael An Gof, Cornish rebel leader (executed)
  - Thomas Flamank, Cornish rebel leader (executed)
- June 28 – James Tuchet, 7th Baron Audley (b. c. 1463)
- July – Estêvão da Gama, Portuguese explorer ( b. c. 1430)
- July 23 – Barbara Fugger, German banker (b. 1419)
- August 24 – Sophie of Pomerania, Duchess of Pomerania (b. 1435)
- October 4 – John, Prince of Asturias, only son of Ferdinand II of Aragon and Isabella I of Castile (b. 1478)
- November 7 – Philip II, Duke of Savoy (b. 1443)
- November 30 – Anna Sforza, Italian noble (b. 1476)
- date unknown
  - Al-Mutawakkil II, Caliph of Cairo
  - Al-Sakhawi, Egyptian scholar (b. 1428)
  - Albert Brudzewski, Polish astronomer (b. 1445)
  - Gentile de' Becchi, Bishop of Arezzo (b. 1420/1430)
- probable – Elia del Medigo, Italian philosopher (b. 1460)

1498

- February 4 – Antonio del Pollaiuolo, Italian painter (b. c. 1432)
- April 7 – King Charles VIII of France (b. 1470)
- May 23 – Girolamo Savonarola, Italian religious reformer and ruler of Florence (b. 1452; executed)
- June 7 – Anđeo Zvizdović, Bosnian Franciscan friar and evangelist (b. c. 1420)
- July 14 – Gentile Budrioli, Italian astrologer and herbalist
- August 17 – John Scrope, 5th Baron Scrope of Bolton, English baron (b. 1437)
- August 23 – Isabella of Aragon, Queen of Portugal, eldest daughter of Isabella I of Castile and Ferdinand II of Aragon (b. 1470)
- September 14 – Giovanni il Popolano, Italian diplomat (b. 1467)
- September 16 – Tomás de Torquemada, Spanish Dominican friar and first Grand Inquisitor (b. 1420)
- December 7 – Alexander Hegius von Heek, German humanist (b. c. 1443)
- December 19 – Jeanne de Laval, French noble (b. 1433)
- date unknown
  - Tun Perak, Malay general and statesman
  - Domenico Rosselli, Italian sculptor (b. c. 1439)
- probable – Johannes Martini, Flemish composer (b. c. 1440)

1499

- January 9 – John Cicero, Elector of Brandenburg (b. 1455)
- March 24 – Edward Stafford, 2nd Earl of Wiltshire, English nobleman (b. 1470)
- April 7 – Galeotto I Pico, Duke of Mirandola (b. 1442)
- August 29 – Alesso Baldovinetti, Florentine painter (b. 1427)
- October 1 – Marsilio Ficino, Italian philosopher (b. 1433)
- November 23 – Perkin Warbeck, Flemish imposter (b. c. 1474) (executed)
- November 28 – Edward Plantagenet, 17th Earl of Warwick, last male member of the English House of York (b. 1475)
- date unknown
  - Rennyo, leader of the Ikkō sect of Buddhism (b. 1415)
  - Muhammad Rumfa, ruler of Kano
  - Laura Cereta, Italian humanist and feminist (b. 1469)
