= Fritz Herlen =

German artist (died 1491)

Fritz Herlen (or Herlin) (before 1449 – October 12, 1491) was a German artist of the early Swabian school, in the 15th century.

== Biography ==
The date and place of Herlen's birth are unknown, but his name is on the roll of the tax-gatherers of Ulm in 1449; and in 1467 he was made citizen and town painter at Nördlingen, because of his acquaintance with Flemish methods of painting.

One of the first of his acknowledged productions is a shrine on one of the altars of the church of Rothenburg on the Tauber, the wings of which were finished in 1466, with seven scenes from the lives of Christ and the Virgin Mary. In the town-hall of Rothenburg is a Madonna and St Catherine of 1467; and in the choir of Nördlingen cathedral a triptych of 1488, representing the Nativity and Christ amidst the Doctors, at the side of a votive Madonna attended by St Joseph and St Margaret as patrons of a family.

In each of these works the painter's name certifies the picture, and the manner is truly that of an artist acquainted with Flemish methods. We are not told under whom Herlen laboured in the Netherlands, but he probably took the same course as Schöngauer and Hans Holbein the Elder, who studied in the school of van der Weyden. His altarpiece at Rothenburg contains groups and figures, as well as forms of action and drapery, which seem copied from those of van der Weyden's or Memlinc's disciples, and the votive Madonna of 1488, whilst characterized by similar features, only displays such further changes as may be accounted for by the master's constant later contact with contemporaries in Swabia.

Herlen had none of the genius of Schöngauer. He failed to acquire the delicacy even of the second-rate men who handed down to Matsys the traditions of the 15th century; but his example was certainly favourable to the development of art in Swabia. By general consent critics have assigned to him a large altar-piece, with scenes from the gospels and figures of St Florian and St Floriana, and a Crucifixion, the principal figure of which is carved in high relief on the surface of a large panel in the church of Dinkelsbuhl.

A Crucifixion, with eight scenes from the New Testament, is shown as his in the cathedral, a Christ in Judgment, with Mary and John, and the Resurrection of Souls in the town-hall of Nördlingen. A small Epiphany, once in the convent of the Minorites of Ulm, is in the Holzschuher collection at Augsburg, a Madonna and Circumcision in the National Museum at Munich. Herlen's epitaph, preserved by Rathgeber, states that he died on October 12, 1491, and was buried at Nördlingen.
