= John Cor =

15th-century Scottish friar

John Cor or John Carr (fl. 1495) was a fifteenth-century Scottish mendicant friar. He is significant partly because of his connection to the earliest written record of Scotch whisky.

In a Latin entry in the Exchequer Rolls John Cor is addressed by King James IV of Scotland, with the order to use "eight bolls of malt (brasium) to make whisky (aquavitae)." Historian Janet Foggie has called this the "first mention of whisky in a Scottish source". The reference to Cor and Scotch Whisky occurs on 1 June 1495. Another historian, Mairi Cowan, referred to it as "the first written record of the distillation of whisky".

John Cor has been identified as a member of the Order of Preachers, a Dominican. Although John's specific friary is unclear from the source itself, the twentieth-century archivist and medievalist scholar Anthony Ross claimed that it could be identified as the Blackfriars house at Edinburgh based on references in the Protocol Book of Peter Marche.

He may be the same as the 'Friar Cor' (frere Cor), gifted 14 shillings on Christmas Day at Linlithgow Palace in 1488 by King James IV, and then at Christmas time in 1494 given black cloth from Rijsel (i.e. Lille) in Flanders for his livery clothes as a clerk in royal service.
