= Ali al-Jabarti =

15th-century Somali scholar and politician

- Title: al-Jabarti

Personal life
- Died: 1492
- Era: 15th century
- Region: Horn of Africa/North Africa
- Main interest(s): Islamic philosophy, politics

Religious life
- Religion: Islam

Ali al-Jabarti (Arabic: علي الجبرتي) (d. 1492) was a 15th-century Somali scholar and politician in the Mamluk Empire.
