= Agostino Gallo =

Italian agronomist

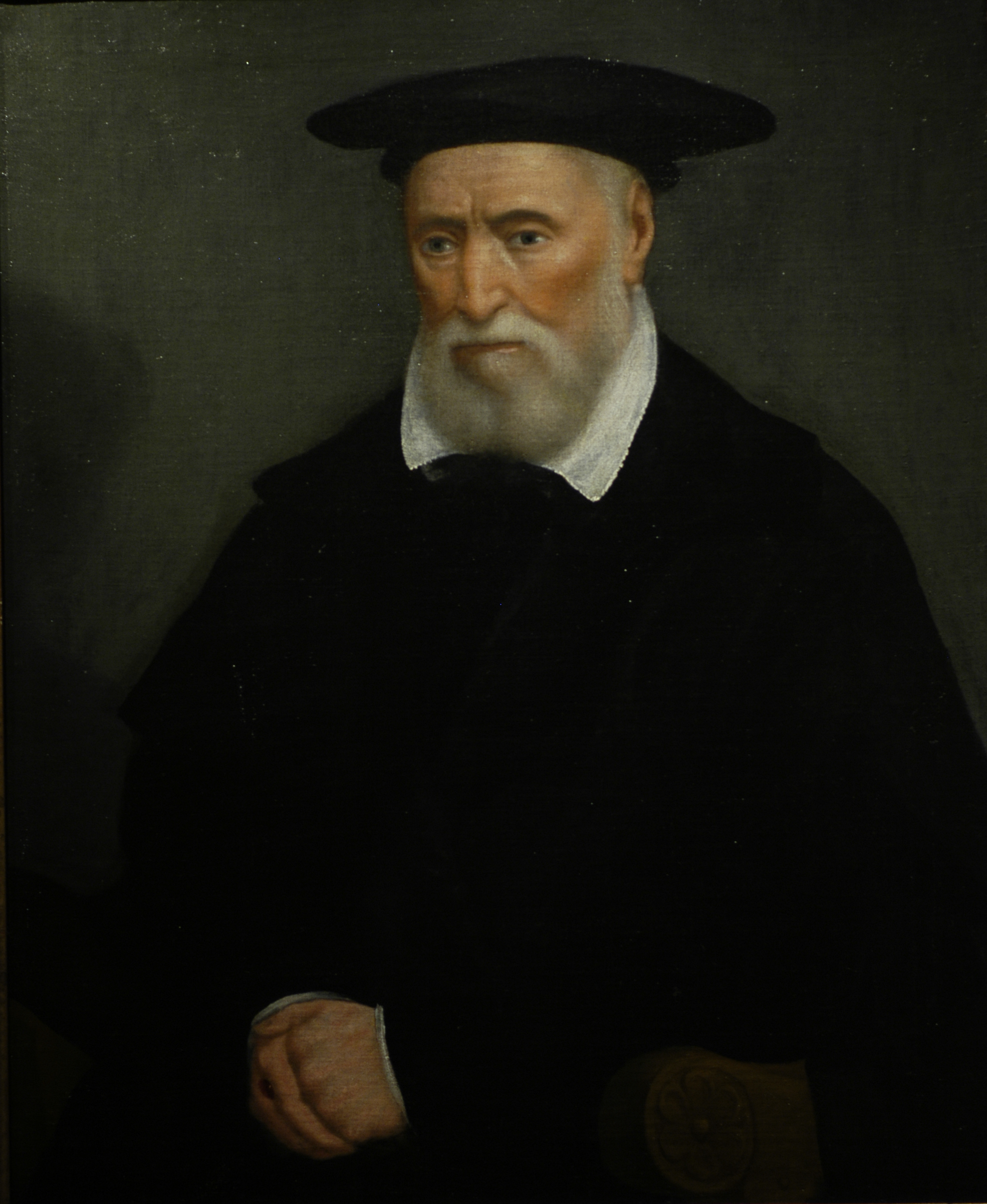
Agostino Gallo

Agostino Gallo (1499 – c. 1570) was an Italian agronomist.

Although not a man of letters, Agostino Gallo contributed greatly to the store of written agricultural knowledge of his time. He improved methods of cultivating Italian land by studying classical and modern techniques, as well as introducing new crops, such as alfalfa and rice. For these reasons, he is considered the father or restorer of Italian agriculture.

== Selected works ==
- Gallo, Agostino (1565). Le dieci giornate della vera agricoltura, e piaceri della villa (in Italian). Published between 1550 and 1569 in several languages.

== General references ==
- Antonio Saltini, Storia delle scienze agrarie, t.I, Dalle origini al Rinascimento, Edagricole, Bologne, 1984, pp. 258–361.
