= Giovanni Battista da Sangallo =

Italian architect

Giovanni Battista da Sangallo (1496–1548) was an Italian architect. He was the brother of the more famous Antonio da Sangallo the Younger.

His is intimately connected with that of Antonio: the two worked on numerous projects together, Giovanni Battista responsible for measuring and surveying. All but a single project of Giovanni Battista's own architecture have been demolished or rebuilt. A codex of highly detailed, carefully measured drawings of sixteen ancient buildings in Rome and the temples of Hercules and Castor and Pollux at nearby Cori made by Giovanni Battista, the "Codex Stosch", named for an eighteenth-century owner, baron Philipp von Stosch, surfaced and was bought for the Royal Institute of British Architects' Library, London. It consistently presents designs of buildings in a manner that would become standard: plan, elevation and section, all drawn to the same scale so that each mode of presentation serves to illuminate the others, a technique first worked out in the immediate circle of Raphael in the first decades of the sixteenth century.
