= Ambrosius Moibanus =

German Lutheran theologian

Ambrosius Moibanus (4 April 1494 – 16 January 1554) was a German Lutheran theologian and reformer, and first Lutheran pastor at St Elisabeth's church in Breslau (now Wrocław).

He was active in Silesia. He was an opponent of the Anabaptists, and pressed for their persecution.

He was also a proponent of the education of women.
