= Martín Ocelotl =

16th century Aztec priest

Martín Ocelotl (1496 – 1537?) was an Aztec indigenous priest (shaman) who was put on trial during New Spain’s Inquisition. He was ultimately banished to Spain.

== Biography ==
=== Early life ===
Ocelotl was born into a powerful family from the town of Chinanta (Chinantl) located in Puebla, Mexico. His last name Ocelotl, means jaguar in Nahuatl. His father was a successful merchant who was part of the pochteca, while his mother was a well known and effective priestess. It is also believed that Ocelotl came from a powerful family and was considered to be a religious prodigy at young age.

=== Religious Practice ===
Ocelotl operated in a Nahua framework as a tlaziuhque and ticiti (healer), and some accounts recall that he mainly worked at temples before Spanish conquest. Other sources mention that his mother was also involved in transformative rituals.

His work was mainly associated with two types of spiritual figures, jaguars and rain deities. Ocelotl, which means jaguar in Nahuatl, held particular importance in the puebla. In Mesoamerican culture, jaguars held power over water and were commonly seen in depictions of other gods, such as the rain god Tlaloc. Most of Ocelotl's prediction and gifts to nobles were in the name of Camastecle, a deity of the rain gods. Ocelotl is recorded telling visitors to leave his house because of the approach of rain clouds, which he referred to as "my sisters."

=== Conversion ===
After the downfall of the Aztec Empire, Ocelotl took up residence in the nearby and former alliance state of Tetzcoco (Texcoco). It was there that Martín was able to continue his practice of being a successful shaman, referred to as a tlaziuhque, in the town. He also tried to establish a religious school in which many of the indigenous could be able to continue out their daily religious rituals. However, because the conquest had occurred many indigenous started to convert to Christianity in order to avoid the Inquisition.

At the age of twenty-nine in 1525, Ocelotl converted to the Roman Catholic faith and was baptized. He was given the Spanish name Martín. Although Martín was now baptized, he continued to practice the old ways. Rumors about Ocelotl's power spread and many of the priests feared his influence over the converted indigenous community. He was also very wealthy and was able to share with many members within his area. Eventually, he would be accused of using witchcraft and practicing idolatry.

=== Trial and banishment ===
In the fall of 1536, he was placed on trial before the Inquisition. According to several witnesses, they were able to recall how Martín Ocelotl used his power and was able to predict when rain was going to occur. Another witness brought up the fact he was the child of powerful sorcerers and claimed to be a more powerful witch. He was also accused of transforming into a tiger and a cat. Although there was plenty of evidence to find Martín Ocelotl guilty, he claimed that he was innocent because he believed that he had done nothing wrong.

His case was eventually given to the Bishop Juan de Zumárraga of New Spain (Mexico) who made the final decision on what would happen to Martín Ocelotl. On February 10, 1537, Martín Ocelotl was publicly humiliated in front of everyone and was accused of using witchcraft. Martín Ocelotl was also banished from his home and forced to live life imprisoned in Seville, Habsburg Spain under the watchful eye of the Spanish Inquisition.

Unfortunately, according to records the ship that carried Martín Ocelotl to Spain disappears. No one knows what happened to him after his departure.
