= Yi Gwang-sik =

Korean general (1493–1563)

Yi Gwang-sik (Korean: 이광식; Hanja: 李光軾; 29 September 1493 – 1 December 1563), was a Korean politician and general during the Joseon period. He was famed for his victories against the Japanese navy during the Eulmyowaebyeon (을묘왜변) war of 1555.

In 1543 he was given the title of Naval Commander (병마절도사) of Pyongan Province.
