= Johannes Scheubel =

German mathematician

Johannes Scheubel (18 August 1494 – 20 February 1570) was a German mathematician. His books include De Numeris et Diversis Rationibus (1545) and Algebrae Compendiosa (1551).
