= Piero Pacini da Pescia =

Italian publisher

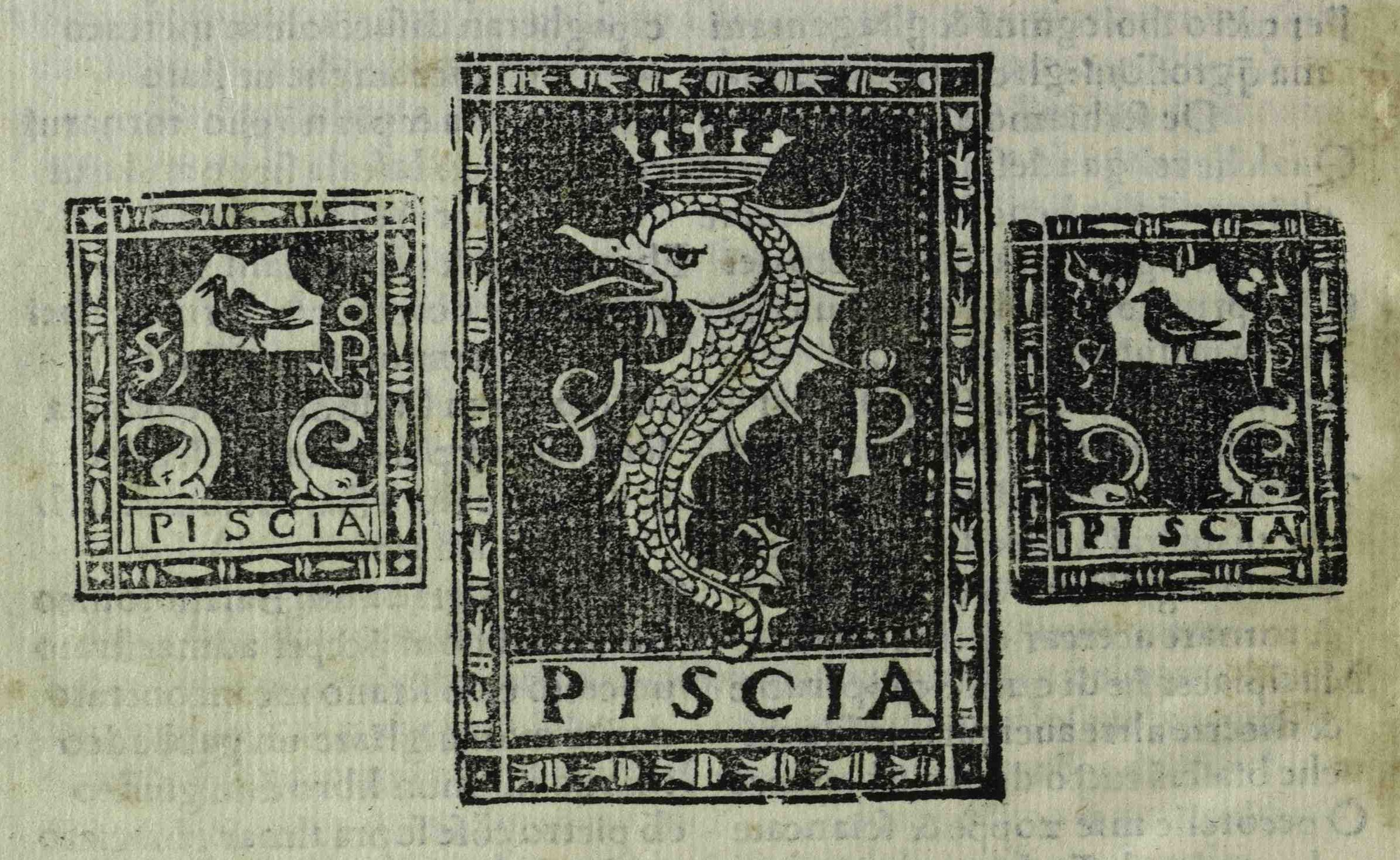
Pacini's mark (BEIC)

Piero Pacini da Pescia (1495–1514) was an Italian publisher. He lived and worked in Florence, Italy. Pacini made operettes. His publishing house was known for publishing quality woodcuts in their books. After his death, his son, Bernardo, continued the business. Works by Pacini are held in the collection of the Metropolitan Museum of Art and the Library of Congress.

His printer's mark can be found as a decoration on the Albert Kahn designed Muskegon Chronicle building in Muskegon, Michigan, USA. It was sculpted by Corrado Parducci.

== Notable works ==
- Epistole et Euangelii et Lectioni vulgari in lingua toschana, 1495
- Aesop's Fables, 1496
- Triumphs of Petrarch, 1499
- The Letters of Amerigo Vespucci, 1505
