= 1495 =

1495 in various calendars
- Gregorian calendar: 1495; MCDXCV
- Ab urbe condita: 2248
- Armenian calendar: 944; ԹՎ ՋԽԴ
- Assyrian calendar: 6245
- Balinese saka calendar: 1416–1417
- Bengali calendar: 901–902
- Berber calendar: 2445
- English Regnal year: 10 Hen. 7 – 11 Hen. 7
- Buddhist calendar: 2039
- Burmese calendar: 857
- Byzantine calendar: 7003–7004
- Chinese calendar: 甲寅年 (Wood Tiger); 4192 or 3985 — to — 乙卯年 (Wood Rabbit); 4193 or 3986
- Coptic calendar: 1211–1212
- Discordian calendar: 2661
- Ethiopian calendar: 1487–1488
- Hebrew calendar: 5255–5256
- Hindu calendars
- Vikram Samvat: 1551–1552
- Shaka Samvat: 1416–1417
- Kali Yuga: 4595–4596
- Holocene calendar: 11495
- Igbo calendar: 495–496
- Iranian calendar: 873–874
- Islamic calendar: 900–901
- Japanese calendar: Meiō 4 (明応４年)
- Javanese calendar: 1412–1413
- Julian calendar: 1495; MCDXCV
- Korean calendar: 3828
- Minguo calendar: 417 before ROC 民前417年
- Nanakshahi calendar: 27
- Thai solar calendar: 2037–2038
- Tibetan calendar: ཤིང་ཕོ་སྟག་ལོ་ (male Wood-Tiger); 1621 or 1240 or 468 — to — ཤིང་མོ་ཡོས་ལོ་ (female Wood-Hare); 1622 or 1241 or 469

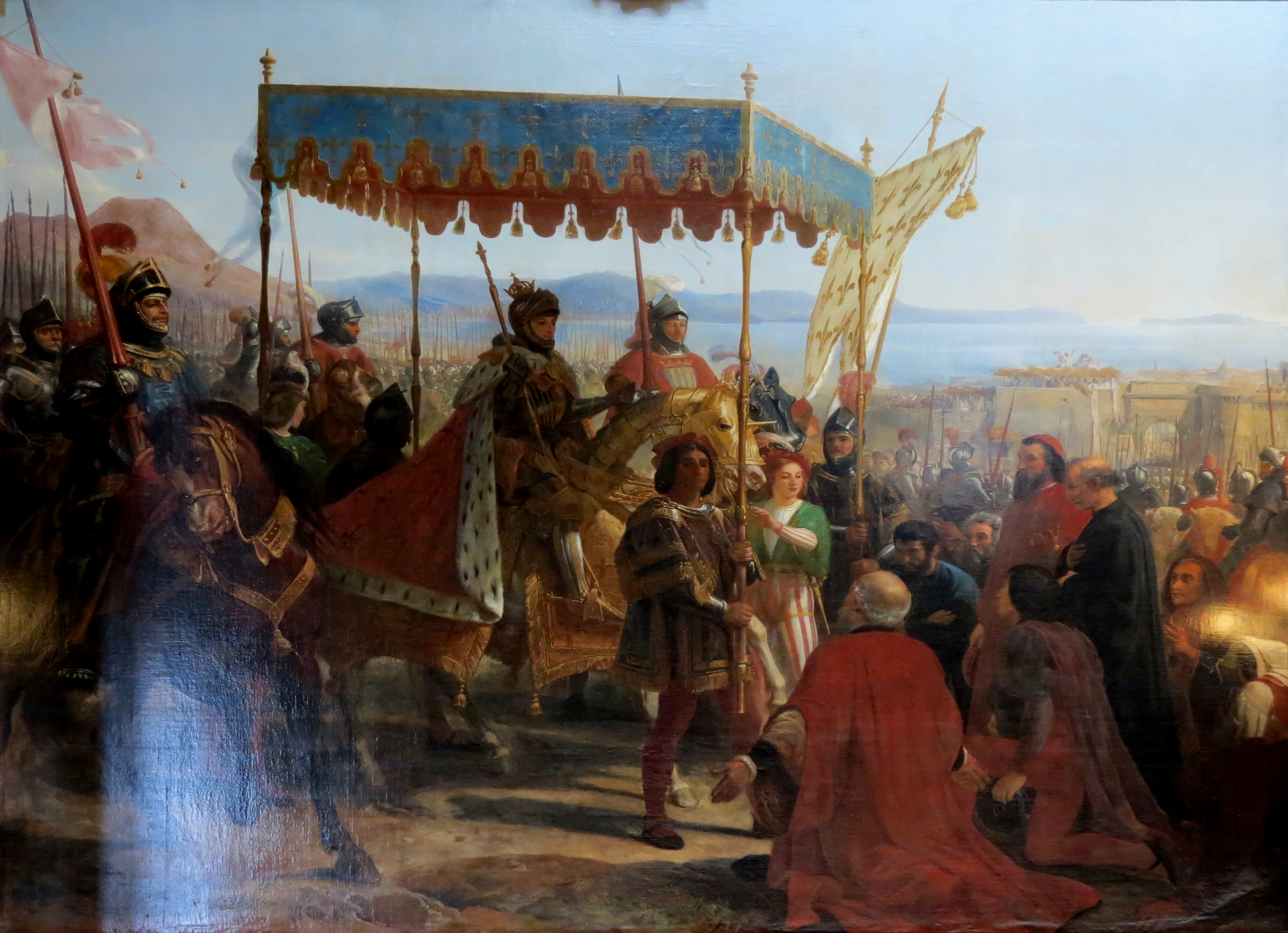
February 22, 1495: King Charles VIII of France enters the city of Naples and claims the throne.

Year 1495 (MCDXCV) was a common year starting on Thursday of the Julian calendar.

== Events ==
=== January–March ===
- January 20 – At Hanseong (now Seoul), Prince Yi Yung becomes the new ruler of Joseon, comprising most of the Korean Peninsula, now North Korea and South Korea. Taking the regnal name Yeongsangun, he succeeds his father, King Seongjong, who had ruled more than 25 years. Known for his cruelty, Yeonsangun will be overthrown after more than 11 years in 1506 and exiled to Ganghwa Island.
- January 23 – King Alfonso II of Naples abdicates after almost a year on the throne as the army of King Charles VIII of France approaches the Neapolitan border. Alfonso's son becomes the new monarch as King Ferdinand II.
- January 28 – Prince Cem Sultan, brother of the Ottoman Sultan Bayezid II, imprisoned since 1482 after being captured by the Knights Hospitaller, and held captive in Rome since 1489, is released from to French custody by Pope Alexander VI at the request of King Charles of France.
- February 22 – Italian War of 1494–98: King Charles VIII of France enters the city of Naples, to claim the throne of the Kingdom of Naples. A few months later, he decides to return to France, and leaves Naples with most of his army, leaving a force under his cousin Gilbert, Count of Montpensier as viceroy. Syphilis is first definitely recorded in Europe during this invasion. (perhaps from French forces who may have contacted Croats fleeing an Ottoman army in the east).
- February 10 – King's College, Aberdeen, predecessor of the University of Aberdeen in Scotland, is founded with the issuance of the papal bull Primo Erectio Universitatis by Pope Alexander VI on the petition of William Elphinstone, Bishop of Aberdeen.

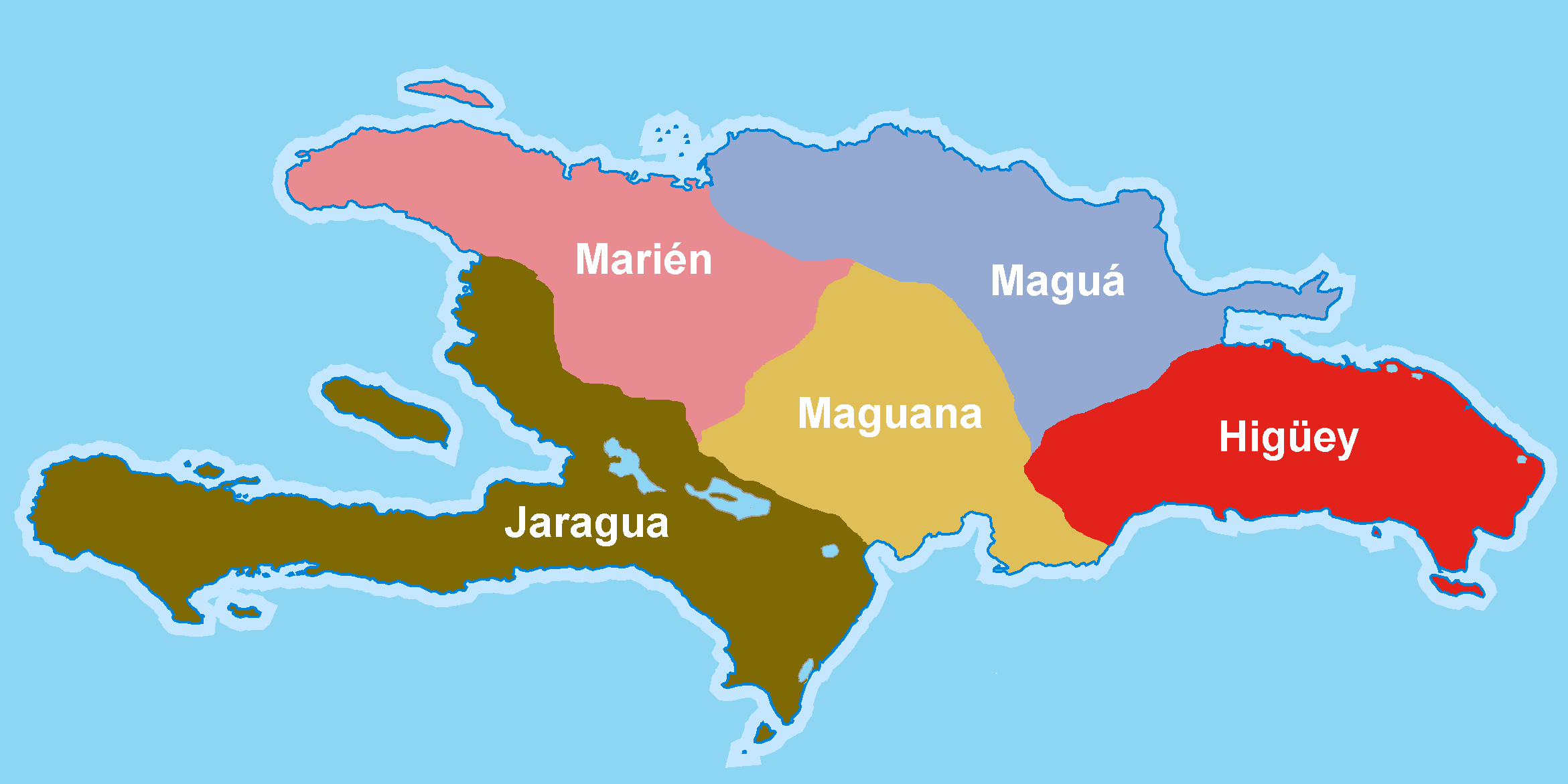
The five caciques of the Taino rulers of Hispaniola

- March 24 – The first military combat between the Old World and the New World takes place at the Battle of Vega Real. In his role as the Spanish Governor of Hispaniola, Christopher Columbus and his ally, the Taino Chief (cacique) Guacanagaríx of Marién and begin a war of retaliation against the cacique Caonabo of Maguana, who had led the 1493 massacre of the Spanish colonists at La Navidad.
- March 26 – The inaugural session of the Diet of Worms (Wormser Reichstag), a gathering of the electors and princes of the Holy Roman Empire to discuss reforms of the government, is opened at Worms, Germany, by Maximilian I, the acting Holy Roman Emperor.
- March 31 – In response to the French invasion and rapid subjugation of the Italian nations, the League of Venice is formed by representatives of Pope Alexander, King Ferdinand of Spain, the acting Holy Emperor Maximilian, and Ludovico, Duke of Milan.

=== April–June ===
- April 2 – (10th waxing of Vaishakha 857 ME The two-day coronation of King Binnya Ran II as ruler of the Hanthawaddy kingdom, in what is now southern Myanmar, begins at the Shwemawdaw Pagoda at the capital, Pegu (now Bago in Myanmar). Binnya Ran had succeeded to the throne in 1492 upon the death of his father, King Dhammazedi.
- May 2 – At the Battle of Rapallo, 11 ships of the Republic of Genoa Navy commanded by Francesco Spinola and Fabrizio Giustiniani, defeat a French 11-ship force led by Louis de Miolans, who is taken prisoner of war when he and his ships are all captured. Rapallo, captured by the French a year earlier, is retaken by Genoa and 300 women held hostage by the French are freed.
- May 26 – A Spanish army under Gonzalo Fernández de Córdoba lands in Calabria, with the purpose of ousting the French and restoring Ferdinand II of Naples to the throne.
- June 1 – Brother John Cor of Lindores Abbey pays duty on 8 bolls of malt to the Exchequer in Scotland to make aqua vitae for King James IV; the record in the Exchequer Rolls is the first written reference to Scotch whisky.
- June 11 – Louis, Duke of Orleans, at the time a French general, opens a new front in the Italian War as he and his troops are allowed to occupy the city of Novara in the Duchy of Milan.
- June 28 – Battle of Seminara: The deposed King Ferdinand II of Naples and the reigning Spanish King Ferdinand II of Aragon, with forces commanded by Gonzalo Fernandez, are defeated by a French army commanded by Bernard Stewart, Lord of Aubigny.
- June – Gribshunden, the flagship of King Hans Oldenburg of Denmark sinks off the coast of Ronneby in Sweden while King Hans is ashore to negotiate with Sten Sture the Elder to restore the power of the Kalmar Union. According to some accounts, the sinking (and the death of more than 150 crew) happened after an explosion and fire, though explorations of the shipwreck centuries later show no indication of burning.

=== July–September ===
- July 3 – At the Battle of Deal, Perkin Warbeck's troops land in Kent, in support of his claim to the English crown, backed by Margaret of York, Duchess of Burgundy. They are routed before Warbeck himself can disembark, and he retreats to Ireland and then to Scotland.
- July 6 – Winning the Battle of Fornovo, the French army under King Charles secures its retreat from Italy, by defeating a combined Milanese-Venetian force of the League of Venice, commanded by Francesco Gonzaga, Marquis of Mantua.
- July 7 – With Charles VIII forced to retreat from Naples, Ferdinand II returns to the throne as the Neapolitan King.
- July 19 – The League of Venice (with troops from Venice, Milan and Mantua) begins the two-month Siege of Novara in the Duchy of Milan to drive out the French occupiers led by the Duke of Orleans.
- July 23 – After failing at the Battle of Deal, Perkin Warbeck and his troops land with 11 ships at the Ireland port of Waterford to gain a foothold in his attempt to invade England. Warbeck is joined by an Irish noble, Maurice FitzGerald, Earl of Desmond, and begins an 11-day siege. The defenders of Waterford protect the walled city by damming the St. John's River to flood the marshes around Warbeck's soldiers, and fire the fortresses cannons at Warbeck's ships.
- August 3 – After the sinking of two of his ships, Perkin Warbeck ends this siege of Waterford and retreats from Ireland along with his remaining fleet and warriors.
- August 7 – The Diet of Worms is adjourned in the Holy Roman Empire after more than four months, with an agreement among the constituent states to enact the Ewiger Landfriede (Eternal Peace), outlawing feuds between the states and the Holy Roman Empire's family groups, and to resolve controversies in a new Imperial Court (Reichskammergericht) and the Aulic Council.
- September 15 – King Henry VII of England summons the English Parliament for the first time in more than three years, directing the members of the House of Commons and the House of Lords to assemble at Westminster on October 14.
- September 24 – The League of Venice, with troops commanded by Beatrice d'Este, Duchess of Milan and Ludovico Sforza, Duke of Milan, succeeeds after more than three months in liberating the Milanese city of Novara from French control, and forces Louis of Orleans to flee.

=== October–December ===
- October 24 – The fifth parliament of England's King Henry VII opens at Westminster.
- October 25 – Manuel, Duke of Beja and Visieu takes the throne of Portugal as King Manuel I, following the death of his cousin, King João II.
- November 30 – An explosion at Vyborg Castle deters the Russian forces, who have invaded Sweden through Karelia.
- December 22 – At the close of the 1495 Parliament, King Henry VII of England gives royal assent to numerous new laws, including the Treason Act 1495 (An Acte that noe person going with the Kinge to the Warres shalbe attaynt of treason); the Vagabonds and Beggars Act 1495 ("Vagabonds, idle and suspected persons shall be set in the stocks for three days and three nights and have none other sustenance but bread and water and then shall be put out of Town."); and the Suing in Forma Pauperis Act 1495 (allowing "such persons as are poor" to file suit without having to pay court costs).

=== Date unknown ===
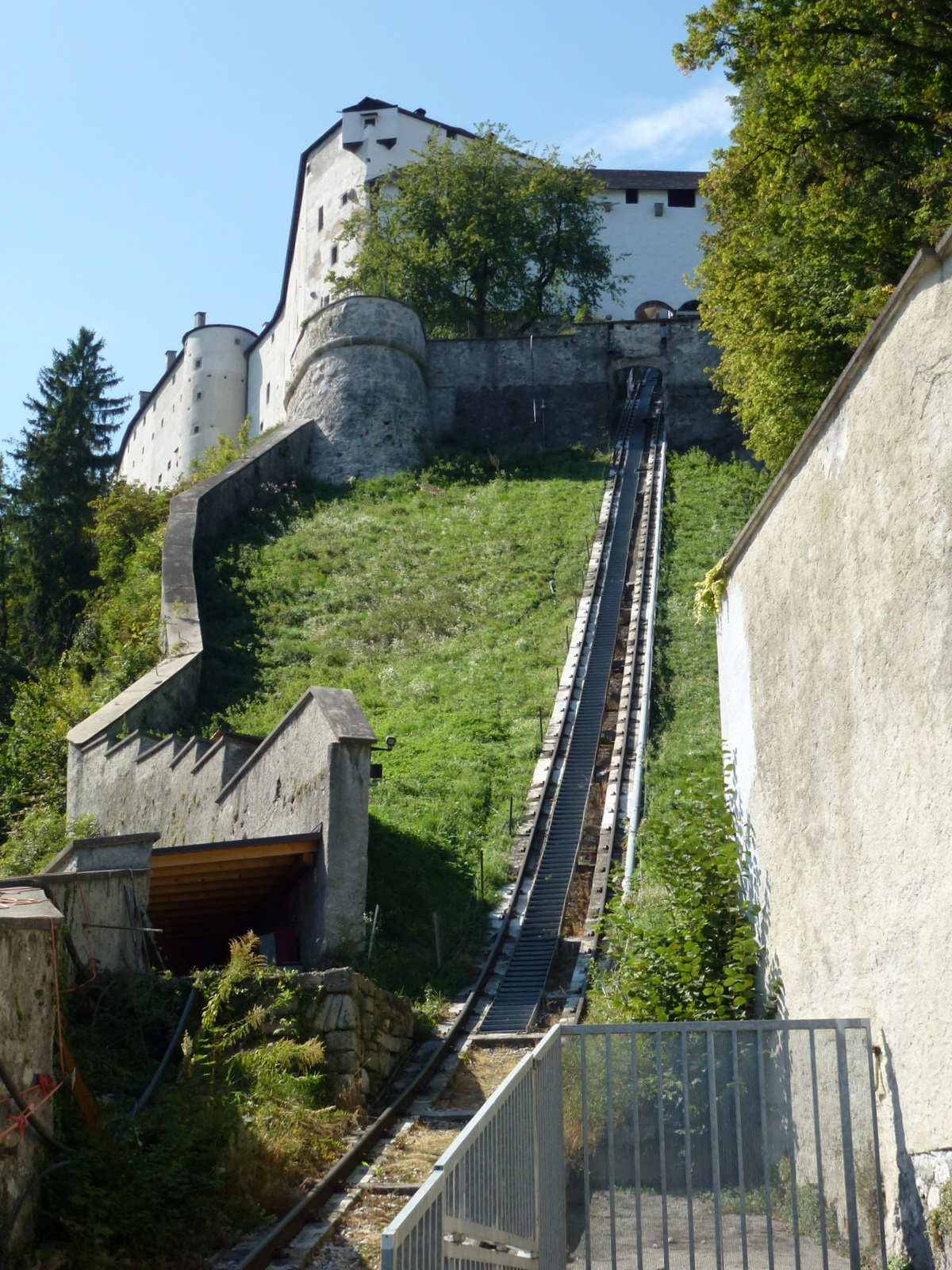
Reisszug, as it appeared in 2011

- The oldest extant cable railway, the Reisszug, is created by order of the Archbishop Leonhard von Keutschach shortly after his election on July 7, 1495. The railway is used for the manual pulling of a wheeled cart up an incline, to provide goods for the Hohensalzburg Fortress, at Salzburg in Austria.
- Poynings' Law comes into effect, placing the Parliament of Ireland under the authority of the Parliament of England.
- The Reichskammergericht of the Holy Roman Empire is founded in Frankfurt.
- Henry VII of England commissions the world's first dry dock, at Portsmouth.
- Piero Pacini da Pescia publishes Epistles, Gospels, and Popular Readings in the Tuscan Language

== Births ==
- January 26 – Emperor Go-Nara of Japan (d. 1557)
- February 4
  - Francesco II Sforza, Duke of Milan (d. 1535)
  - Jean Parisot de Valette, Grand Master of the Knights Hospitaller (d. 1568)
- February 13 – Giacomo Puteo, Spanish cardinal (d. 1563)
- March 6 – Luigi Alamanni, Italian poet and statesman (d. 1556)
- March 8 – John of God, Portuguese friar and saint (d. 1550)
- March 26 – Michele Antonio, Marquess of Saluzzo (d. 1528)
- March 29 – Leonhard Päminger, Austrian composer (d. 1567)
- April 16 – Petrus Apianus, German humanist (d. 1552)
- August 1 – Jan van Scorel, Dutch painter (d. 1562)
- August 24 – Otto I, Duke of Brunswick-Harburg, Prince of Lüneburg and Baron of Harburg (d. 1549)
- September 18 – Louis X, Duke of Bavaria, German noble (d. 1545)
- September 20 – Gian Matteo Giberti, Catholic bishop (d. 1543)
- September 23 – Bagrat III of Imereti, King of Imereti (d. 1565)
- September 24 – Barbara of Brandenburg-Ansbach-Kulmbach, Landgravine of Leuchtenberg (d. 1552)
- November 1 – Erhard Schnepf, German theologian (d. 1558)
- November 21 – John Bale, English churchman (d. 1563)
- December 5 – Nicolas Cleynaerts, Flemish grammarian (d. 1542)
- date unknown
  - Robert Barnes, English reformer and martyr (d. 1540)
  - Cuauhtémoc, 11th Tlatoani (emperor) of Tenochtitlan (modern Mexico City), 1520-1521 (d. 1525)
  - Thomas Wharton, 1st Baron Wharton (d. 1568)
- probable
  - Pedro de Alvarado, Spanish conquistador (d. 1541)
  - Marie Dentière, Genevan Protestant reformer and theologian (d. 1561)
  - Costanzo Festa, Italian composer (d. 1545)
  - Nicolas Gombert, Flemish composer (d. 1560)

== Deaths ==
- January 11 – Pedro González de Mendoza, Spanish cardinal and statesman (b. 1428)
- January 21 – Magdalena of France, French princess and regent of Navarre (b. 1443)
- February 25 – Sultan Cem, pretender to the Ottoman throne (b. 1459)
- May 31 – Cecily Neville, English duchess, mother of Kings Edward IV and Richard III of England (b. 1415)
- September – Vlad Călugărul, Wallachian half-brother of Vlad the Impaler
- September 14 – Elizabeth Tudor, English princess, daughter of Henry VII of England (b. 1492)
- October 25 – King John II of Portugal (b. 1455)
- October 30 – Francis, Count of Vendome (b. 1470)
- December 16 – Charles Orlando, Dauphin of France, French noble (b. 1492)
- December 18 – King Alfonso II of Naples (b. 1448)
- December 21 – Jasper Tudor, 1st Duke of Bedford (b. c. 1431)
