= Battle of Seminara =

Battle in the Italian Wars (1495)

Coordinates: 38.3333°N 15.8667°E

- Part of the First Italian War
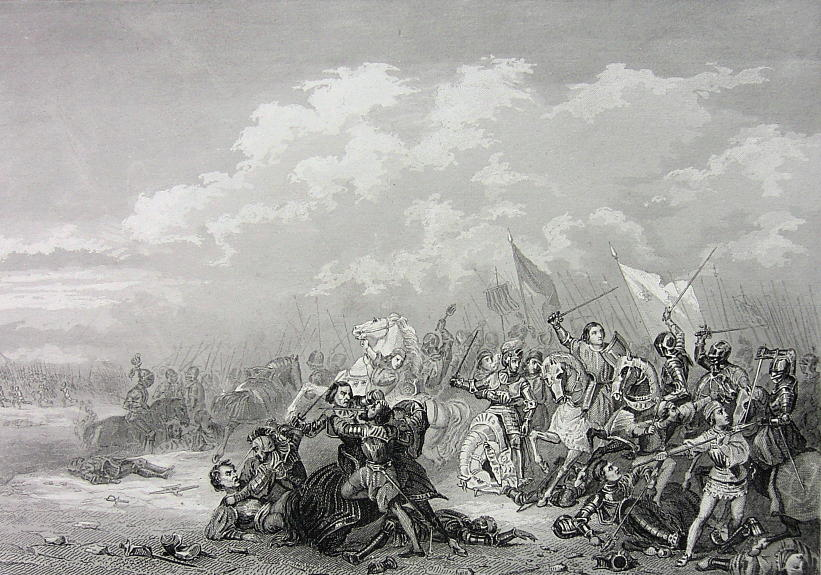
- Ferdinand II of Naples in peril at the height of the battle, only to be saved by a nobleman. Illustration by an unknown 19th century artist.
Date	28 June 1495
Location	Seminara, Kingdom of Naples
Result	French victory

Belligerents
France	Spain; Kingdom of Naples

Commanders and leaders
(Kingdom of France) Bernard d'Aubigny	(Kingdom of Naples) Ferdinand II of Naples Gonzalo de Cordoba

The Battle of Seminara, part of the First Italian War, was fought in Calabria on 28 June 1495 between a French garrison in recently conquered Southern Italy and the allied forces of Spain and Naples which were attempting to reconquer these territories. Against the redoubtable combination of gendarmes and Swiss mercenary pikemen in the French force, the allies had only Neapolitan troops of indifferent quality and a small corps of lightly armed Spanish soldiers, accustomed to fighting the Moors of Spain. The result was a rout, and much of the fighting centered on delaying actions to permit the fleeing allied force to escape.

The battle is notable primarily because it is often cited as the prime reason for the reorganization of the Spanish army, which brought about widespread adoption of firearms in pike and shot formations, one of the milestones of the "Military Revolution."

== Antecedents ==
French king Charles VIII had invaded Italy in 1494 in an attempt to press his Angevin claim to the throne of the Kingdom of Naples upon the death of Ferdinand I of Naples. Ferdinand's successor was his son Alfonso II of Naples, who soon abdicated—in fear of the looming French invasion—in favor of his son, Ferdinand II of Naples.

The French quickly overran the disunited Italian peninsula and arrived in the Kingdom of Naples on 21 February 1495, Ferdinand II having fled to Sicily at the approach of the French army. There, in temporary exile, Ferdinand joined his cousin, Ferdinand II of Aragon, King of Sicily and Spain, who offered assistance in recovering Naples.

In response to Charles' invasion, the League of Venice was formed by many of the Italian powers opposed to the French presence in Italy. The League subsequently established a strong military force in the north of Italy, which threatened to cut the line of communication between the French army, then deep in the south of Italy, and its base in France. On 30 May 1495 Charles split his army, taking half of the troops (approximately 9,000 men, horse and foot) in the northward march to fight their way back into France, and leaving the rest to hold the recently conquered Neapolitan territories. Eventually, after hard fighting, Charles' army forced its way past a larger League force at the Battle of Fornovo (July 1495) and returned to France.

== Campaign ==
The theatre of operations showing troop movements leading up to the Battle of Seminara.

Meanwhile, Ferdinand II of Naples was determined to rid the Kingdom of Naples of the garrison left behind by the French king. Although scattered throughout the area, the French garrison was composed of three basic elements:

- The main force in Naples, led by the brave but indolent and inexperienced aristocrat Gilbert d'Montpensier,
- A force to the south in Calabria under the command of the able captain of the King’s Scottish Archers, Bernard Stewart, Lord of Aubigny, whom Charles had appointed “Grand Constable of Naples”, and
- The Swiss mercenaries (along with some other forces) stationed in Basilicata under the command of the French nobleman Précy.

To oppose these forces Ferdinand had his own army, and aid from his Spanish cousin. The Spanish general Gonzalo Fernández de Córdoba was dispatched from Spain with a small army, largely as a vanguard (more troops were being raised in Spain and would follow on later), and to show support for Ferdinand II of Naples’ reconquest effort. Fernández De Córdoba had been selected by Queen Isabella to lead the Spanish contingent because he was a favorite of the court as well as a soldier of considerable renown, despite his relative youth. Fernández De Córdoba arrived in the port at Messina on 24 May 1495, only to find that Ferdinand II of Naples had already crossed into Calabria with an army, borne upon the fleet of Admiral Requesens, and had reoccupied Reggio.

Fernández De Córdoba himself crossed over to Calabria two days later. He had under his command 600 lances of Spanish cavalry, many of these light jinetes, and 1,500 infantry, many of them rodeleros (armed with swords and shields), to which were added 3,500 soldiers from the Spanish fleet. The size of the Neapolitan army is unclear, but soon was supplemented by 6,000 volunteers from Calabria, who joined the Neapolitan ranks when Ferdinand II landed. Fernández De Córdoba’s Spanish contingent was further depleted because he needed to put Spanish garrisons in several fortified places which Ferdinand II of Naples turned over to Spain in partial compensation for the military aid Spain was providing.

The allied army marched from Reggio to Sant'Agata del Bianco, and from there to Seminara, a fortified place approximately 28 miles (40 kilometers) from Reggio. Both towns opened their gates to Ferdinand II. En route a detachment of French troops was encountered and destroyed by the allied force. The League of Venice assisted the allies by sending a Venetian fleet under Admiral Antonio Grimani to raid along the eastern coast of French-occupied Naples. In one instance, at Monopoli, Grimani destroyed the French garrison stationed there.

Although he was seriously ill with malaria which he had recently contracted, the French commander in Calabria, the Scotsman d’Aubigny, lost no time in responding to the allied challenge, quickly consolidating his forces to confront the Neapolitan/Spanish invasion by calling in isolated garrisons throughout Calabria and requesting that Précy reinforce him with the Swiss mercenaries. D’Aubigny soon succeeded in concentrating his forces, and immediately marched on Seminara.

== Battle ==
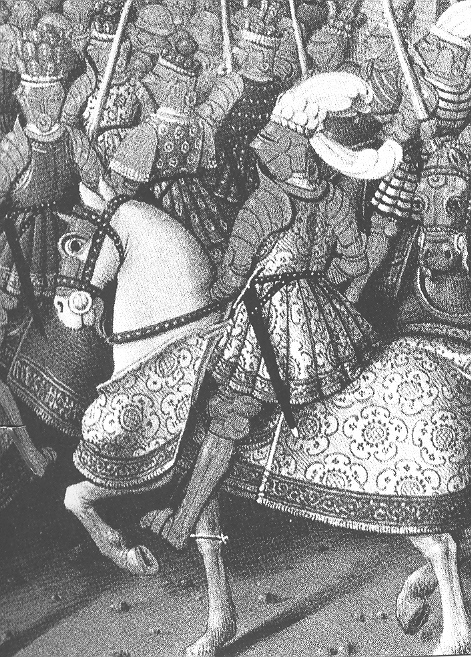
French gendarme armoured cavalry triumphed at Seminara because the Neapolitans and Spanish played their game – close combat in the open.

Upon hearing the news that d’Aubigny was approaching, but unaware that Précy and the Swiss mercenaries had joined him, Ferdinand II of Naples decided to meet the French in battle immediately, a decision shared by the Spanish and Neapolitan nobility. Fernández De Córdoba urged caution, or at least a full reconnaissance of the French force before risking battle, but was overruled.

Ferdinand led the allied army out of Seminara on 28 June and crossed over a line of hills approximately 3 miles east of town. There, on the plains below, just beyond a stream at the foot of these hills, was the French army, marching directly toward the Neapolitans. Ferdinand took a position behind the stream, deploying his infantry on the left and his cavalry on the right. D’Aubigny, ill but still mounted for command, deployed his cavalry—400 heavily armoured gendarme lancers and 800 lighter horsemen—facing the allied cavalry on the French left, the young nobleman Précy having given up command of the Swiss mercenaries in order to assist the ailing d'Aubigny in command of the horse. To their right were the 800 Swiss pikemen, and behind them the lesser French foot. Unlike most battles in which the Swiss deployed very deep, at Seminara they arrayed themselves in only three ranks, their 18-foot pikes bristling in the front of their formation. Thus deployed into line of battle, the French force attacked without hesitation, plunging into the stream.

Initially the engagement went well for the allies, the jinetes harrying the wading gendarmes by throwing javelins and breaking off, as was their method in Spain against the Moors. However, at this point the Calabrian militia panicked—possibly misconstruing the withdrawal of the jinetes as a rout, possibly fleeing the oncoming Swiss pike force—and fell back, exposing the left flank of the allied army. Although Ferdinand attempted to rally them, the retreating Calabrians were set upon and ridden down by gendarmes who had now crossed the stream.

The situation soon turned desperate for the allies, the Swiss rolling over the remaining Spanish rodeleros and the French gendarmes besting the allied cavalry. Ferdinand, easily recognized in his splendid garb, came under heavy attack, was unhorsed and threatened by enemy troops, only to be given the horse of a nobleman, alternately named as Giovanni di Capua or Juan de Altavista, who then gave his life delaying the enemy so that Ferdinand might escape. Fernández De Córdoba led the Spanish cavalry and the remaining infantry in a desperate delaying action against the French, which, together with the illness of the French leader, allowed the fleeing Neapolitans to escape. Fernandez fled back to Messina by boat that same day. Gonsalvo retreated to Calabria to re-equip his infantry with pikes and build a force of heavy cavalry.

== Consequences ==
Despite this great triumph of French arms on the field of battle, the overall situation of the isolated French garrison in southern Italy had not substantially changed. Using a small amphibious force and the loyalty of the local populace, Ferdinand II of Naples was soon thereafter able to retake Naples itself by ruse. Fernández De Córdoba, using what amounted to guerrilla tactics, and carefully avoiding any direct encounter with the dreaded Swiss battalions or massed gendarmes, slowly retook the rest of Calabria. Eventually, many of the mercenaries serving the French mutinied due to lack of pay and marched home, and the remaining French forces were eventually bottled up at Atella by the reunited forces of Ferdinand and Fernández De Córdoba, and forced to surrender in the subsequent siege.

Fernández De Córdoba's disastrous encounter at Seminara with the melee-proficient French/Swiss force led eventually to his introduction of the mixed pike and shot army (the tercios born). After this humiliating defeat, Fernández De Córdoba himself won every battle he fought, earning the title El Gran Capitán ("the Great Captain") and the assessment of several modern historians as the greatest captain of the Italian Wars.

== Sources ==
- Cowley, Robert; Parker, Geoffrey, eds. (1996). The Reader's Companion to Military History. Houghton Mifflin.
- Johnson, A. H. (1905). Europe in the Sixteenth Century, 1494–1598 (Period IV). Rivingtons.
- Keegan, John; Wheatcroft, Andrew (1996). Who's Who in Military History: From 1453 to the Present Day. Routledge.
- Mallett, Michael; Shaw, Christine (2012). The Italian Wars, 1494–1559. Pearson Education Limited.
- Nicolle, David (1996). Fornovo 1495 – France's Bloody Fighting Retreat. Osprey Publishing.
- Oman, Charles (1937). A History of the Art of War in the Sixteenth Century. Methuen & Co.
- Pohl, John (2001). The Conquistador, 1492–1550. Osprey Publishing.
- Roscoe, William. The Life and Pontificate of Leo the Tenth. Volume I. London: David Bogue, Fleet Street, 1846.
- Stewart, Paul (1975). "The Santa Hermandad and the First Italian Campaign of Gonzalo de Cordoba". Renaissance Quarterly. 28. Cambridge University Press: 29–37. doi:10.2307/2860420. JSTOR 2860420.
- Taylor, Frederick Lewis. The Art of War in Italy, 1494–1529. 1921.
