= Invasion of Italy =

Invasion of Italy may refer to:

- Hannibal's invasion of Italy lasting from 218 to 201 BC
- The Lombard invasion of Italy from 568 AD
- The French invasion of Italy as part of the Italian War of 1494–1495
- The Napoleonic invasion of Italy from 1792 to 1801
- The Allied invasion of Italy, 3–17 September 1943
- The German invasion of Italy, Operation Achse, 8–19 September 1943
