= Siege of Novara (1495) =

1495 Unsuccessful French battle of the Italian Wars

- Part of the First Italian War
Date	11 June – 24 September 1495
Location	Novara, Duchy of Milan
Result	League of Venice victory

Belligerents
France	League of Venice: Republic of Venice; Duchy of Milan; Margraviate of Mantua

Commanders and leaders
(Kingdom of France) Louis, Duke of Orléans	Galeazzo Sanseverino, Ludovico Sforza and Beatrice d'Este; Bernardo Contarini, Luca Pisani and Melchiorre Trevisan Francesco II Gonzaga of Mantua

Casualties and losses
2,000	

The siege of Novara took place in the summer and autumn of 1495 during the Italian War of 1494–1495. While king Charles VIII of France was retreating to the north after facing rebellions in the recently conquered Kingdom of Naples, and managed to escape the destruction of his army at the Battle of Fornovo (6 July 1495), his cousin Louis d'Orleans opened a second front by attacking the Duchy of Milan (which had defected to France's enemies) and occupying the city of Novara. In an effort to retrieve it, the Milanese army and their League of Venice allies besieged Novara for three months and fourteen days. Suffering from severe starvation and disease, the French lost about 2000 soldiers before Louis had to surrender and withdraw.

== Premise ==
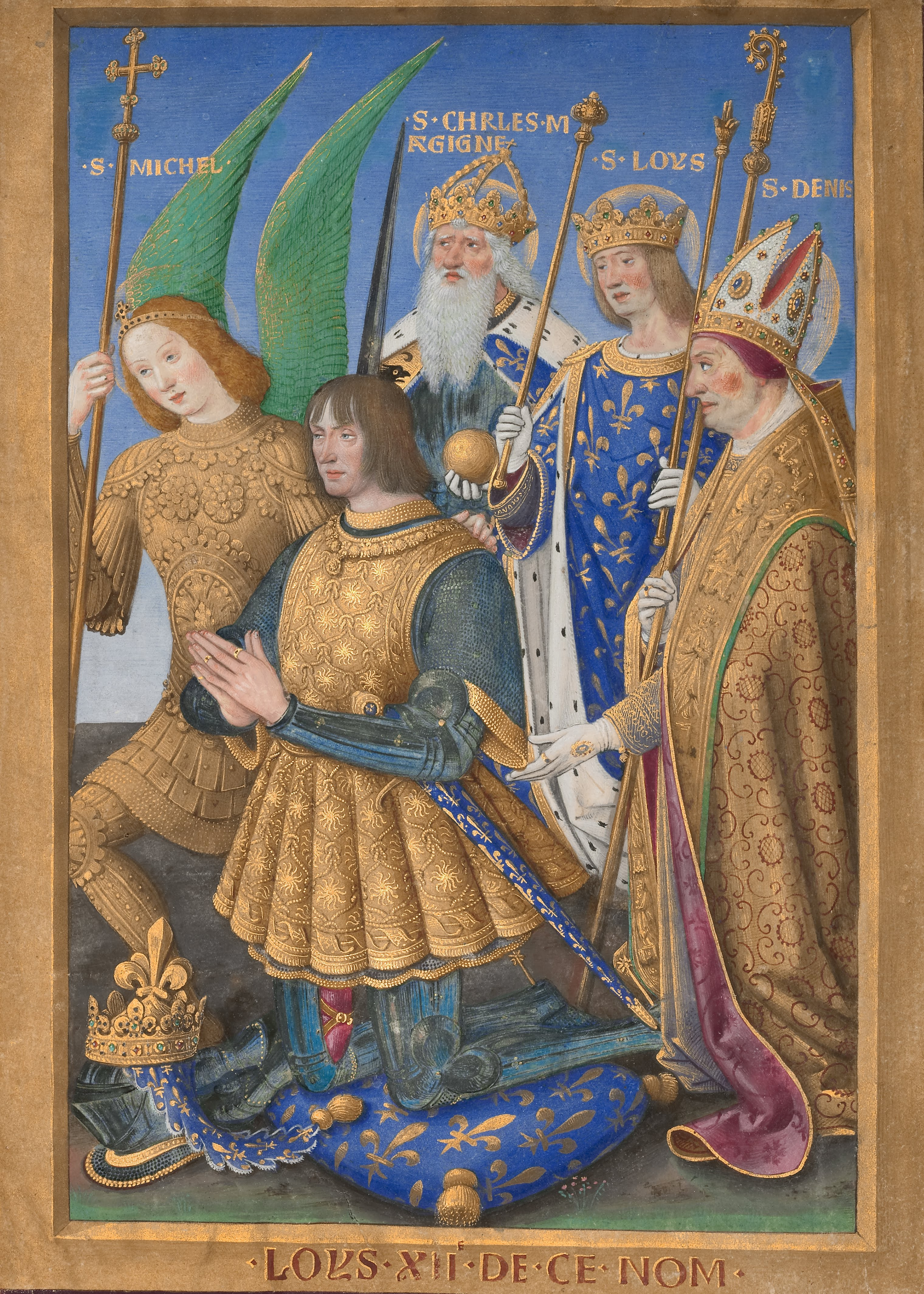
Louis d'Orleans at the age of 36 (1498)

In the early phase of the French invasion of Italy in September 1494, the French king Charles VIII and his cousin Louis d'Orléans had concluded an alliance with Ludovico "il Moro" Sforza, the Duke of Milan, against their common enemy Alfonso II of Naples. Alfonso claimed the Milanese dukedom, while Charles claimed the Neapolitan kingship, and so collaboration between the two seemed opportune. On the other hand, the French kings also had pretensions about the Duchy of Milan, which Louis in particular was keen on enforcing when given the chance.

Louis d'Orléans had not followed Charles on his march to Naples but had remained in his own fief of Asti, having fallen ill with malaria in September 1494. While the Franco-Milanese advance towards Naples went swiftly, accomplished on 22 February 1495, Charles' harsh policy of violent reprisals against any resistance resulted in death and destruction across cities and countries along the peninsula, to the horror of the Italian population and courts. This not only alienated the Milanese from the French but also spurred neutral states into active opposition towards the invaders. On 30 March 1495, the Italian states of Venice, Milan, Florence, Naples, Genoa, Mantua and the Papal States, as well as Spain and the Holy Roman Empire, concluded the League of Venice to drive the French out of Italy.

With the Milanese defection to the enemy camp, Louis saw his opportunity. He now threatened to implement his plan to conquer the Duchy of Milan, which he considered his right, being a descendant of Valentina Visconti.

== Conflict ==
=== French advance stopped ===
On 11 June 1495, Louis with his troops occupied the Milanese city of Novara, which was given to him by treason, and went as far as Vigevano. Ludovico il Moro then took refuge with his family in the Rocca del Castello in Milan but, not feeling equally safe, he meditated on abandoning the duchy to take refuge in Spain.

=== Siege of Novara ===
Francesco II Gonzaga, Marquess of Mantua, who had played an important role during the Battle of Fornovo (one which was arguably exaggerated later), moved his troops to Casallogiano on 19 July 1495, and began to besiege Novara. On 23 July, the Venetian government nominated Francesco captain-general of their forces and awarded him an annual salary of 2000 ducats, later handing him the baton and standard of his new rank.

The besieging troops from the League of Venice – mostly Milanese and Venetians – lacked artillery to bombard Novara, and Ludovico also preferred not to destroy one of his own cities. According to other sources, the attackers did employ field guns against Novara, but had to use earth, fascines, trenches and gabions to protect their artillery from the French cannons firing at them from the city. Instead, the allies resorted to starving the French out. They cut off Novara's water supplies by diverting the river, burnt the land around the city, and closely surrounded the city day and night to make leaving or entering Novara and provisioning it impossible. As Louis had fled inside Novara in such a panic, he had also failed to provision his army properly beforehand to be able to withstand a siege. The little grain they did have could not be ground to flour to bake bread without flowing water to power the town's mills. A supply convoy sent by Charles from Asti was easily captured by the besiegers. Moreover, the League spread false rumours into the city that Charles VIII had fallen in the Battle of Fornovo, or that he was too busy trying to seduce local princess Anna Solarno to relieve the French soldiers inside Novara, demoralising the defenders.

The city was plagued by famine and epidemics that decimated the French army. A French chronicler wrote: 'Every day some were starved to death.' To save as many supplies for his soldiers as possible, Louis decided to seize all the food of the civilians, and 'drove out all those of the populace who were poor and useless ['paupertatem omnem ac inutilem plebem exclusit']. A great many suffered from fever and diarrhoea due to the poor quality of the food and drinking of water.' According to the Mantuan ambassador in Milan, the civilians who were thrown out of Novara, mostly women and children, 'became prey to the stradiots in Venetian pay and were reduced to begging in the camp of the besiegers.' The Duke of Orleans, also ill with malarial fevers, urged his men to resist with the false promise that the king's help would soon come. However, the 20,000 Swiss mercenaries who Charles had hired as reinforcements would not arrive until after Louis had been forced to evacuate the city and give it back to the Milanese.

=== Peace negotiations ===
The critical conditions of the French military inside the city forced them to propose a truce to the Milanese on 21 September. Charles invited Francesco to visit him at Vercelli to negotiate an armistice; Francesco quested and obtained permission from the Venetian authorities to commence talks on their behalf, but their instructions were ambiguous. Louis was finally forced to cede the city on 24 September 1495 at the behest of King Charles, who was returning to France, and the enterprise ended in nothing.

About 2000 French soldiers had succumbed to disease or starvation by the time Novara was liberated, and the sight of the survivors shocked a French ambassador: "...so lean and meagre that they looked more like dead than living people; and truly, I believe never men endured more misery." Hundreds more died after they evacuated Novara, being left on the side of the roads as Louis withdrew his beaten forces. Louis was nevertheless burning with desire for revenge, and to the horror of a French diplomat, he urged Charles to stop the negotiations, keep fighting and attack Milan as soon as the Swiss reinforcements had arrived. However, the peace negotiations between captain-general Francesco and king Charles appear to have been very amicable, publicly exchanging compliments, with Charles giving Francesco two beautiful horses as a gift on 6 October, to which Francesco gifted Charles two beautiful horses in return a few days later.

On 9 October 1495, Charles VIII and Ludovico Sforza concluded the Peace of Vercelli between France and Milan. The Venetians and Spanish claimed they were not properly consulted, and objected strongly to Sforza's and Francesco II Gonzaga, Marquess of Mantua's alleged unilateral diplomatic actions. The Venetians particularly objected to the following agreements:

- Ludovico Sforza had permitted the French to use the port of Genoa to resupply their garrisons in Naples.
- Francesco Gonzaga had consented to a prisoner exchange between Mathieu, Bastard of Bourbon (captured at Fornovo, died 19 August 1505) and Fregosino Fregoso (a Genoese who had fought for the League).

As a result, the Veneto-Milanese alliance rapidly deteriorated.

== Bibliography ==
- Anonimo ferrarese (1928). Diario ferrarese. Rerum italicarum scriptores, raccolta degli storici italiani dal Cinquecento al Millecinquecento, fasc. 1, vol. 24. Giuseppe Pardi.
- Bowd, Stephen D. (2018). Renaissance Mass Murder: Civilians and Soldiers During the Italian Wars. Oxford: Oxford University Press. p. 121. ISBN 9780192568793.
- Dina, Achille (1921). Isabella d'Aragona Duchessa di Milano e di Bari, 1471–1524. Milan: Tipografia San Giuseppe. p. 366.
- James, Carolyn (2020). A Renaissance Marriage: The Political and Personal Alliance of Isabella d'Este and Francesco Gonzaga, 1490–1519. Oxford: Oxford University Press. p. 224. ISBN 9780199681211.
- Kaufmann, J. E.; Kaufmann, H. W. (2019). Castle to Fortress: Medieval to Post-Modern Fortifications in the Lands of the Former Roman Empire. Pen and Sword. ISBN 9781526736888.
- King, Ross (2012). Leonardo and the Last Supper. London: A&C Black. p. 116. ISBN 9780747599470.
- Zambotti, Bernardino (1937). Diario ferrarese dall'anno 1476 sino al 1504. Rerum Italicarum scriptores ordinata da Ludovico Antonio Muratori. Bologna: Giuseppe Pardi.
