= Siege of Atella =

Final battle in the Italian Wars (1495)

- Part of the First Italian War
Date	June–July 1496
Location	Atella, Kingdom of Naples
Result	Victory of the League of Venice

Belligerents
League of Venice: Kingdom of Spain; Kingdom of Naples; Republic of Venice; Papal States	France

Commanders and leaders
Gonzalo de Cordoba (Kingdom of Naples) Ferdinand II of Naples (Republic of Venice) Francesco II Gonzaga (Papal States) Cesare Borgia	(Kingdom of France) Gilbert of Monpensier

Strength
1,900 Spanish; Unknown number of allies	5,000

Casualties and losses
600	3,100

The siege of Atella was the concluding battle of the First Italian War, where the French headquarters in Atella was besieged and eventually taken by the League of Venice. The League's forces were commanded by Castilian general Gonzalo Fernández de Córdoba, who received the nom de guerre El Gran Capitán ("The Great Captain") for his success in the siege.

== Background ==
Ferdinand II had managed to drive French general Gilbert, Count of Montpensier back to his base in Atella, exciting the Neapolitan troops by making up a promise of German reinforcements sent by Maximilian I. However, he decided not to try to take the place without the presence of Fernández de Córdoba, who at the time operated in Calabria. The Castilian considered eminent to secure their Calabrian rear guard before attempting a final attack on the French base, but he accepted to rendezvous with Ferdinand.

Córdoba left Calabria with a small force of 400 cavalry and 1000 infantry handpicked by him. He marched through land, but the renown gained with his success in guerrilla warfare against the French gave him pass led several French-aligned positions to surrender on the way. After being reinforced by another 500 men sent from Spain, he reached Atella seventeen days later. Awaiting for him were Ferdinand II, the Papal captain Cesare Borgia and the Venetian commander Francesco II Gonzaga, Marquis of Mantua, who agreed to hand command to Córdoba.

== Siege ==
Córdoba's first action was to evaluate the city's defenses with a cavalry troop. He found the city's weak spot in a series of mills that supplied the city with water and food, which he intended to capture. When Montpensier found out about his intentions, he guarded the mills with a force of Swiss pikemen and Gascon archers, against which Córdoba issued a mixed body of rodeleros protected by mounted jinetes, clashing on July 1.

The battle was not lengthy, as the French contingent, probably demoralized by their dire strategic situation, withdrew quickly to Atella in various degrees of order. The Spanish light cavalry cut their retreat in a pincer movement before they could reach the city, upon which the French were almost annihilated. The heavy French cavalry of gendarmes sallied out of the city in their help, leading Córdoba to call his cavalry back and regroup with his infantry, managing to hold off together the French counterattack. The French cavalry eventually routed and returned to Atella.

Córdoba initiated then a campaign to take the surrounding cities of Ripacandida and Venosa, which had remained in French control. With Atella virtually isolated, Montpensier decided to surrender the city if French reinforcements didn't arrive in 30 days. As this never happened, he finally surrendered in August. Montpensier would die of illness in the way back to France.

== Bibliography ==
- Hernández Ríos, P., 2005: “El Gran Capitán y los problemas del comando supremo en sus primeras campañas de Nápoles”. Revista de Historia Militar. N.º 105. Págs.: 127–154. Ministerio de Defensa, Madrid.
- Lafuente, Modesto (1879). Historia General de España. Montaner y Simón.
- Pérez Gimena, J.A., 2018: "De Granada a Pavía. La evolución del ejército español desde 1482 a 1525". Revista de Historia Militar, N.º 123. Págs. 190–232. Ministerio de Defensa, Madrid.
- Silio y Cortés, César (1973). Isabel la Católica. Espasa-Calpe.
