= Battle of Rapallo (1495) =

First naval battle of the Italian Wars

- Part of the First Italian War
Date	2 May 1495
Location	Rapallo, Liguria, present-day Italy
Result	Genoese victory

Belligerents
Republic of Genoa	Kingdom of France

Commanders and leaders
Francesco Spinola; Fabrizio Giustignani	Louis de Miolans (POW)

Strength
8 galleys 1 carrack 2 xebecs	7 galleys 2 galleons 2 fuste

Casualties and losses
	Entire fleet captured

The battle of Rapallo was a naval battle fought on 2 May 1495, during the First Italian War, between a fleet of the Republic of Genoa under the command of Francesco Spinola and a French fleet under the command of Louis de Miolans.

The French fleet, consisting of seven galleys, two galleons and two fuste, was attacked at dawn on 2 May by a Genoese squadron consisting of eight galleys, a carrack and two xebecs, carrying six hundred infantrymen, at its moorings in Rapallo, home to a French garrison since a battle fought there on the previous year. Only two of the French galleys were fully manned, the rest having detached part of their crews to reinforce the land garrison in the wrong assumption, furthered by false rumors deliberately spread by the Genoese, that the main attack would come from land. Exploiting the surprise thus achieved, the Genoese captured the entire French fleet and then landed troops under the command of Gian Ludovico Fieschi and Giovanni Adorno, which with the help of an uprising among the local population, recaptured Rapallo and forced the French garrison to surrender.

The destruction of the French fleet led to the capture, a few days later, of a convoy of twelve unescorted French sailing vessels, carrying war booty and prisoners captured during Charles VIII’s campaign in the Kingdom of Naples; three hundred captive women kidnapped in Campania were thus freed, and the booty taken by the French in Naples fell in Genoese hands, being later partly used to fund the construction of the Basilica della Santissima Annunziata del Vastato, while the rest was given as prize to the Genoese captains and crews. Among the items recovered were the bronze doors of Castel Nuovo, which were returned to the Neapolitans and which still bear the signs of damage caused by the battle.

The loss of the logistical support of his fleet in the Tyrrhenian Sea contributed to hasten Charles VIII's decision to withdraw from Naples and return to France.
