= Italian War of 1494–1495 =

First phase of the Italian Wars (1494–1497)

First Italian War
- Part of the Italian Wars
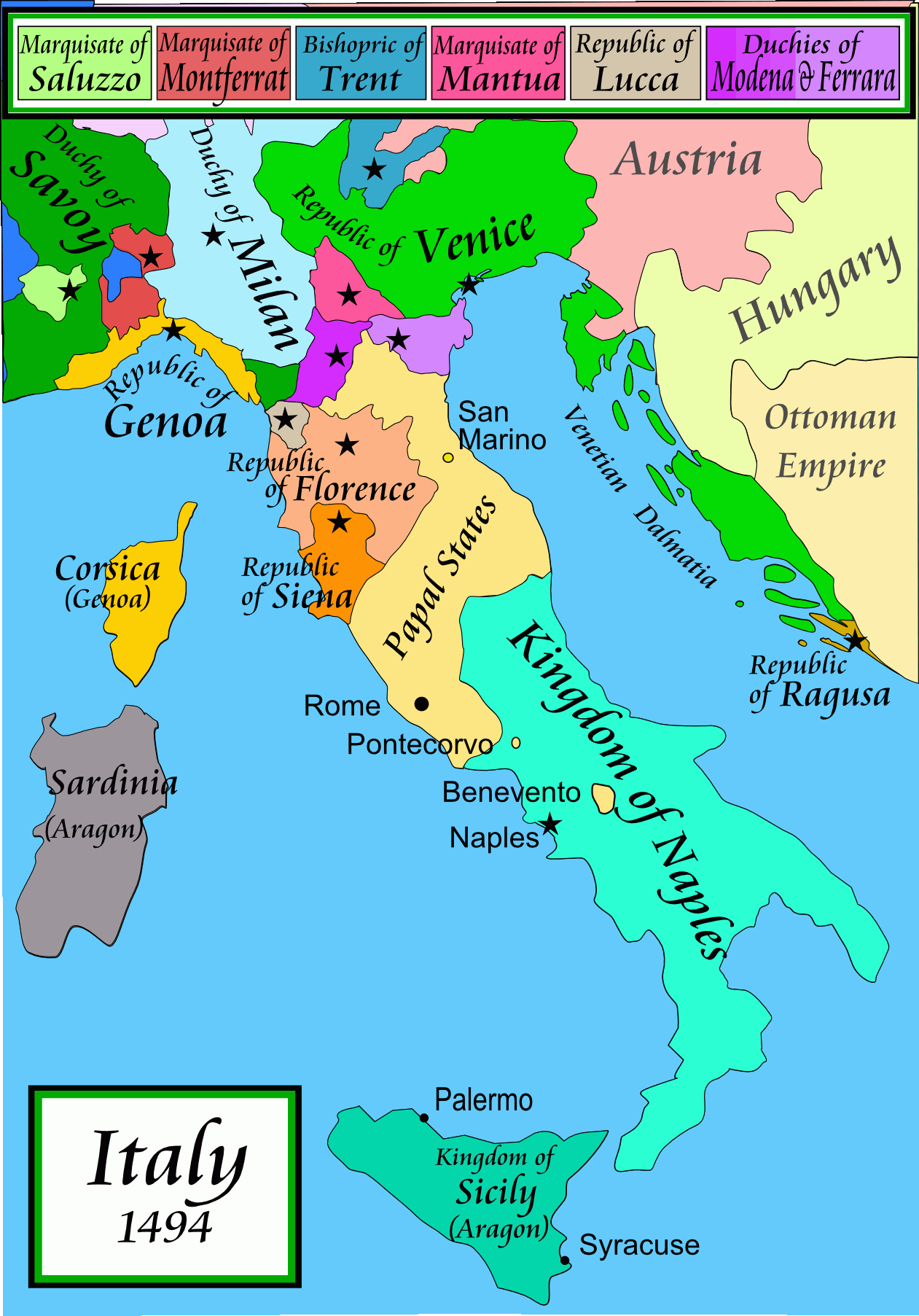
- Italy in 1494
Date	1494–1495
Location	Italy
Result	Victory for the League of Venice

Belligerents
Kingdom of France: (Old Swiss Confederacy) Swiss mercenaries; Duchy of Milan (before 1495); Duchy of Ferrara (officially neutral)	1494: Kingdom of Naples 1495: League of Venice; Papal States; Republic of Venice; Kingdom of Naples; Kingdoms of Spain; Duchy of Milan; Holy Roman Empire; Republic of Florence; England (1496–98); Margraviate of Mantua; Republic of Genoa

Commanders and leaders
Charles VIII; Duke of Orléans; Count of Montpensier; Louis de la Trémoille; Gian Francesco Sanseverino and Gaspare Sanseverino (before 1495); Ferrante d'Este	Ferdinand II of Naples; Frederick of Naples; Gonzalo Fernández de Córdoba; Francis II of Mantua; Galeazzo Sanseverino (after 1495); Alfonso I d'Este

Strength
25,000 men 8,000 Swiss mercenaries	

The First Italian War, or Charles VIII's Italian War, was the opening phase of the Italian Wars. The war pitted Charles VIII of France, who had initial Milanese aid, against the Holy Roman Empire, Spain and an alliance of Italian powers led by Pope Alexander VI, known as the League of Venice.

== Timeline ==
- 25 January 1494: King Ferdinand I of Naples died and was succeeded by his son Alfonso II of Naples (who also laid claim to Milan). King Charles VIII of France disputed the succession, and began preparations for an invasion of Italy to enforce his claim on the Neapolitan kingship.
- 5–8 September 1494: Battle of Rapallo. A land battle involving the French fleet. French victory; Neapolitans abandoned Rapallo, which the French army sacked.
- 11 September 1494: French King Charles VIII and Louis of Orléans arrived in Asti and concluded an alliance with Duke Ludovico Sforza and Beatrice d'Este.
- 17 October 1494: skirmishes near Sant'Agata sul Santerno. Tactical Neapolitan victories.
- 19–21 October 1494: Sacking of Mordano. Franco–Milanese victory; the French soldiers sacked Mordano, the Milanese soldiers tried to protect the civilians.
- 26–29 October 1494: Siege of Fivizzano. French victory; the French army sacked the town.
- 8–9 November 1494: Florentine revolt against de' Medici. Florentine republican victory; Piero the Unfortunate (who had submitted to all the French demands) was ousted, the Republic of Florence restored under the de facto leadership of Girolamo Savonarola.
- Mid-November – 28 November 1494: Tense French occupation of Florence. An anti-French revolt or a French sack of the city was averted, and Charles VIII marched on to Rome.
- 31 December 1494 – 6 January 1495: Peaceful French entry into Rome with Pope Alexander VI's permission, but some French looting took place.
- ? 1495: French conquest and destruction of the Castello di Monte San Giovanni Campano. French victory.
- ? 1495: French sack of Tuscania (Province of Viterbo). French victory.
- 22 February 1495: The French army captured Naples without a fight. Ferdinand II of Naples fled the city to Sicily, but kept fighting the French army elsewhere. Charles VIII was crowned king of Naples, and he appointed Gilbert, Count of Montpensier as his viceroy. Likely, the first documented outbreak of syphilis in history occurred amongst the French troops at Naples.
- 31 March 1495: Several Italian states (including Naples, Venice, Florence, Milan, the Papal States, Genoa and Mantua), Spain and the Holy Roman Empire formed the League of Venice to expel the French army from Italy. Milan defected from France to join the League of Venice.
- 2 May 1495: Battle of Rapallo (1495). League of Venice victory; the Genoese fleet defeated and captured the French fleet, and forced the French garrison of Rapallo to surrender. Much French war booty was lost, and Charles VIII's supply line was endangered.
- 30 May 1495: Charles split his army, leaving half of it behind to garrison the Kingdom of Naples, and taking the other half to march back to France.
- 11 June 1495: Occupation of Novara by Louis of Orléans.
- 28 June 1495: Battle of Seminara. French tactical victory; the French garrisons defeated the Neapolitan–Aragonese troops of Ferdinand II of Naples and Ferdinand II of Aragon (both Ferdinands were some of the last kings from the House of Trastámara).
- 1 July 1495: Skirmish near Giarolo. Tactical League of Venice victory; Francesco II Gonzaga defeated a small French scouting force.
- 6 July 1495: Battle of Fornovo. French victory; (Note: Santosuosso states the French had won the battle, both strategically and tactically, but not decisively.) the French army under Charles VIII managed to break through the forces of the League of Venice and march back to France, but lost nearly all the war booty.
- 6–7 July 1495: Neapolitan recapture of Naples. League of Venice victory; the Neapolitan–Aragonese troops defeated the French garrison of Naples, allowing Ferdinand II of Naples to return.
- 19 July – 21/24 September 1495: Siege of Novara (1495). League of Venice victory; troops commanded by Beatrice d'Este managed to defeat and drive out Louis of Orléans.
- 6 July – 8 December 1495: Siege of the Castel Nuovo (Maschio Angioino) in Naples, where the French viceroy of Naples, Gilbert, Count of Montpensier, held out after the city of Naples was captured by the Neapolitan–Aragonese troops. League of Venice victory.
- 24 September 1495: King Charles VIII of France and Duke Ludovico Sforza of Milan concluded a truce.
- 9 October 1495: Charles VIII and Ludovico Sforza concluded the Peace of Vercelli between France and Milan. The Venetians and Spanish claimed they were not properly consulted, and objected strongly to Sforza's and Francesco II Gonzaga, Marquess of Mantua's alleged unilateral diplomatic actions.
- 1496: England joined the League of Venice.
- July–August 1496: Siege of Atella. League of Venice victory; the French viceroy of Naples, Gilbert, Count of Montpensier, was forced to surrender to the Neapolitan–Aragonese troops, and died in prison in Pozzuoli in October 1496.
- 1497: Siege of Ostia.

== Prelude ==
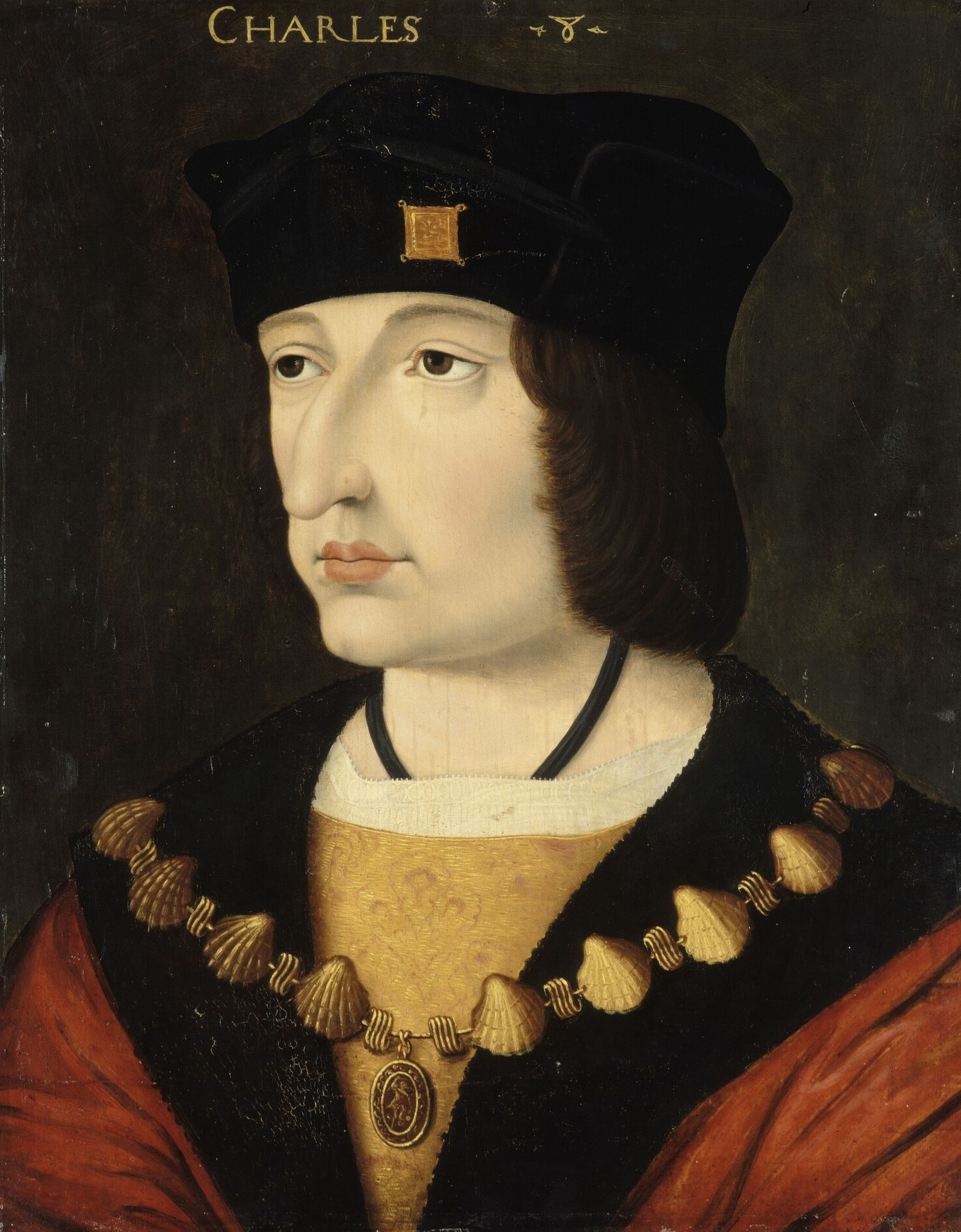
King Charles VIII of France.

Pope Innocent VIII, in conflict with King Ferdinand I of Naples over Ferdinand's refusal to pay feudal dues to the papacy, excommunicated and deposed Ferdinand by a bull of 11 September 1489. Innocent then offered the Kingdom of Naples to Charles VIII of France. The Angevin inheritance to Naples transferred to the French crown in December 1481, later forming the basis of Charles VIII’s claim. Innocent later settled his quarrel with Ferdinand and revoked the bans before dying in 1492, but the offer to Charles remained an apple of discord in Italian politics. Ferdinand died on 25 January 1494 and was succeeded by his son Alfonso II.

A third claimant to the Neapolitan throne was René II, Duke of Lorraine. He was the oldest son of Yolande, Duchess of Lorraine (died 1483), the only surviving child of René of Anjou (died 1480), the last effective Angevin King of Naples until 1442. In 1488 the Neapolitans had already offered the crown of Naples to René II, who set an expedition to gain possession of the realm, but he was then halted by Charles VIII of France, who intended to claim Naples himself. Charles VIII was arguing that his grandmother Marie of Anjou, the sister of René of Anjou, had a closer connection than Rene II's mother Yolande, the daughter of René of Anjou, and therefore he came first in the Angevin line of Neapolitan succession.

Casus belli of the conflict was the rivalry that arose between the Duchess of Bari, Beatrice d'Este, wife of Ludovico Sforza, known as the Moor, and the Duchess of Milan, Isabella of Aragon, wife of Gian Galeazzo Sforza, who both aspired to control of the Duchy of Milan and to the hereditary title for their children: since 1480 Ludovico Sforza ruled that duchy as regent of his little nephew Gian Galeazzo, not being therefore duke by right, but only de facto. The situation remained calm until 1489, when the marriage between Gian Galeazzo and Isabella of Aragon, granddaughter of King Ferrante of Naples as the daughter of Alfonso Duke of Calabria, took effect. Isabella immediately realized that all power was reduced to the hands of Louis and suffered from the ineptitude of her husband, listless and totally disinterested in the government; nevertheless he endured in silence until, in 1491, Ludovico married Beatrice d'Este, daughter of the Duke of Ferrara Ercole I d'Este and cousin of Isabella on her mother's side. Determined and ambitious young woman, Beatrice was soon associated by her husband with the government of the state, nor Isabella, "angry and desperate for envy", could bear to see herself surpassed in all honors by her cousin.

The Duchy of Milan was at the time the richest state in Italy after the Republic of Venice and its treasury amounted to as many as one and a half million ducats. In December Ludovico led his wife to see him and promised her that, if she gave him a son, he would make her a lady and mistress of everything; conversely, dying him, she would have very little left. Already in January 1492 Beatrice predicted to the Florentine ambassador that within a year she and her husband would be dukes of Milan, and the hostility between the two cousins became so intense that in February Ludovico, strong of some rumors coming from France, accused King Ferrante of having spurred Charles VIII to wage war against him, in order to free Gian Galeazzo from his tyranny; he also refused to meet the Neapolitan orator, except behind a very large armed escort, claiming that he was sent by the Duke of Calabria to assassinate him. To make the suspicions more concrete was added, at the end of the year, the attempted poisoning, perpetrated by Isabella of Aragon against Galeazzo Sanseverino, dear son-in-law and captain general of Ludovico Sforza, as well as the danger that this was repeated against some other member of the ducal family.

The point of definitive rupture, however, took place in January 1493, with the birth of Hercules Maximilian, eldest son of Moro and Beatrice: the possession of a legitimate descent was what was still missing for the spouses to be able to aspire to the ducal title. Rumors spread that Ludovico intended to appoint his son Count of Pavia – a title belonging exclusively to the heir to the duchy – in place of Isabella's son, Francesco. The latter, feeling threatened, asked for the intervention of her father Alfonso of Aragon, whose impetus was however restrained by the wiser King Ferrante, who repudiated the war by officially declaring: ""if the wife of the Duke of Milan is my granddaughter, the wife of the Duke of Bari is also my granddaughter". He, moreover, had been affectively very close to Beatrice, whom until 1485 he had raised as a daughter; he declared that he loved both granddaughters equally and urged them to be prudent, so that the situation remained stable until the king was alive.

In May Ludovico Sforza sent his wife Beatrice as his ambassador to Venice and communicated to the Signoria, through her, some of his secret practices with Emperor Maximilian I of Habsburg to obtain the investiture to the Duchy of Milan, as well as the secret news just communicated to him that Charles VIII, signed the peace with the emperor, was determined to carry out his enterprise against the kingdom of Naples and to appoint Ludovico head and conductor of said enterprise. The spouses therefore wished to know the opinion of the Signoria in this regard, and indirectly asked for its support. The Venetians replied that what was reported was very serious and limited themselves to vague reassurances, keeping out of these maneuvers.

Francesco Guicciardini spoke at this point of a certain journey planned by King Ferrante to Genoa, where, accompanied by his nephew Ferdinand II of Naples, he was supposed to meet Ludovico and Beatrice to persuade them to peace, but stopped in those days, he died on January 25, 1494, according to some more of sorrow than of illness. Ascending the throne, Alfonso I accepted the prayers of his daughter Isabella and occupied, as a first act of hostility, the city of Bari. From this came the reaction of Ludovico who, in order to respond to his threats, gave a free hand to the French monarch to go down to Italy.

Charles was also being encouraged by his favorite, Étienne de Vesc, as well as by Cardinal Giuliano della Rovere, the future Pope Julius II, who hoped to settle a score with the incumbent Pope, Alexander VI.

== Conflict ==
=== French invasion ===
Charles was preceded in Italy by his cousin Louis d'Orleans, who in July 1494 arrived in the territories of the Duchy of Milan with the vanguards of the French army, benevolently welcomed in Vigevano by the Dukes of Bari Ludovico Sforza and Beatrice d'Este, then settled in his fief of Asti. Only on 3 September 1494 King Charles moved to Italy through Montgenèvre, with an army of about 30,000 troops, of which 5,000 were Swiss mercenaries, equipped with modern artillery. Arriving in Piedmont he was greeted festively by the Dukes of Savoy, and then joined his cousin in the controlled County of Asti.

Charles VIII gathered a large army of 25,000 men, including 8,000 Swiss mercenaries and the first siege train to include artillery. He was aided by Louis d'Orleans victory over Neapolitan forces at the Battle of Rapallo which allowed Charles to march his army through the Republic of Genoa.

==== First Battle of Rapallo ====
Charles VIII was aware that his army, advancing into the long Italian peninsula towards Naples, needed naval help to ensure logistical support from the sea. The Aragonese maneuver was instead precisely to prevent him from freedom of maneuver in the Tyrrhenian Sea; already in July a Neapolitan fleet bombards the Genoese Porto Venere trying in vain to seize the base.

On September 5, 1494, the city of Rapallo in Liguria was reached by the Aragonese naval fleet that landed 4,000 Neapolitan soldiers commanded by Giulio Orsini, Obietto Fieschi and Fregosino Campofregoso: the intention was to raise the population of Rapallo against Genoa which at that time was subject to the Sforza lordship.

Three days later, a French army commanded by Louis d'Orléans arrived in the city, consisting of French soldiers, 3,000 Swiss mercenaries and Milanese contingents. The Swiss attacked the Neapolitans but most of the fighting involved the Milanese and Neapolitans. The French artillery then concentrating the shot on the Aragonese defeated them, forcing them to flee or surrender. The Orsini and the Campofregoso were taken prisoner. The Swiss also massacred those who intended to surrender and even the wounded, then sacked the city of Rapallo. This battle annihilated the Neapolitan fleet and opened the way to Liguria and central Italy to the army of Charles VIII.

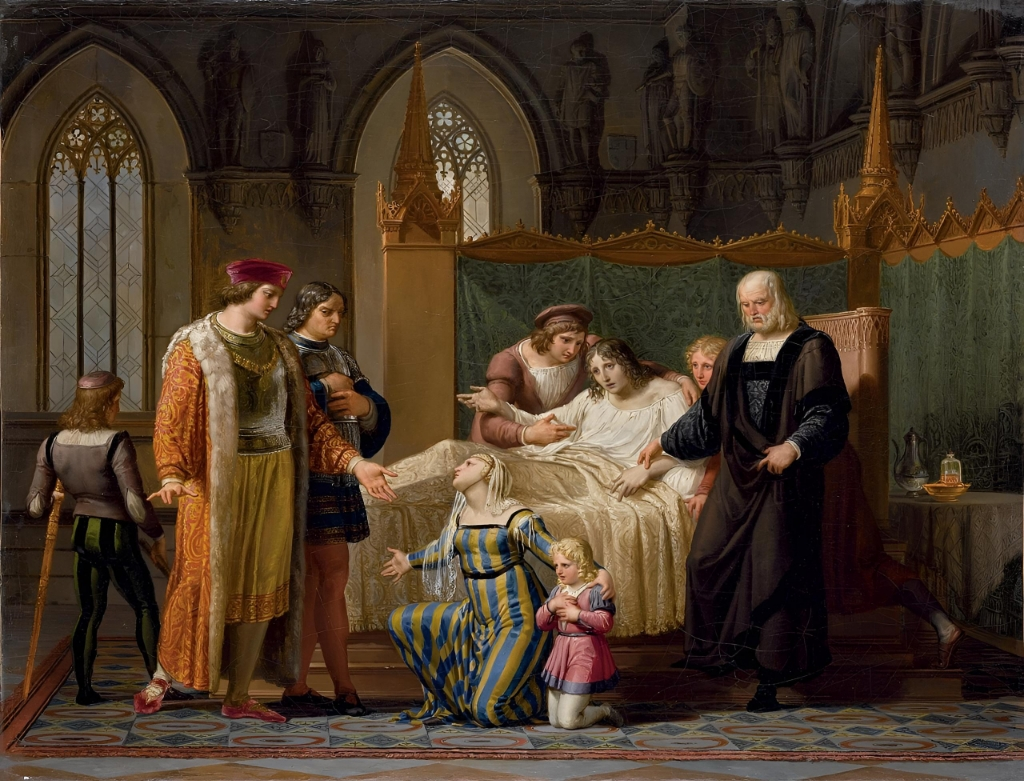
The meeting of Charles VIII and Gian Galeazzo Sforza in Pavia in 1494, Pelagio Palagi. In front of her dying husband's bed, Duchess Isabella begs the sovereign Charles VIII on his knees not to want to continue the war against Alfonso her father and entrusts him with her son Francesco. Next to the king, with a shady face, stands Duke Ludovico, presumed responsible for the poisoning.

==== Camp in Asti ====
The French army camped in Asti on September 11, where Charles VIII received the homage of his supporters: first of all Duke Ludovico Sforza with his wife Beatrice d'Este and his father-in-law Ercole d'Este, Duke of Ferrara. Margarita dè Solari, an eleven-year-old girl (in 1495 she dedicated Les Louanges du Mariage to him), staying in her father's Palace in Asti, listened to his hatreds. He immediately recalled his cousin Luigi d'Orleans to Asti from Genoa, who arrived on 15 September.

On September 13, Duchess Beatrice had ordered a splendid feast to please the king, but on that same day Charles fell seriously ill with an evil that at that time was mistaken for smallpox, but which was more likely a first manifestation of syphilis. For this event the very continuation of the war was questioned: many members of the king's retinue wished to return to France. The indisposition, however, was short-lived: already on September 21 King Charles got out of bed, and Louis d'Orleans fell ill with double Quartan fever.

Duke Ercole d'Este counted, perhaps through the intercession of his daughter and son-in-law, to be appointed captain general of the army French, but since he realized that the project would not go through, on September 22 he left discontent for Ferrara.

Leaving Asti, Carlo was hosted in Vigevano by the Dukes of Bari, then in Pavia, where he wanted to meet Gian Galeazzo Sforza dying in bed. His wife Isabella of Aragon at first refused with absolute rigor to meet the king, threatening suicide with a knife in front of the astonished Ludovico Sforza and Galeazzo Sanseverino, in case they wanted to force her, saying: "first I will kill myself, that never go to his presence of who goes to the ruin of the King my father!"; at a later time she went of her own free will to her husband's room, threw herself on her knees at the feet of King Charles and, showing him her son Francesco, begged him to protect his family from the aims of Ludovico Sforza and to renounce the conquest of his father's kingdom, all in the presence of Ludovico himself. The king was moved by that scene, and promised to protect his son, but replied that he could not stop a war that had begun. A month after this meeting Gian Galeazzo Sforza died, he said he was poisoned, and Ludovico il Moro became lord of Milan.

==== Descent in Tuscany ====
The King of Naples, Alfonso of Aragon, entrusted the general command of the Neapolitan army to his son Ferdinand who, although young, was endowed with exceptional qualities in both war and politics. In September and October he stopped with the troops in Romagna, where he sought the alliance of Caterina Sforza, lady of Forlì and Imola, to secure that important place of transit to Naples.

The alliance, however, did not last long because, on 19 October a contingent of Charles' army besieged the fortress of Mordano. After refusing to surrender, the fortress was bombarded, taken by French-Milanese forces, and the surviving inhabitants massacred. Caterina Sforza accused her Neapolitan allies of not having wanted to come to her rescue and therefore changed alliances, passing to the side of the French. Ferdinand and his whole army were forced to leave Cesena in a hurry.

Charles had at first intended to travel the Via Emilia to Romagna, but changed his plans and, after a stop in Piacenza, headed towards Florence. The city was traditionally pro-French, but the uncertain policy of its lord, Piero di Lorenzo de' Medici, son of Lorenzo the Magnificent, had deployed it in defense of the Aragonese King of Naples.

The looming danger of looting and violence of the French army (emphasized by the impassioned sermons of Girolamo Savonarola) that heightened the resentment of most citizens against the Medici came to pass when Charles VIII entered Fivizzano on October 29. Later, Charles laid siege to the fortress of Sarzanello, demanding that they open the way to Florence. Piero, having taken new counsel, went to meet the king to negotiate, and was forced to grant him the fortresses of Sarzanello, Sarzana and Pietrasanta, the cities of Pisa and Livorno with their ports useful to French ships in support of the army, and the green light for Florence.

Returning to Florence on November 8, Piero was forced to flee from citizens who accused him of a cowardly and servile attitude and proclaimed the Republic. At the same time the Florentines facilitated the invasion of Charles VIII, considering him restorer of their freedom and reformer of the Church (whose Pope Alexander VI, who ascended to the papal throne on August 26, 1492, was considered unworthy by Savonarola).

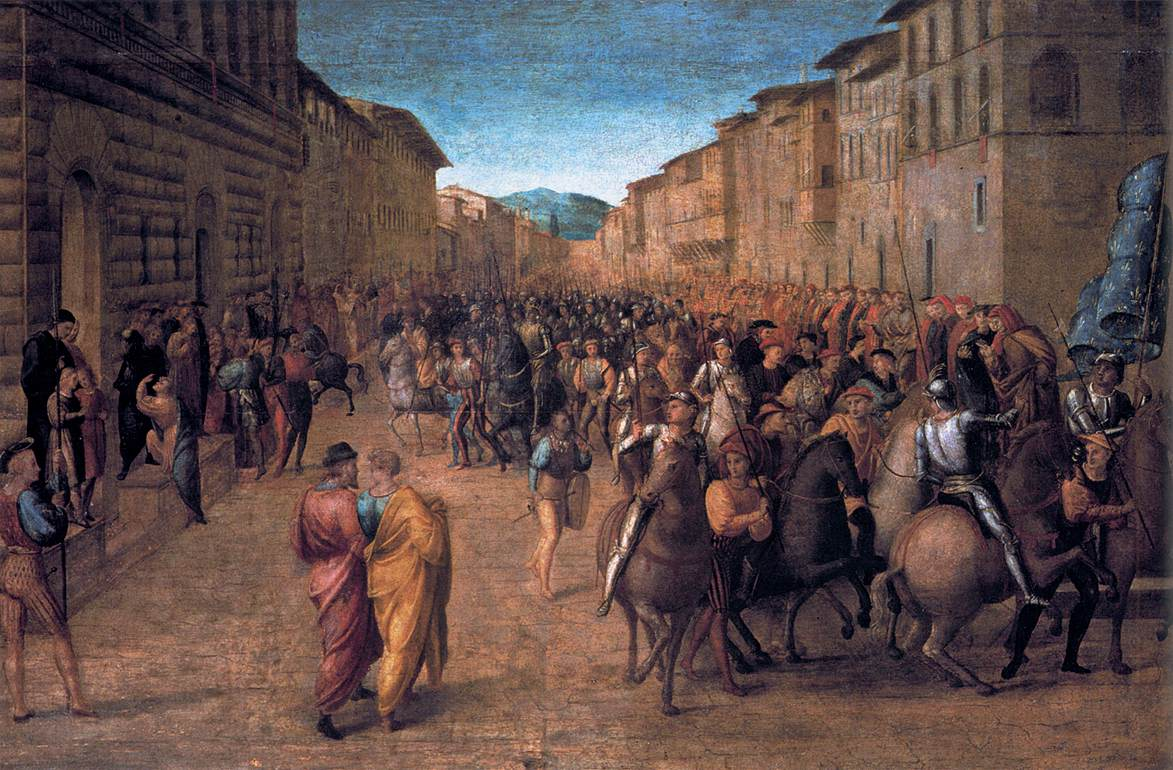
Triumphal entry of Charles VIII in Florence, November 17, 1494, by Francesco Granacci.

In Florence, however, a conflict immediately arose when the liberator Charles made a demand for a huge sum of money that the Florentine government refused. The French king threatened to order the looting of the city by the blowing of trumpets, to which the gonfalonier Pier Capponi replied that Florence would respond by ringing the city bells to call the people to resist. Rather than face the dangerous threat of a revolt, Charles chose instead to continue towards Rome.

==== Passage to Lazio ====
Charles, however, fearful of antagonizing the European powers, did not intend to depose the Borgia from the papacy. He marched to Rome and first took Civitavecchia, and on December 31, 1494, taking advantage of a fortunate coincidence, he obtained from Pope Alexander VI a peaceful entry into the Eternal City. The pope's mistress Giulia Farnese, wife of his ally Orsino Orsini, had been taken prisoner by French soldiers while traveling from Bassanello to the Vatican with her mother-in-law Adriana Mila. Charles used them as bargaining chips: the women were freed within a month and the French army was able to parade into Rome. The agreement did not, however, spare Rome from the looting of French troops. To avoid a further stay in the city, on January 6, 1495, Alexander VI welcomed Charles VIII and authorized his passage through the Papal States towards Naples, alongside his son Cesare Borgia as cardinal legate. Charles VIII besieged and conquered the castle of Monte San Giovanni, killing 700 inhabitants, and Tuscania (Viterbo), destroying two terzieri and killing 800 inhabitants.

==== Abdication of Alfonso II ====
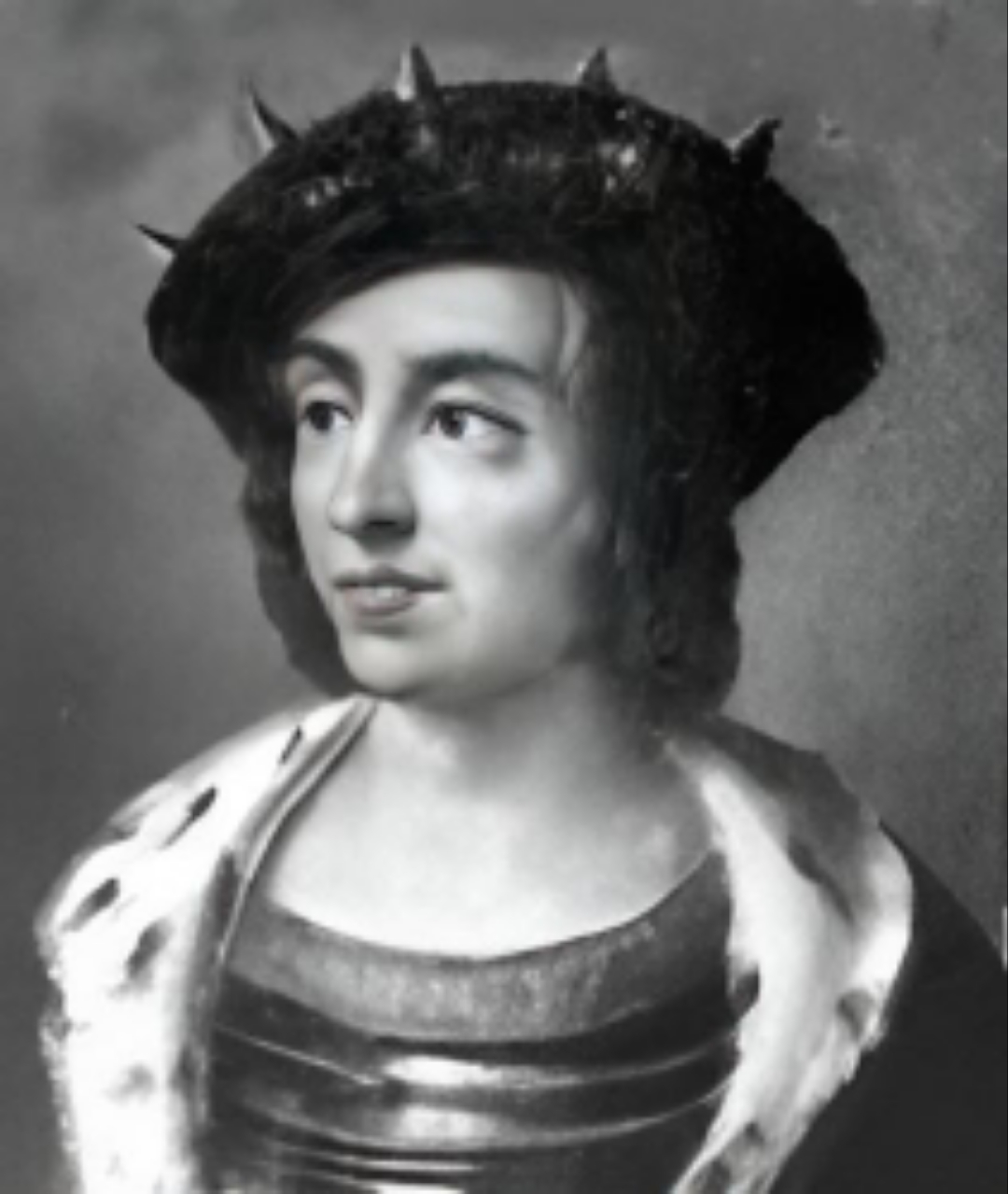
Alleged portrait of King Ferdinand.

Knowing that he was deeply hated by the Neapolitan people and their allies, on January 22, 1495, Alfonso II decided to abdicate in favor of his more-popular son Ferdinand, in the hope that this would be enough to improve the political situation. Despite the efforts of the new king to remedy the mistakes made by his predecessors, it was insufficient to avoid the French conquest of Naples. Betrayed by his captains and a growing number of cities giving their allegiance to the invaders, Ferdinand made the drastic decision to abandon Naples in search of reinforcements. Before leaving, however, he made a public promise that he would return within 15 days, and that if he did not do so they could all be considered free from the oath of fidelity and obedience made to him. He went with the royal family to Ischia, then to Messina.

==== Conquest of Naples ====
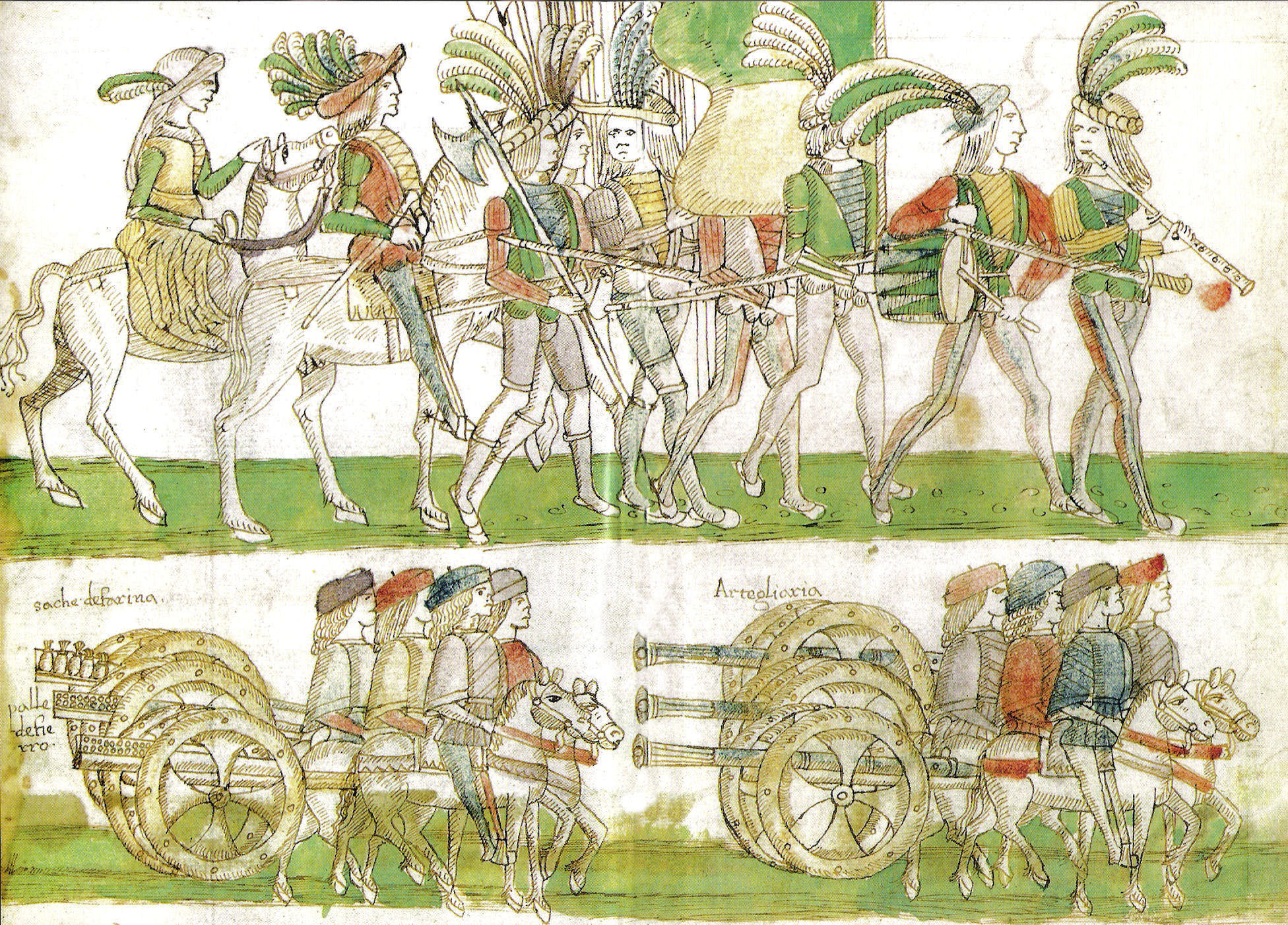
Entry of French troops in Naples, February 22, 1495, from the Figurative Chronicle of the Fifteenth Century by Melchiorre Ferraiolo

On February 22, King Charles occupied Naples without a fight, and the Neapolitan nobles opened the doors to him and crowned him king of Naples. The French occupation, however, quickly incited the hatred of the Neapolitans, who suffered continuous abuses. By May, equipped with fresh troops and the support of allies, Ferdinand II of Naples was able to return to the peninsula, acclaimed by cries of "Ferro! Ferro!" and began, from [Puglia], the difficult reconquest of his kingdom.

Despite his defeat in the Battle of Seminara, Ferdinand's campaign ultimately proved to be a success. On July 7, after defeating the last French garrisons, he was able to return to Naples, welcomed by the festive population.

=== League of Venice ===
The speed of the French advance, together with the brutality of their sack of Mordano, left the other states of Italy in shock. Ludovico Sforza, realizing that Charles had a claim to Milan as well as Naples, and would probably not be satisfied by the annexation of Naples alone, turned to Pope Alexander VI, who was embroiled in a power game of his own with France and various Italian states over his attempts to secure secular fiefdoms for his children. The Pope formed an alliance of several opponents of French hegemony in Italy: himself; Ferdinand of Aragon, who was also King of Sicily; the Emperor Maximilian I; Ludovico in Milan; and the Republic of Venice. (Venice's ostensible purpose in joining the League was to oppose the Ottoman Empire, while its actual objective was French expulsion from Italy.) This alliance was known as the Holy League of 1495, or as the League of Venice, and was proclaimed on 31 March 1495. England joined the League in 1496.

The League gathered an army under the condottiero Francesco II Gonzaga, Marquess of Mantua. Including most of the city-states of northern Italy, the League of Venice threatened to shut off King Charles's land route by which to return to France. Charles VIII, not wanting to be trapped in Naples, marched north to Lombardy on 20 May 1495, leaving Gilbert, Count of Montpensier, in Naples as his viceroy, with a substantial garrison. After Ferdinand of Aragon had recovered Naples, with the help of his Spanish relatives with whom he had sought asylum in Sicily, the army of the League followed Charles's retreat northwards through Rome, which had been abandoned to the French by Pope Alexander VI on 27 May 1495.

=== Siege of Novara ===
The king's cousin, Louis d'Orléans, had not followed Charles on his march to Naples, but had remained in his own fief of Asti, having fallen ill with malaria in September of the previous year. He now threatened to implement his plan to conquer the Duchy of Milan, which he considered his right, being a descendant of Valentina Visconti. On 11 June he occupied with his troops the city of Novara, which was given to him by treason, and went as far as Vigevano.

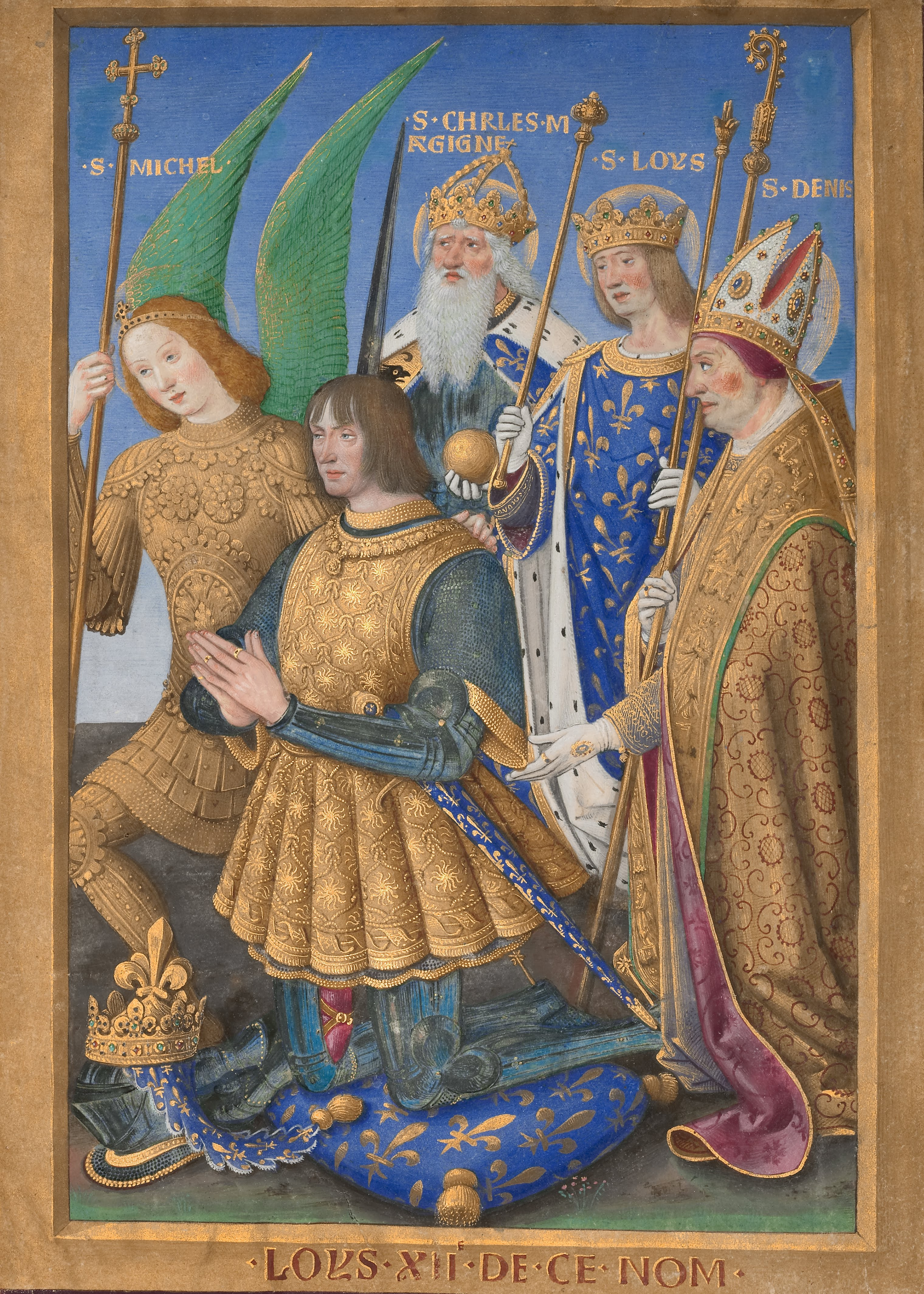
Louis d'Orleans at the age of 36 (1498).

Ludovico il Moro then took refuge with his family in the Rocca del Castello in Milan but, not feeling equally safe, he meditated on abandoning the duchy to take refuge in Spain. The firm opposition of his wife Beatrice d'Este and some members of the council convinced him to desist. However, the state was suffering from a severe financial crisis, there was no money to pay for the army and the people threatened to revolt. Comines writes that, if the Duke of Orleans had advanced only a hundred paces, the Milanese army would have crossed the Ticino again, and he would have managed to enter Milan, since some noble citizens had offered to introduce him.

Ludovico did not resist the tension and fell ill, perhaps due to a stroke (according to the hypothesis of some historians), since, as reported by the chronicler Malipiero, he had become paralytic of a hand, he never left the bedroom and was rarely seen. The government of the state was then taken over by the Duchess Beatrice, appointed for the occasion governor of Milan, who secured the support and loyalty of the Milanese nobles, took the necessary measures for the defense and abolished some taxes in hatred of the people.

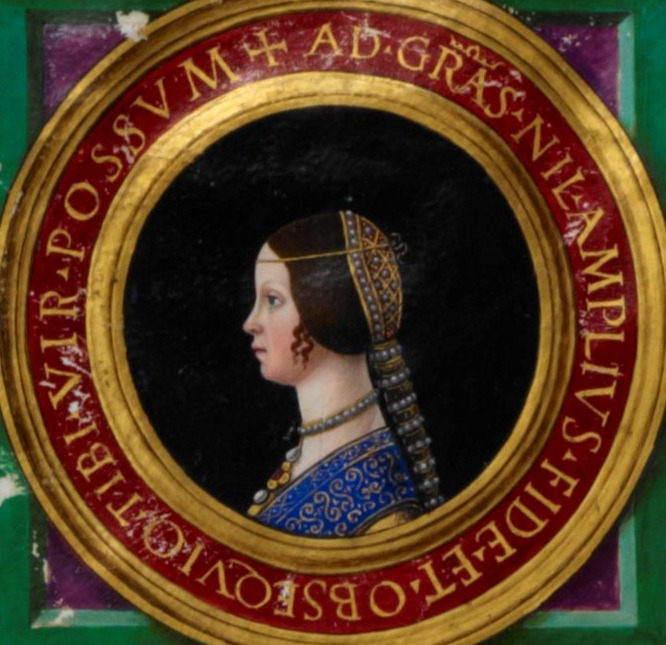
Beatrice d'Este at the age of 18 (1494).

The army of the league had meanwhile moved near Vigevano. Captain General of the Sforza army was then Galeazzo Sanseverino, while the Serenissima sent Bernardo Contarini, provveditore of the stradiotti, to the rescue of Milan. However, in June the Lordship of Venice – according to Malipiero – had meanwhile discovered how the Duke of Ferrara, Beatrice's father, together with the Florentines kept King Charles informed every day of everything that was being done in Venice as in Lombardy, then secretly supplying the Duke of Orleans in Novara, as he sought the king's help in the recovery of the Polesine, stolen from him by the Venetians at the time of the Salt War. In addition the leader Fracasso, Galeazzo's brother, was accused of double game with the king of France. The suspicions were corroborated by the fact that the latter had responded with little respect to the Marquis Francesco Gonzaga, when the latter during a council of war accused him of not collaborating in war operations.

Not being able to count on her father's help, on June 27 Beatrice d'Este went alone, without her husband, to the military camp of Vigevano, both to supervise the order and to animate her captains to move against the Duke of Orleans, who in those days was constantly making raids in that area. Guicciardini's opinion is that if the latter had attempted the assault immediately, he would have taken Milan, since the defense resided only in Galeazzo Sanseverino, but Beatrice's demonstration of strength was able to confuse him in making him believe the defenses superior to what they were, so that he did not dare to try his luck and retired to Novara. The hesitation was fatal to him, as it allowed Galeazzo to reorganize the troops and surround him, thus forcing him to a long and exhausting siege.

Meanwhile, the city was decimated by famine and epidemics that decimated the enemy army. The Duke of Orleans, also ill with malarial fevers, urged his men to resist with the false promise that the king's help would soon come. He was finally forced to cede the city on 24 September 1495 at the behest of King Charles, who was returning to France, and the enterprise ended in nothing.

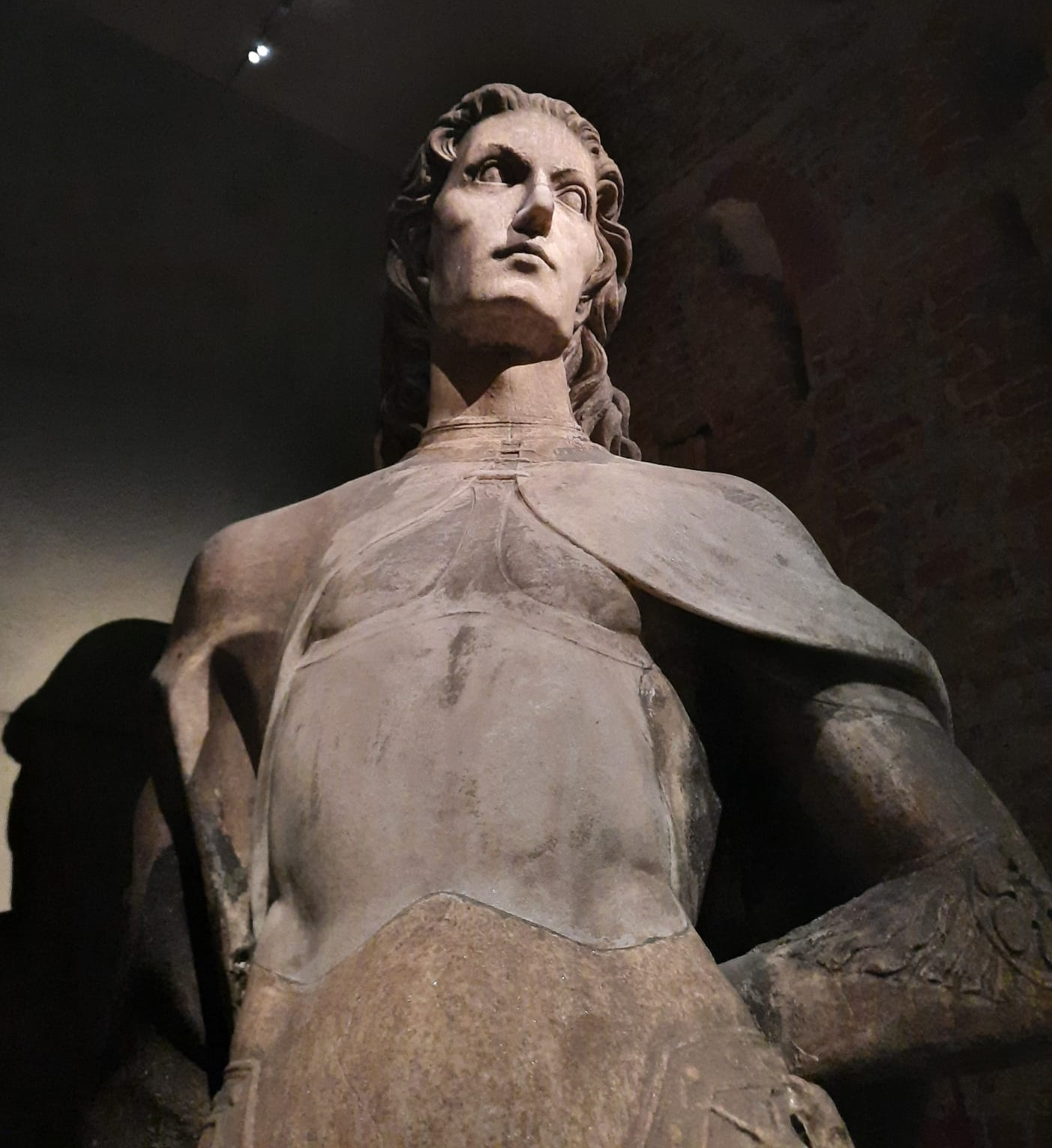
Probable portrait of Galeazzo Sanseverino, statue in the collection of the Great Museum of the Duomo of Milan

=== Battle of Fornovo ===
Charles, wanting to avoid being trapped in Campania, on May 20 left Naples and marched north to reach Lombardy, but met the army of the League in the Battle of Fornovo, 30 km (19 miles) southwest of the city of Parma, on 6 July 1495. The result of the battle was however uncertain, and, in some ways, it still is today, because, despite the League having numerical superiority and the command of one of the most skilled leaders of the time, Francesco Gonzaga, the army of Charles VIII remained more powerful from a technological point of view, and in the number and quality of artillery. At the time both the Italians and the French claimed to have won.

Both parties strove to present themselves as the victors in the battle. The battle was reported in Venice as a victory, and was recorded and celebrated as such, which included the capture of Mathieu de Bourbon. Regardless of the self-proclamations of victory by League commanders, Domenico Malipiero recognized that the League failed to stop the French from reaching Asti. Francesco Gonzaga claimed victory and ordered the portrait of the Madonna della Vittoria, while the Italian historian Francesco Guicciardini's judgement was to award the palm of victory to the French. (Note: If officially Italians celebrated the Battle of Fornovo as a victory – to the surprise of the French – privately, many were not so sure. Guicciardini’s verdict was that ‘general consent awarded the palm to the French’) Privately, Gonzaga confessed to his wife that the battle was a near run thing and that if the French had turned on them, the League's forces would have been destroyed. A week later, Bernardino Fortebraccio spoke to the Venetian senate, stating the League's army could have defeated the French if their troops would have stayed in the battle and left the baggage train alone.

The French had won their battle, fighting off superior numbers and proceeding on their march to Asti. (Note: The battle of Fornovo, by which Charles forced his way past the enemy who stood in his path, was not an indecisive action but a definite victory for France.) The League took much higher casualties and could not prevent the French army from crossing Italian lands on its way back to France.

On the political level the States of the Holy League divided and resumed their policy against each other, (even within the States themselves) shortly after the clash, and this, regardless of how the military outcome of the battle of Fornovo had been, showed what and how great was the real weakness of the Italians: the internal divisions. Even if Fornovo had not been a total victory, every European sovereign would have hesitated in the face of the prospect of fighting in a foreign land and against a rich coalition (as we know, war is also fought with money) such as the eventual one of Italian Principalities, Lordships and Republics. And in fact Charles VIII had begun his retreat from Naples not because he had been defeated in the field, but from the serious prospect of such an eventuality. In this respect, the Battle of Fornovo was a deadly defeat for all the states of the League. (Note: "Florentine historian Francesco Guicciardini, in his History of Italy, states that “universal opinion awarded the palm of victory to the French.""Most sources, both the rewriting of Italian and French, state clearly that the French won at Fornovo, a triumph celebrated in a rare engraving of the battle made shortly after the event by an anonymous French artist. The conclusion of French victory is based on two factors: the Italians did not stop the northward march of the French, and the French sustained far fewer losses.")

==== Peace of Vercelli ====
It is known as the Peace of Vercelli because the chapters were signed in Vercelli, where the king was located, but it was actually discussed in the Novara camp: on the French side Philip of Comines, the president of Ganay and Morvilliers bailiff of Amiens intervened as orators; for part of the allies an envoy of the King of the Romans, the Ambassador of Spain Juan Claver, the Marquis Francesco Gonzaga, the provveditori Melchiorre Trevisan and Luca Pisani with the Venetian ambassador, Ludovico Sforza with his wife Beatrice and finally an ambassador of the Duke of Ferrara. The negotiations lasted more than fifteen days and the agreement was signed on October 9. A safe conduct was established for the Duke of Orleans, which was taken from Novara and went to Vercelli, despite the opposition of the latter, who did not want peace. Duke Ercole d'Este also seemed to be of the same opinion: he sent, according to Comines, Count Albertino Boschetti to Vercelli, with the excuse of asking for safe conduct for the Marquis of Mantua and others who had to come to discuss peace. Received by the king, the count suggested instead to resist, "saying that the whole camp was in great fear and that soon they would leave." Despite the many discordant opinions, the French accepted peace out of necessity, lack of money and other reasons, while being aware that it would be short-lived. The Venetians were then given two months to accept the peace, but they refused it.

The Monarch French retired to France through Lombardy: in the following years he meditated on a new campaign in Italy, but his untimely death from hitting his head against a door prevented him from implementing it. The Duke of Orleans, for his part, did not stop for a moment to threaten a second expedition against the Duchy of Milan, which had been on alert since 1496. This followed, however, only in 1499, with the second descent of the French into Italy, when he became king with the name of Louis XII, and Ludovico Sforza found himself without more allies.

==== Consequences ====
An important consequence of the League of Venice was the political marriage arranged by Maximilian I, Holy Roman Emperor for the son he had with Mary of Burgundy: Philip the Handsome married Joanna the Mad (daughter of Ferdinand II of Aragon and Isabella of Castile) to reinforce the anti-French alliance between Austria and Spain. The son of Philip and Joanna would become Charles V, Holy Roman Emperor in 1519, succeeding Maximilian and controlling a Habsburg empire which included Castile, Aragon, Austria, and the Burgundian Netherlands, thus encircling France.

The League was the first of its kind; there was no medieval precedent for such divergent European states uniting against a common enemy, although many such alliances would be forged in the future.

== Syphilis outbreak ==
During this war an outbreak of syphilis occurred among the French troops. This outbreak was the first widely documented outbreak of the disease in human history, and eventually led to the Columbian theory of the origin of syphilis.

== Gallery ==
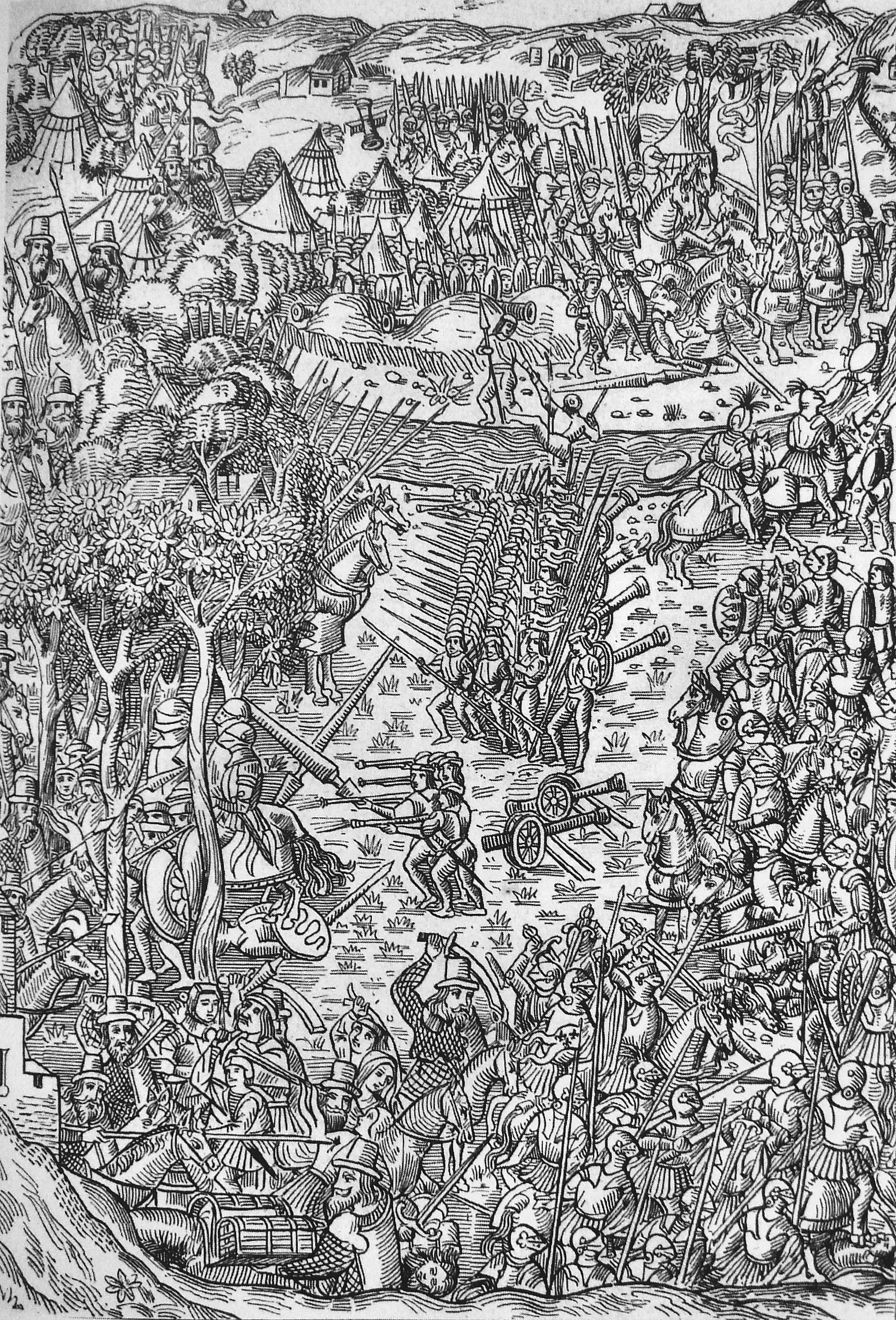
Battle of Fornovo, 6 July 1495.

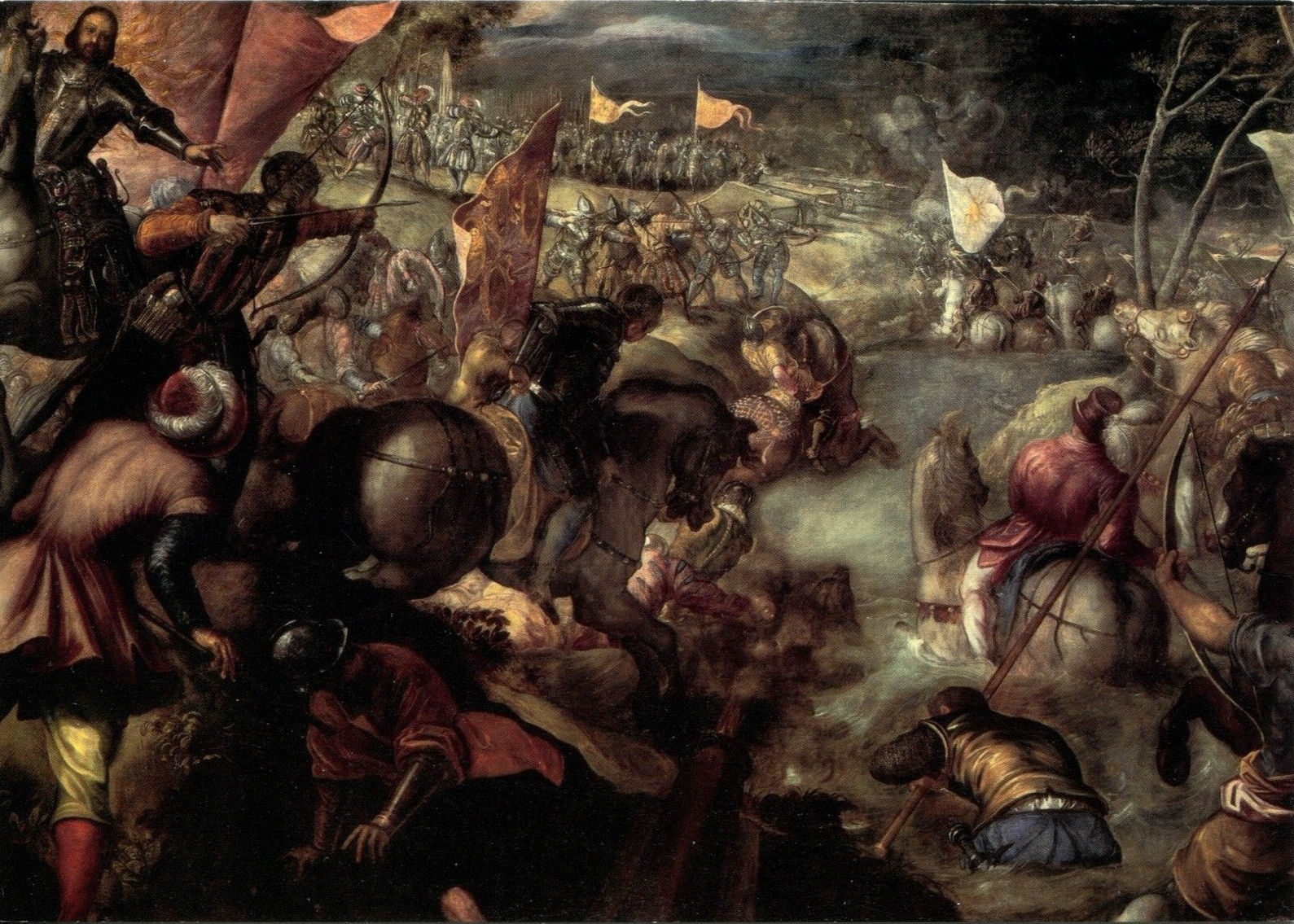
Francesco II Gonzaga at the Battle of Taro, Jacopo Tintoretto, 1578–1579.

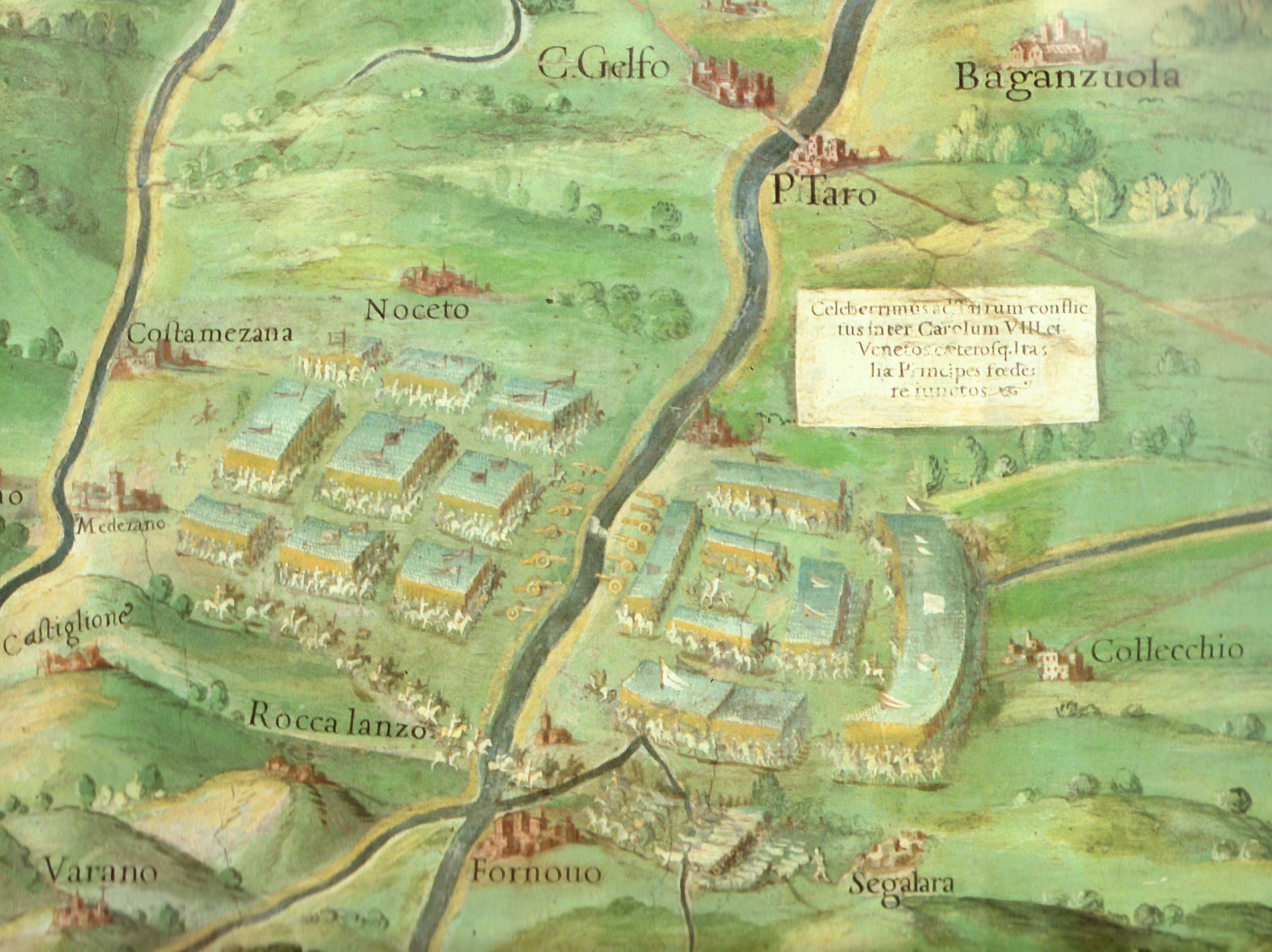
The Battle of Fornovo, Galleria delle carte geografiche, Vatican museums.

== Bibliography ==
- Anonimo ferrarese (1928). Giuseppe Pardi (ed.). Diario ferrarese. Rerum italicarum scriptores, raccolta degli storici italiani dal Cinquecento al Millecinquecento, fasc. 1, vol. 24. Zanichelli.
- Dina, Achille (1921). Isabella d'Aragona Duchessa di Milano e di Bari, 1471–1524. Milan: Tipografia San Giuseppe. p. 366.
- James, Carolyn (2020). A Renaissance Marriage: The Political and Personal Alliance of Isabella d'Este and Francesco Gonzaga, 1490–1519. Oxford: Oxford University Press. p. 224. ISBN 9780199681211.
- Kokkonen, Andrej; Sundell, Anders (2017). Online supplementary appendix for "The King is Dead: Political Succession and War in Europe, 1000–1799" (PDF). Gothenburg: University of Gothenburg.
- Kuiper, Kathleen, ed. (2009). The 100 Most Influential Painters & Sculptors of the Renaissance. Britannica Educational Publishing.
- Mallett, Michael; Shaw, Christine (2012). The Italian Wars: 1494–1559. Pearson Education Limited.
- Maulde-La-Clavière, René (1891). Histoire de Louis XII: première partie. Louis d'Orléans. Tome III. Vol. 3. Paris: Ernest Leroux.
- Nelson, Jonathan K.; Zeckhauser, Richard J. (2008). The Patron's Payoff: Conspicuous Commissions in Italian Renaissance Art. Princeton University Press. "Most sources, both the rewriting of Italian and French, state clearly that the French won at Fornovo, a triumph celebrated in a rare engraving of the battle made shortly after the event by an anonymous French artist. The conclusion of French victory is based on two factors: the Italians did not stop the northward march of the French, and the French sustained far fewer losses."
- Nicolle, David (2005). Fornovo 1495: France's Bloody Fighting Retreat. Praeger illustrated military history series. Westport Connecticut: Osprey. ISBN 978-0-275-98850-0.
- Pastor, Ludwig von (1902). The History of the Popes, from the close of the Middle Ages, third edition, Volume V Saint Louis: B. Herder 1902.
- Pellegrini, Marco (2009). Le guerre d'Italia : (1494–1530). Il mulino. Bologna. ISBN 978-88-15-13046-4.
- Santosuosso, Antonio (1994). "Anatomy of Defeat in Renaissance Italy: The Battle of Fornovo in 1495". The International History Review. 16, No. 2 (May) (2). Taylor & Francis, Ltd.: 221–250. doi:10.1080/07075332.1994.9640674.
- Setton, Kenneth M. (1978). The Papacy and the Levant (1204–1571), Volume II: The Fifteenth Century. Vol. 2. Philadelphia: The American Philosophical Society. ISBN 0-87169-127-2.* Summaripa, Giorgio (1496). Cronica de le cose geste nel Regno Napolitano. Venice: Christoforo Cremonese.
- Taylor, Frederick Lewis (1921). The Art of War in Italy 1494–1529: Prince Consort Prize Essay 1920. Cambridge library collection. European History. Cambridge University Press. OCLC 967401725 – via Archive Foundation.
- Tucker, Spencer C., ed. (2010). "1494-1495: Southern Europe: Italy: First Italian War". A Global Chronology of Conflict: From the ancient world to the modern middle east. Vol. one: ca.3000 BCE-1499 CE. ABC-CLIO. ISBN 978-1-85109-667-1.
- Watkins, Robert Dorsey (1927). The State as a Party Litigant. The Johns Hopkins University Press.
- Zambotti, Bernardino (1937). Giuseppe Pardi (ed.). Diario ferrarese dall'anno 1476 sino al 1504. Rerum Italicarum scriptores ordinata da Ludovico Antonio Muratori. Bologna: Zanichelli.
