= Battle of Fornovo =

1495 battle of the First Italian War

- Part of the First Italian War
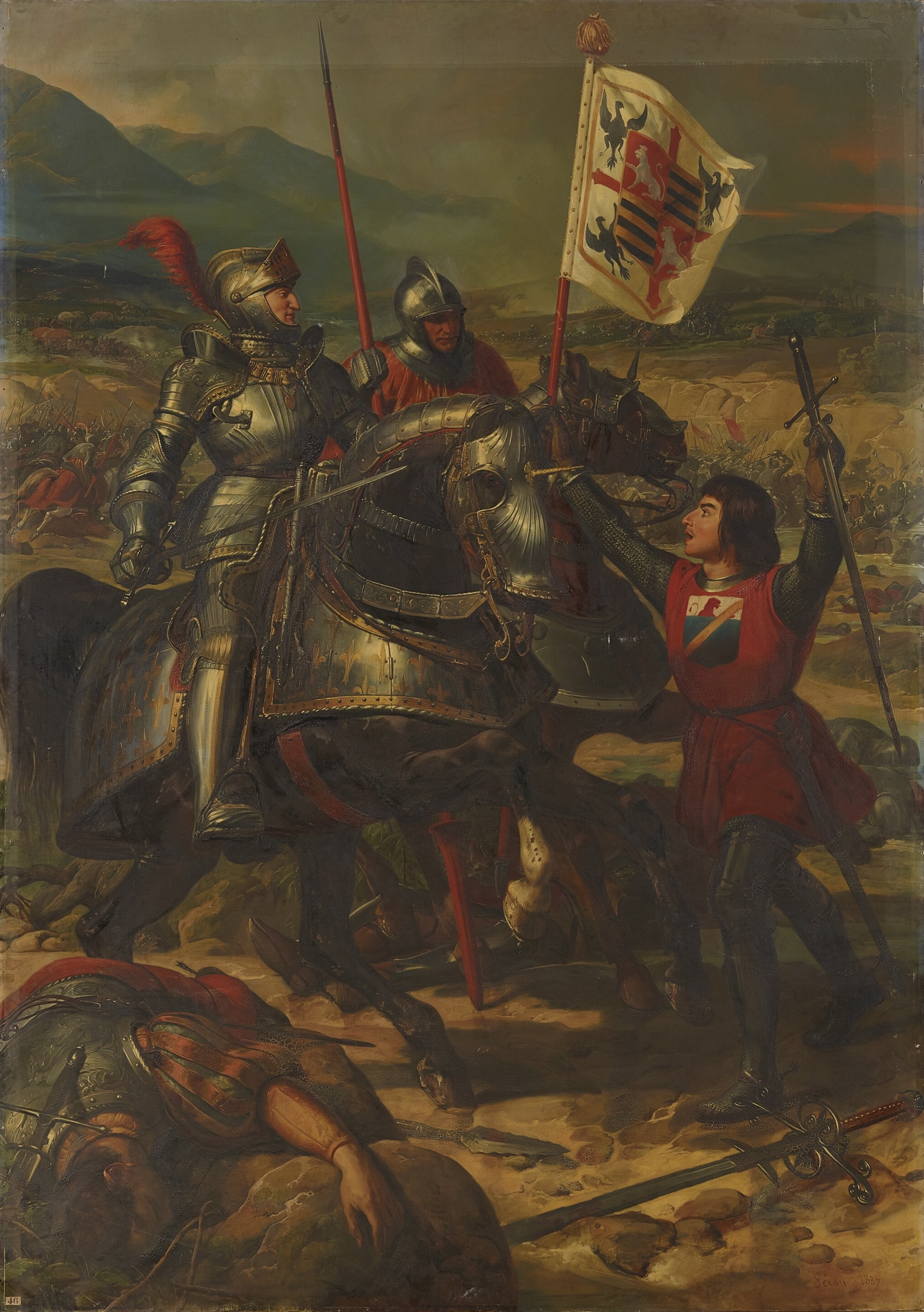
- Bataille de Fornoue, 6 juillet 1495 (oil on canvas by Éloi Firmin Féron, 1837) depicts king Charles VIII on the left and Bayard on the right.
Date	6 July 1495
Location	Fornovo, Emilia, Italy 44°41′N 10°06′E
Result	French victory

Belligerents
France	League of Venice: Republic of Venice; Duchy of Milan; Margraviate of Mantua

Commanders and leaders
King Charles VIII	Francesco Gonzaga, Marquess of Mantua

Units involved
	Stradioti

Strength
10,000–11,000 men (Note: "The French army of 10,000–11,000 men came down the valley of the Taro towards Parma. Gonzaga had about 20,000 troops...".)	20,000–21,500 men

Casualties and losses
100–1,000 killed 200 wounded	3,350–4,000 killed
- Fornovo di Taro, now a comune (municipality) in the province of Parma

The Battle of Fornovo took place 30 km (19 miles) southwest of the city of Parma on 6 July 1495. It was fought as King Charles VIII of France left Naples upon hearing the news of the grand coalition assembled against him. Despite the numerical advantage of their opponents, the French won the engagement and Charles was able to march his army out of Italy. It was nonetheless devoid of any strategic result as all of their conquests in the Italian Peninsula were abandoned. Fornovo was the first major pitched battle of the Italian Wars.

== Background ==
In 1489, Pope Innocent VIII deposed Ferdinand I and offered the Kingdom of Naples to Charles VIII of France. (Note: Watkins states Ferdinand I of Naples was excommunicated and deposed by Pope Innocent VIII.) The Angevin inheritance to Naples transferred to the French crown in December 1481, later forming the basis of Charles VIII's claim. In 1495, Charles VIII was King of France, the most powerful state in medieval Europe. A dreamer who saw himself as the saviour of Christian Europe, he believed he could roll-back the ever-spreading tide of Ottoman Turkish conquests. As a base for his crusade, he was determined to seize Southern Italy.

To have his hands free in Italy, Charles made various pacts with his neighbours, so they would not interfere. Henry VII of England was given cash, Ferdinand II of Aragon was given Roussillon, and Emperor Maximillian was given Artois and Franche-Comté.

== Campaign ==
Charles VIII was on good terms with the two powers in northern Italy, Milan and Venice, and both had encouraged his claim over the Kingdom of Naples. Thus he assumed he would have their support when he moved against Alfonso II of Naples, especially as the rival claimant was Ferdinand II of Aragon, King of Spain. At the end of August 1494, in a lightning campaign, he used France's powerful modern army, reinforced by a large contingent of Swiss mercenaries, to sweep through Italy, his mobile field artillery train smashing into dust the tall towers of Italy's medieval castles. He was granted free passage through Milan, but was vigorously opposed by Florence, Pope Alexander VI, and Naples.

On 22 February 1495 Charles VIII and his chief commander, Louis II de La Trémoille, entered Naples almost without opposition. The speed and violence of the campaign left the Italians stunned. Realization struck them, especially the Venetians and the new Duke of Milan, Ludovico Sforza, that unless Charles was stopped Italy would soon just be another province of France. The Italian states rallied and on March 31 in Venice, the Holy League was proclaimed. The signatories were the Republic of Venice, the Duke of Milan, the Pope, the monarchs of Castile and Aragon, the King of England and the Holy Roman Emperor.

== Retreat ==
The League engaged a veteran condottiero, Francesco II Gonzaga, Marquis of Mantua to gather an army and expel the French from Italy. Upon hearing the news of the coalition assembled against him, Charles VIII left behind a garrisoning force in Naples and marched north with the remainder of his army, his artillery train and the considerable booty seized in the campaign thus far in order to join a smaller army under Louis II, Duke of Orléans in Piedmont in north-western Italy.

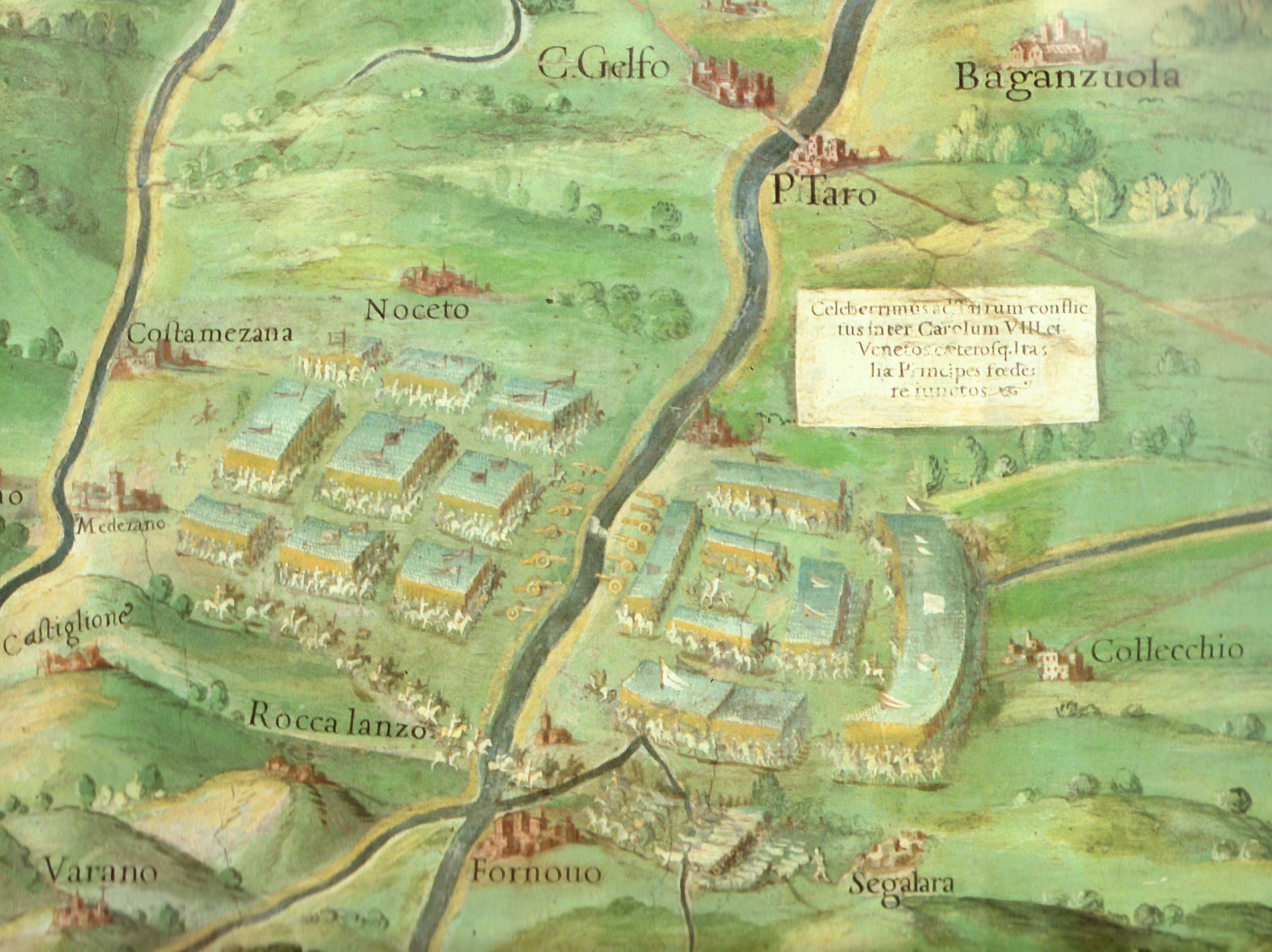
The Battle of Fornovo in the Gallery of Maps (Vatican Museums)

On 27 June the Venetians and their allies established camp near Fornovo di Taro (44°41′N 10°06′E), some 30 km southwest of Parma, to wait for the French. They would not have to wait long, but the Venetian Senate was not unanimous on fighting the French. Some members wanted to attack the rear guard of the French to try to seize their loot, while others cautioned that Italy was risking too much in this battle as this was just one French army and others could potentially be called upon.

On July 4, Ercole d'Este, Duke of Ferrara, Charles' strongest ally in Italy, wrote to him and informed him that the Senate had not yet decided on an action. But Charles was anxious, seeing the enemy numbers growing, while he himself had no hope of reinforcements for the time being. When an effort to sway the undecided forces of Parma was thwarted by the Venetians, Charles instead sent a messenger to request free passage to return to France, but the Venetians replied that he would have to restore all his conquests before such could be considered. The messenger, having scouted the troops, reported back to Charles. The 40 soldiers Charles subsequently sent to reconnoiter were attacked and quickly routed by the Stradioti, mostly Albanian mercenaries from the Balkans.

Two days later, on July 6, Charles decided to offer battle because the French were short of provisions. South of Milan, the path of his army of some 10,000 French and Swiss was blocked by 20,000 Venetians and Mantuans under Gonzaga. Melchiorre Trevisan promised the League soldiers the spoils of battle if they were victorious, igniting their combat ardor. Francesco Gonzaga divided his forces into nine lines. His battle plan was to distract the first and middle groups of the French with two lines while outflanking the rear. Once the French groups were disorganized, the rest of the Italian troops would attack. The League's overall goal was the complete destruction of the French army. (Note: Malipiero mentions the League's failure to stop the French from reaching Asti.)

== Battle ==
The League army took position on the right side of the Taro river and the French decided to keep to the left bank. Charles organized his army in battle groups. The first section consisted of about 2,500 men and was led by Marshal Gie and Gian Giacomo Trivulzio. The second and largest section, led by Englebert of Cleves and Antoine de Bessey, consisted of 3000 infantry, 300 dismounted archers and 200 crossbowman. The final section, about 1,750 men, was led by Jean de Foix. There was in addition a large infantry force of spearmen. The French artillery was arranged in front of the first line, as well as on the side of the Taro, protecting the second line. The League's right wing was commanded by Count Caiazzo with 400 Milanese men-at-arms and 2000 infantry, with 180 Bolognese men-at-arms in reserve. The central division consisted of 492 men-at-arms and 600 mounted crossbowmen under the command of Francesco Gonzaga, while keeping a large contingent of cavalry in reserve. The left wing, commanded by Fortebraccio di Montone, had 352 Venetian men-at-arms supported by cavalry. Also in the center were 4,000 Venetian foot and 1,000 Mantuan infantry, with a contingent of 600 Stradioti on the French left flank.

The French opened with an artillery bombardment, intending to kill as many of their opponents as possible. Then they charged with their heavy cavalry, destroying and scattering the disordered Italian ranks in just minutes. The fight was perhaps more memorable for the ineffectiveness of artillery on either side, other than the psychological effect achieved by the French guns. (Note: The French guns stopped firing due to the rain making the powder wet.) Of the French and Italian casualties, (Note: Paolo Giovio states 4,000 casualties for the League and 1,000 for the French, which Santosuosso believes is more accurate.) one eyewitness estimated that fewer than 10 men were killed by cannon fire.

After the battle, Charles then marched on into Lombardy and returned to France.

== Result ==
Both parties strove to present themselves as the victors in the battle. The battle was reported in Venice as a victory, and was recorded and celebrated as such, which included the capture of Mathieu de Bourbon. Regardless of the self-proclamations of victory by League commanders, Domenico Malipiero recognized that the League failed to stop the French from reaching Asti. Francesco Gonzaga claimed victory and then ordered the portrait of the Madonna della Vittoria, while the Italian historian Francesco Guicciardini's judgement was to award the palm of victory to the French. (Note: If officially Italians celebrated the Battle of Fornovo as a victory – to the surprise of the French – privately, many were not so sure. Guicciardini’s verdict was that ‘general consent awarded the palm to the French’) Privately, Gonzaga confessed to his wife that the battle was a near run thing and that if the French had turned on them, the League's forces would have been destroyed. A week later, Bernardino Fortebraccio spoke to the Venetian senate, stating the League's army could have defeated the French if their troops would have stayed in the battle and left the baggage train alone.

The French had won their battle, fighting off superior numbers and proceeding on their march to Asti. (Note: "Fornovo was clearly a French victory in the sense that Charles achieved his aim of breaking through into Lombardy..") (Note: "Lo storico Piero Pieri ne Il Rinascimento e la crisi militare italiana, non ha dubbi sulla vittoria francese..."(The historian Piero Pieri in The Renaissance and the Italian Military Crisis, has no doubts about the French victory..),"La storiografia fu comunque chiara sulle cause che portarono alla non vittoria dell’esercito italiano, posso affermare che fu una sconfitta, perché l’obbiettivo di Carlo VIII era quello di tornare in patria, cosa che riuscì a fare, magari impaurito, magari fuggendo, ma ci riuscì."("Historians, however, were clear about the reasons that led to the Italian army's failure to win. I can say that it was a defeat, because Charles VIII's goal was to return to his homeland, which he managed to do, perhaps out of fear, perhaps by fleeing, but he succeeded.") (Note: The battle of Fornovo, by which Charles forced his way past the enemy who stood in his path, was not an indecisive action but a definite victory for France.) (Note: Santosuosso states the French had won the battle, both strategically and tactically, but not decisively.) The League took much higher casualties and could not prevent the French army from crossing Italian lands on its way back to France.

== Consequences ==
On the same day as the battle was fought, Ferdinand II appeared before Naples with a Spanish fleet; he re-entered and occupied Naples the following day. He was welcomed with rejoicing by the citizens, as the French had made themselves hated through their behaviour. Pope Alexander VI denounced the French as having committed worse crimes in Italy than had the Goths. Already under threat of excommunication, Charles VIII was ordered to lay down his arms and promote the peace of Christendom by the pope. Alexander also wrote to the Venetians to congratulate them on winning "immortal fame" by their liberation of Italy.

The League's forces were without their German contingent, since Emperor Maximilian I was detained by the Diet of Worms(Reichstag) which had chosen to insist on constitutional reforms promised by Maximilian. Following the French victory at Fornovo, Maximilian emphasized the dangers of Italy under French occupation and attacks from the south. Motivated by the result at Fornovo, the Reichstag agreed to general taxation to raise an army for defense.

Charles left Italy abandoning all his conquests. He attempted in the next few years to rebuild his army, but was hampered by the serious debts incurred by the previous one, and he never succeeded in recouping anything substantive. He died two-and-a-half years after his retreat, of an accident, striking his head while passing through a doorway, he succumbed to a sudden coma several hours later. Charles bequeathed a meagre legacy: he left France in debt and in disarray as a result of an ambition most charitably characterized as unrealistic, and having lost several important provinces that it would take centuries to recover.

However, for Italy the consequences were catastrophic. (Note: In his work, La prima parte dell'historie del suo tempo, Giovio claimed that Italian soldiers were despised following the Leagues' defeat at Fornovo.) Europe knew now, from Charles' expedition, of an enormously rich land, divided into easily conquerable principalities, and defended only by mercenary armies that refused to fight with the slightest disadvantage. Italy was to be the scene of a dispute between the main continental powers, with the result that the Italians were left with only a secondary role in their own destiny. Only Venice, Genoa, the Papal States, Savoy, and Tuscany would survive as independent nations after the end of the Italian Wars, losing however their original power and stability.

== See also ==
- Madonna della Vittoria

== Sources ==
- Birtachas, Stathis (2018). "Stradioti, Cappelletti, Compagnie or Milizie Greche: 'Greek' Mounted and Foot Troops in the Venetian State (Fifteenth to Eighteenth Centuries)". In Theotokis, Georgios; Yıldız, Aysel (eds.). A Military History of the Mediterranean Sea.
- Brigato, Lucia (2014). Fornovo 1485: la vittoriosa sconfitta (PDF) (Master's thesis) (in Italian). Venezia: Universita Ca'Foscari Venezia.
- Devereux, Andrew (2020). The Other Side of Empire: Just War in the Mediterranean and the Rise of Early Modern Spain. Cornell University Press. ISBN 9781501740138.
- Dupuy, Trevor N. (1993). Harper Encyclopedia of Military History. HarperCollins. ISBN 978-0-06-270056-8.
- Kuiper, Kathleen, ed. (2009). The 100 Most Influential Painters & Sculptors of the Renaissance. Britannica Educational Publishing.
- Laffan, R.G.D. (1975). "The Empire under Maximilian I". In Hay, Denys (ed.). The New Cambridge Modern History. Vol. I: The Renaissance, 1493–1520. Cambridge University Press.
- Luzio, Alessandro; Renier, Rodolfo (1890). "Francesco Gonzaga alla Battaglia di Fornovo (1495) Secondo I Documenti Mantovani". Archivio Storico Italiano Serie V (in Italian). 6 (179). Casa Editrice Leo S. Olschki s.r.l.: 205–246.
- Mallett, M. E.; Hale, J. R. (1984). The Military Organisation of a Renaissance State: Venice c. 1400 to 1617. Cambridge studies in early modern history. Cambridge University Press. ISBN 978-0-521-24842-6.
- Mallett, Michael; Shaw, Christine (2012). The Italian Wars 1494–1559. Modern Wars in Perspective. Harlow: Pearson. ISBN 978-0-582-05758-6.
- Malipiero, Domenico (1843). Annali veneti dall'anno 1457 al 1500 (in Italian). Firenze.
- Nicolle, David (2005). Fornovo 1495: France's Bloody Fighting Retreat. Praeger illustrated military history series. Westport Connecticut: Osprey. ISBN 978-0-275-98850-0.
- Nolan, Cathal (2006). The Age Of Wars Of Religion, 1000–1650: An Encyclopedia of Global Warfare and Civilization A-K. Vol. I. Westport Connecticut: Greenwood Press. ISBN 978-0-313-33733-8.
- Oman, Charles (1987). A History of The Art of War in the Sixteenth Century. Stackpole Books.
- Palmer, William (1994). The Problem of Ireland in Tudor Foreign Policy, 1485–1603. Woodbridge: The Boydell Press. ISBN 978-0-85115-562-3.
- Pieri, Piero (1971). Il Rinascimento e la crisi militare italiana (in Italian). G. Einaudi. "Pure ci sembra che non possa esservi dubbio: sia dal punto di vista tattico che da quello strategico, la vittoria spetta ai Francesi.."
- Potter, Philip J. (2012). Monarchs of the Renaissance: The Lives and Reigns of 42 European Kings and Queens. McFarland & Company, Inc. ISBN 978-0786491032.
- Santosuosso, Antonio (1994). "Anatomy of Defeat in Renaissance Italy: The Battle of Fornovo in 1495". The International History Review. 16, No. 2 (May) (2). Taylor & Francis, Ltd.: 221–250. doi:10.1080/07075332.1994.9640674.
- Setton, Kenneth M. (1978). The Papacy and the Levant (1204–1571), Volume II: The Fifteenth Century. Vol. 2. Philadelphia: The American Philosophical Society. ISBN 0-87169-127-2.
- Taylor, Frederick Lewis (1921). The Art of War in Italy 1494–1529: Prince Consort Prize Essay 1920. Cambridge library collection. European History. Cambridge University Press. OCLC 967401725 – via Archive Foundation.
- Theotokis, Georgios; Yıldız, Aysel, eds. (2018). A Military History of the Mediterranean Sea: Aspects of War, Diplomacy, and Military Elites. History of Warfare (118) (e-book ed.). Leiden/Boston: Brill. ISBN 978-90-04-36204-8.
- Tucker, Spencer C. (2010). A Global Chronology of Conflict: From the Ancient World to the Modern Middle East. Vol. I. ABC-CLIO. ISBN 978-1-85109-672-5.
- Watkins, Robert Dorsey (1927). The State as a Party Litigant. The Johns Hopkins University Press.
