= 1553 =

1553 in various calendars
- Gregorian calendar: 1553; MDLIII
- Ab urbe condita: 2306
- Armenian calendar: 1002; ԹՎ ՌԲ
- Assyrian calendar: 6303
- Balinese saka calendar: 1474–1475
- Bengali calendar: 959–960
- Berber calendar: 2503
- English Regnal year: 6 Edw. 6 – 1 Mar. 1
- Buddhist calendar: 2097
- Burmese calendar: 915
- Byzantine calendar: 7061–7062
- Chinese calendar: 壬子年 (Water Rat); 4250 or 4043 — to — 癸丑年 (Water Ox); 4251 or 4044
- Coptic calendar: 1269–1270
- Discordian calendar: 2719
- Ethiopian calendar: 1545–1546
- Hebrew calendar: 5313–5314
- Hindu calendars
- Vikram Samvat: 1609–1610
- Shaka Samvat: 1474–1475
- Kali Yuga: 4653–4654
- Holocene calendar: 11553
- Igbo calendar: 553–554
- Iranian calendar: 931–932
- Islamic calendar: 960–961
- Japanese calendar: Tenbun 22 (天文２２年)
- Javanese calendar: 1471–1472
- Julian calendar: 1553; MDLIII
- Korean calendar: 3886
- Minguo calendar: 359 before ROC 民前359年
- Nanakshahi calendar: 85
- Thai solar calendar: 2095–2096
- Tibetan calendar: ཆུ་ཕོ་བྱི་བ་ལོ་ (male Water-Rat); 1679 or 1298 or 526 — to — ཆུ་མོ་གླང་ལོ་ (female Water-Ox); 1680 or 1299 or 527

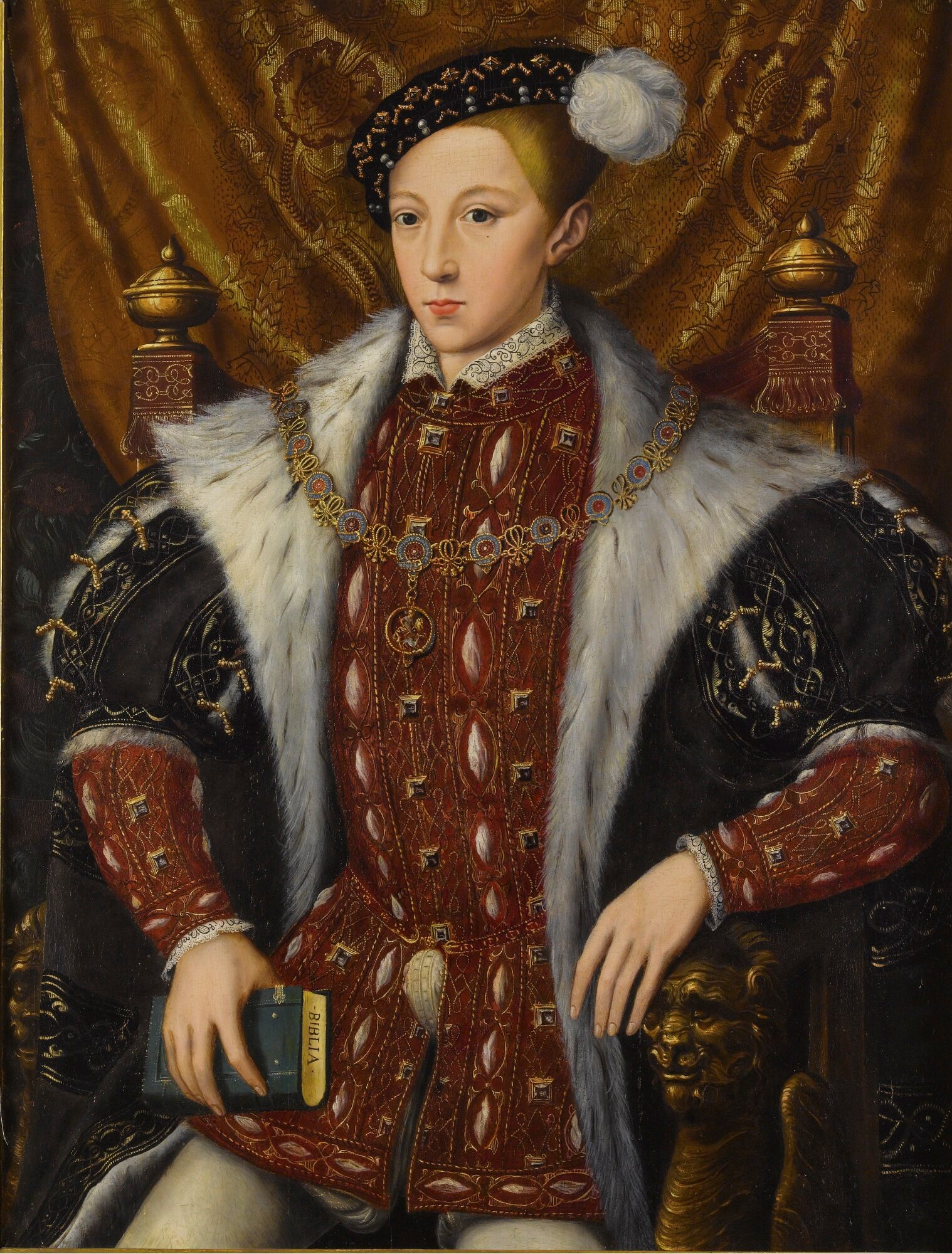
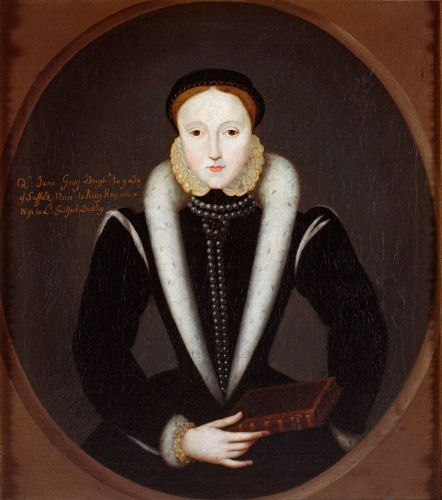
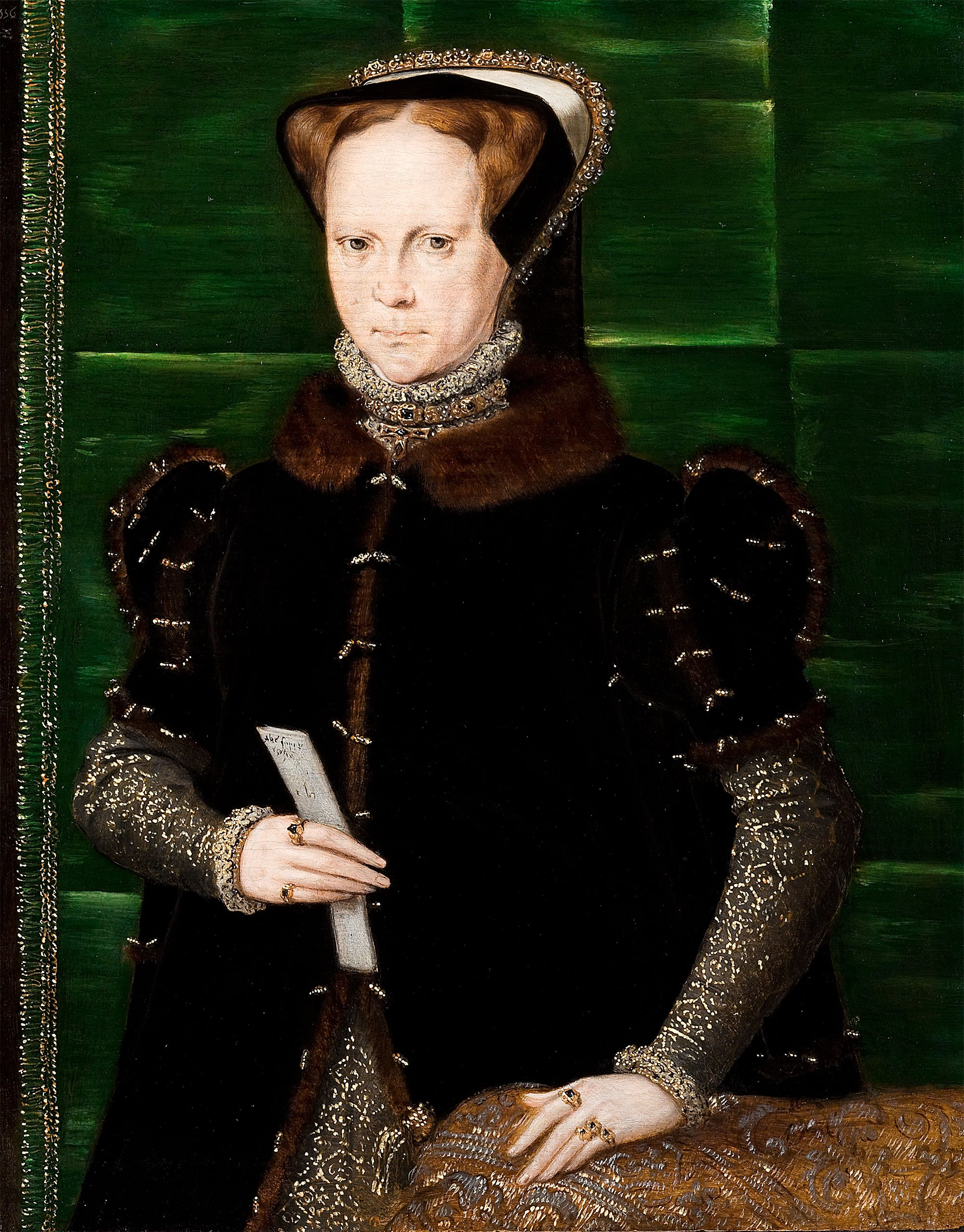
July 1553: England ruled by Edward VI, Jane and Mary I

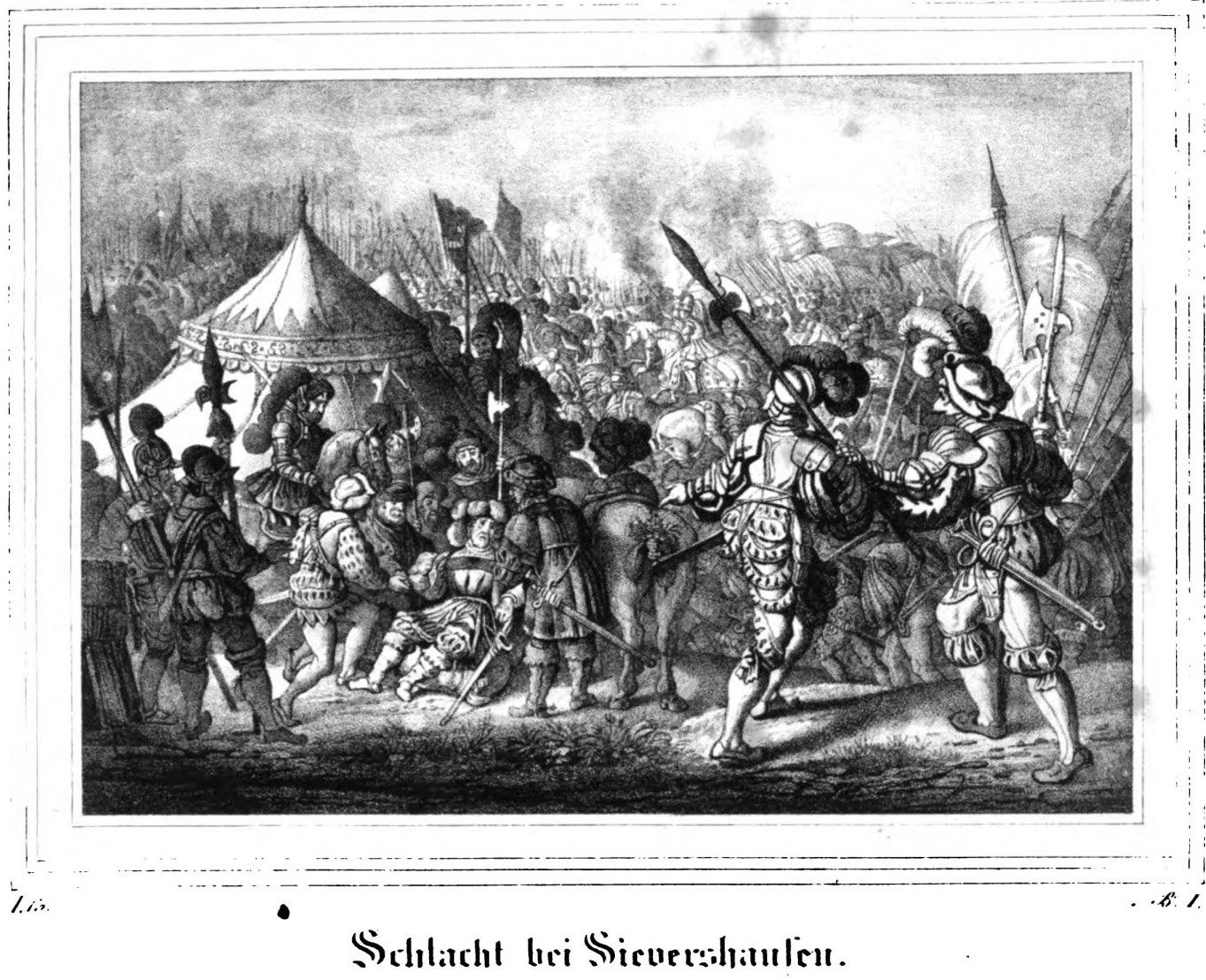
July 9: Battle of Sievershausen

Year 1553 (MDLIII) was a common year starting on Sunday of the Julian calendar.

== Events ==
=== January–March ===
- January 2 – The siege of Metz in France, started by Charles V, Holy Roman Emperor during the Italian War of 1551–59 on October 19 last is lifted after 75 days. During the city's defence by the Duke of Guise and 6,000 soldiers, Charles V had lost two-thirds of his original force of at least 20,000 men.
- February 17 – In India, Timmaraja Wodeyar II becomes the sixth maharaja of the Kingdom of Mysore (a vassal state of the Vijayanagara Empire), after the death of his father, the Maharaja Chamaraja Wodeyar III.
- February 21 – Lieutenant General Luis Álvarez de Toledo y Osorio temporarily serves as the Spanish Viceroy of Naples (in modern-day Italy) upon the death of his father, Pedro Álvarez de Toledo. Luis steps down after Pedro Pacheco de Villena is appointed as the new Viceroy in June.
- March 1 – The second (and last) session of the Parliament of England during the reign of King Edward VI is opened by the King at Westminster and lasts until March 31. Sir James Dyer serves during the session as Speaker of the House of Commons.

=== April–June ===
- April 28 – Shimun VIII Yohannan Sulaqa, leader of the Chaldean Catholic Church in modern-day Iraq, is recognized by Pope Julius III as the Patriarch of Mosul.
- May 12 – St Albans, in England, receives its first royal charter as a borough.
- May 25 – Lady Jane Grey, a 16-year-old first cousin of King Edward VI of England, marries Lord Guildford Dudley, son of the Duke of Northumberland, who has engineered the marriage.
- June 3 – The first of the five Battles of Kawanakajima, the "Battle of the Fuse," commences in Japan between Takeda Shingen of Kai Province and Uesugi Kenshin of Echigo Province. The clash, fought 12 days after Shingen has taken Katsurao Castle, takes place at a shrine of Hachiman (near modern-day Yashiro, Hyōgo prefecture), is part of a major series of conflicts during the Japanese Sengoku period.
- June 15 – On his deathbed, King Edward summons prominent English judges and signs his devise of the throne to Lady Jane Grey.
- June 21 – Under threats from the Duke of Northumberland, the devise by King Edward to make Jane Grey the heir to the throne is signed by over 100 prominent persons.
- June 26 – Two new schools, Christ's Hospital and King Edward's School, Witley, are created by royal charter in accordance with the will of King Edward VI of England; St Thomas' Hospital, London, in existence since the 12th century, is named in the same charter.

=== July–September ===
- July 6 – King Edward VI of England dies at the age of 15 after a reign of only six years.
- July 9 – Battle of Sievershausen: Prince-elector Maurice of Saxony defeats the Catholic forces of Margrave Albert of Brandenburg-Kulmbach. Maurice is mortally wounded.
- July 10 – Four days after the death of her cousin King Edward VI, Lady Jane Grey is proclaimed Queen of England – a position she holds for the next nine days.
- July 19 – The Lord Mayor of London proclaims Mary I the rightful Queen, following a change of allegiance by the Privy Council; Lady Jane Grey voluntarily abdicates.
- August 3 – Queen Mary I of England arrives in London from East Anglia.
- August 18 – John Dudley, 1st Duke of Northumberland, is tried and convicted of treason for his role in putting his daughter-in-law, Lady Jane Grey, on the throne.
- August 24 – English explorer Richard Chancellor enters the White Sea and reaches Arkhangelsk. He goes on afterwards to the court of Ivan the Terrible of Russia, opening up trade between England and Russia.
- September 23 – The Sadians consolidate their power in Morocco, by defeating the last of their enemies.
- September – Anglican bishops in England are arrested, and Roman Catholic bishops are restored.

=== October–December ===
- October 6 – Şehzade Mustafa, oldest son of Suleiman the Magnificent, is executed in Konya by order of his father.
- October 27 – Geneva's governing council burns Michael Servetus at the stake as a heretic.
- November 13 – Lady Jane Grey, who had claimed the title of Queen of England for nine days, is convicted of high treason, along with her husband Lord Guilford Dudley, two of Dudley's brothers, and Thomas Cranmer, the former Archbishop of Canterbury, after trial conducted by a special commission at Guildhall in the City of London. Referred to by the court as "Jane Dudley, wife of Guildford", Lady Jane is found to have treacherously assumed the title and the power of the monarch of England, as evidenced by a number of documents she had signed as "Jane the Quene". All five defendants are sentenced to death. Beheading is the sentence for the men, while Lady Jane is to either be "burned alive on Tower Hill or beheaded as the Queen pleases", with the decision (for a private decapitation) to be made by Queen Mary.
- November 16 – A delegation from the English Parliament formally asks the new queen, Mary I, to choose an English husband rather than to marry Spain's Prince Philip, and suggests Edward Courtenay, 1st Earl of Devon. Queen Mary's choice to marry Philip, in the interests of protecting England from an invasion, will ultimately lead to Wyatt's rebellion.
- November 17 (13th waxing of Natdaw 915 ME) – Bayinnaung, King of Burma, commissions the building of the Kanbawzathadi Palace in his capital, Pegu (modern-day Bago in Myanmar). The palace is completed in 1556 but is burned down in 1599.
- November 25 – Italian War of 1551–1559: Cosimo I de' Medici, Duke of the Florentine Republic, signs a secret treaty with Charles V, Holy Roman Emperor to conquer the Republic of Siena to bring it back into the Empire.
- November 25 – Second Margrave War: The city of Kulmbach, near Brandenburg in Bavaria in Germany, is sacked and burned to the ground after its margrave, Albert Alcibiades, makes an unsuccessful attempt to bring all of the Duchy of Franconia under his control.
- December 25 – Battle of Tucapel: Mapuche rebels under Lautaro defeat the Spanish conquistadors, and execute Pedro de Valdivia, the first Royal Governor of Chile.

=== Date unknown ===
- Tonbridge School is founded by Sir Andrew Judde, under letters patent of Edward VI of England.
- The xiii Bukes of Eneados of the famose Poete Virgill, the first complete translation of any major work of classical antiquity into one of the English languages, is published in London.
- In Ming dynasty China:
  - The addition of a new section of the Outer City fortifications is completed in southern Beijing, bringing the overall size of Beijing to 18 square miles (4662 hectares).
  - Shanghai is fortified for the first time.

== Births ==
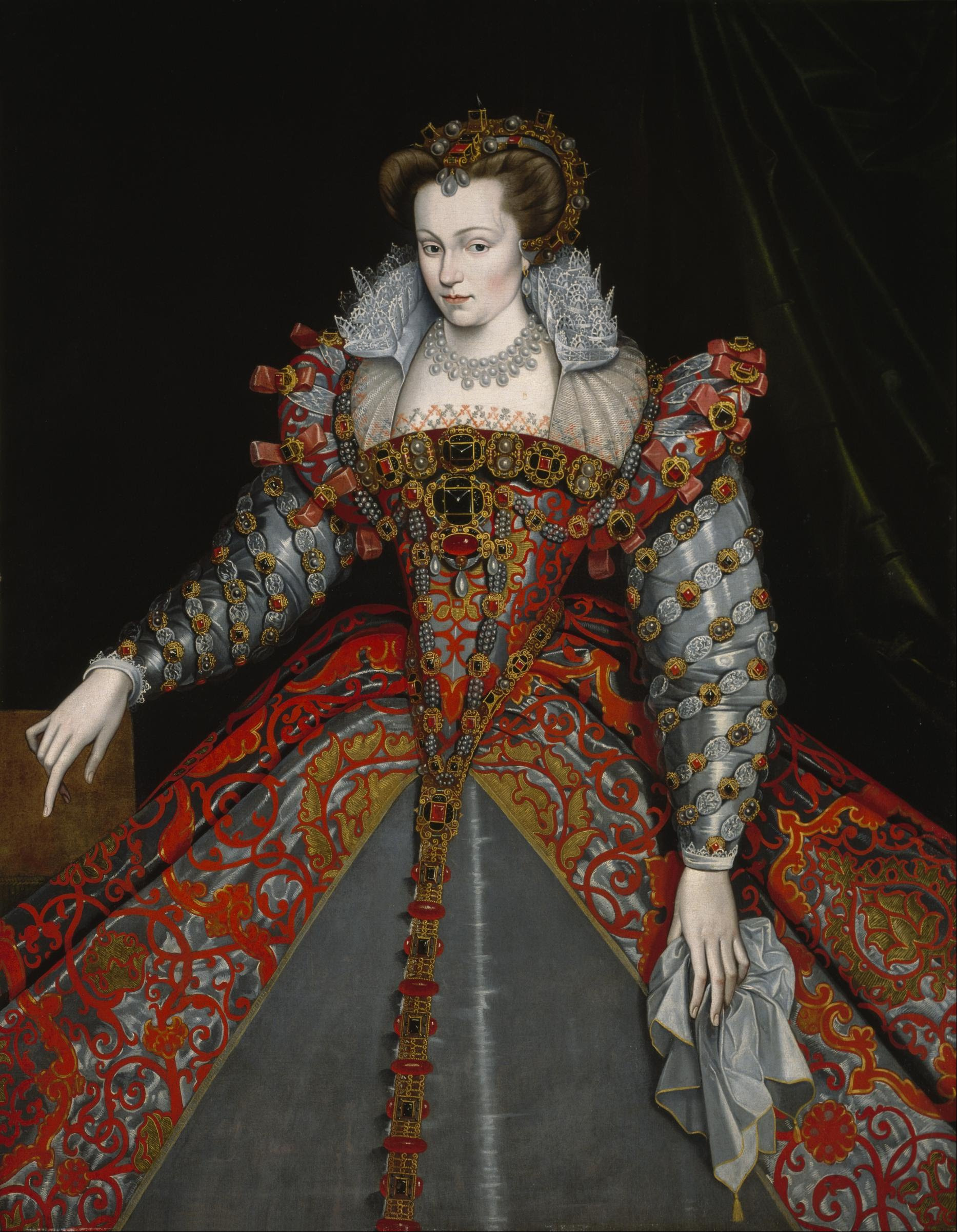
Louise of Lorraine

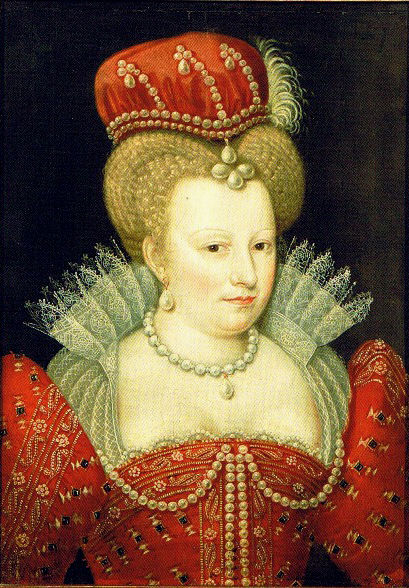
Margaret of Valois

- January 20 – Bernardino de Cárdenas y Portugal, Duque de Maqueda, Spanish noble (d. 1601)
- January 22 – Mōri Terumoto, Japanese warrior (d. 1625)
- February 24 – Cherubino Alberti, Italian engraver and painter (d. 1615)
- March – Eleonora di Garzia di Toledo, Italian noble (d. 1576)
- March 26 – Vitsentzos Kornaros, Greek writer (d. 1613)
- April 24 – John Maxwell, 8th Lord Maxwell, Scottish noble (d. 1593)
- April 30 – Louise of Lorraine, French queen consort (d. 1601)
- May 7 – Albert Frederick, Duke of Prussia (d. 1618)
- May 14 – Margaret of Valois, Queen of France (d. 1615)
- June 5 – Bernardino Baldi, Italian mathematician and writer (d. 1617)
- June 15 – Archduke Ernest of Austria, Austrian prince, the son of Maximilian II (d. 1595)
- July 1 – Peter Street, English carpenter (d. 1609)
- September 26 – Nicolò Contarini, Doge of Venice (d. 1631)
- October 8 – Jacques Auguste de Thou, French historian (d. 1617)
- October 18 – Luca Marenzio, Italian composer (d. 1599)
- November 2 – Magdalene of Jülich-Cleves-Berg, Countess Palatine of Pfalz-Zweibrücken (d. 1633)
- November 4 – Roger Wilbraham, Solicitor-General for Ireland (d. 1616)
- November 23 – Prospero Alpini, Italian physician and botanist (d. 1617)
- November 28 – George More, English politician (d. 1632)
- December 13 – King Henry IV of France (d. 1610)
- date unknown
  - Patriarch Filaret of Moscow and All Rus' (d. 1633)
  - Giovanni Florio, English writer and translator (d. 1625)
  - Richard Hakluyt, English travel writer (d. 1616)
  - Robert Hues, English mathematician and geographer (d. 1632)
  - Amago Katsuhisa, Japanese nobleman (d. 1578)
  - Pierre de Rostegny, French jurist (d. 1631)
  - William Russell, 1st Baron Russell of Thornhaugh, English military leader (d. 1613)
  - Moses Székely, Hungarian noble (d. 1603)
  - Beatrice Michiel, Venetian spy (d. 1613)
  - Mirza Muhammad Hakim, son of Mughal emperor Humayun and brother of emperor Akbar (d. 1585)

== Deaths ==
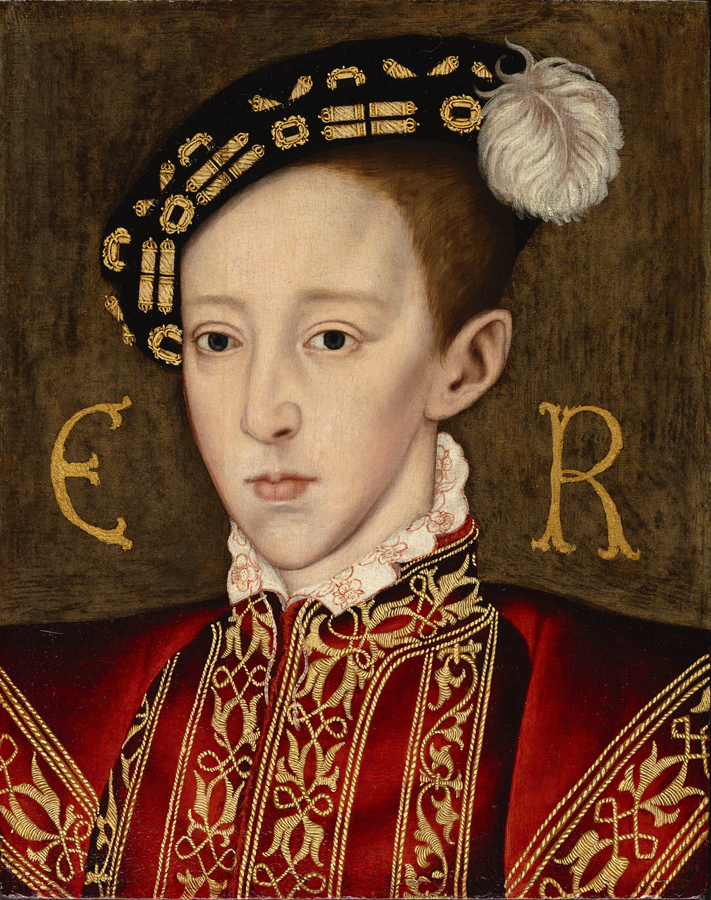
Edward VI of England

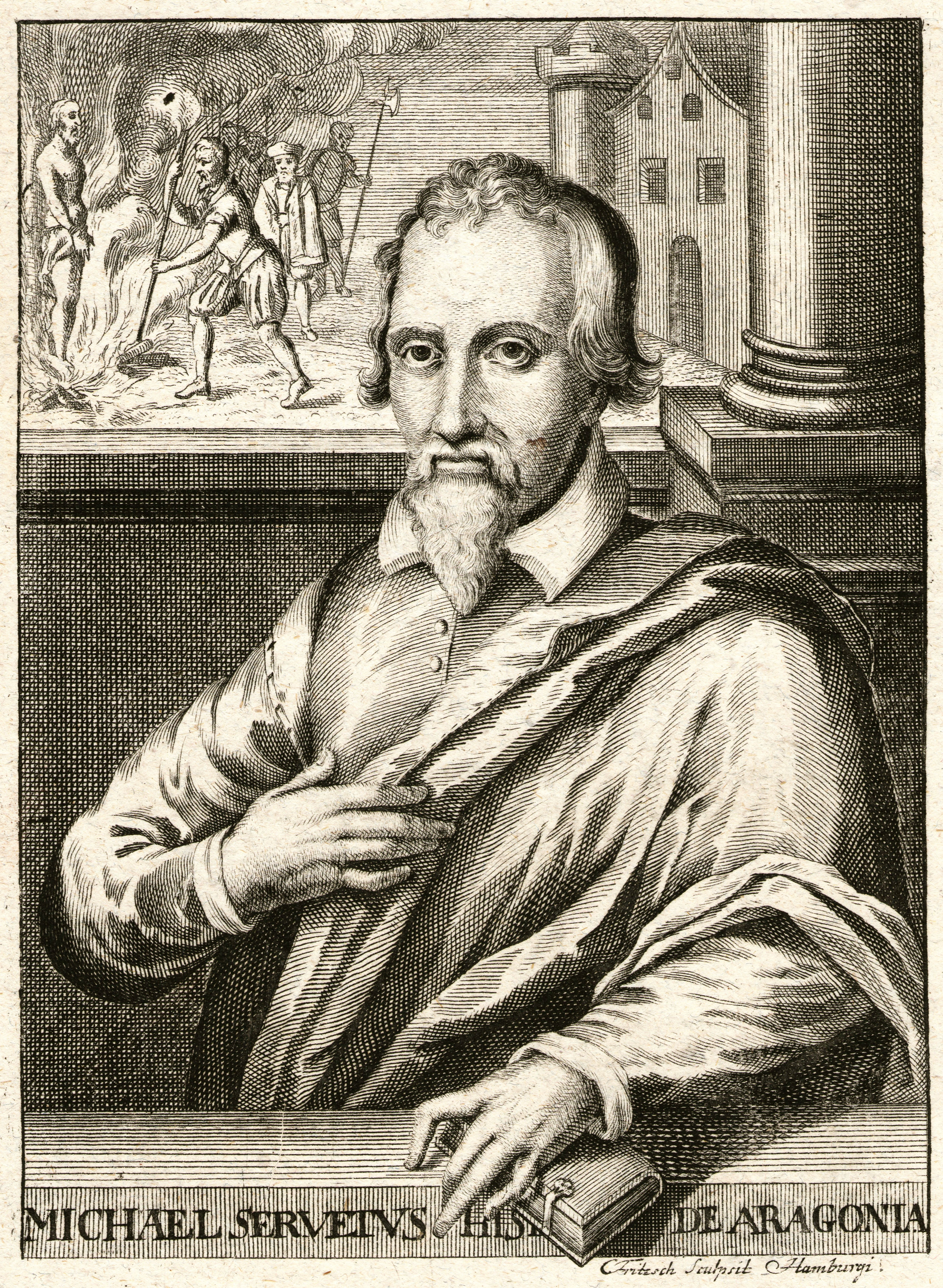
Michael Servetus

- January 13 – Duke George II of Münsterberg-Oels, Count of Glatz (b. 1512)
- February 4 – Caspar Othmayr, German Protestant priest, theologian and composer (b. 1515)
- February 6 – Ernest, Margrave of Baden-Durlach (b. 1482)
- February 8 – John Ernest, Duke of Saxe-Coburg, (b. 1521)
- February 17 – Chamaraja Wodeyar III, King of Mysore (b. 1492)
- February 19 – Erasmus Reinhold, German astronomer and mathematician (b. 1511)
- February 25 – Hirate Masahide, Japanese diplomat and tutor of Oda Nobunaga (suicide) (b. 1492)
- April – Minkhaung of Prome, last king of Prome in Burma (Myanmar)
- April 9 – François Rabelais, French writer
- May 5 – Erasmus Alberus, German humanist (b. 1500)
- May 28 – Johannes Aal, Swiss theologian (b. 1500)
- June 26 – Tsarevich Dmitry Ivanovich of Russia, Grand Prince of Moscow (b. 1552)
- July 6 – King Edward VI of England (b. 1537)
- July 9 – Maurice, Elector of Saxony (b. 1521)
- July 16 – Bernardino Maffei, Catholic cardinal (b. 1514)
- August 6 – Girolamo Fracastoro, Italian physician (b. 1478)
- August 17 – Duke Charles III of Savoy (b. 1486)
- August 22 – John Dudley, 1st Duke of Northumberland (b. 1502; executed)
- September 6 – Juan de Homedes y Coscon, 47th Grandmaster of the Knights Hospitaller (b. c. 1477)
- October 6 – Şehzade Mustafa, Suleiman the Magnificent's first-born son by Mahidevran Hatun (b. 1515)
- October 7 – Cristóbal de Morales, Spanish composer (b. 1500)
- October 16 – Lucas Cranach the Elder, German painter (b. 1472)
- October 17 – George III, Prince of Anhalt-Dessau, German prince (b. 1507)
- October 27 – Michael Servetus, Spanish Protestant theologian (burned at the stake) (b. 1511)
- October 28 – Giovanni Salviati, Italian Catholic cardinal (b. 1490)
- October 30 – Jacob Sturm von Sturmeck, German statesman and reformer (b. 1489)
- November 15 – Lucrezia de' Medici, Italian noblewoman (b. 1470)
- November 23 – Sebastiano Antonio Pighini, Italian cardinal (b. 1500)
- November 27 – Şehzade Cihangir, Ottoman prince (b. 1531)
- December 3 – Ludwig of Hanau-Lichtenberg, German nobleman (b. 1487)
- December 25 – Pedro de Valdivia, Spanish conquistador (b. 1497)
- date unknown
  - George Joye, English Protestant Bible translator (b. c. 1495)
  - Gunilla Bese, Finnish noble and fiefholder (b. 1475)
