= 1492 =

1492 in various calendars
- Gregorian calendar: 1492; MCDXCII
- Ab urbe condita: 2245
- Armenian calendar: 941; ԹՎ ՋԽԱ
- Assyrian calendar: 6242
- Balinese saka calendar: 1413–1414
- Bengali calendar: 898–899
- Berber calendar: 2442
- English Regnal year: 7 Hen. 7 – 8 Hen. 7
- Buddhist calendar: 2036
- Burmese calendar: 854
- Byzantine calendar: 7000–7001
- Chinese calendar: 辛亥年 (Metal Pig); 4189 or 3982 — to — 壬子年 (Water Rat); 4190 or 3983
- Coptic calendar: 1208–1209
- Discordian calendar: 2658
- Ethiopian calendar: 1484–1485
- Hebrew calendar: 5252–5253
- Hindu calendars
- Vikram Samvat: 1548–1549
- Shaka Samvat: 1413–1414
- Kali Yuga: 4592–4593
- Holocene calendar: 11492
- Igbo calendar: 492–493
- Iranian calendar: 870–871
- Islamic calendar: 897–898
- Japanese calendar: Entoku 4 / Meiō 1 (明応元年)
- Javanese calendar: 1409–1410
- Julian calendar: 1492; MCDXCII
- Korean calendar: 3825
- Minguo calendar: 420 before ROC 民前420年
- Nanakshahi calendar: 24
- Thai solar calendar: 2034–2035
- Tibetan calendar: ལྕགས་མོ་ཕག་ལོ་ (female Iron-Boar); 1618 or 1237 or 465 — to — ཆུ་ཕོ་བྱི་བ་ལོ་ (male Water-Rat); 1619 or 1238 or 466

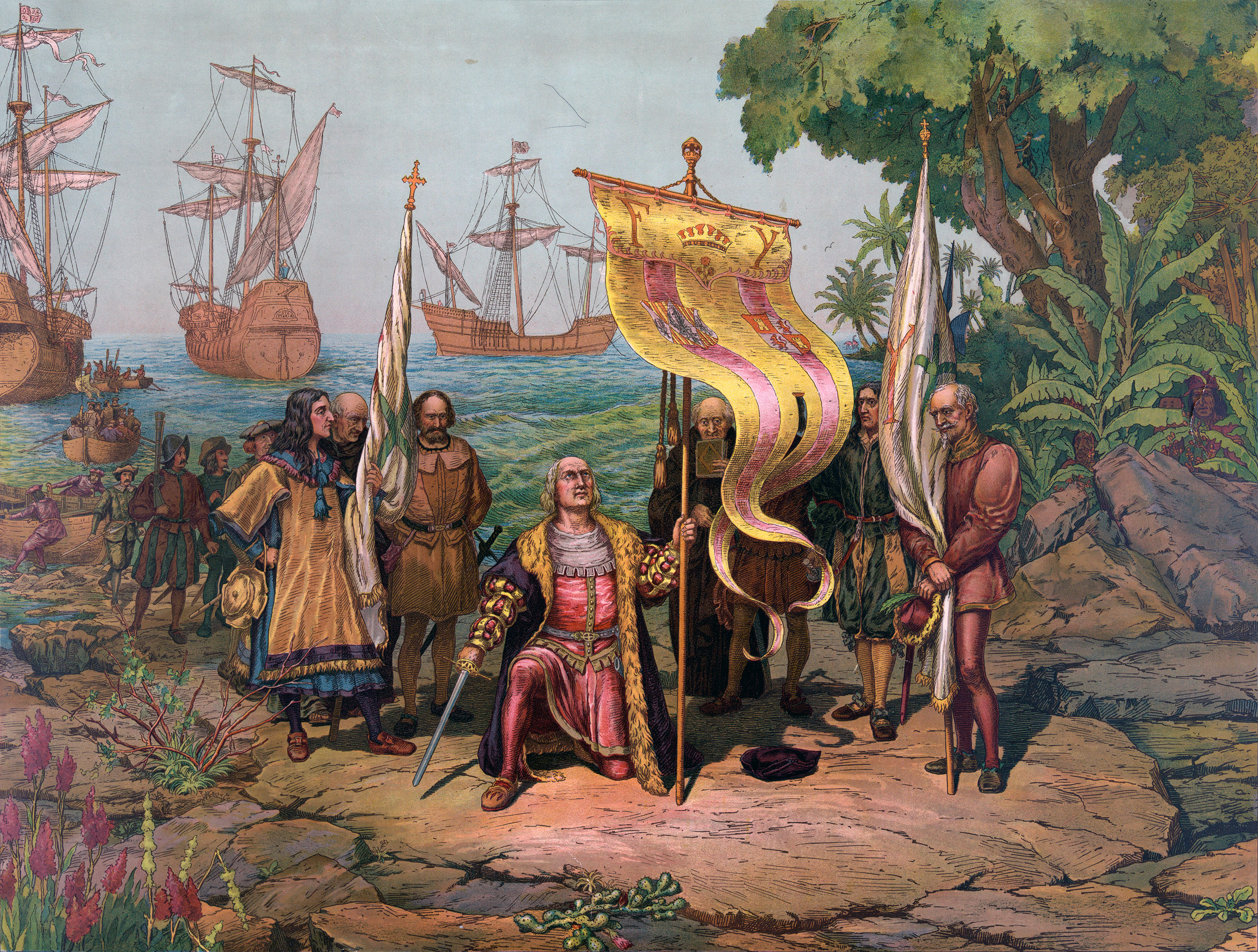
October 12 – Christopher Columbus arrives in the Americas from Spain.

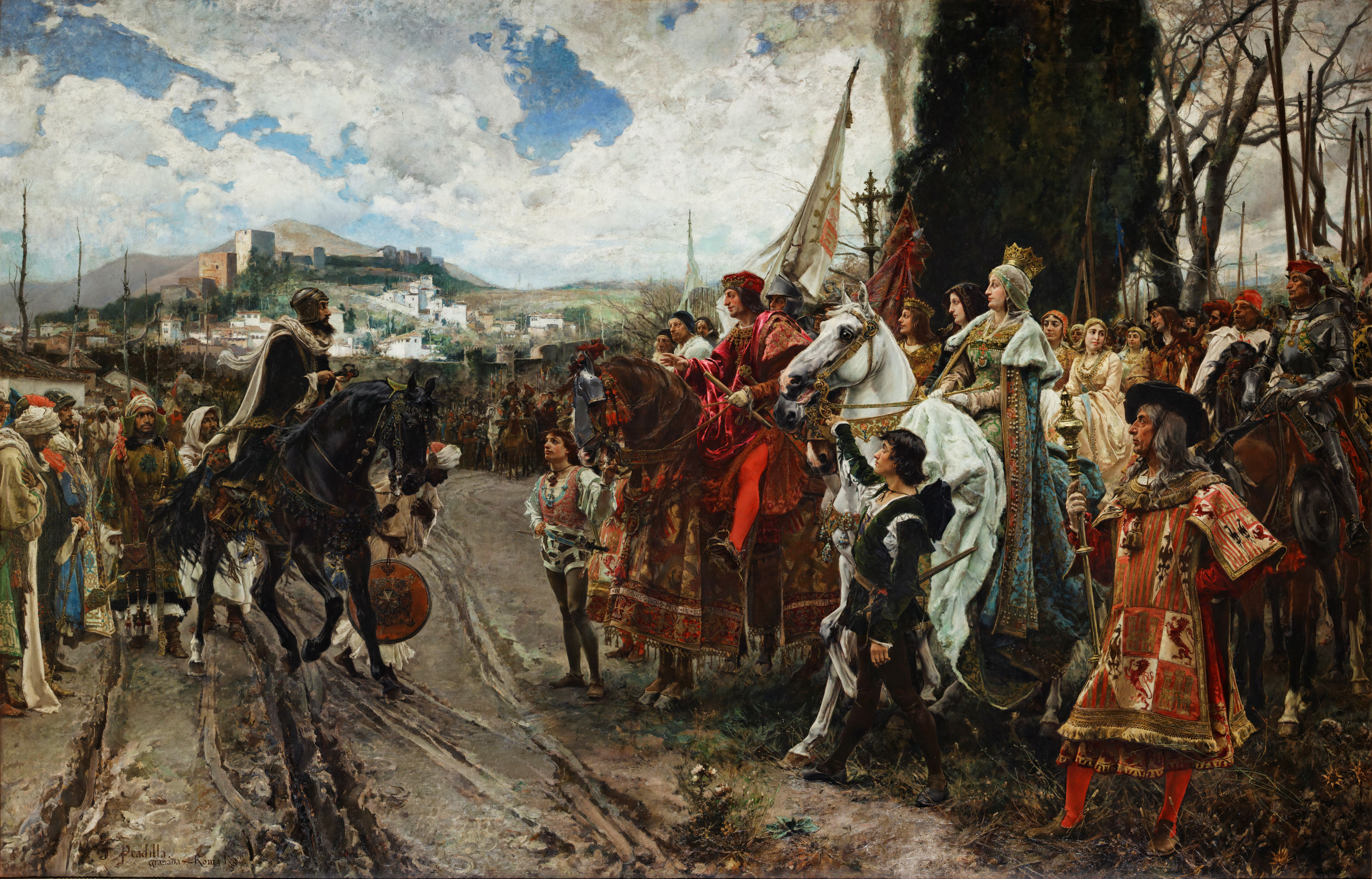
January 2 – Muhammad XI, last Moorish Emir of Granada, surrenders his city to the army of Ferdinand II of Aragon and Isabella I of Castile.

Year 1492 (MCDXCII) is a leap year starting on Sunday of the Julian calendar.

The year 1492 marked a significant milestone in world history, with the beginning of the discovery of the "New World" of the Americas, and the "Old World" in Europe, as well as the unification of Spain, the end of Islamic rule in Western Europe, and the expulsion of the Jewish people from Spain.

== Events ==
=== January—March ===
- January 2 – Fall of Granada: Muhammad XI, the last Emir of Granada, surrenders his city to the army of the Catholic Monarchs (Ferdinand II of Aragon and Isabella I of Castile) after a lengthy siege, ending the ten-year Granada War and the centuries-long Reconquista, and bringing an end to 780 years of Muslim control in Al-Andalus.
- January 6 – Ferdinand and Isabella enter Granada.
- January 15 – Christopher Columbus meets Ferdinand and Isabella at the Alcázar de los Reyes Cristianos in Córdoba, Andalusia, and persuades them to support his Atlantic voyage intended to find a new route to the East Indies.
- January 16 – Antonio de Nebrija publishes Gramática de la lengua castellana, the first grammar text for the Castilian Spanish language, in Salamanca, which he introduces to the Catholic Monarchs, Isabella I of Castile and Ferdinand II of Aragon, newly restored to power in Andalusia, as "a tool of empire".
- January 23 – The Soncino Bible, which includes the Pentateuch, Song of Songs, Ruth, Lamentations, Ecclesiastes, and Esther is printed.
- February 1 – The Titulus Crucis relic is discovered, during the renovation of Santa Croce in Gerusalemme Church in Rome.
- March 31 – Ferdinand and Isabella sign the Alhambra Decree, expelling all Jews from Spain unless they convert to Roman Catholicism.

=== April—June ===
- April 17 – The Capitulations of Santa Fe are signed between Christopher Columbus and the Crown of Castile, agreeing on arrangements for his forthcoming voyage.
- May 3 – In the Canary Islands, the Spanish conquistador Alonso Fernandez de Lugo finishes the conquest of the island of La Palma by capturing Tanausu, King of the native Guanches.
- May 23 – At the shipbuilding town of Palos de la Frontera in Spain, an April 30 decree of Queen Isabella of Castile and King Ferdinand of Aragon is read aloud to the residents, directing that two ships are to be delivered to Christopher Columbus and people chosen by the Pinzon brothers will be required to travel on the voyage westward "by command of Their Highnesses").
- May 31 – Pope Innocent VIII and members of the College of Cardinals meet at the church of Santa Maria del Popolo in Rome with diplomatic envoys sent by the Ottoman Sultan Bayezid II. The envoys present the Pope a gift, said to be the Holy Lance, from the Sultan, along with the Sultan's proposal, payment of 120,000 crowns of gold and an annual subsidy of 45,000 ducats in return for the continued imprisonment of Cem Sultan, a half-brother of Bayezid and a rival claimant to the throne.
- June 7 – Casimir IV Jagiellon, of the Jagiellon Royal House, dies, ending his reign over Poland and Lithuania.
- June 8 – Elizabeth Woodville, the last living Yorkist queen consort, dies in England.

=== July—September ===
- July 25 – Pope Innocent VIII, leader of the Roman Catholic Church since 1484, dies at the age of 59 from catarrh.
- July 30 – Alexander Jagiellon is crowned as Grand Duke of Lithuania.
- August 2 – The Jews are expelled from Spain on the Tisha B'Av fast day, pursuant to the Alhambra Decree. More than 40,000 and perhaps as many as 200,000 leave. Sultan Bayezid II of the Ottoman Empire, learning of this, dispatches the Ottoman Navy to bring the Jews safely to Ottoman lands, mainly to the cities of Thessaloniki (in modern-day Greece) and İzmir (in modern-day Turkey); others settle in Sarajevo.
- August 3 – The Genoese navigator Christopher Columbus sails with three ships (Niña, Pinta and Santa María) from Palos de la Frontera, in the service of the Crown of Castile, on his first voyage across the Atlantic Ocean, intending to reach Asia.
- August 8 – The papal conclave, the first to be held in the Sistine Chapel, begins balloting with 23 of the 27 members of the College of Cardinals in attendance. With 16 votes needed for the required two-thirds majority, the first ballot is split among three candidates, with Oliviero Carafa receiving 9, Rodrigo Borja 7 and Giuliano della Rovere 5, while two cast a blank vote.
- August 11 – Cardinal Rodrigo Borja is unanimously elected on the fourth ballot of the papal conclave, and takes the name of Pope Alexander VI, 214th pope of the Roman Catholic Church.
- September 6 – Christopher Columbus sails from La Gomera in the Canary Islands, his final port of call before crossing the Atlantic Ocean for the first time.
- September 23 – Jan I Olbracht is crowned as King of Poland, more than three months after the death of his father, King Casimir IV.

=== October—December ===
- October 3 – The English army besieges Boulogne.
- October 7 – The Columbus expedition, having seen no land for 29 days while sailing westward, and with some of its sailors threatening to mutiny, spots large flocks of birds, confirming that land is ahead. Christopher Columbus orders a change of course to follow the flight direction of the birds.
- October 10 – The day before sighting land for the first time in a month, Columbus quells an attempt at mutiny by sailors who demand that he turn the Niña around to sail back to Spain.
- October 12 – Believing he has reached the East Indies, Christopher Columbus and his expedition of three ships make landfall in the Caribbean and land on the island of Guanahani, now part of the Bahamas. He names the island "San Salvador". Earlier in the day, sailor Rodrigo de Triana on the Pinta had become the first person to spot land. Because of his belief that he is in the East Indies, Columbus refers to the natives as "indios".
- October 28 – Christopher Columbus lands in what is now the Holguín Province of the island of Cuba.
- November 3 – The Peace of Étaples is signed between England and France, ending French support for Perkin Warbeck, the pretender to the English throne. All English-held territory in France (with the exception of Calais) is returned to France.
- November 6 – In what is now the West African nation of Mali, Sonni Baru becomes the new monarch of the Songhai Empire following death of his father, the Emperor Sonni Ali.
- November 7 – The Ensisheim meteorite, a 127 kg (280 lb) meteorite, lands in a wheat field near the village of Ensisheim in Alsace.
- November 10 – The Catholic Monarchs of Spain issue an Ordinance legalizing the return of Sephardi Jews who had been expelled in August and the terms for remaining. In both cases, all need a baptism as Christian converts in the Roman Catholic church.
- December 5 – Christopher Columbus becomes the first European to set foot on the island of Hispaniola in present day northwestern Haiti.
- December 25 – Columbus' ship Santa María runs aground off Cap-Haïtien in present day Haiti, and is abandoned. The local chief, Guacanagaríx, allows 39 men of Columbus' crew to remain on the island after his departure.

=== Unknown dates ===
- Martin Behaim constructs the first surviving globe of Earth, the Erdapfel. As Columbus would only return from his voyage in 1493, this globe does not show the New World yet.
- The first arboretum to be designed and planted is the Arboretum Trsteno, near Dubrovnik in current-day Croatia.
- Russians build the Ivangorod Fortress, on the eastern banks of the Narva River.
- In Ming dynasty China, the commercial transportation of grain to the northern border, in exchange for salt certificates, is monetized.
- Ermysted's Grammar School, Skipton, North Yorkshire, is founded.
- Marsilio Ficino publishes his translation and commentary of Plotinus.
- Stiegl brewery first recorded in Salzburg.

== Births ==
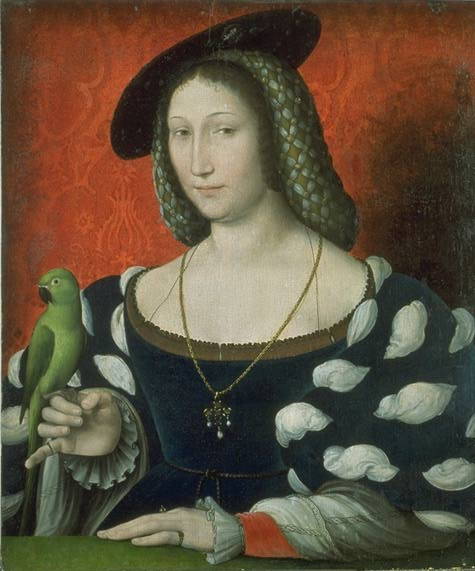
Queen Marguerite de Navarre

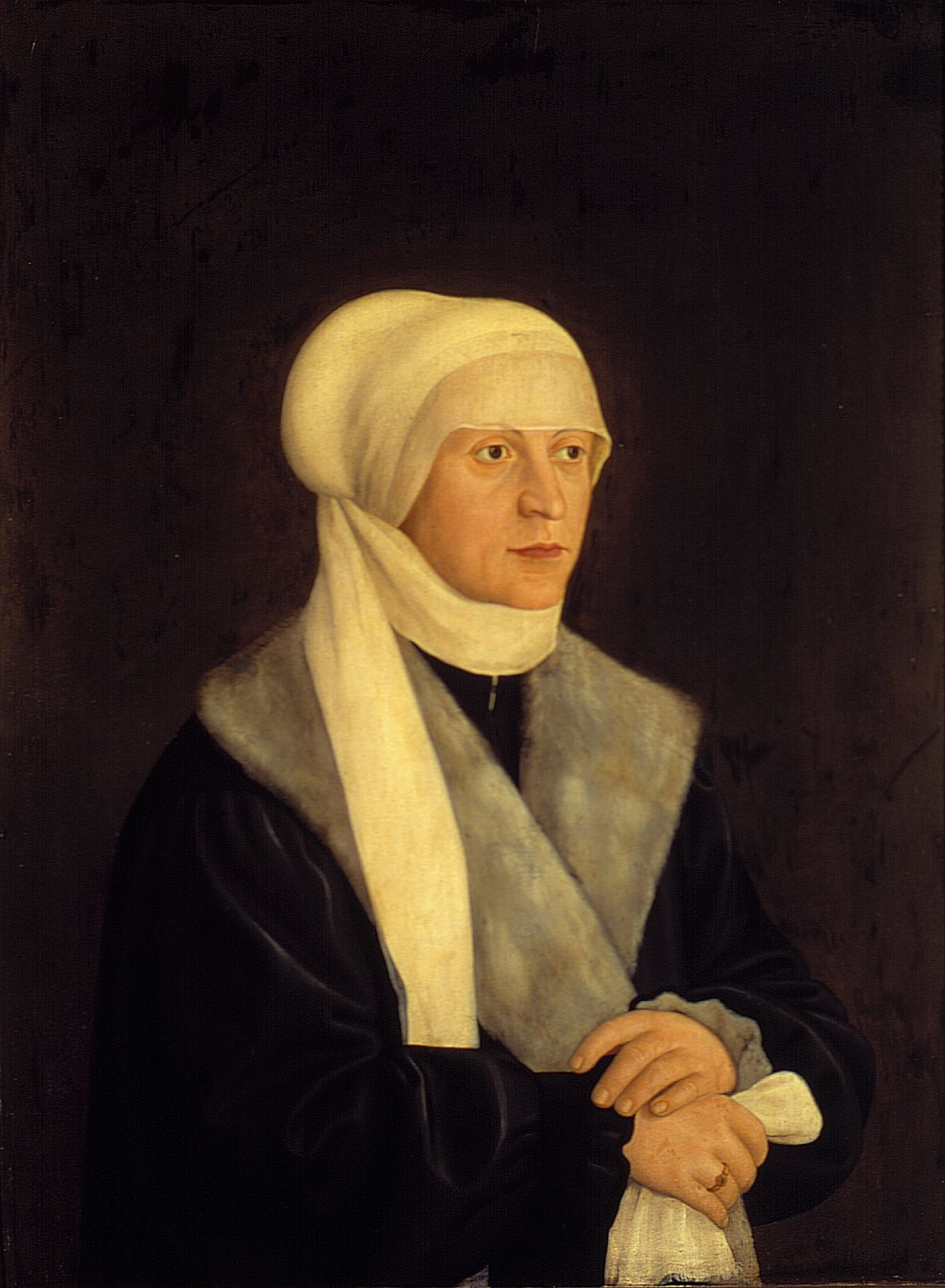
Duchess Sabina of Bavaria

- January 22 – Beatrix of Baden, Margravine of Baden, Countess Palatine consort of Simmern (d. 1535)
- March 4 – Francesco de Layolle, Italian composer (d. c. 1540)
- March 21 – John II, Count Palatine of Simmern, Count Palatine of Simmern (1509-1557) (d. 1557)
- March 27 – Adam Ries, German mathematician (d. 1559)
- April 4 – Ambrosius Blarer, influential reformer in southern Germany and north-eastern Switzerland (d. 1564)
- April 6 – Maud Green, English noble (d. 1531)
- April 11 – Marguerite de Navarre, queen of Henry II of Navarre (d. 1549)
- April 20 – Pietro Aretino, Italian author (d. 1556)
- April 24 – Duchess Sabina of Bavaria (d. 1564)
- May 8 – Andrea Alciato, Italian jurist and writer (d. 1550)
- June 4 – Hirate Masahide, Japanese retainer and tutor of Oda Nobunaga (d. 1553)
- August 1 – Wolfgang, Prince of Anhalt-Köthen, German prince (d. 1566)
- August 8 – Matteo Tafuri, Italian alchemist (d. 1582)
- September 12 – Lorenzo de' Medici, Duke of Urbino (d. 1519)
- September 29 – Chamaraja Wodeyar III, King of Mysore (d. 1553)
- October 1 – Georg Rörer, German theologian (d. 1557)
- October 11 – Charles Orlando, Dauphin of France, French noble (d. 1495)
- October 30 – Anne d'Alençon, French noblewoman (d. 1562)
- November 12 – Johan Rantzau, German general (d. 1565)
- November 27 – Donato Giannotti, Italian writer (d. 1573)
- date unknown
  - Argula von Grumbach, German Protestant reformer (d. 1554)
  - Berchtold Haller, Swiss reformer (d. 1536)
  - Amago Kunihisa, Japanese nobleman (d. 1554)
  - Giacomo Aconcio, Italian pioneer of religious tolerance (d. 1566)
  - Edward Wotton, English physician and zoologist (d. 1555)
- probable
  - Thomas Manners, 1st Earl of Rutland (d. 1543)
  - Fernán Pérez de Oliva, Spanish man of letters (d. 1531)
  - Polidoro da Caravaggio, Italian painter (d. 1543)
  - Bernal Díaz del Castillo, Spanish historian (d. 1584)

== Deaths ==
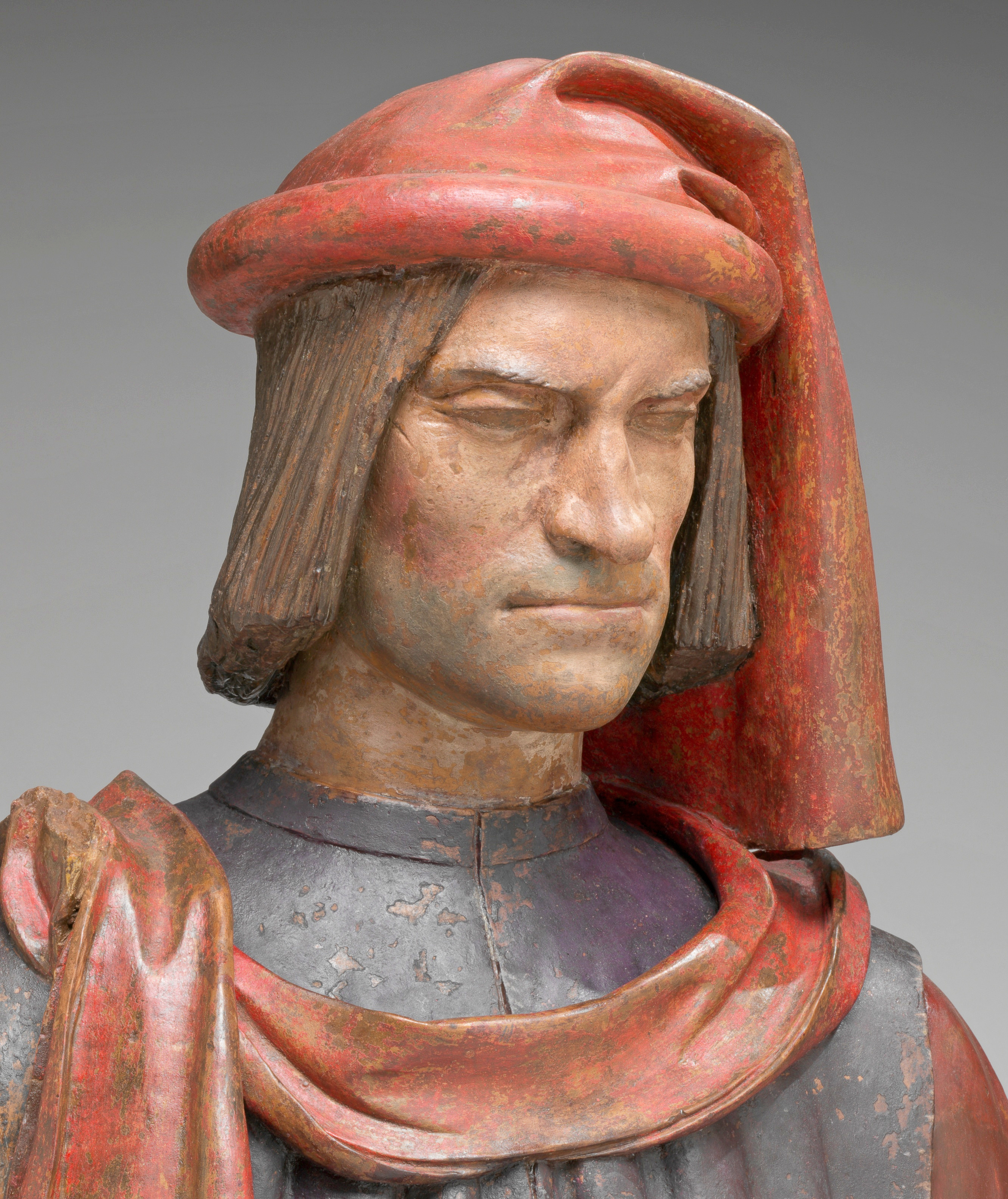
Lorenzo de' Medici

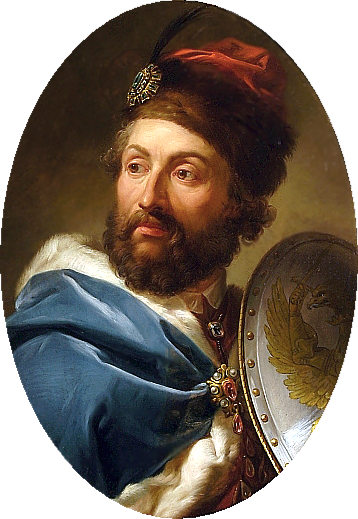
King Casimir IV Jagiellon

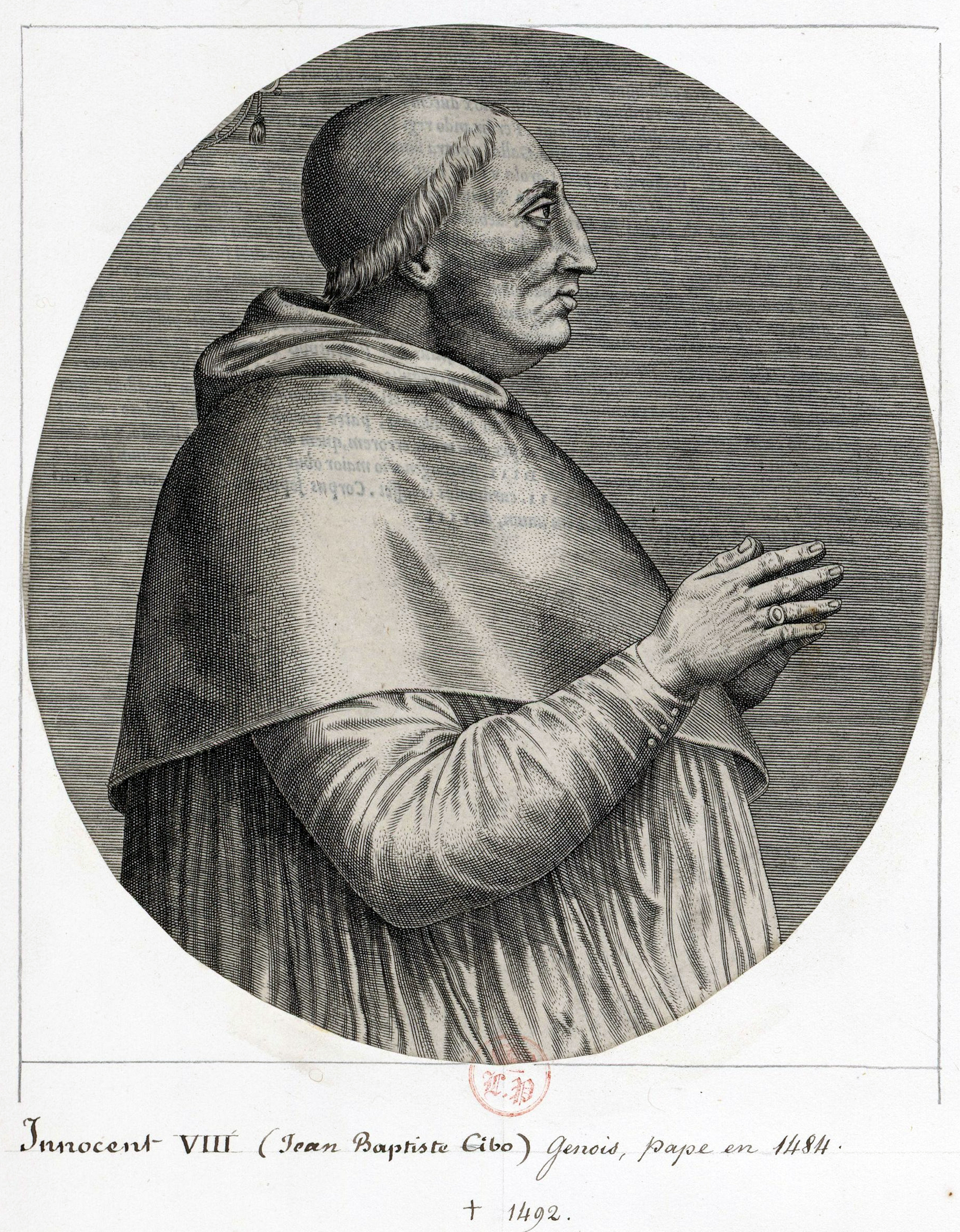
Pope Innocent VIII

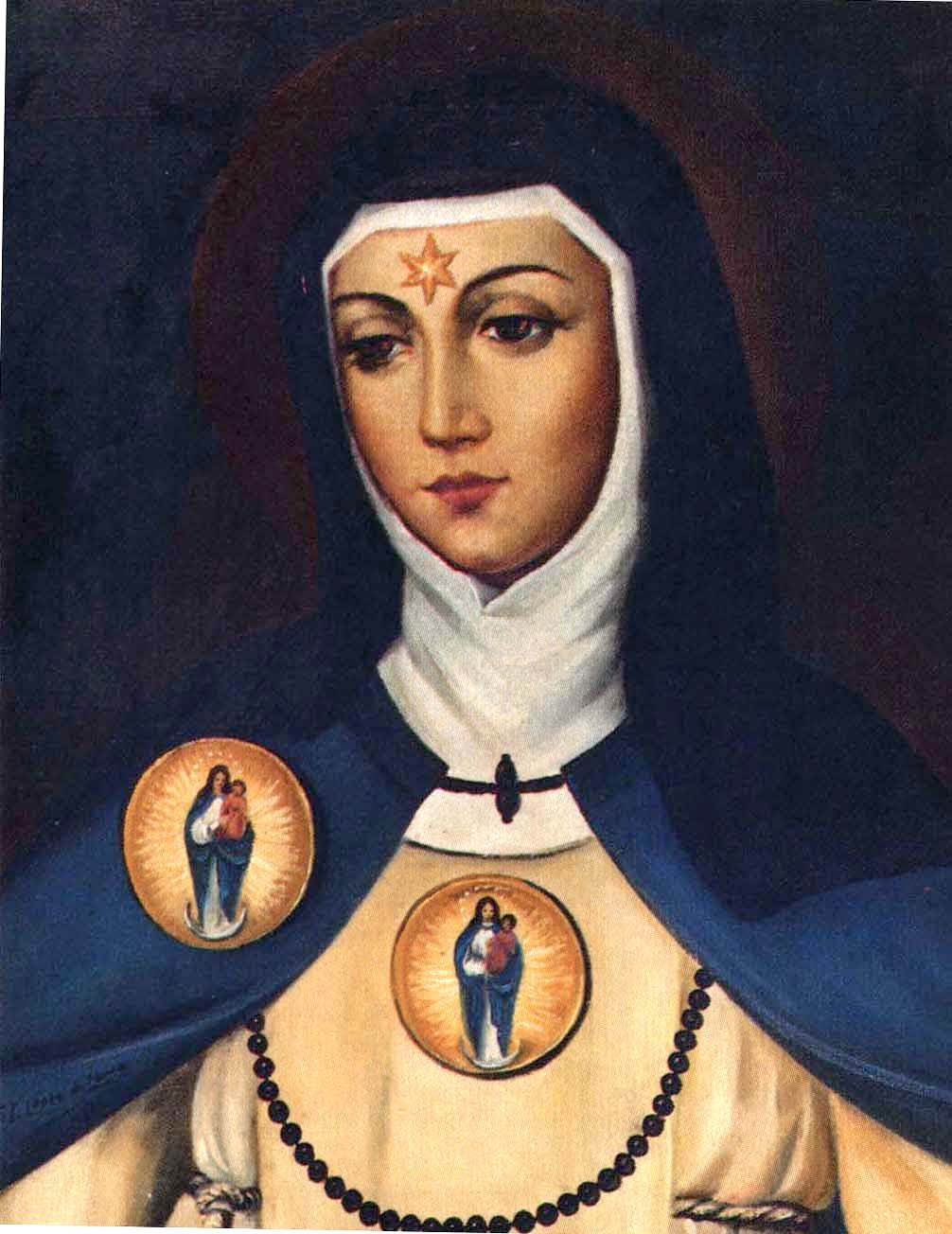
Saint Beatrice of Silva

- January 25 – Ygo Gales Galama, Frisian warlord and freedom-fighting rebel (murdered) (b. 1443)
- April 8 – Lorenzo de' Medici, ruler of Florence (b. 1449)
- March 19 – Philip II, Count of Nassau-Weilburg (1429–1492) (b. 1418)
- c. May 21 – John de la Pole, 2nd Duke of Suffolk (b. 1442)
- June 7 – Casimir IV Jagiellon, King of Poland (b. 1427)
- June 8 – Elizabeth Woodville, Queen of Edward IV of England (b. 1437)
- July 1 – Henry the Younger of Poděbrady, Bohemian nobleman (b. 1452)
- July 25 – Pope Innocent VIII (b. 1432)
- August 9 – Beatrice of Silva, Spanish Dominican and Roman Catholic nun and a saint
- September 20 – Anne Neville, Countess of Warwick (b. 1426)
- September 23 – Peter Courtenay, English bishop and politician
- October 12 – Piero della Francesca, Italian artist (b. c. 1412)
- October 25 – Thaddeus McCarthy, Irish bishop (b. c. 1455)
- November 6 – Antoine Busnois, French composer and poet (b. c. 1430)
- November 9 – Jami, Persian poet (b. 1414)
- November 24 – Loys of Gruuthuse, Earl of Winchester (b. c. 1427)

=== Exact date unknown ===
- Ali al-Jabarti, Somali scholar and politician
- Baccio Pontelli, Italian architect (b. c. 1450)
- Dhammazedi, Burmese king of Hanthawaddy (b. 1409)
- Eric Clauesson, Swedish Norse pagan
- Satal Rathore, Rao of Marwar
- Sonni Ali, Songhai ruler
