= 1507 =

1507 in various calendars
- Gregorian calendar: 1507; MDVII
- Ab urbe condita: 2260
- Armenian calendar: 956; ԹՎ ՋԾԶ
- Assyrian calendar: 6257
- Balinese saka calendar: 1428–1429
- Bengali calendar: 913–914
- Berber calendar: 2457
- English Regnal year: 22 Hen. 7 – 23 Hen. 7
- Buddhist calendar: 2051
- Burmese calendar: 869
- Byzantine calendar: 7015–7016
- Chinese calendar: 丙寅年 (Fire Tiger); 4204 or 3997 — to — 丁卯年 (Fire Rabbit); 4205 or 3998
- Coptic calendar: 1223–1224
- Discordian calendar: 2673
- Ethiopian calendar: 1499–1500
- Hebrew calendar: 5267–5268
- Hindu calendars
- Vikram Samvat: 1563–1564
- Shaka Samvat: 1428–1429
- Kali Yuga: 4607–4608
- Holocene calendar: 11507
- Igbo calendar: 507–508
- Iranian calendar: 885–886
- Islamic calendar: 912–913
- Japanese calendar: Eishō 4 (永正４年)
- Javanese calendar: 1424–1425
- Julian calendar: 1507; MDVII
- Korean calendar: 3840
- Minguo calendar: 405 before ROC 民前405年
- Nanakshahi calendar: 39
- Thai solar calendar: 2049–2050
- Tibetan calendar: མེ་ཕོ་སྟག་ལོ་ (male Fire-Tiger); 1633 or 1252 or 480 — to — མེ་མོ་ཡོས་ལོ་ (female Fire-Hare); 1634 or 1253 or 481

April 25: New World continent first referred to as "America"

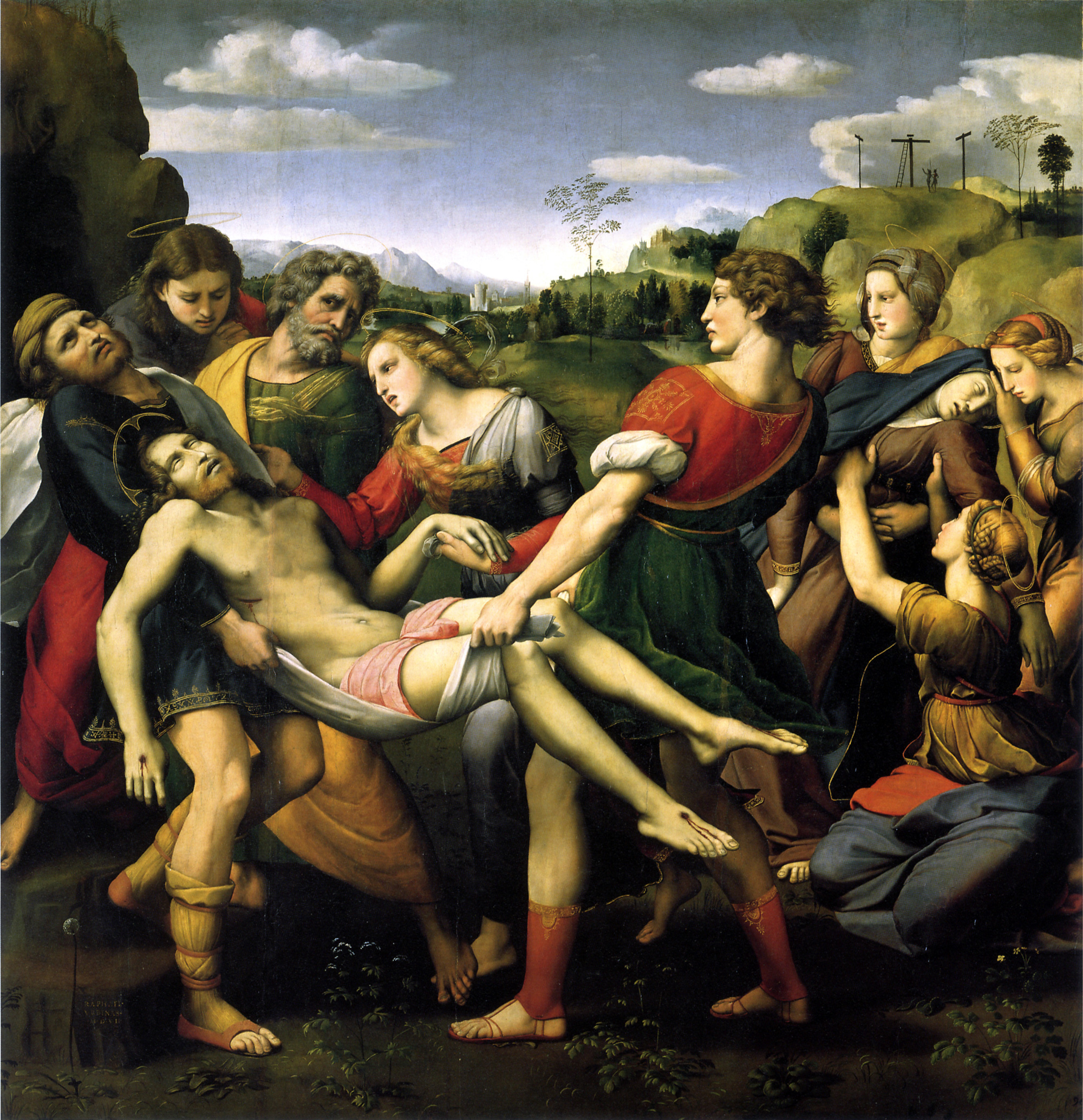
Raphael completes The Deposition

Year 1507 (MDVII) was a common year starting on Friday of the Julian calendar.

== Events ==
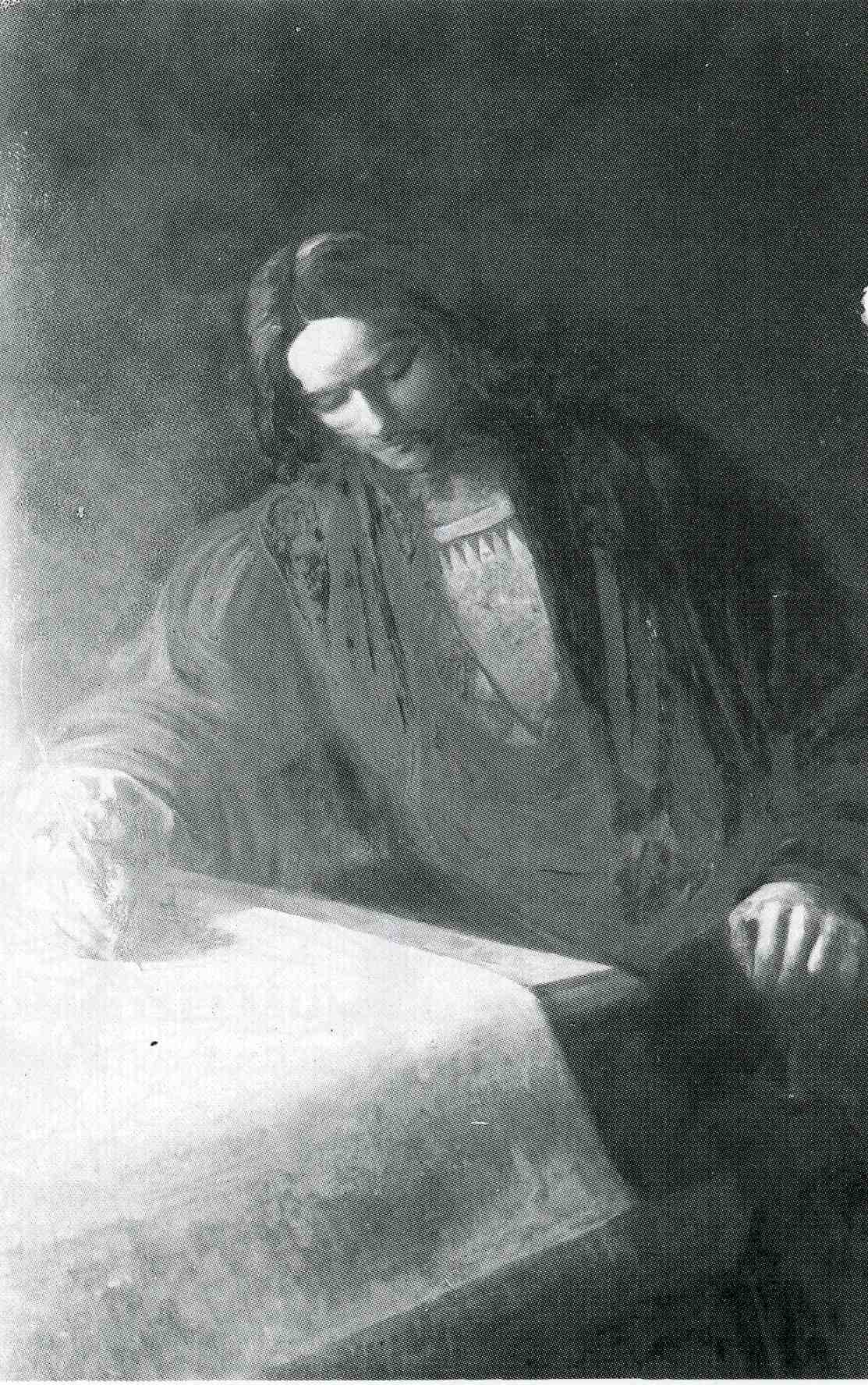
Waldseemüller maps America.

=== January–March ===
- January 24 – Sigismund I the Old is formally crowned King of Poland, at a ceremony in Kraków.
- February 9 – The crew of the Portuguese ship Cirne, commanded by Diogo Fernandes Pereira, become the first Europeans to sight the Indian ocean island of Réunion, and name it Santa Apolonia.
- March 1 – Eleven months after the Lisbon Massacre, King Manuel I of Portugal issues an edict permitting the cristãos-novos ("New Christians", Portuguese Jews who had been forced to convert to Christianity) to freely emigrate from the kingdom.
- March 11 – Italian mercenary leader and former prince Cesare Borgia, later cited by Niccolò Machiavelli in The Prince as an example of "conquest by fortune", completes his conquest of the Spanish city of Viana by driving out the defenders of the castle of the Count of Lerín, but makes the mistake of pursuing the fleeing enemy by himself. He is killed the next day by his captors.
- March 28 – The revolutionary council of the Republic of Genoa declares a war against French invaders.

=== April–June ===
- April 3 – At Erfurt, German monk Martin Luther is ordained by the suffragan bishop Johann Bonemilch as a priest of the Catholic Church.
- April 10 – Installed by the Revolutionary Council, Paolo da Novi becomes the first Doge of the Republic of Genoa in almost 19 years, after the office had been made vacant in 1488 by the conqueror Francesco Sforza. He reigns for only 18 days before fleeing from office by French occupation forces on April 28, and the dogeship will remain vacant again for five years.
- April 25 – Martin Waldseemüller publishes his Cosmographiae Introductio ("Introduction to Universal Cosmography") and accompanying wall map, the first to show the Americas as a separate continent, naming them in honour of Amerigo Vespucci, his friend and idol.
- April 27
  - In India, in what is now the state of Kerala, troops from the Kingdom of Cannanore begin a four-month siege of the Portuguese garrison at the Fort of Saint Angelo. Despite being outnumbered, the 150 defenders of the fort hold out for four months against 60,000 attackers until rescue arrives four months later.
  - In Germany, the Imperial Diet of the Holy Roman Empire convenes at Konstanz and begins a series of reforms.
- April 29 – French troops retake the city of Genoa after a seven-day siege, defeating rebels who had taken control in July 1506.
- May 14
  - Lorenzo Lotto's painting, the Santa Cristina al Tiverone Altarpiece, is unveiled at the Church of Santa Cristina in the Italian city of Treviso.
  - In Italy, King Louis XII of France departs from Genoa and makes a triumphant entry into Milan on May 24.
- June 4 – Having been denied recognition by Pope Julius II as King of Naples, King Ferdinand II of Aragon departs from Naples to return to his home in Spain.
- June 28 – Ferdinand II is welcomed by Louis XII of France at the Italian city of Savona in a spectacular ceremony, and the two monarchs begin a series of meetings on the division of the Italian kingdoms between France and Spain.

=== July—September ===
- July 3 – Ferdinand II and Louis XII complete their six-day summit at Savona.
- July 20 – King Ferdinand II of Aragon returns to Valencia to resume his rule of his Spanish kingdom.
- August 10 – Afonso de Albuquerque departs with six ships from the Yemeni island of Socotra to begin pillaging towns along the way to conquering the Persian Gulf port of Hormuz.
- August 27 – A fleet of 11 ships from the Portuguese Navy's 8th Armada arrives in India and rescues the Portuguese defenders of the fort of Saint Angelo from the attack by the Kingdom of Cannanore.
- September 15 – King James IV grants a patent for the first printing press in Scotland, to Walter Chapman and Andrew Myllar "to furnis and bring hame ane prent, with all stuff belangand tharto, and expert men to use the samyne, for imprenting within our Realme of the bukis of our Lawis, actis of parliament, croniclis, mess bukis, and portuus efter the use of our Realme, with addicions and legendis of Scottis sanctis, now gaderit to be ekit tharto, and al utheris bukis that salbe sene necessar, and to sel the sammyn for competent pricis."
- September 26 – A fleet commanded by Portugal's Afonso de Albuquerque arrives at the port of Hormuz on the Persian Gulf and sets about to conquer it.

=== October—December ===
- October 10 – The Kingdom of Portugal conquers the island of Ormuz in the Persian Gulf.
- November 24 – Portuguese Admiral Tristao da Cunha, with 12 ships, attacks a fleet of 13 Muslim merchant ships leaving the Indian port of Ponnani, and is confronted by the forces of Kutti Ali. The Portuguese win the battle.
- November 26 – Pope Julius II issues a damnatio memoriae forcing the members of the House of Borgia out of control of the Papal States.
- December 21 – Princess Mary of England, the 11-year-old daughter of King Henry VII, is betrothed to the 7-year-old Duke of Burgundy.

=== Date unknown ===
- The Timurid Dynasty ends, when Uzbeks under Muhammad Shaybani capture the capital, Herat, and Emir Badi' al-Zaman Mirza flees.
- The Portuguese occupy Mozambique, and the islands of Socotra and Lamu.
- The Portuguese found the town of Stone Town in Mozambique.
- Cardinal Cisneros is appointed inquisitor general of Castile.
- Raphael paints The Deposition, among other works.
- The Aztec New Fire ceremony is held for the last time (according to Bernardino de Sahagún).
- The Electron Lahar occurs on Mount Rainier in Washington state.

== Births ==
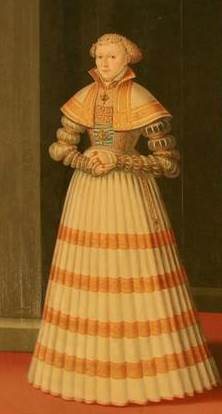
Anna of Brandenburg, Duchess of Mecklenburg

- January 1 – Anna of Brandenburg, Duchess of Mecklenburg-Güstrow (d. 1567)
- January 14
  - Catherine of Austria, Queen of Portugal (d. 1578)
  - Luca Longhi, Italian painter (d. 1580)
- January 25 – Johannes Oporinus, Swiss printer (d. 1568)
- February 11 – Philip II, Metropolitan of Moscow, Russian Orthodox monk (d. 1569)
- February 21 – James, Duke of Rothesay, Scottish prince (d. 1508)
- March 7 – Magdalena of Saxony (d. 1534)
- March 25 – Thomas White, English politician (d. 1566)
- March 29 – Henry II, Duke of Münsterberg-Oels and Count of Glatz (d. 1548)
- April 13 – Konrad Hubert, German theologian and hymnwriter (d. 1577)
- May 9 – Tijmen Groenewegen, Dutch politician
- June 5 – Ferdinand of Portugal, Duke of Guarda and Trancoso, Portuguese nobleman (d. 1534)
- June 6 – Annibale Caro, Italian poet and Knight of Malta (d. 1566)
- June 25 – Marie of Baden-Sponheim, duchess consort of Bavaria (d. 1580)
- July 25 – Chamaraja Wodeyar IV, King of Mysore (d. 1576)
- August 2 – William Waldegrave, English Member of Parliament (d. 1554)
- August 15 – George III, Prince of Anhalt-Dessau, German prince (d. 1553)
- September 16 – Jiajing Emperor of China (d. 1567)
- September 27 – Guillaume Rondelet, French physician (d. 1566)
- October 1
  - Johannes Sturm, German educator (d. 1589)
  - Giacomo Barozzi da Vignola, Italian architect (d. 1573)
- October 4 – Francis Bigod, British noble (d. 1537)
- October 19 – Viglius, Dutch politician (d. 1577)
- October 26 – Alvise I Mocenigo, Doge of Venice (d. 1577)
- October 29 – Fernando Alvarez de Toledo, Spanish general (d. 1582)
- November 25 – Joos de Damhouder, Belgian jurist (d. 1581)
- December 18 – Ōuchi Yoshitaka, Japanese warlord (d. 1551)
- date unknown
  - Bálint Bakfark, Hungarian composer (d. 1576)
  - Sir Ralph Sadler, English statesman (d. 1587)
- probable
  - Jacques Arcadelt, Franco-Flemish composer (d. 1568)
  - Inés Suárez, Spanish conquistadora (d. 1580)
- possible
  - Anne Boleyn, second queen of Henry VIII (b. this year or 1501; d. 1536)

== Deaths ==
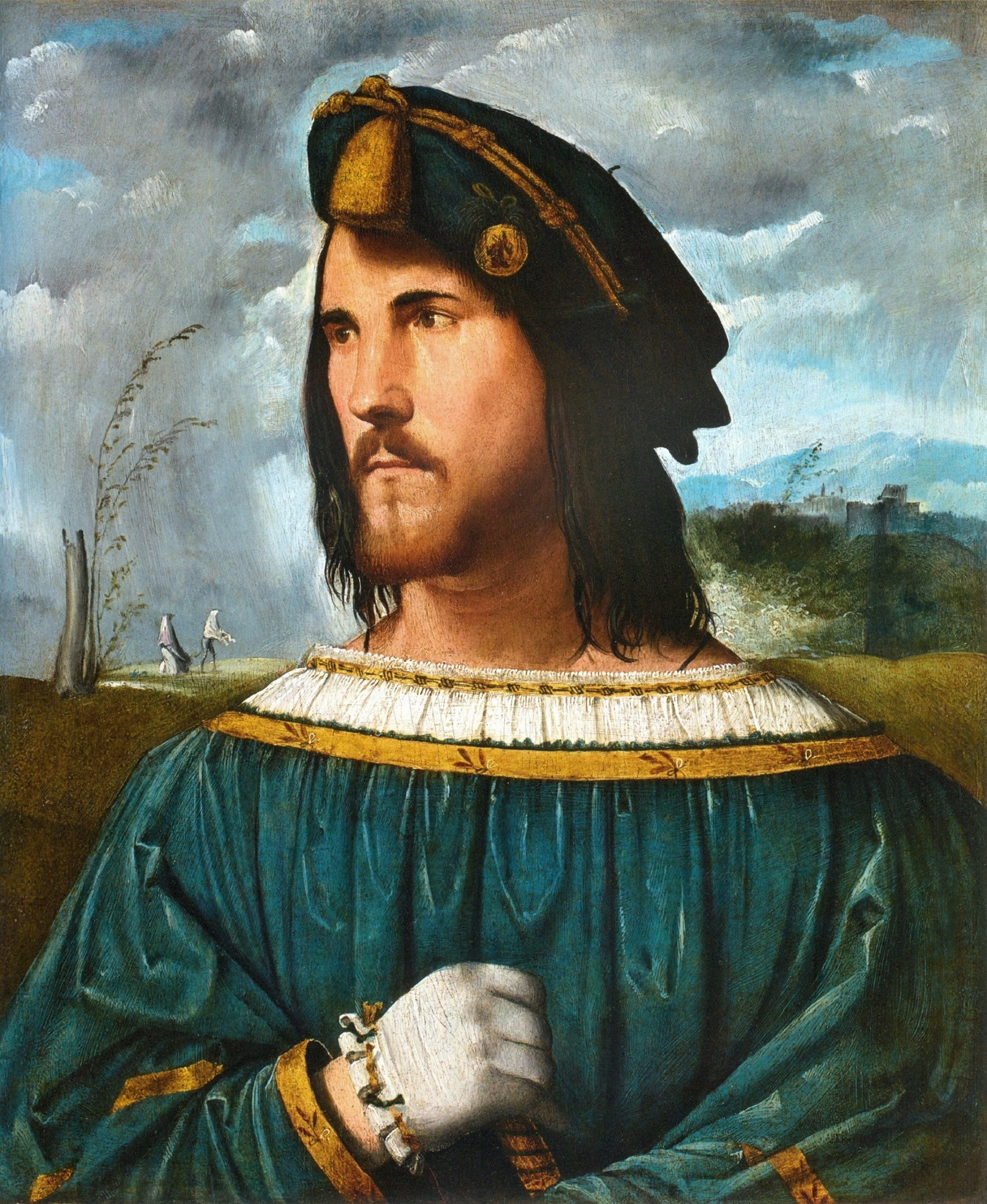
Portrait of a Gentleman (Cesare Borgia)

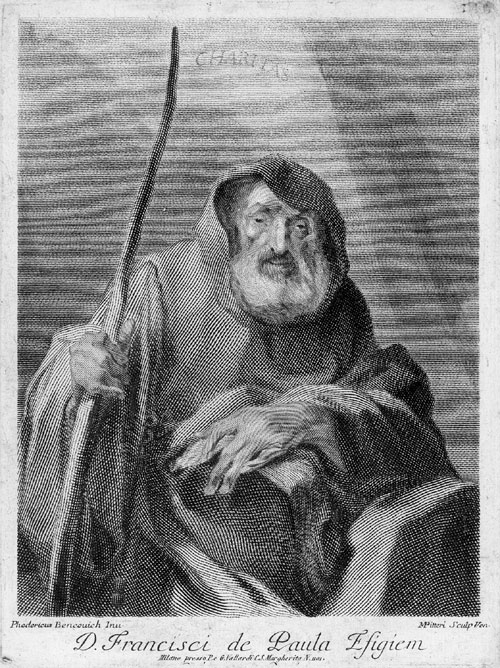
Saint Francis of Paola

- January 17 – Henry IV of Neuhaus (b. 1442)
- March 12 – Cesare Borgia, Italian general and statesman. (b. 1475)
- March 21 – Jan Feliks "Szram" Tarnowski, Polish nobleman (b. 1471)
- April 1 – Sigismondo d'Este, Italian nobleman (b. 1433)
- April 2 – Francis of Paola, Italian founder of the Order of the Minims (b. 1416)
- July 5 – Crinitus, Italian humanist (b. 1475)
- July 8 – Anna Notaras, Byzantine noblewoman (b. 1436)
- July 29 – Martin Behaim, German navigator and geographer (b. 1459)
- August 15 – John V, Duke of Saxe-Lauenburg (b. 1439)
- August 23 – Jean Molinet, French writer (b. 1435)
- August 24 – Cecily of York, English princess (b. 1469)
- December – Ingeborg Tott, influential Swedish noblewoman, spouse of Swedish regent Sten Sture the elder
- Date unknown – Agnes Jónsdóttir, Icelandic abbess (b. year unknown)
