= Chamaraja Wodeyar V =

Maharaja of Mysore from 1576 to 1578

8th Maharaja of Mysore
- Reign: 22 November 1576 – 26 November 1578
- Predecessor: Chamaraja Wodeyar IV
- Successor: Raja Wodeyar I
- Died: 1578; Puragiri, Mysore
Names
- Maha Mandalaswara Birud-antembara-ganda Raja Bettada Chamaraja Devaraja Wodeyar V
- House: Wodeyar
- Father: Rajakumara Krishnaraja

Chamaraja Wodeyar V (died 1578) was the eighth maharaja of the Kingdom of Mysore from 1576 until his deposition in 1578.

== Ascension to throne and immediate death ==
After the death of his uncle Chamaraja Wodeyar IV, Chamaraja Wodeyar V took power, but died in two years' time on the throne. In span of less than a decade, three monarchs had died, his being the most recent. His father died in 1572, his uncle in 1576, and now himself in 1578. Chamaraja's death caused more concern among Mysore nobles. His first-cousin, Raja Wodeyar I, succeeded him.

Map showing Mysore and other petty kingdoms and principalities in the region ca. 1625, during the reign of Chamaraja Wodeyar V.

== See also ==
- Maharaja of Mysore
- Wodeyar dynasty
