= 1566 =

1566 in various calendars
- Gregorian calendar: 1566; MDLXVI
- Ab urbe condita: 2319
- Armenian calendar: 1015; ԹՎ ՌԺԵ
- Assyrian calendar: 6316
- Balinese saka calendar: 1487–1488
- Bengali calendar: 972–973
- Berber calendar: 2516
- English Regnal year: 8 Eliz. 1 – 9 Eliz. 1
- Buddhist calendar: 2110
- Burmese calendar: 928
- Byzantine calendar: 7074–7075
- Chinese calendar: 乙丑年 (Wood Ox); 4263 or 4056 — to — 丙寅年 (Fire Tiger); 4264 or 4057
- Coptic calendar: 1282–1283
- Discordian calendar: 2732
- Ethiopian calendar: 1558–1559
- Hebrew calendar: 5326–5327
- Hindu calendars
- Vikram Samvat: 1622–1623
- Shaka Samvat: 1487–1488
- Kali Yuga: 4666–4667
- Holocene calendar: 11566
- Igbo calendar: 566–567
- Iranian calendar: 944–945
- Islamic calendar: 973–974
- Japanese calendar: Eiroku 9 (永禄９年)
- Javanese calendar: 1485–1486
- Julian calendar: 1566; MDLXVI
- Korean calendar: 3899
- Minguo calendar: 346 before ROC 民前346年
- Nanakshahi calendar: 98
- Thai solar calendar: 2108–2109
- Tibetan calendar: ཤིང་མོ་གླང་ལོ་ (female Wood-Ox); 1692 or 1311 or 539 — to — མེ་ཕོ་སྟག་ལོ་ (male Fire-Tiger); 1693 or 1312 or 540

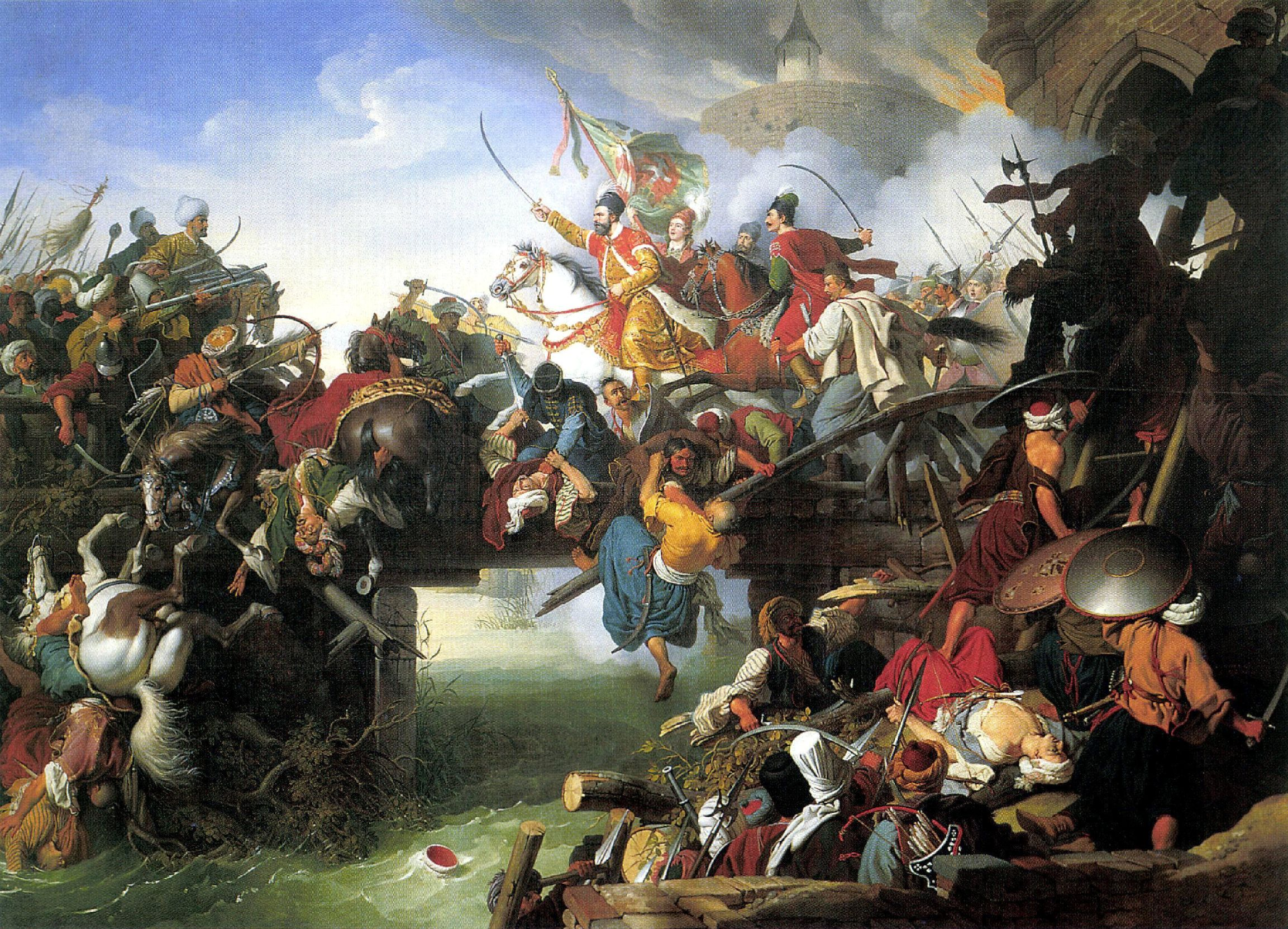
September 7: General Zrinski leads a final charge against the Ottoman Turks at Szigetvár (1825 painting by Johann Peter Krafft)

Year 1566 (MDLXVI) was a common year starting on Tuesday of the Julian calendar.

== Events ==
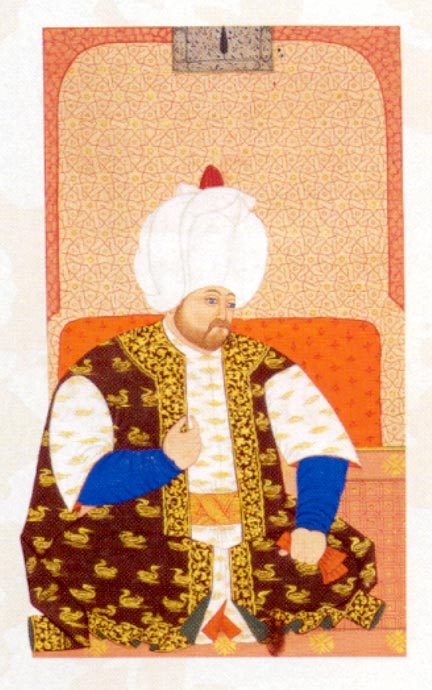
Selim II becomes Sultan of the Ottoman Empire.

=== January–March ===
- January 7 – Cardinal Michele Ghislieri is elected as the new Pope by two-thirds of the College of Cardinals, to succeed Pope Pius IV, who had died 28 days earlier on December 8. Ghislieri becomes the 225th pope, and takes the regnal name Pope Pius V.
- February 24 – In one of the first gun assassinations in Japanese (if not world) history, Mimura Iechika, the daimyō (warlord) of the Bitchū Province, is shot dead by two brothers (Endo Matajiro and Yoshijiro), sent by his rival Ukita Naoie.
- March 28 – The foundation stone of Valletta, which will become Malta's capital city, is laid by Jean Parisot de Valette, Grand Master of the Sovereign Military Order of Malta.
- March – The Hanseatic city of Lübeck launches the galleon Adler von Lübeck, probably the largest ship in the world at this time.

=== April–June ===
- April 5 – The Compromise of Nobles is presented to Margaret of Parma, Governor of the Habsburg Netherlands, but it succeeds only in delaying the beginning of the Eighty Years' War in the Netherlands.
- May 1
  - Charles IX, King of France, completes his grand tour of his kingdom, returning to Paris a little more than 27 months and 2,500 miles (4,000 km) after his departure on January 24, 1564.
  - Suleiman the Magnificent, the Sultan of the Ottoman Empire, begins his last campaign, departing from Constantinople at the head of one of the largest armies he has ever commanded, with a plan to attack Vienna, capital of the Holy Roman Empire. However, he dies in September.
- May 13 – Maximilian II, Holy Roman Emperor imposes a Reichsexekution upon John Frederick II, Duke of Saxony. Augustus, Elector of Saxony is directed to carry out the order to begin the siege of the city of Gotha and John Frederick's home at the Grimmenstein Castle.
- May 25 – King Philip II of Spain issues laws against the remaining Spanish Muslims, including a ban against use of the Arabic language, wearing of traditional Arab or Muslim clothing, a requirement that doors in their homes and buildings be kept open every Friday and on Muslim feast days (in order to verify that Muslim rituals are not observed), and forces the tearing down of public and private bathhouses (to prevent purification rites).
- May 30 – The Augsburg Imperial Coin Edict issues from the Holy Roman Empire, authorizing a new coin, the thaler. The new unit of money, the Reichsthaler, follows standards providing that the weight should be based on one-ninth of a Cologne mark of silver (the "9 Thaler standard") with each minted coin to weigh 29.23 grams and to contain 25.96 grams of silver. The word thaler, an abbreviation for the "Joachimsthaler" minted from the silver mines at Joachimsthal (modern-day Jáchymov in the Czech Republic), is anglicized to dollar, the name of currencies in many nations.
- June 10 – In Znojmo (in the modern-day Czech Republic), Wilhelm von Rosenberg, commander of the Army of the Kingdom of Bohemia, begins raising an army to fight an expected invasion by the Ottoman Empire.

=== July–September ===
- July 22 – Pope Pius V issues an edict to expel most prostitutes from Rome, and the Papal States. The edict is soon reversed because of the loss of revenue from the taxation of houses of prostitution.
- July 25 – Feodor Stefanovich Kolychov is consecrated as the patriarch of the Russian Orthodox Church as Philip II, Metropolitan of Moscow with the approval of the Tsar Ivan the Terrible, but soon defies the Tsar. Philip will be deposed in 16 months later and put to death on December 23, 1568.
- July 28 – John Sigismund Zápolya, uncrowned claimant to the throne of the King of Hungary, leads an invasion of Upper Hungary on the orders of Ottoman Sultan Suleiman.
- July 31 – King Philip II of Spain sends a final letter to the administrators and Catholic bishops of the Spanish Netherlands, rejecting a request to abolish ordinances treating Protestants as heretics. The decision leads to an uprising against Spain by Calvinists and ultimately to the Eighty Years War.
- August 6 – The siege of Szigetvár is begun by Suleiman the Magnificent, Sultan of the Ottoman Empire. This is the Ottoman Empire at its greatest extent.
- August 10 – The Beeldenstorm, also called the "Iconoclastic Fury", begins as Protestant Calvinists engage in widespread destruction of religious art in what are now the Netherlands and Belgium.
- August 16 – The Beeldenstorm arrives at Ypres and the St Martin's Cathedral is plundered, with the library and artifiacts of Bishop Martin Rythovius burned.
- August 25 – The vandalism of the Beeldenstorm reaches Leiden.
- September 7 – Suleiman the Magnificent dies in his tent of natural causes aged 71 the day before the end of the siege of Szigetvár, and Selim II succeeds him as Sultan of the Ottoman Empire.
- September 8 – The siege of Szigetvár ends in a fierce battle with the annihilation of 2,300 Hungarian and Croatian defenders, including their general, Nikola Šubić Zrinski, annihilated by an army of 90,000 soldiers of the Ottoman Empire, under Sokollu Mehmed Pasha. Before charging out with his remaining 600 troops, General Zrinski orders the gates to the fortress to be opened and fires a large cannon, loaded with broken iron, killing hundreds of Ottoman attackers as they enter. As a final measure, according to one source, Zrinski orders a long fuse to be lit to the fortress gunpowder magazine and the powder explodes while thousands of Ottomans are inside.

=== October–December ===
- October 2 – Richard Onslow (Solicitor General) is elected as the Speaker of the English House of Commons by a vote of 82 to 70.
- October 8 – Catherine of the Austrian Habsburgs, Queen of consort of Poland since 1553 as wife of Sigismund II Augustus, leaves Poland to return to Austria after the failure of her marriage. She never comes back to Poland, though she remains the official queen consort until her death in 1572.
- October 19 – Gastón de Peralta, 3rd Marquess of Falces becomes the Viceroy of New Spain, replacing Francisco Ceinos. Peralta is removed from office by King Philip II after charges are made that Peralta is planning a rebellion against the crown.
- October 28 – In Kneiphof, a city in the Duchy of Prussia (modern-day Ostrov Immanuinga Kanta in Russia), Albert, Duke of Prussia has three of the town's five councilors beheaded on charges of causing political and religious disputes with the other Prussian states. Johann Funck, Matthias Horst, and Hans Schnell are executed in the town's marketplace, while Paul Skalich and Johann Steinbach are able to flee the country.
- November 5 – Queen Elizabeth I of England addresses the English Parliament and champions English nationalism, asking "Was I not born in this realm? Were my parents born in any foreign country? Is there any cause I should alienate myself from being careful over this country? Is not my kingdom here?"
- November 23 – By decree of King Philip II of Spain, the content of gold in the Spanish gold escudo, is raised from 350 maravedis (equivalent to 338 centigrams) of gold to 400 (386 cg) and equivalent to 16 silver reales.
- November 26 – At the Craigmillar Castle, the advisers to Mary, Queen of Scots – James Stewart, 1st Earl of Moray; Secretary of State William Maitland of Lethington; Lord Chancellor George Gordon, 5th Earl of Huntly; Archibald Campbell, 5th Earl of Argyll; and James Hepburn, 4th Earl of Bothwell – advise her to divorce her husband, Henry Stuart, Lord Darnley. She refuses and the advisers decide that Darnley must be killed.
- December 17 – The baptism of Prince James, son of Mary Queen of Scots, takes place at Stirling Castle

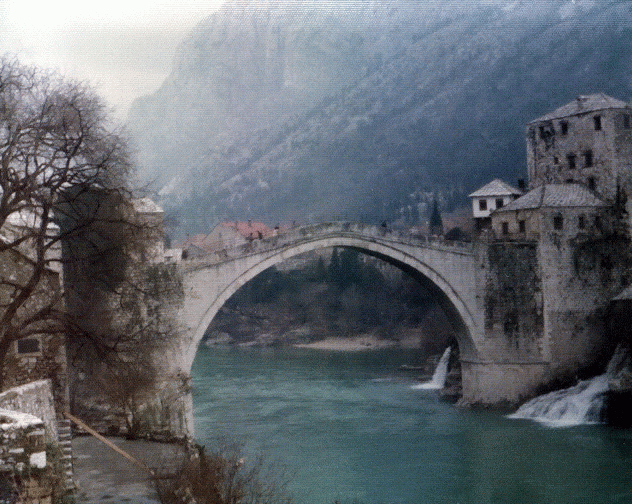
The Stari Most bridge

=== Date unknown ===
- Between July 19, 1566 and July 7, 1567 (during the Islamic calendar year 974 AH) – The first bridge crossing the Neretva River at Mostar in Herzegovina is completed by the Ottoman Empire. The white marble bridge becomes known as Stari Most ("Old Bridge").

== Births ==
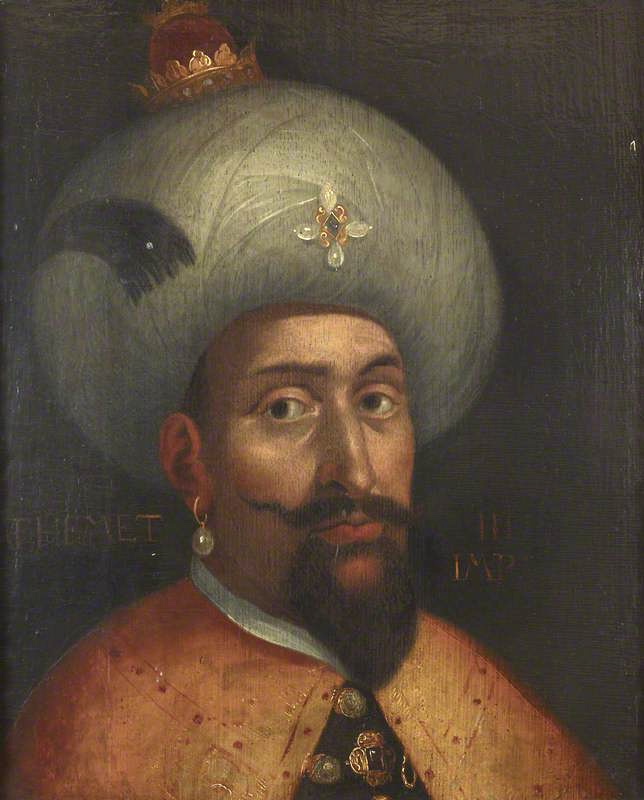
Sultan Mehmed III

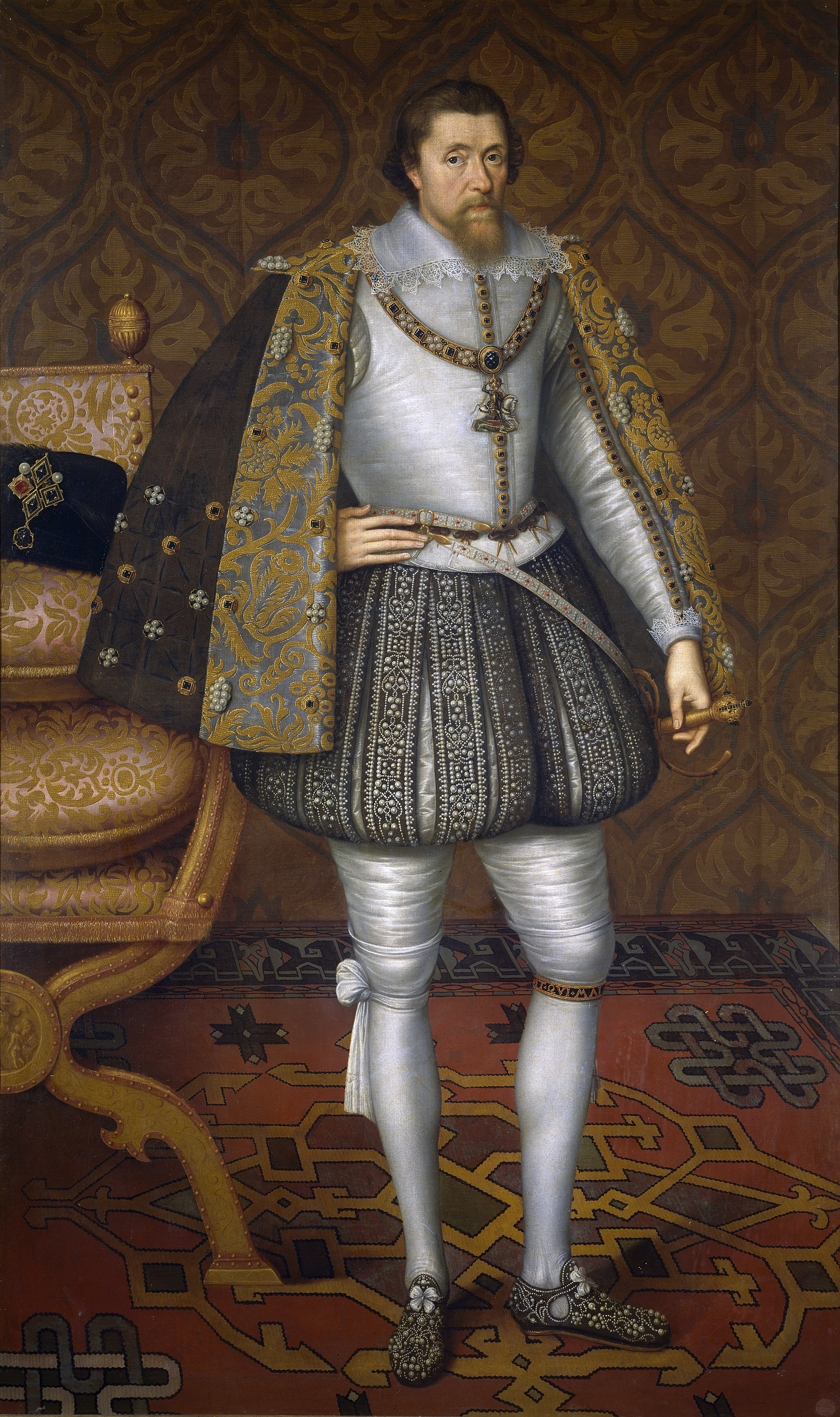
King James VI of Scotland/James I of England and Ireland

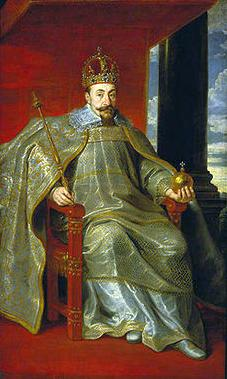
King Sigismund III Vasa

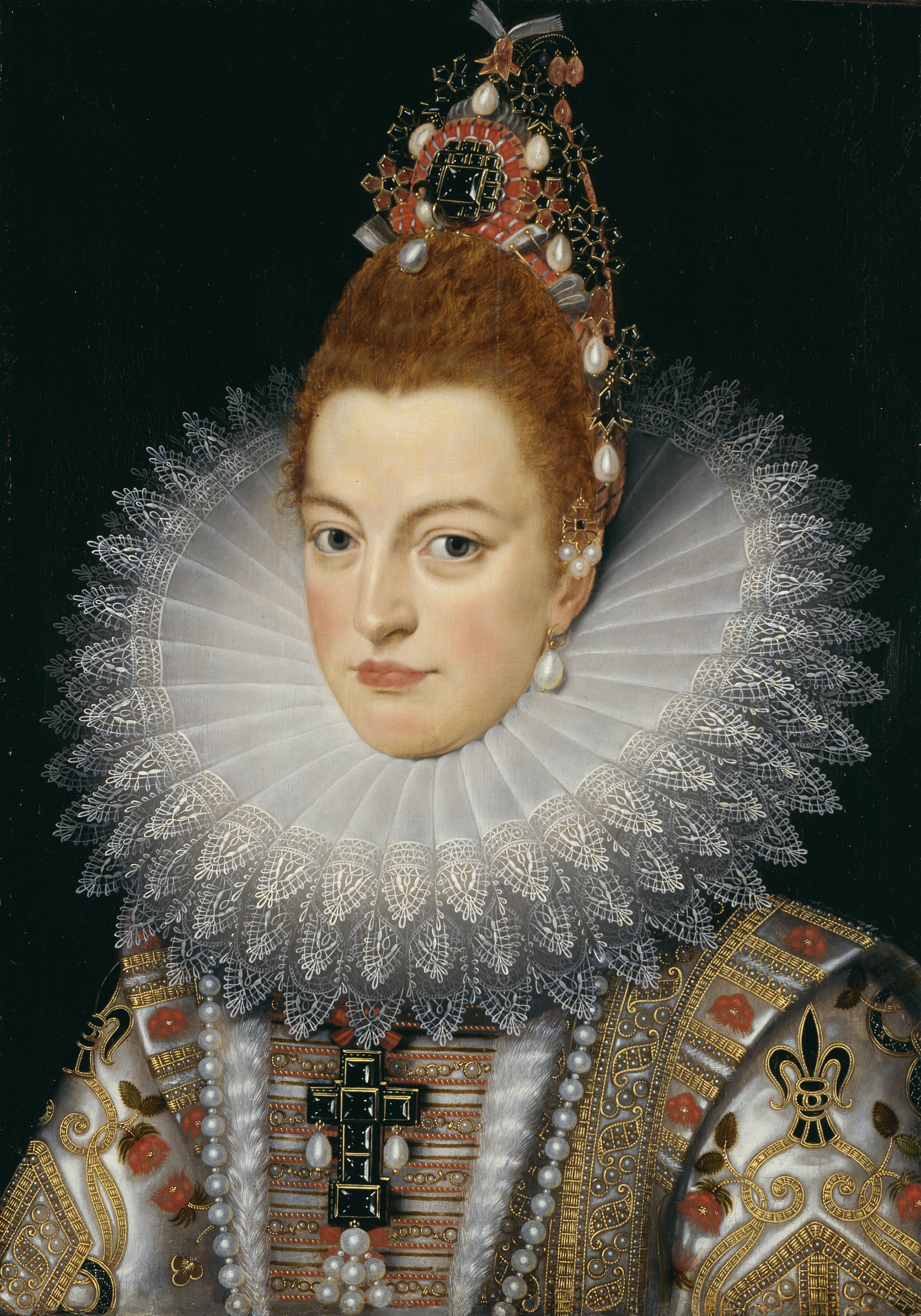
Isabella Clara Eugenia

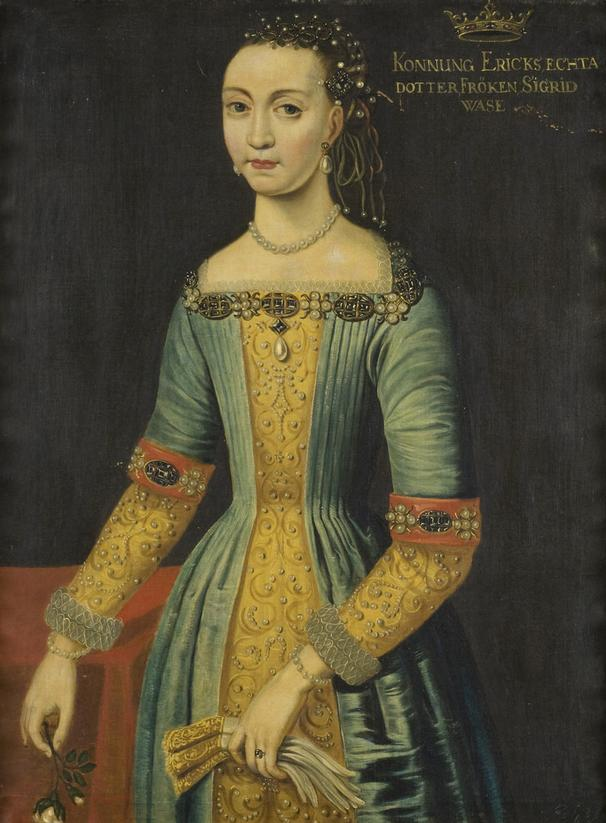
Sigrid of Sweden

- January 13 – Maria of Brunswick-Lüneburg, Duchess Consort of Saxe-Lauenburg (1582–1619) (d. 1626)
- January 15 – Philipp Uffenbach, German artist (d. 1636)
- January 17 – Anna Juliana Gonzaga, Archduchess of Austria and nun (d. 1621)
- February 1 – Marie of the Incarnation, French Discalced Carmelite beatified nun and blessed (d. 1618)
- February 2 – Michal Sedziwój, Polish alchemist (d. 1636)
- February 18 – Francesco Erizzo, Doge of Venice (d. 1646)
- March 1 – John Hoskins, English poet (d. 1638)
- March 8 – Carlo Gesualdo, Italian music composer (d. 1613)
- April 2 – Bartholda van Swieten, Dutch diplomat (d. 1647)
- May 26 – Mehmed III, Ottoman Sultan (d. 1603)
- June 19 – King James VI of Scotland/James I of England and Ireland (d. 1625)
- June 20 – King Sigismund III Vasa, of Poland and Sweden (d. 1632)
- July 9 – John Ernest, Duke of Saxe-Eisenach, German duke (d. 1638)
- August 12 – Isabella Clara Eugenia, Infanta of Spain (d. 1633)
- August 24 – Abraham Scultetus, German theologian (d. 1625)
- September 1 – Edward Alleyn, English actor (d. 1626)
- October 13 – Richard Boyle, 1st Earl of Cork, Irish politician (d. 1643)
- October 15 – Sigrid of Sweden, Swedish princess (d. 1633)
- November 3 – Charles, Count of Soissons, French prince du sang and military commander (d. 1612)
- November 9 – Christian, Duke of Brunswick-Lüneburg, Prince of Lüneburt (1611–1633) (d. 1633)
- November 21 – Francesco Cennini de' Salamandri, Roman Catholic cardinal (d. 1645)
- November 25 – John Heminges, English actor (d. 1630)
- November 26 – Francesco Bracciolini, Italian poet (d. 1645)
- December 1 – Philip of Nassau, Count of Nassau (d. 1595)
- December 11 – (baptised) – Manuel Cardoso, Portuguese composer (d. 1650)
- December 19 – George Talbot, 9th Earl of Shrewsbury, English earl (d. 1630)
- December 27 – Jan Jesenius, Slovak physician (d. 1621)
- date unknown
  - Pietro Cerone, Italian music theorist (d. 1625)
  - Polyxena von Lobkowicz, politically active Czech aristocrat (d. 1642)
  - Giovanni Baglione, Italian painter and historian of art (d. 1643)
  - Lucia Quinciani, Italian composer
  - James Sempill, Scottish theologian (d. 1626)
  - Caterina Vitale, Maltese pharmacist (d. 1619)

== Deaths ==
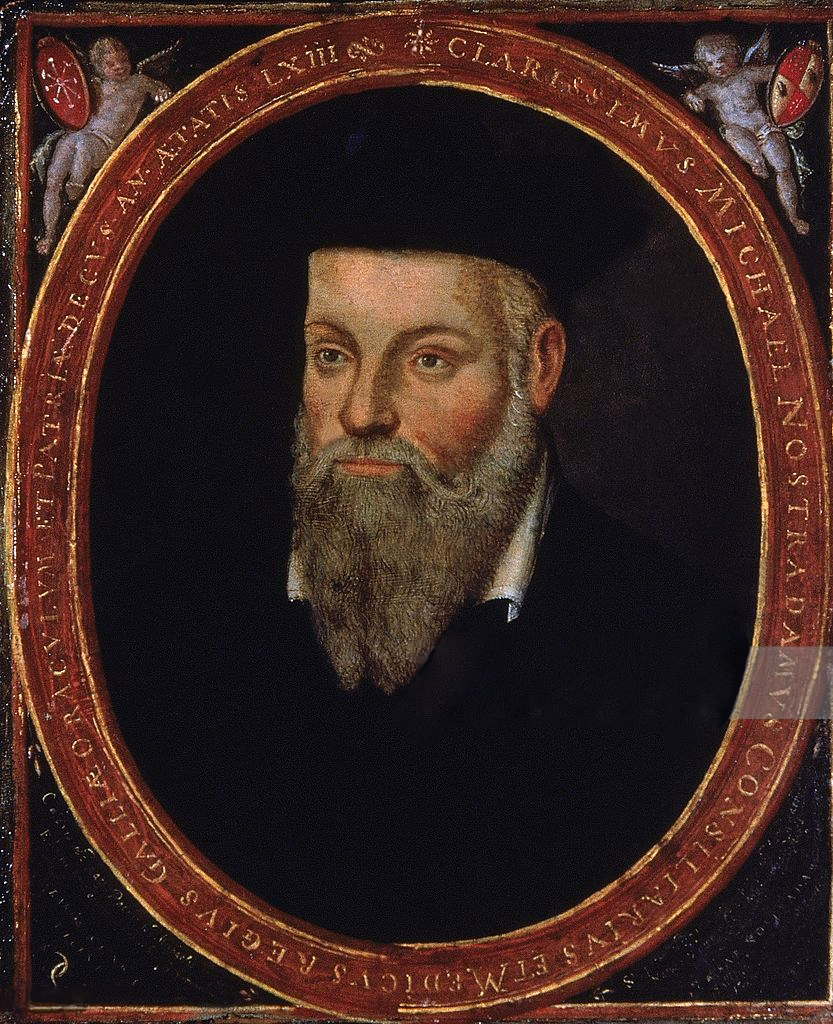
Nostradamus

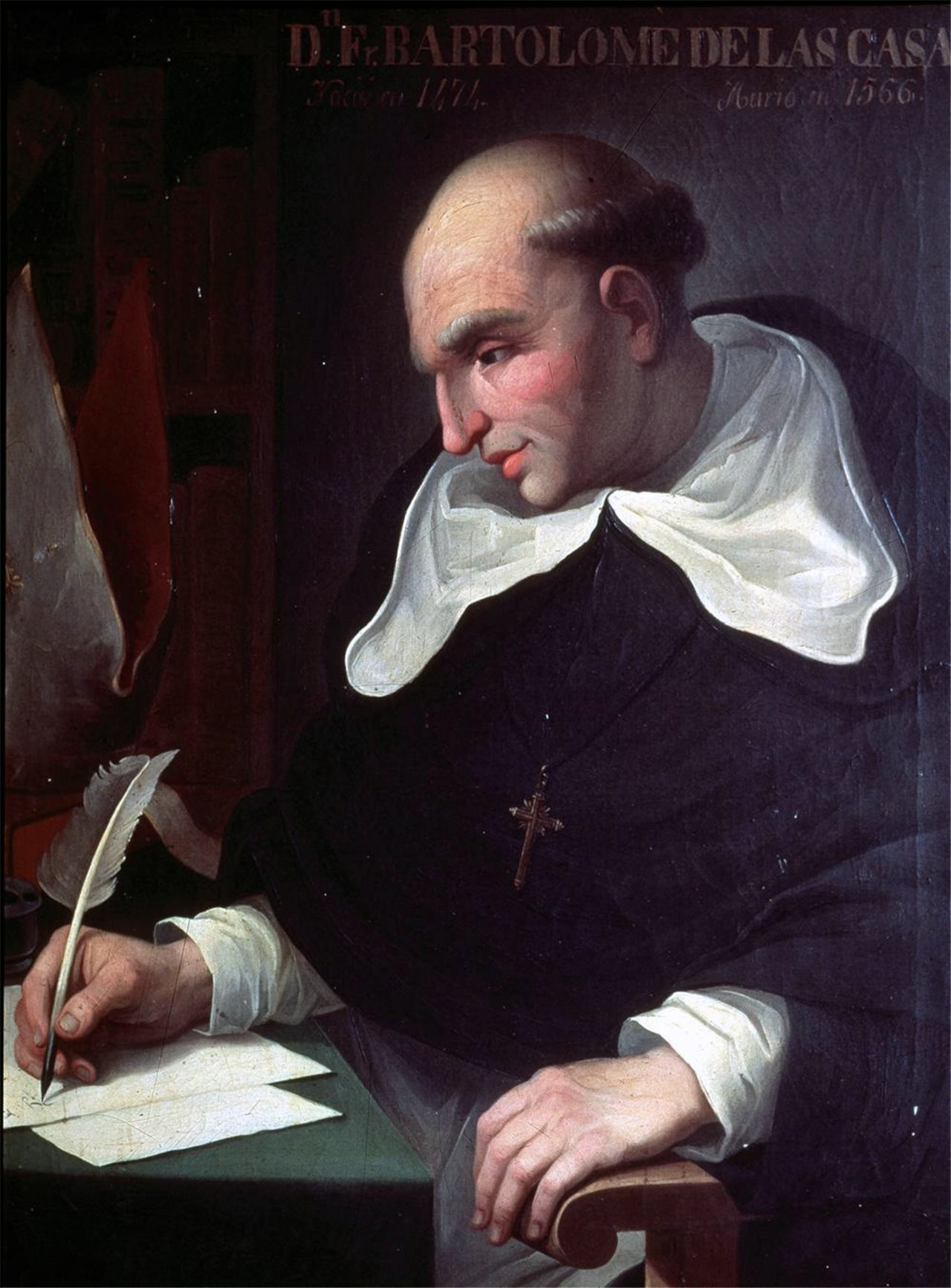
Bartolomé de las Casas

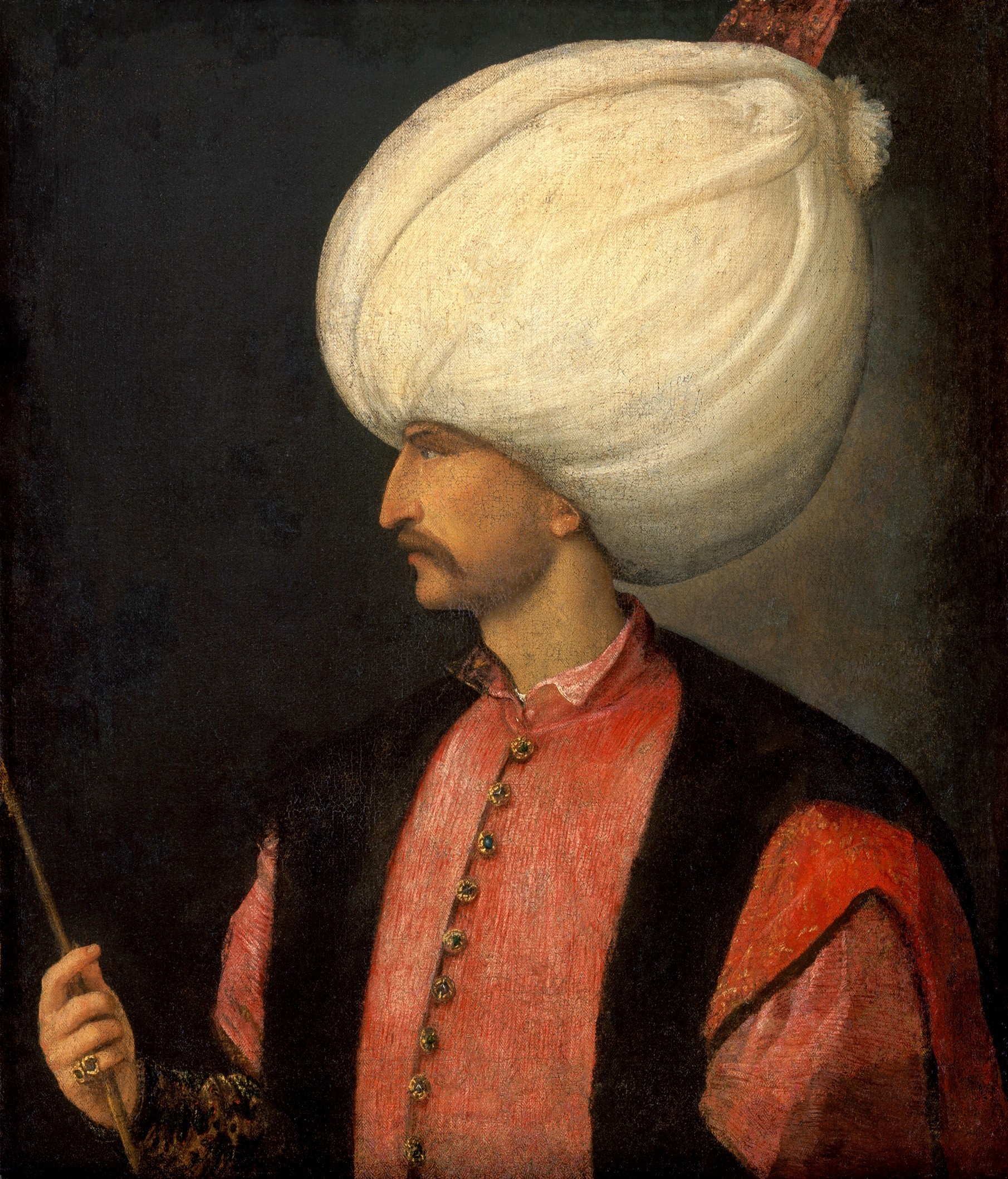
Sultan Suleiman the Magnificent

- January 6 – Francesco Gonzaga, Spanish Catholic cardinal (b. 1538)
- January 7 – Louis de Blois, Flemish mystical writer (b. 1506)
- February 3 – George Cassander, Flemish theologian (b. 1513)
- February 24 – Mimura Iechika, Japanese warlord (b. 1517)
- March 9 – David Rizzio, Italian secretary of Mary, Queen of Scots (b. 1533)
- March 23 – Wolfgang, Prince of Anhalt-Köthen, German prince (b. 1492)
- March 26 – Antonio de Cabezón, Spanish composer and organist (b. 1510)
- March 28 – Sigismund von Herberstein, Austrian diplomat (b. 1486)
- April 25 – Diane de Poitiers, mistress of King Henry II of France (b. 1499)
- April 25 – Louise Labé, French poet (b. c. 1524)
- May 10 – Leonhart Fuchs, German physician and a botanist (b. 1501)
- July 2 – Nostradamus, French astrologer (b. 1503)
- July 13 – Thomas Hoby, English diplomat and translator (b. 1530)
- July 18 – Bartolomé de las Casas, Spanish priest (b. 1484)
- July 30 – Guillaume Rondelet, French doctor (b. 1507)
- August 19 – Elisabeth of Brunswick-Calenberg, Countess of Henneberg (b. 1526)
- September 2 – Taddeo Zuccari, Italian painter (b. 1529)
- September 6 – Suleiman the Magnificent, Ottoman Sultan since 1520 (b. 1494)
- September 17 – Íñigo López de Mendoza, 4th Duke of the Infantado (b. 1493)
- September 22 – Johannes Agricola, German Protestant reformer (b. 1494)
- September 27 – Marco Girolamo Vida, Italian poet (b. 1490)
- October 13 – Zilia Dandolo, Venetian dogaressa
- October 28 – Johann Funck, German theologian (b. 1518)
- October 31 – Richard Edwardes, English poet (b. 1523)
- November 2 – Thomas White, English politician (b. 1507)
- November 17 – Annibale Caro, Italian poet and Knight of Malta (b. 1507)
- November 27 – Froben Christoph of Zimmern, author of the Zimmern Chronicle (b. 1519)
- December 1 – Francisco Mendoza de Bobadilla, Spanish Catholic cardinal (b. 1508)
- December 14 – René, Marquis of Elbeuf (b. 1536)
- December 26 – Kimotsuki Kanetsugu, Japanese samurai (b. 1511)
- December 28 – Margaret Paleologa, Sovereign Marchioness of Montferrat (1531–1540) (b. 1510)
- date unknown
  - Charles Dumoulin, French jurist (b. 1500)
  - Calvagh O'Donnell, Irish chieftain
- probable – Jacob Acontius, Swiss jurist, theologian, philosopher and engineer (b. 1492)
