= Timmaraja Wodeyar II =

Maharaja of Mysore from 1553 to 1572

6th Maharaja of Mysore
- Reign: 26 January 1553 – January 1572
- Predecessor: Chamaraja Wodeyar III (father)
- Successor: Chamaraja Wodeyar IV (youngest brother)
- Born: 16 September 1511
- Died: January 1572 (aged 60); Puragiri, Mysore
Names
- Maha Mandalaswara Birud-antembara-ganda Raja Monegara Appana Timmaraja Wodeyar II
- House: Wodeyar
- Father: Chamaraja Wodeyar III

Timmaraja Wodeyar II (16 September 1511 – January 1572), was the sixth maharaja of the Kingdom of Mysore, who ruled from 1553 until his death in 1572. He was eldest son of Chamaraja Wodeyar III, the fifth raja of Mysore. On 26 January 1553, he succeeded on the death of his father. Thimmaraja Wodeyar II was the first 'maharaja' to rule as absolute monarch and denounce Mysore Kingdom's vassalage to the Vijayanagara Empire.

== Declaration of independence from Vijayanagara ==
Right in his father's days, Thimmaraja Wodeyar II had learnt the lineage of the royal families in Vijayanagara. Both his father and his brother, including himself, had begun to question the legitimacy of the Tuluva family. Before his father could take a stand against feudalism, he died. However, right after coming to power in 1553, he formally declared independence of the Kingdom of Mysore from the Vijayanagara Empire. In Vijayanagara, though, Rama Raya was in power, trying to hold together the falling pieces of the empire. But, disintegration and insubordination were faster than Rama Raya's consolidation of power. In this political mood, the Bahamani sultans and the Mughal emperors began further invasion of fiefdoms. Thimmaraja Wodeyar II took this opportunity and declared independence, although it wasn't until his brother's time that this came into full swing.

He died in 1572 and was succeeded by his brother Chamaraja Wodeyar IV.

== See also ==
- Rama Raya
- Chamaraja Wodeyar IV
- Wodeyar dynasty
