= Donato Giannotti =

Italian political writer and playwright

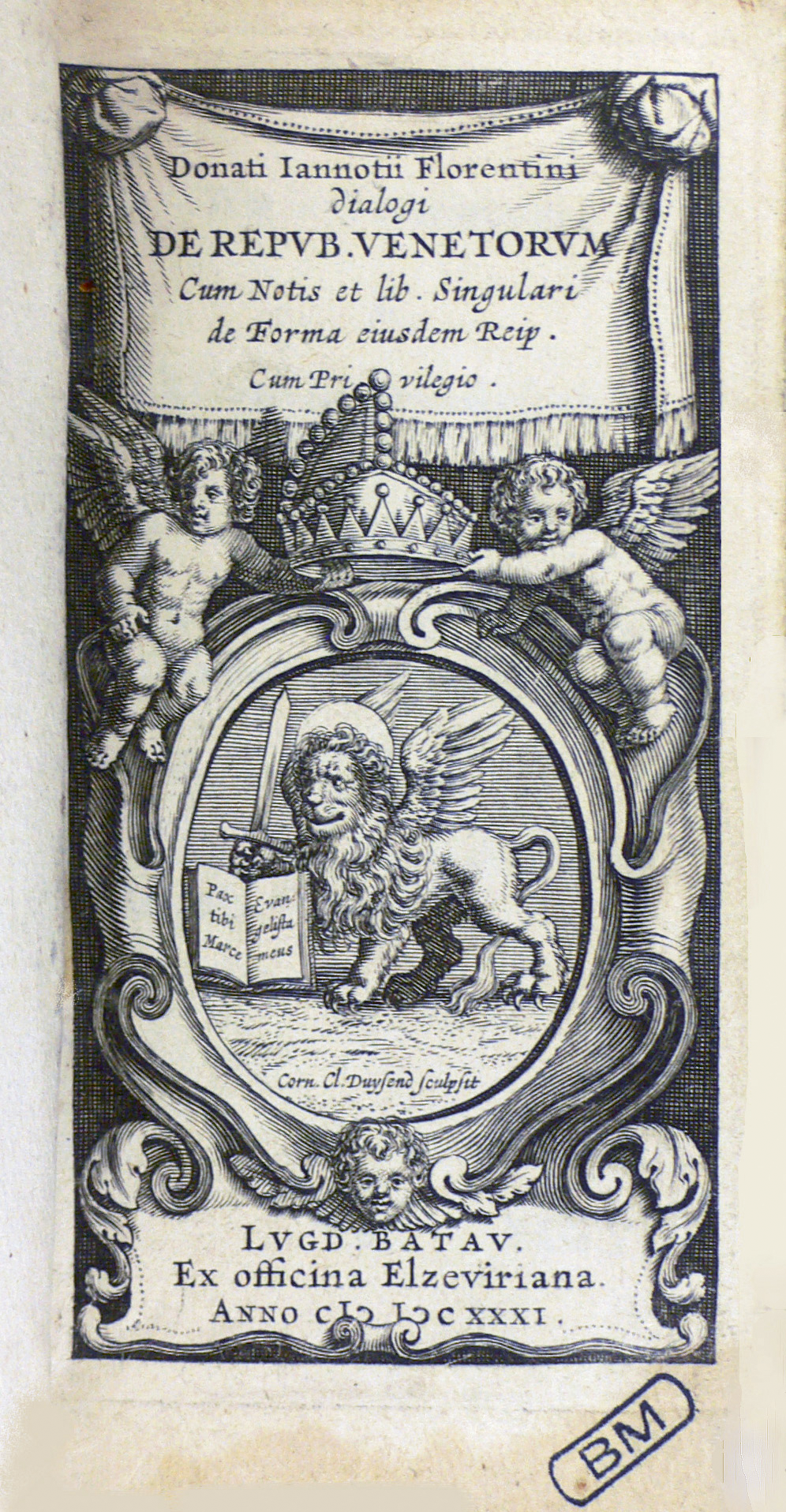
Dialogi de Repub. Venetorum, 1631.

Donato Giannotti (27 November 1492 – December 1573) was an Italian political writer and playwright.

He was one of the leaders of the short-lived Florentine Republic of 1527. He subsequently wrote theoretical works on republicanism. After the return of the Medicis, he lived in exile, dying in Rome. He was supported by Cardinal Niccolò Ridolfi.

He became acquainted with Michelangelo at the time he worked in the Signoria in Florence. According to Vasari, Giannotti approached Michelangelo with the commission from Ridolfi, for the Brutus.

== Works ==
- Della repubblica fiorentina (1531)
- Dialogi de Republica Venetorum (1540)
- Il Vecchio amoroso, play
- Milesia in terzine, play
- Lettere a Piero Vettori
- Dialoghi de' Giorni che Dante Consumo nel Cercare l'Inferno e'l Purgatorio (1546)

== Bibliography ==
- R. Starn (ed.), Donato Giannotti and His Epistolae (1968)
- D. J. Gordon, Gianotti, Michelangelo and the cult of Brutus, in: F. Saxl 1890-1984
- Donato Giannotti, Lettere a Piero Vettori, pubblicate sopra gli originali del British Museum da R. Ridolfi e C. Roth..., Florence, Vallecchi ed., 1932.
- Alois Riklin, Division of Power avant la lettre: Donato Giannotti (1534), in: History of Political Thought Vol. XXIX, 2/2008, S. 257-272.
