= Chamaraja Wodeyar IV =

Maharaja of Mysore from 1572 to 1576

7th Maharaja of Mysore
- Reign: 19 January 1572 – 9 November 1576
- Predecessor: Timmaraja Wodeyar II (oldest brother)
- Successor: Chamaraja Wodeyar V (nephew)
- Born: 25 July 1507
- Died: 9 November 1576 (aged 69)
- Issue: Raja Wodeyar I, Devaraja, Bettada Chamaraja, Chikkadepa
Names
- Maha Mandalaswara Birud-antembara-ganda Raja Hiriya Bola Chamaraja Wodeyar IV
- House: Wodeyar
- Father: Chamaraja Wodeyar III

Chamaraja Wodeyar IV (25 July 1507 – 9 November 1576) was the seventh maharaja of the Kingdom of Mysore. He was the youngest son of Chamaraja Wodeyar III, the fifth raja of Mysore. He took over the kingdom at the age of 65 after his older brother's death in 1572 and ruled for four years until 1576.

== Reign ==
He was struck by lightning which resulted in baldness; thereafter he was nicknamed Bola (the bald).

In 1572, he succeeded on the death of his elder brother Timmaraja Wodeyar II. Although Timmaraja Wodeyar II had declared Mysore Kingdom independent of the Vijayanagara Empire, it was not ratified. Chamaraja Wodeyar IV strongly opposed Vijayanagara. He immediately expelled the Vijayanagar envoys and revenue collectors from Mysore Kingdom. Although he had to retain a small delegation of Vijayanagara in Srirangapattana, he had all other traces of Vijayanagara high command removed throughout his kingdom.

== Acquisition of Bangalore ==
Kempe Gowda I built a town out of an uninhabited mass of land around the time Chamaraja Wodeyar IV was born. He grew up listening to the valorous stories of Kempe Gowda I and his Bangalore town. The Mysore Kingdom expanded quite considerably in the last 173 years and had grown into a formidable kingdom. Chamaraja Wodeyar IV led an expedition after Kempe Gowda's death in 1569 and acquired Bangalore.

On 9 November 1576, he died, and his nephew Chamaraja Wodeyar V succeeded him.

== See also ==
- Bangalore town
- Wodeyar dynasty
