= Chamaraja Wodeyar III =

Raja of Mysore from 1513 to 1553

5th Raja of Mysore
- Reign: 8 April 1513 – 17 February 1553
- Predecessor: Chamaraja Wodeyar II (father)
- Successor: Timmaraja Wodeyar II (eldest son)
- Born: 29 September 1492
- Died: 17 February 1553 (aged 60); Puragiri, Mysore
- Issue: Timmaraja Wodeyar II, Krishnaraja, Chikka Devira, Chamaraja Wodeyar IV
Names
- Maha Mandalaswara Birud-antembara-ganda Hiriya Bettada Vijaya Chamaraja Wodeyar III
- House: Wodeyar
- Father: Chamaraja Wodeyar II

Chamaraja Wodeyar III (29 September 1492 – 17 February 1553) was fifth raja of the Kingdom of Mysore and the last one to rule as feudal king under the Vijayanagara Empire. He reigned after his father's demise in 1513 until his death in 1553.

== Reign under Krishnadevaraya ==
Chamaraja Wodeyar III ruled under four Vijayanagara emperors of the Tuluva dynasty. He began his kingship under Emperor Krishnadevaraya. Krishnadevaraya's rajaguru was Sri Vyasatirtha, a Mysore-born guru and philosopher. Further, the growing rebel against Vijayanagara was suspended by Chamaraja Wodeyar III's father, Chamaraja Wodeyar II in order to understand Krishnadevaraya first. Krishnadevaraya proved to be an extremely efficient ruler. He was inordinately knowledgeable. His reign focussed on all aspects of livelihood: arts and literature, culture, politics and business, and whatnot. Besides, his rule was justified by its benevolence, and hence none under him rose against him. He also defeated Yusuf Adil Khan's offspring Yusuf Adil Khan of the Bijapur Sultanate and annexed many Bahamani holdings.

== After Krishnadevaraya ==
During the last days of Krishnadevaraya and after his time, his brother Achyuta Deva Raya took over, continuing in his brother's footsteps. He was succeeded by his son Venkata Raya. However, Venkata Raya's maternal uncle, Salakaraju Chinna Tirumala, had all claimants to the throne assassinated and usurped to power. He even went on to place the Bijapur Sultan Ibrahim Adil Shah I in his place for seven days in defiance of Venkata Raya's supporters. This was too much for Vijayanagara's nobles to tolerate. This was also the apple of discord for all subordinate Hindu rulers, including Chamaraja Wodeyar III. After diplomatically convincing, Salakaraju Chinna Tirumala returned. But Venkata Raya's followers assassinated Salakaraju Chinna Tirumala and installed Achyuta Raya's nephew, Sadasiva Raya, with Krishnadevaraya's son-in-law Rama Raya as royal adviser, who played de facto emperor, and was strategically mediating among the Deccan Sultanates with the long-term intention of breaking them apart. During this period, Chamaraja Wodeyar came to begin questioning the authenticity of the Vijayanagara ruling family and what had become of it from the Sangama dynasty to the Tuluva family. He was queasy about bowing before the centre in Vijayanagara and had unofficially begun to undermine the centre's authority. He thought that it was not necessary any more for Mysore Kingdom to act as feudal lords but as allied friends. But before he could take a political stand, Chamaraja Wodeyar III died.

== The Palace Fort ==
Chamaraja Wodeyar III constructed the fort of Mysore on the site of what was a village called Puragiri, whereupon today stands Mysore Palace. The place was named as 'Mysore Nagara'. This fort defined for the first time the seat and palace of the monarch of the Kingdom of Mysore. The fort has been built and rebuilt multiple times, like the palace itself it abuts, with the most recent in 1940, commissioned by Maharaja Jayachamaraja Wadiyar during the beginning of his reign.

Chamaraja Wodeyar III died on 17 February 1553.

== See also ==
- Wodeyar dynasty
- Mysore Palace
