= Cable railway =

Railway that uses a cable, rope or chain to haul trains

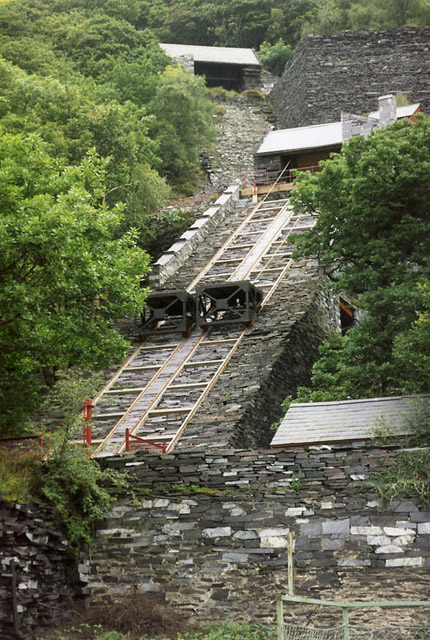
Trwnc incline at the Vivian Quarry showing two permanently attached platform wagons. Slate trucks were pushed onto the horizontal tops of these wagons to travel on the incline.

A cable railway is a railway that uses a cable, rope or chain to haul trains. It is a type of cable transportation.

The most common use for a cable railway is to move vehicles on a steeply graded line that is too steep for conventional locomotives – this is often called an incline or inclined plane, or, in New Zealand, a jigline, or jig line. A common form of incline is the funicular – an isolated passenger railway where the cars are permanently attached to the cable. In other forms, the cars attach and detach to the cable at the ends of the cable railway. Some cable railways are not steeply graded – these are often used in quarries to move large numbers of wagons between the quarry to the processing plant.

== History ==
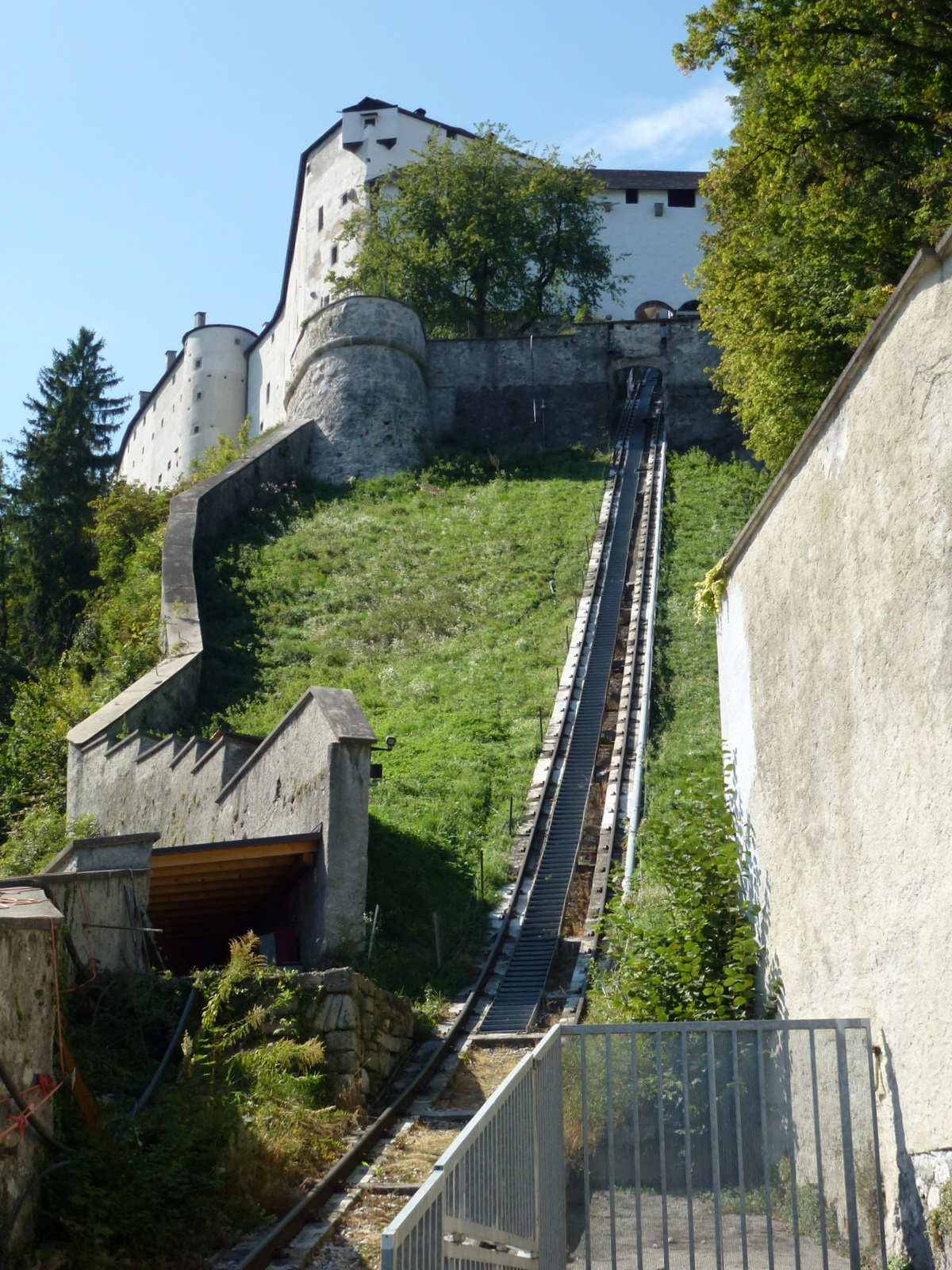
Reisszug, as it appeared in 2011

The oldest extant cable railway is probably the Reisszug, a private line providing goods access to Hohensalzburg Fortress at Salzburg in Austria. It was first documented in 1515 by Cardinal Matthäus Lang, who became Archbishop of Salzburg. The line originally used wooden rails and a hemp haulage rope and was operated by human or animal power. Today, steel rails, steel cables and an electric motor have taken over, but the line still follows the same route through the castle's fortifications. This line is generally described as the oldest funicular.

In the early days of the Industrial Revolution, several railways used cable haulage in preference to locomotives, especially over steep inclines. The Bowes Railway on the outskirts of Gateshead opened in 1826. Today it is the world's only preserved operational 4 ft 8 1/2 in (1,435 mm) standard gauge cable railway system. The Cromford and High Peak Railway opened in 1831 with grades up to 1 in 8. There were nine inclined planes: eight were engine-powered, one was operated by a horse gin. The Middleton Top winding engine house at the summit of Middleton Incline has been preserved and the ancient steam engine inside, once used to haul wagons up, is often demonstrated. The Liverpool and Manchester Railway opened in 1830 with cable haulage down a 1 in 48 grade to the dockside at Liverpool. It was originally designed for cable haulage up and down 1 in 100 grades at Rainhill in the belief that locomotive haulage was impracticable. The Rainhill Trials showed that locomotives could handle 1 in 100 gradients.

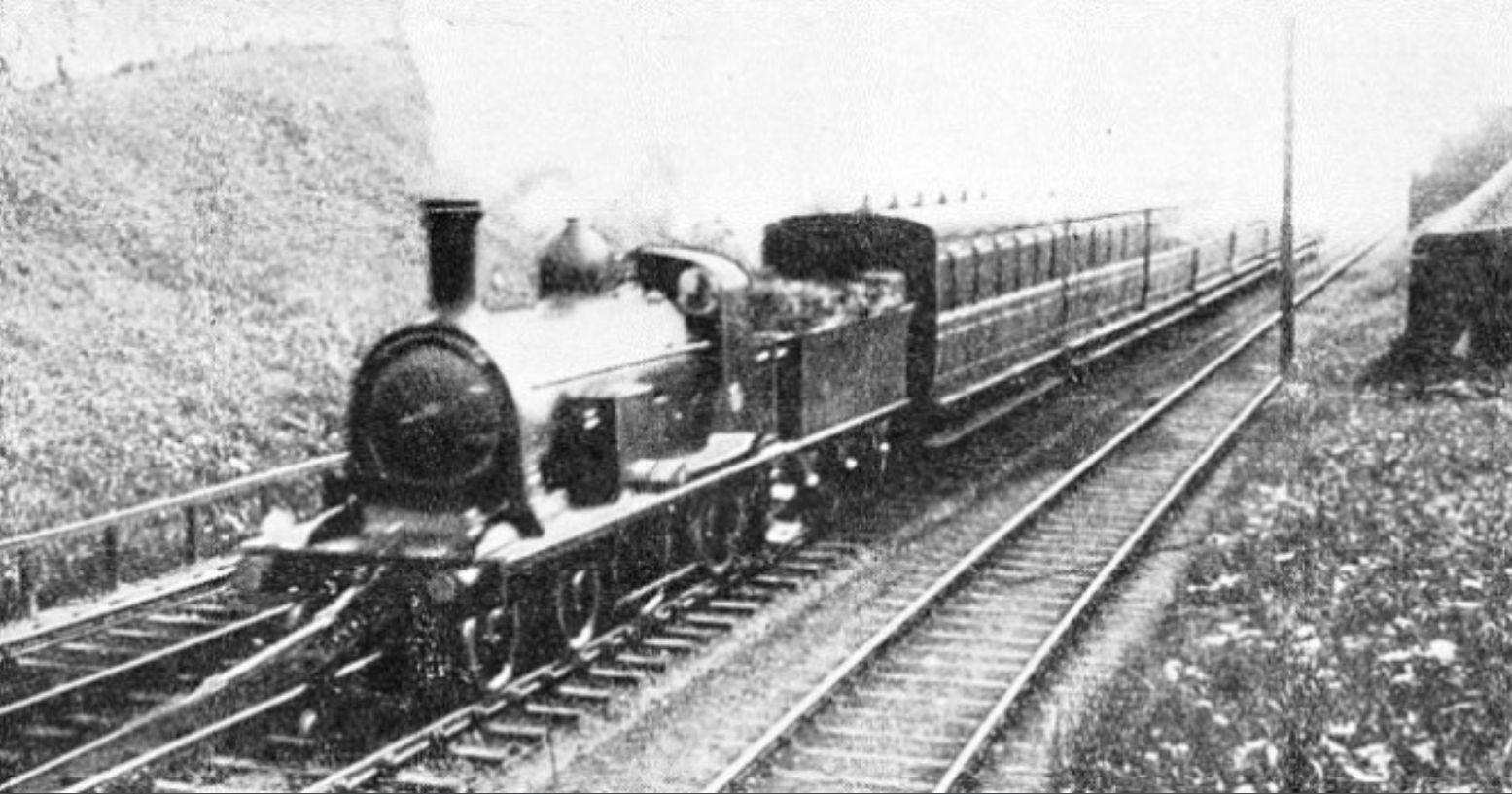
A train being hauled up Cowlairs Incline, Glasgow

In 1832, the 1 in 17 Bagworth incline opened on Leicester to Burton upon Trent Line; the incline was bypassed in 1848. On 20 July 1837, the Camden Incline, between Euston and Primrose Hill on the London and Birmingham Railway opened.

A Pit fishbelly gravitational railway operated between 1831 and 1846 to service the Australian Agricultural Company coal mine. B Pit opened 1837 and C Pit opened mid-1842. All were private operations by the same company.

== Inclines ==
The majority of inclines were used in industrial settings, predominantly in quarries and mines, or to ship bulk goods over a barrier ridgeline as the Allegheny Portage Railroad and the Ashley Planes feeder railway shipped coal from the Pennsylvania Canal and Susquehanna basin via Mountain Top to the Lehigh Canal in the Delaware River Basin. The Welsh slate industry made extensive use of gravity balance and water balance inclines to connect quarry galleries and underground chambers with the mills where slate was processed. Examples of substantial inclines were found in the quarries feeding the Ffestiniog Railway, the Talyllyn Railway and the Corris Railway amongst others.

The Ashley Planes were used to transship heavy cargo over the Lehigh-Susquehanna drainage divide for over a hundred years and became uneconomic only when average locomotive traction engines became heavy and powerful enough that could haul long consists at speed past such obstructions yard to yard faster, even if the more roundabout route added mileage.

=== Operation ===
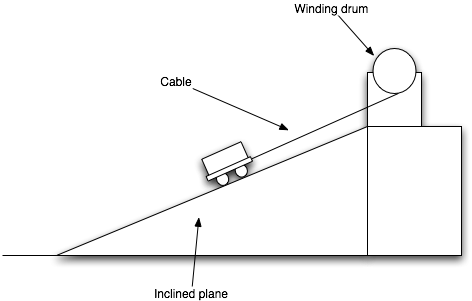
Sketch of a cable railway

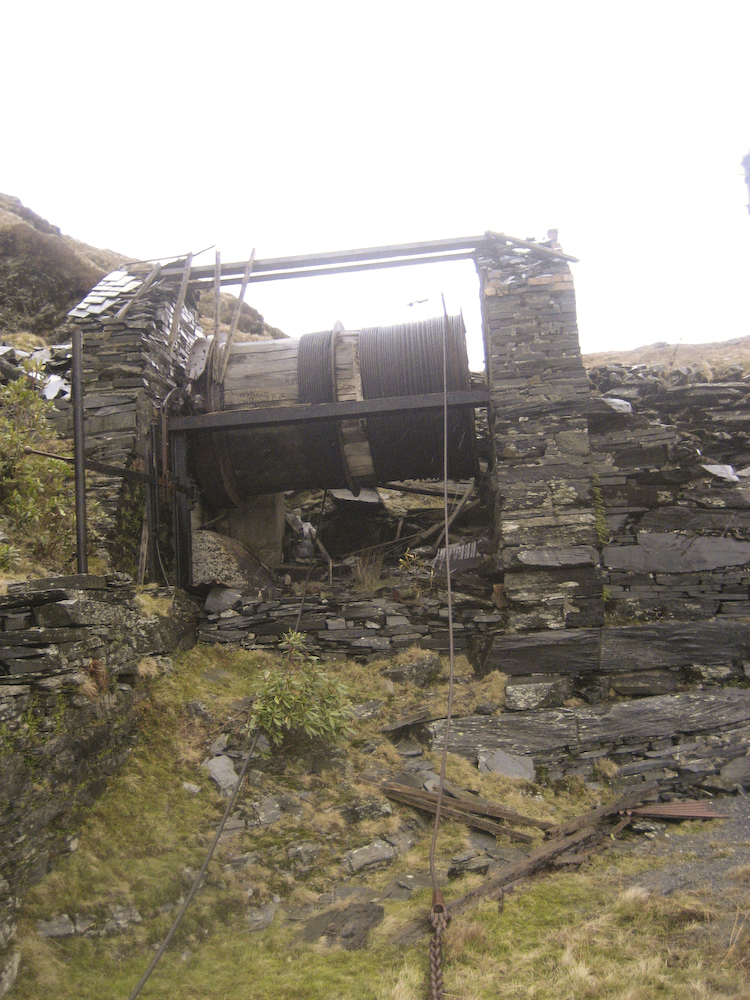
The remains of the winding house at the head of the Rhiwbach Tramway No. 2 incline, 2007

Level tracks are arranged above and below the gradient to allow wagons to be moved onto the incline either singly or in short rakes of two or more.

On the incline itself the tracks may be interlaced to reduce the width of land needed. This requires use of gauntlet track: either a single track of two rails, or a three-rail track where trains share a common rail; at the centre of the incline there will be a passing track to allow the ascending and descending trains to pass each other.

Railway workers attach the cable to the upper wagon, and detach it when it arrives at the other end of the incline. Generally, special-purpose safety couplings are used rather than the ordinary wagon couplings. The cables may be guided between the rails on the incline by a series of rollers so that they do not fall across the rail where they would be damaged by the wheels on the wagons.

Occasionally inclines were used to move locomotives between levels, but these were comparatively rare as it was normally cheaper to provide a separate fleet of locomotives on either side of the incline, or else to work the level sections with horses.

On early railways, cable-worked inclines were also used on some passenger lines.

=== Controls ===
The speed of the wagons was usually controlled by means of a brake that acted on the winding drum at the head of the incline. The incline cable passed round the drum several times to ensure there was sufficient friction for the brake to slow the rotation of the drum – and therefore the wagons – without the cable slipping.

At the head of the incline various devices were employed to ensure that wagons did not start to descend before they were attached to the cable. These ranged from simple lumps of rock wedged behind the wagon's wheels to permanently installed chocks that were mechanically synchronized with the drum braking system. At Maenofferen Quarry a system was installed that raised a short section of the rail at the head of the incline to prevent runaways.

The operation of an incline was typically controlled by the brakesman positioned at the winding house. A variety of systems were used to communicate with workers at the bottom of the incline, whose job it was to attach and detach the wagons from the incline cable. One of the most common communication methods was a simple electrical bell system.

=== Turnouts ===
Cable railways were often used within quarries to connect working levels. Sometimes a single cable railway would span multiple levels, allowing wagons to be moved between the furthest levels in a single movement. In order to accommodate intermediate levels, turnouts were used to allow wagons to leave and join the cable railway part way along its length. Various methods were used to achieve this.

One arrangement used at the Dinorwic Quarry was known as the "Ballast" method. This involved a two track incline with one track reserved for fully loaded wagons and the second used by partially loaded wagons. The line used by the partially loaded wagons was known as the "ballast" track and it had a stop placed on it part way down. The distance from the top of the incline to the stop was the same as the distance that the fully loaded wagons needed to travel. Empty wagons were hauled up the incline, counterbalanced by the descending ballast wagons. These empty wagons were replaced by fully loaded wagons ready to descend. The descending loaded wagons then returned the ballast wagons to the top of the incline. One of the major inclines at Dinorwic had four parallel tracks, two worked by the ballast method and two as conventional gravity balance.

=== Types ===
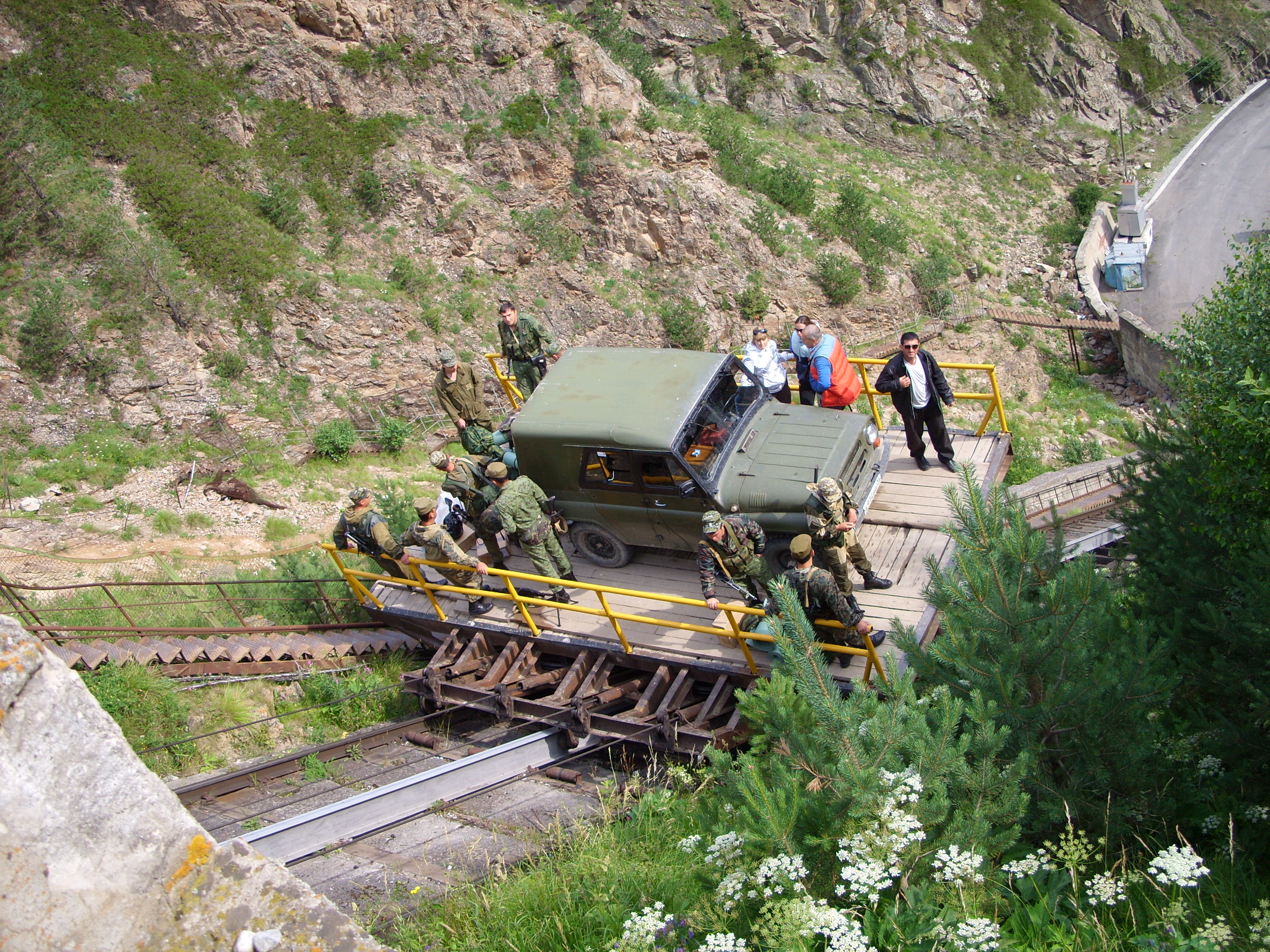
A stationary engine cable way at the Adyr-Su Gorge (Caucasus, Russia)

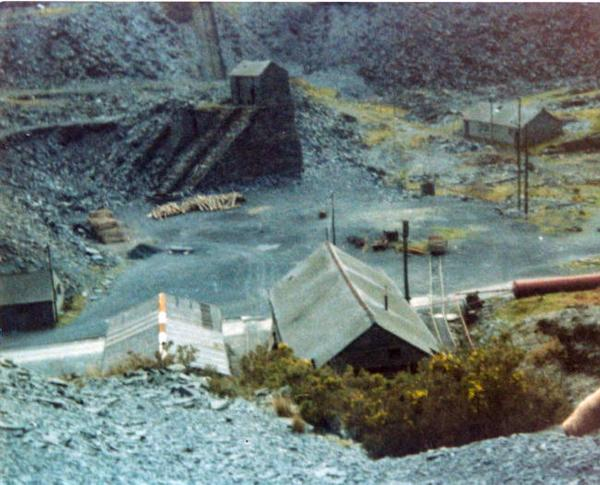
Aberllefenni Slate Quarry with a water balance incline in the background

Inclines are classified by the power source used to wind the cable.

==== Stationary engine ====
A stationary engine drives the winding drum that hauls the wagons to the top of the inclined plane and may provide braking for descending loads. Only a single track and cable is required for this type. The stationary engine may be a steam or internal combustion engine, or may be a water wheel.

==== Gravity balance ====
In a gravity balance system two parallel tracks are employed with ascending trains on one and descending trains on the adjacent track. A single cable is attached to both trains, wound round a winding drum at the top of the incline to provide braking. The weight of the loaded descending cars is used to lift the ascending empties.

This form of cable railway can only be used to move loads downhill and requires a wider space than a stationary engine-driven incline, but has the advantage of not requiring external power, and therefore costs less to operate.

==== Trwnc inclines ====
A variation of the gravity balance incline was the trwnc incline found at slate quarries in north Wales, notably the Dinorwic Quarry and several in Blaenau Ffestiniog. These were worked by gravity, but instead of the wagons running on their own wheels, permanently attached angled wagons were used that had a horizontal platform on which the slate wagons rode.

==== Water balance ====
This is a variant of the gravity balance incline that can be used to move loads uphill. A water tank is attached to the descending train. The tank is filled with water until the combined weight of the filled tank and train is greater than the weight of the loaded train that will be hauled uphill. The water is either carried in an additional water wagon attached to the descending train, or is carried underneath a trwnc car on which the empty train sits. This type of incline is especially associated with the Aberllefenni Slate Quarry that supplied the Corris Railway.

This form of incline has the advantages of a gravity balance system with the added ability to haul loads uphill. It is only practical where a large supply of water is available at the top of the incline. An example of this type of cable railway is the passenger carrying Lynton and Lynmouth Cliff Railway.

==== Locomotive-hauled ====
An uncommon form of cable railway uses locomotives, fitted with a winding drum, to power the cable. With the cable or chain attached to the wagons to be drawn, but the drive to the drum disengaged, the locomotive climbs the slope under its own power. When the cable is nearly at its full extent, or when the summit is reached, the locomotive is fastened to the rails and the cable wound in.

In a simpler form the cable is attached to a locomotive, usually at the upper end of the incline. The locomotive is driven away from the head of the incline, hauling wagons up the inclined plane. The locomotive itself does not travel on the steeply graded section. An example is at the Amberley Chalk Pits Museum. This is most commonly used for a temporary incline where setting up the infrastructure of a winding drum and stationary engine is not appropriate. It is similarly employed for recovery operations where derailed rolling stock must be hauled back to the permanent track.

== Non-inclined cable railways ==
While the majority of cable railways moved trains over steep inclines, there are examples of cable-haulage on railways that did not have steep grades. The Glasgow Subway was cable-hauled from its opening in 1896 until it was converted to electric power in 1935.

== Hybrid cable railways ==
A few examples exist of cables being used on conventional railways to assist locomotives on steep grades. The Cowlairs incline was an example of this, with a continuous rope used on this section from 1842 until 1908. The middle section of the Erkrath-Hochdahl Railway in Germany (1841–1926) had an inclined plane where trains were assisted by rope from a stationary engine and later a bank engine running on a second track. The height difference was 82 metres over a 2.5 kilometre length (1845–1926)

== Examples ==
- The Denniston Incline (1879–1967), north of Brunner, New Zealand, was gravity worked. It descended 518 m (1,699 ft) in a track distance of 1,670 m (5,479 ft), separated into two inclines, and during its life carried 13,000,000 t (12,794,685 long tons; 14,330,047 short tons) of coal.
- The Yosemite Valley Railroad operated a cable railway at Incline, California.
- The Duquesne Incline in Pittsburgh, Pennsylvania was completed in 1877, and is 800 ft (244 m) long and 400 ft (122 m) high.
- 1891 – The Johnstown Inclined Plane, in Johnstown, Pennsylvania, was completed following the Great Johnstown Flood of 1889. Dubbed the "World's Steepest Vehicular Inclined Plane", it is 896.5 ft (273.3 m) long, and ascends 502.2 ft (153.1 m) from the city valley to Westmont hilltop at a 70.9 percent grade.
- The São Paulo Railway in Brazil employed a series of five inclines to connect the port city of Santos to Rio Grande da Serra, rising 2,625 ft (800 m) in seven miles (11 km).

== Image gallery ==
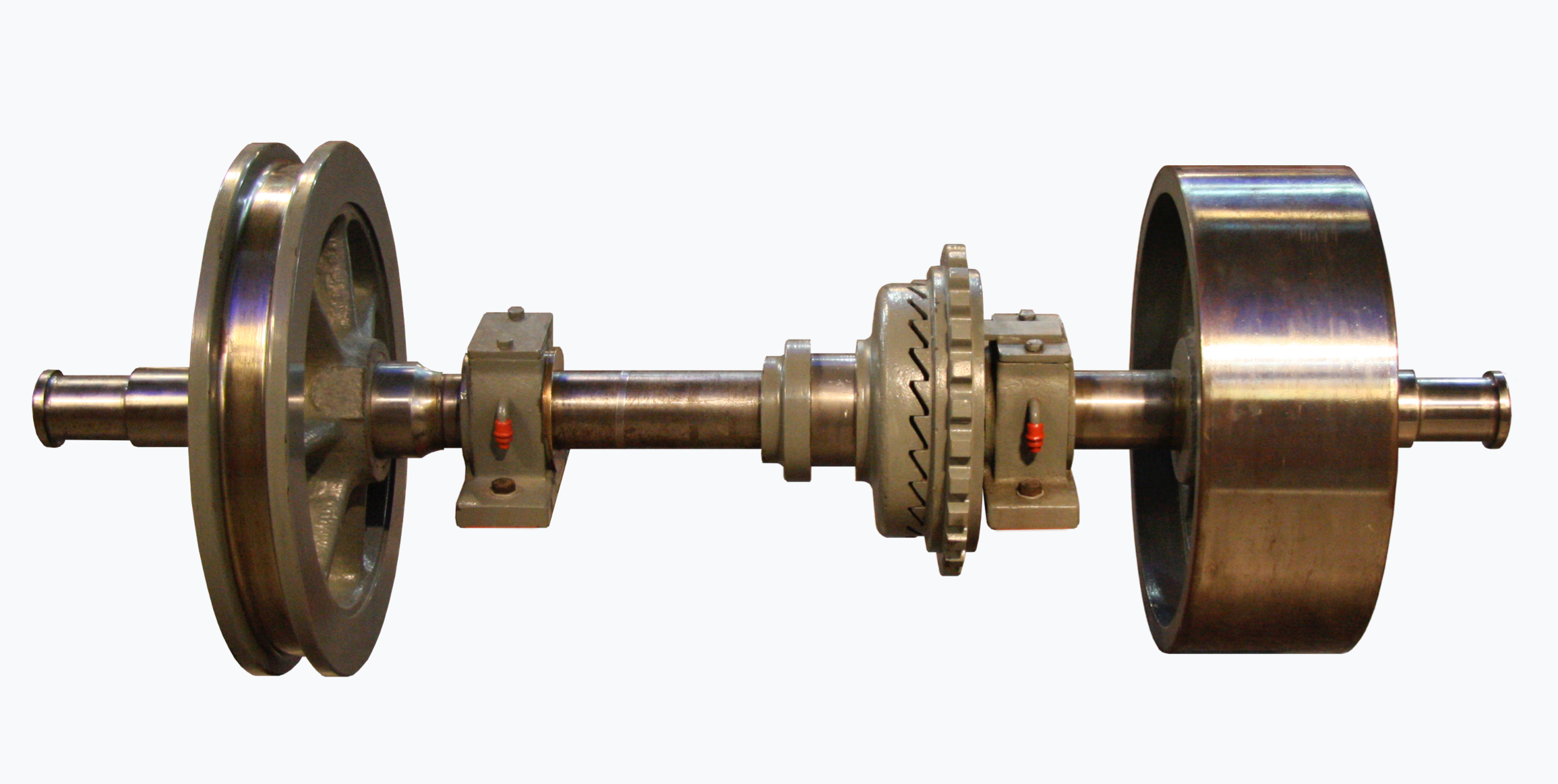
Wheelset of a two-rail funicular with the Abt switch turnout system

Abt switch

Track layouts used in cable railways – in the SVG file, click to move cars

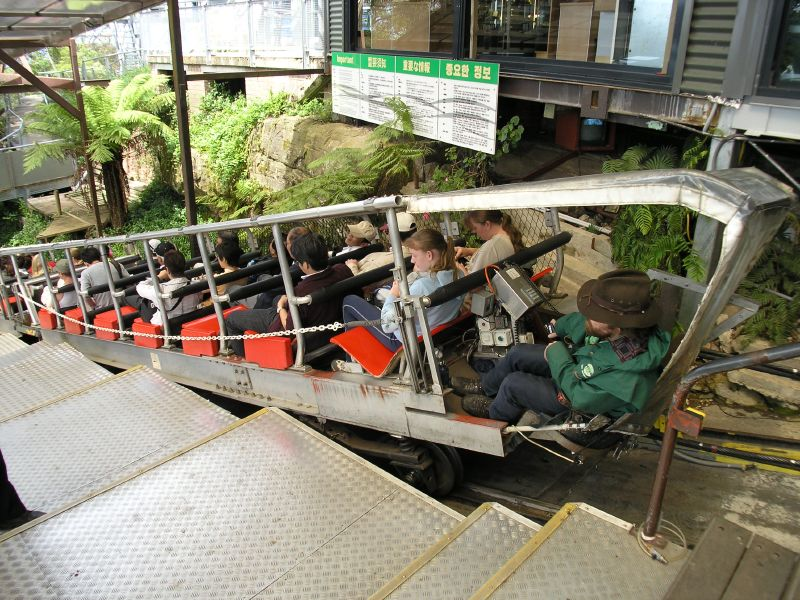
Katoomba Scenic Railway
originally hauled coal.

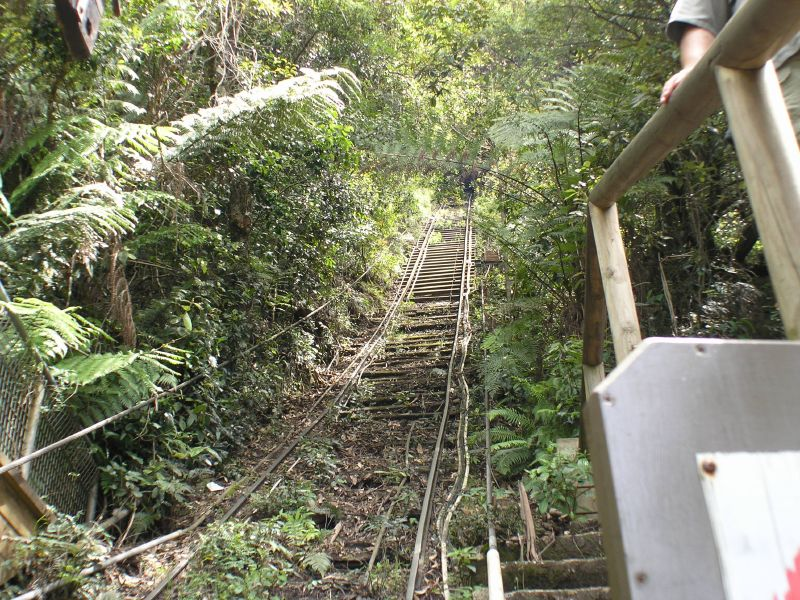
The 52° acute angle track

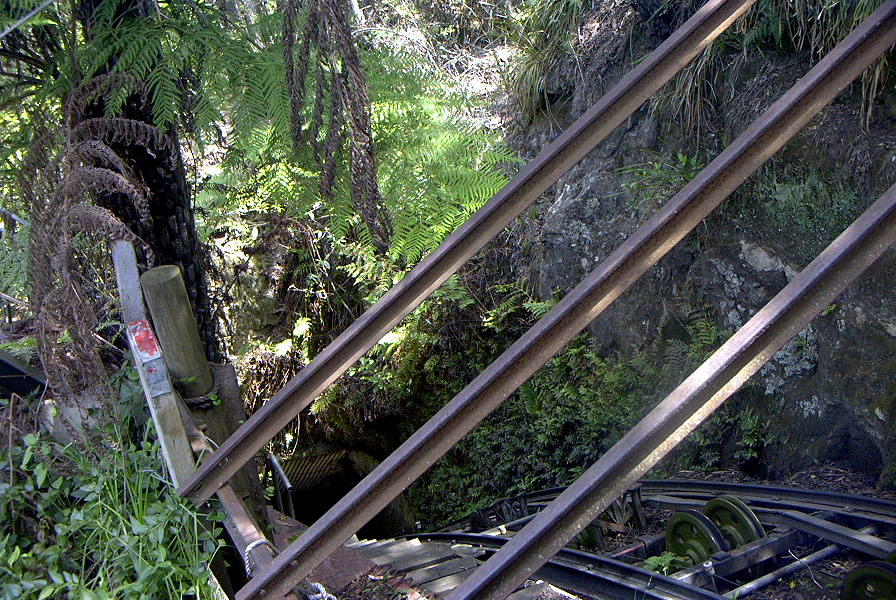
Katoomba Scenic Railway descending to the valley floor

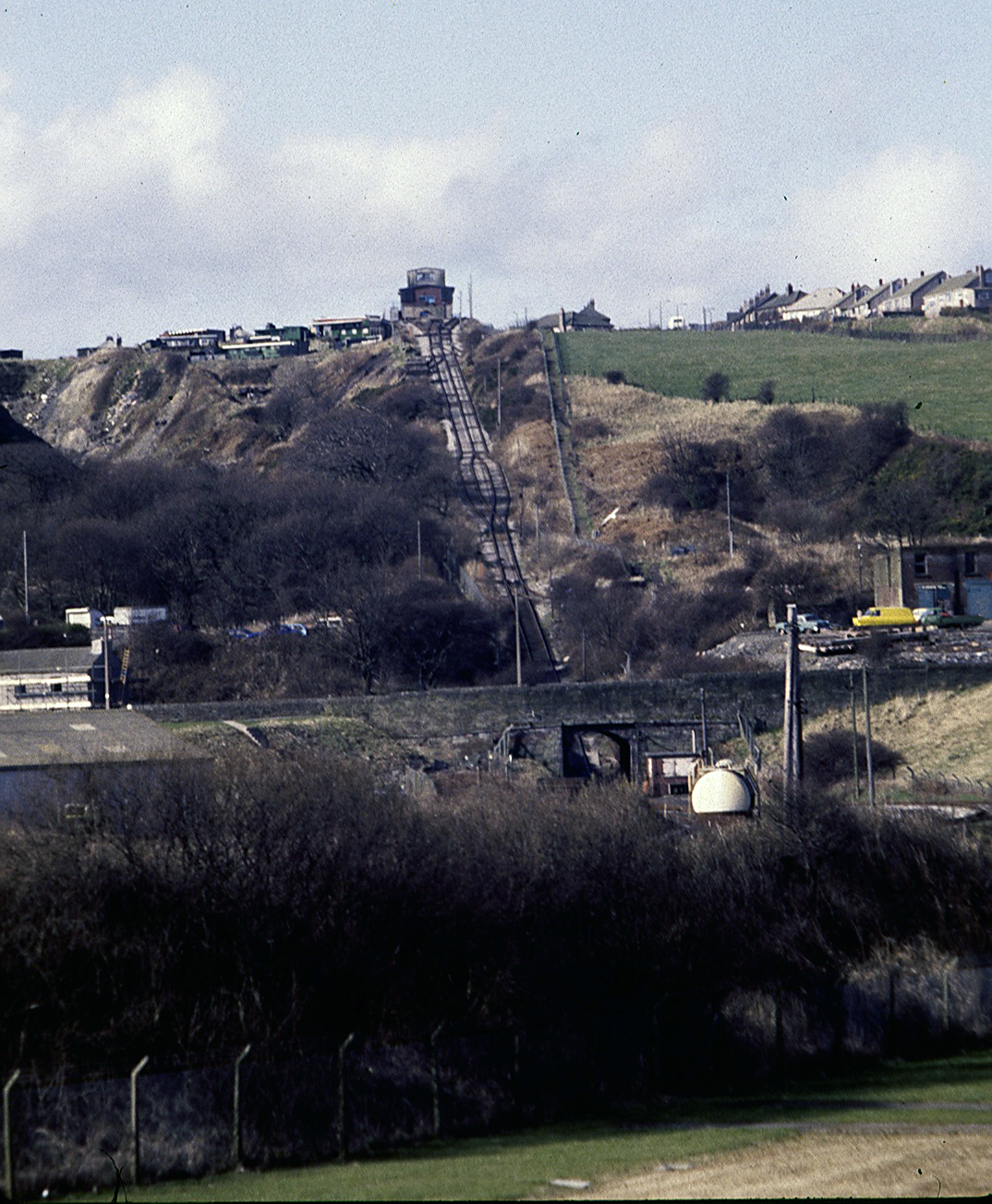
The "Corkicle Brake", Whitehaven 1881–1986: the last operating commercial roped incline in the U.K.

== See also ==
- Blondin (quarry equipment)
- Cable ferry
- Cable Liner
- Grade (slope)
- Incline elevator
- Rack railways
- Ruling gradient
- Steep grade railway
