= Reisszug =

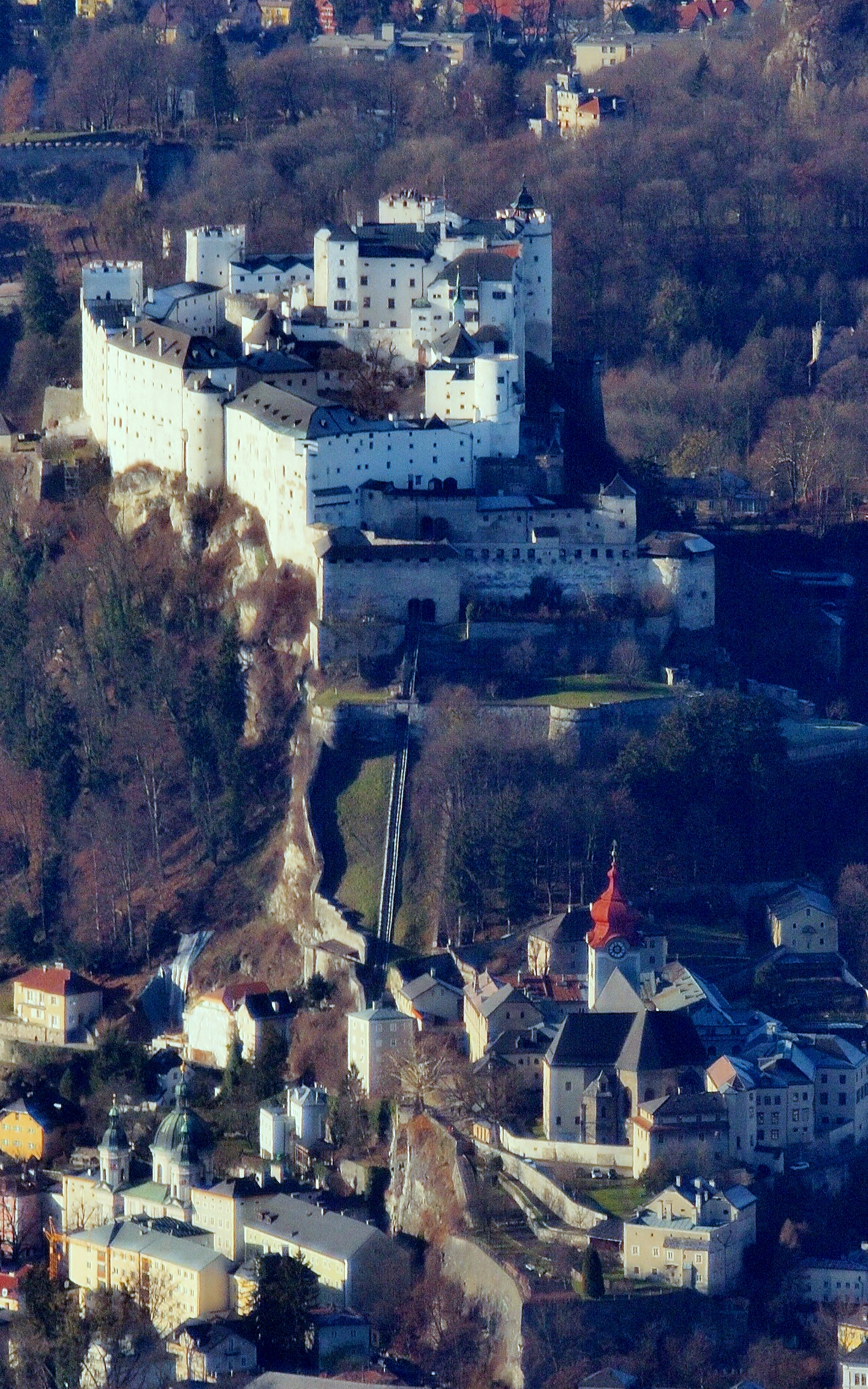
- The Hohensalzburg Castle, with the lower route of the Reiszug picked out by two parallel vertical walls, whilst the gateways on the upper route can just be seen

Overview
- Locale: Salzburg, Austria
- Coordinates: 47.795388°N 13.050162°E
- Termini: Nonnberg (lower station); Festung (upper station)
- Stations: 2

Service
- Type: Cable railway

History
- Opened: c. 1500

Technical
- Line length: 191 metres (627 ft)
- Track gauge: 1,300 mm (4 ft 3 3/16 in)
- Maximum incline: 67%

The Reisszug (also spelt Reißzug or Reiszug) is a private cable railway providing goods access to the Hohensalzburg Castle at Salzburg in Austria. It is notable for its extreme age, as it is believed to date back to 1460. A wall for its protection was erected in 1461 and a source mentions it in 1515.

The Reisszug should not be confused with the Festungsbahn, a funicular that provides public access to the Hohensalzburg Castle, and which dates from 1892.

== History ==
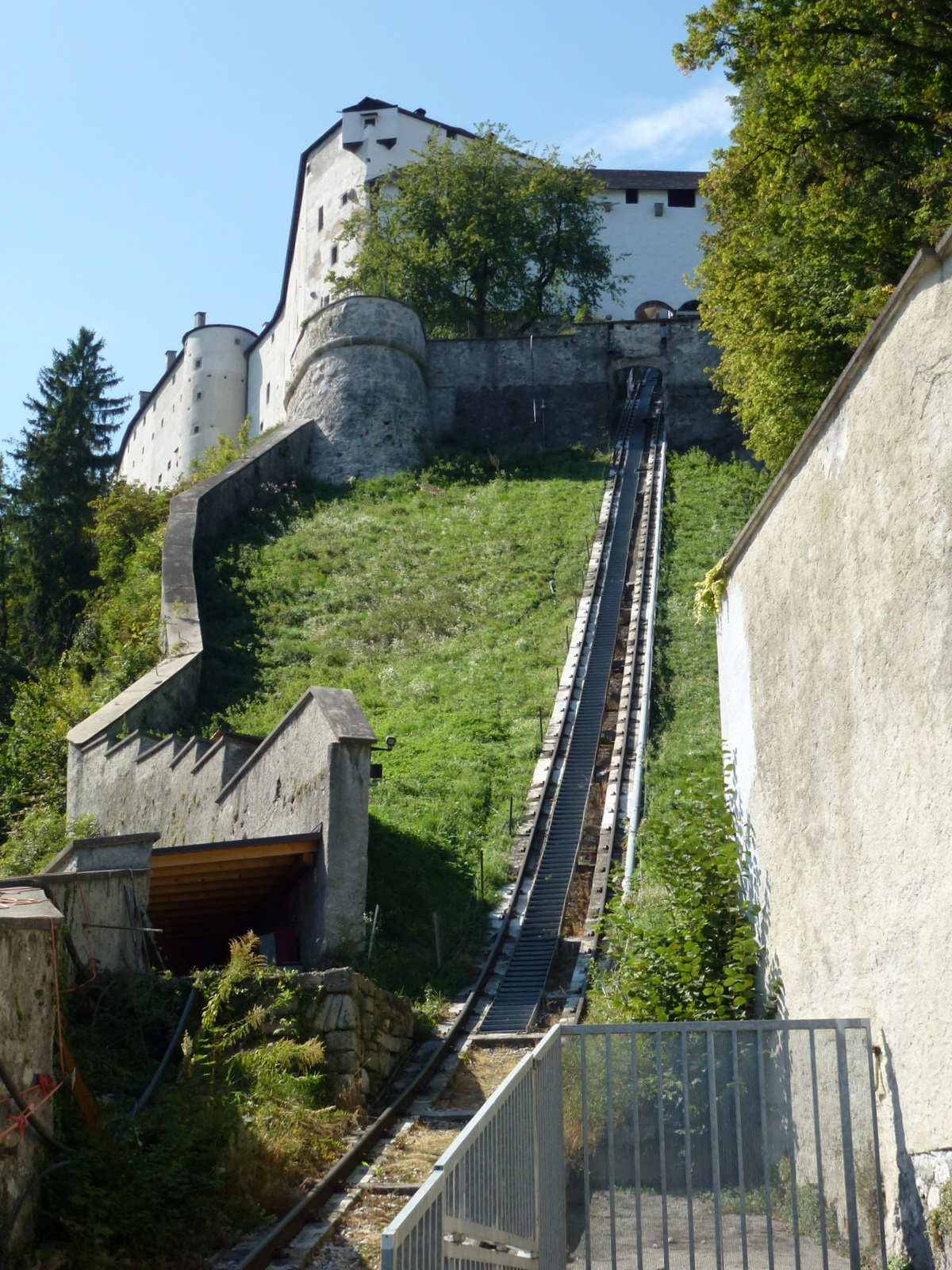
View of the route from below

The line was first documented in 1515 by Matthäus Cardinal Lang, who would later become Archbishop of Salzburg. These dates would make it the oldest cable railway still in existence, and possibly the oldest existing railway. It has been claimed as the oldest funicular railway, although in the absence of evidence that it ever used a counterweight, this is debatable.

The Reisszug still traces its original route through the castle's fortifications. It starts from the grounds of the Nonnberg Abbey, below the eastern walls of the castle. It then rises up at a gradient of 65% to the central courtyard of the fortress, on its way passing through five concentric defensive walls. At the point where the line passes through each wall is a gateway, each of which can be closed by a sturdy wooden door. The presence and obvious age of the gateways serves to confirm Cardinal Lang's description of the line.

The line may have originally used sled-style runners, but wooden rails and wheels were soon adopted. Haulage was accomplished by a hemp rope. Until 1910 the line was operated by human or animal power. Over the years the line has been modified and rebuilt several times, most recently between 1988 and 1990. Today it uses steel rails and a steel cable. Traction is provided by an electric motor, and a closed-circuit-television system is used to monitor its operation.

== Technical parameters ==
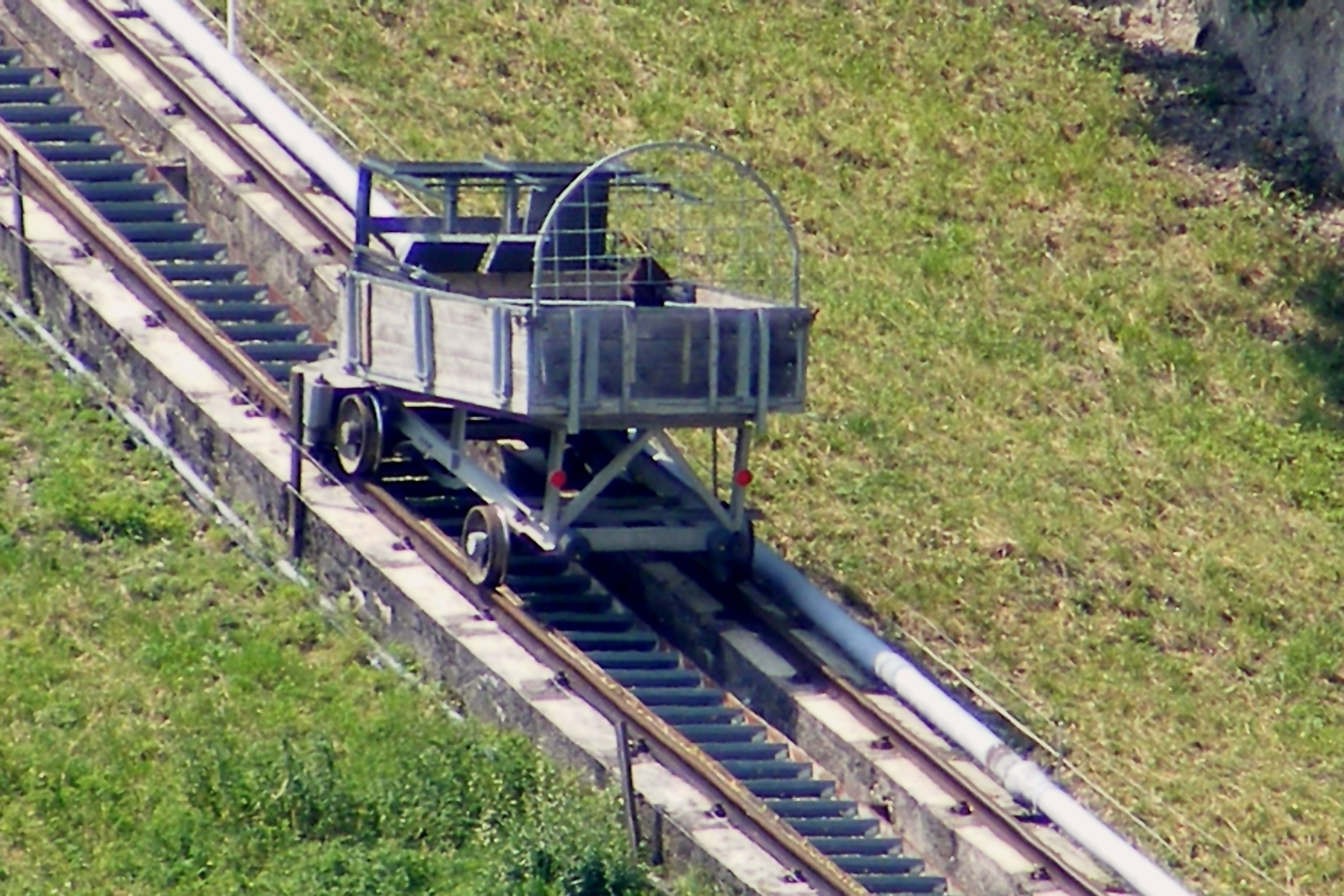
The Reisszug car

In its current incarnation, the line has the following technical parameters:

Configuration	Single track
Mode of operation	Manual
Length	190 metres (620 ft)
Height	80 metres (260 ft)
Maximum Steepness	67%
Stations: 2	Nonnberg (47.795571°N 13.050654°E, lower); Festung (47.795817°N 13.048546°E, upper)
Cars	1
Capacity	3 passengers/2,500 kilograms (5,500 lb)
Gauge	1,300 mm (4 ft 3 3/16 in)
Maximum speed	0.5 metres per second (1.6 ft/s)
Journey time	5 minutes 45 seconds
Traction	Electricity

== See also ==
- Salzburg S-Bahn
