= Arno Lehmann =

German-Austrian ceramicist, sculptor and painter

- Born: 23 May 1905; Berlin, Germany
- Died: 11 May 1973 (aged 67); Salzburg, Austria
- Known for: Sculpture, ceramics, painting
- Notable work: Weiße Gazelle, Schwarze Gazelle, Stier, Der Weg, Fuge von Bach

Arno Lehmann (23 May 1905 – 11 May 1973) was a German ceramicist, sculptor and painter who spent most of his productive time in Austria.

== Life and work ==
He was born on 23 May 1905 in Berlin where he spent his youth and his first creative phase. In 1945, his studio and entire work were destroyed in the bombing raids of Berlin. He found refuge in Austria. In 1949, he moved in to the Hohensalzburg Castle, high over the roofs of the city of Salzburg, where he made his studio and lived for the rest of his life.

Lehmann is well-known for his animal sculptures. He experimented with techniques, forms and glazing and created his own distinctive style. In the late 1950s, he was inspired by abstract art. He incorporated the ideas of cubism and used also metal, wire, wood and paper in his artworks.

Arno Lehmann belongs to the greatest ceramicists of the 20th century. In 1955, Lehmann's ceramic sculpture of a gazelle was part of the exhibition Chefs-d'oeuvre de la céramique moderne in Cannes and was awarded the gold medal by the International Academy of Ceramics (the jury was chaired by Pablo Picasso).

In 2007–2008, the Salzburg Museum held a retrospective exhibition of Arno Lehmann's work.

Among his notable works are the animal sculptures Weiße Gazelle (1953), Schwarze Gazelle (1955), Stier (1953), sculptures Der Weg (1957) and Fuge von Bach.

== Legacy ==
There is an award named after Lehmann. The Salzburg state gives the „Arno Lehmann Preis für Keramik“ (Arno Lehmann Award for Ceramics) to the best ceramicists.
