= Leonhard von Keutschach =

Prince-Archbishop of Salzburg

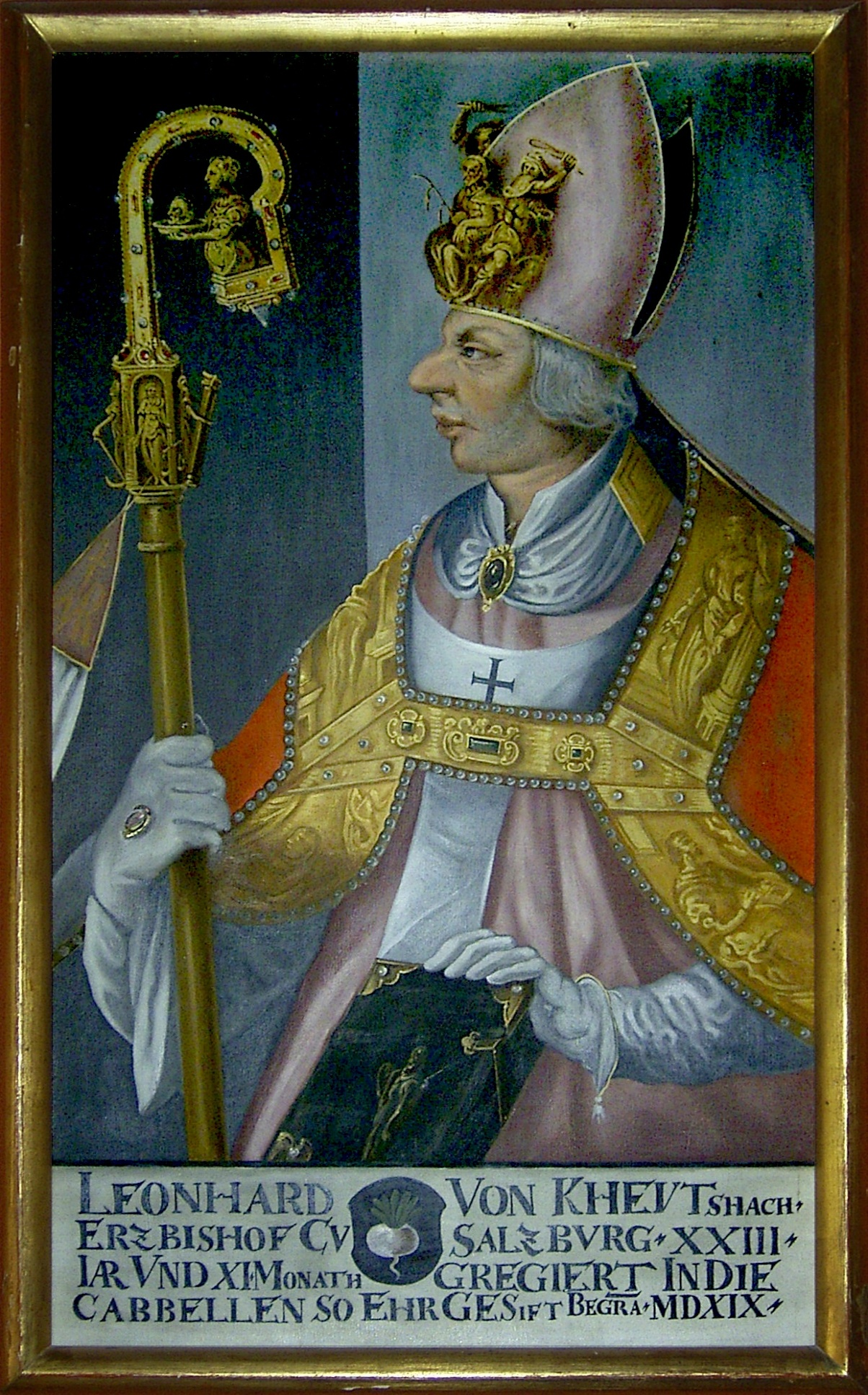
Prince-Archbishop Leonhard von Keutschach

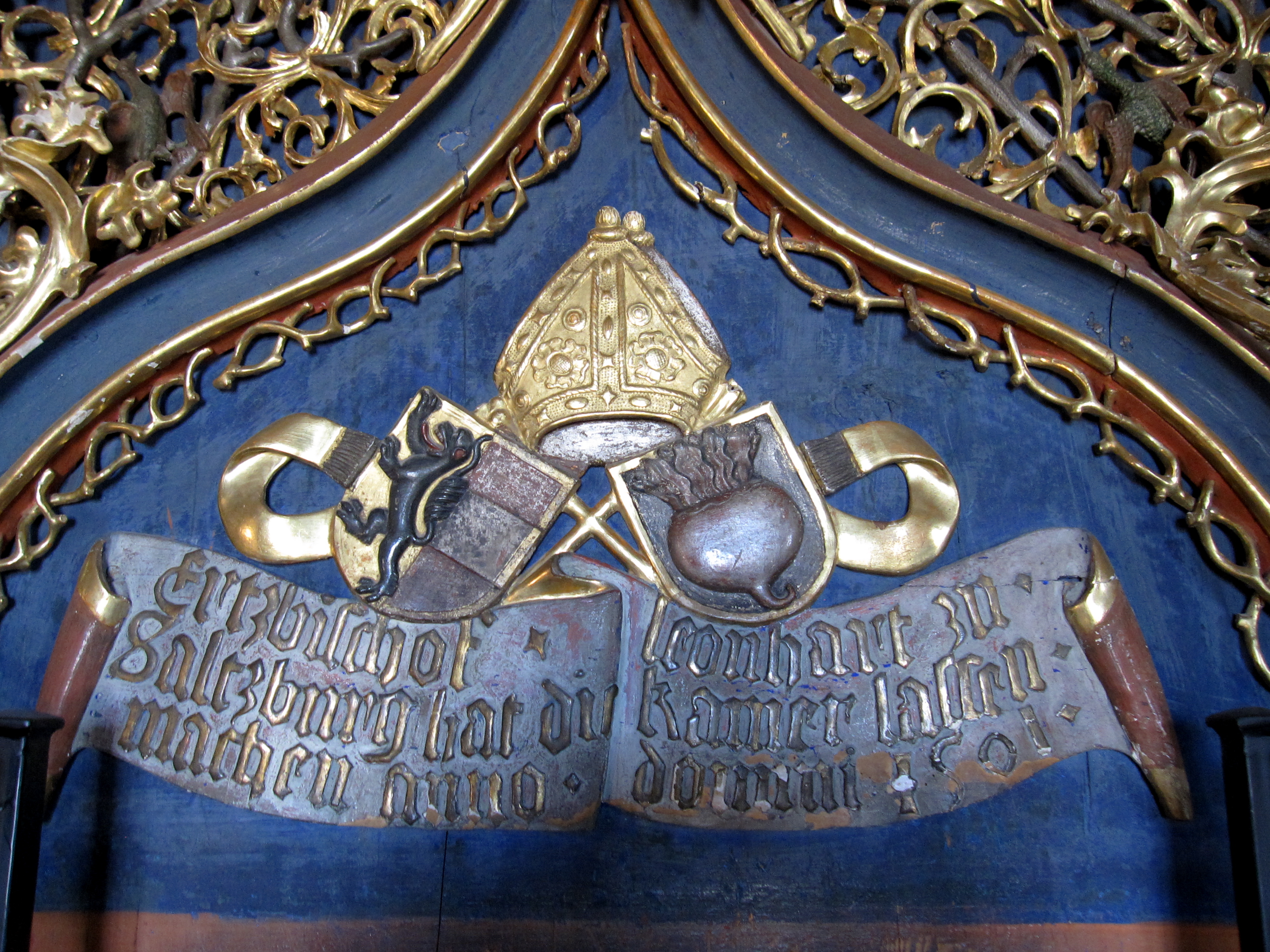
Coat of arms (right) of Leonhard von Keutschach, in his bedchamber in Hohensalzburg Castle

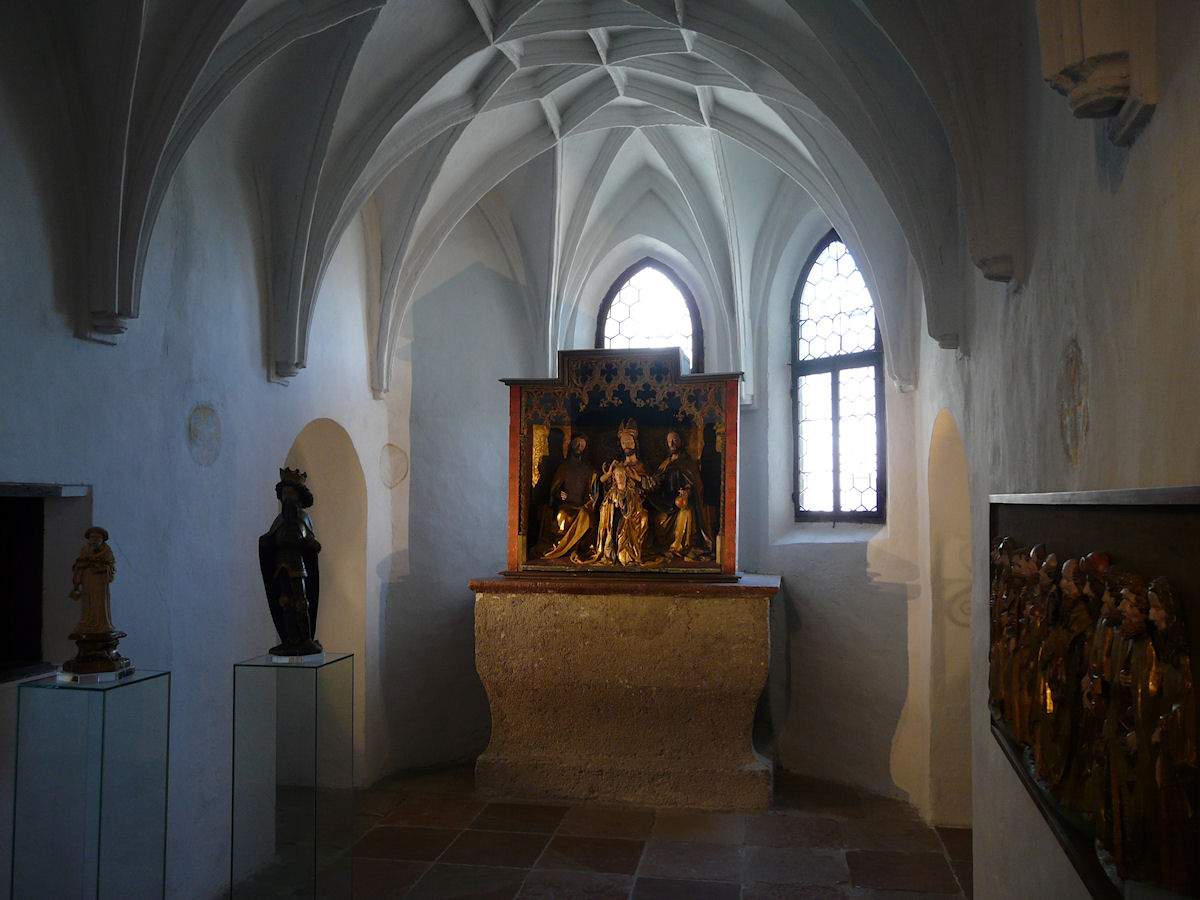
Chapel of Leonhard von Keutschach in Hohensalzburg Castle

Leonhard von Keutschach (c. 1442 – 8 June 1519) was Prince-Archbishop of Salzburg from 1495 until his death, the last to rule in the feudal style.

== Biography ==
He was probably born at Viktring in Carinthia, the son of Otto von Keutschach, a judge at the manorial court (Hofrichter), and Gertrud von Möderndorf. The Keutschach family came from the northern shore of Lake Keutschach. Their arms are a white turnip on a black field.

Leonhard started out as canon of the Augustinian order and provost of Eberndorf Abbey. In 1490 he was promoted as provost of the Salzburg chapter and in 1495 was elected prince-archbishop. In 1498 he again expelled the Salzburg Jews, who had returned to the area since their banishment in 1404, and had their synagogues at Salzburg and Hallein destroyed.

The City of Salzburg was politically unstable, after in 1481 Emperor Frederick III of Habsburg had granted its citizens the privilege to elect its own council and mayor, which was the cause of a protracted struggle with the ruling archbishops. In 1511, Leonhard ended the unrest: He invited the mayor and councillors for a gala dinner, had them imprisoned and forced them to renounce their rights. He proceeded to cement his position with nepotism, nominating relatives in key positions; he however had to accept Matthäus Lang von Wellenburg, a former secretary of Emperor Maximilian I of Habsburg as coadjutor bishop. Leonhard died at Salzburg, spending his last years unsuccessfully battling his coadjutor, who would succeed him in 1519.

Leonhard was an effective ruler, he reformed the archbishopric's finances, paying off old debts and developing the economy by farming out, increasing the salt production, the silver and gold mines and promoting trade. His efforts made Salzburg one of the richest states of the Holy Roman Empire, starting a long tradition of a local culture rich in music and art. Leonhard also used his wealth to buy back lands sold by his predecessors to cover their debt and to support Emperor Maximilian I financially, which brought further economic and political advantages. He expanded the defenses of the city, notably by strengthening Hohensalzburg Castle and a large number of castles in Salzburg and Carinthia. He ordered the construction of river dams around Hallein to protect the city from spring floods, but he also had the Radstädter Tauern Pass road and a number of new long distance routes constructed to promote trade. He crowned his economic achievements by a coinage reform (Rübentaler) that was the basis for the modern Salzburger monetary system.

A decree promulgated by Archbishop Leonhard in 1504 was one of the earliest actions in Europe to officially protect threatened animal species, including the northern bald ibis, which nevertheless became extinct in Central Europe.

== Literature ==
- Franz Ortner: Salzburgs Bischöfe in der Geschichte des Landes 696-2005; Peter Lang, Frankfurt am Main 2005; ISBN 3-631-53654-2
- Heinz Dopsch, Hans Spatzenegger (Hrsg.): Geschichte Salzburgs, Stadt und Land, Band 1, Teil 1, Vorgeschichte, Altertum, Mittelalter. Verlag Pustet, Salzburg 1981, ISBN 3-7025-0121-5
