= Festungsbahn (Salzburg) =

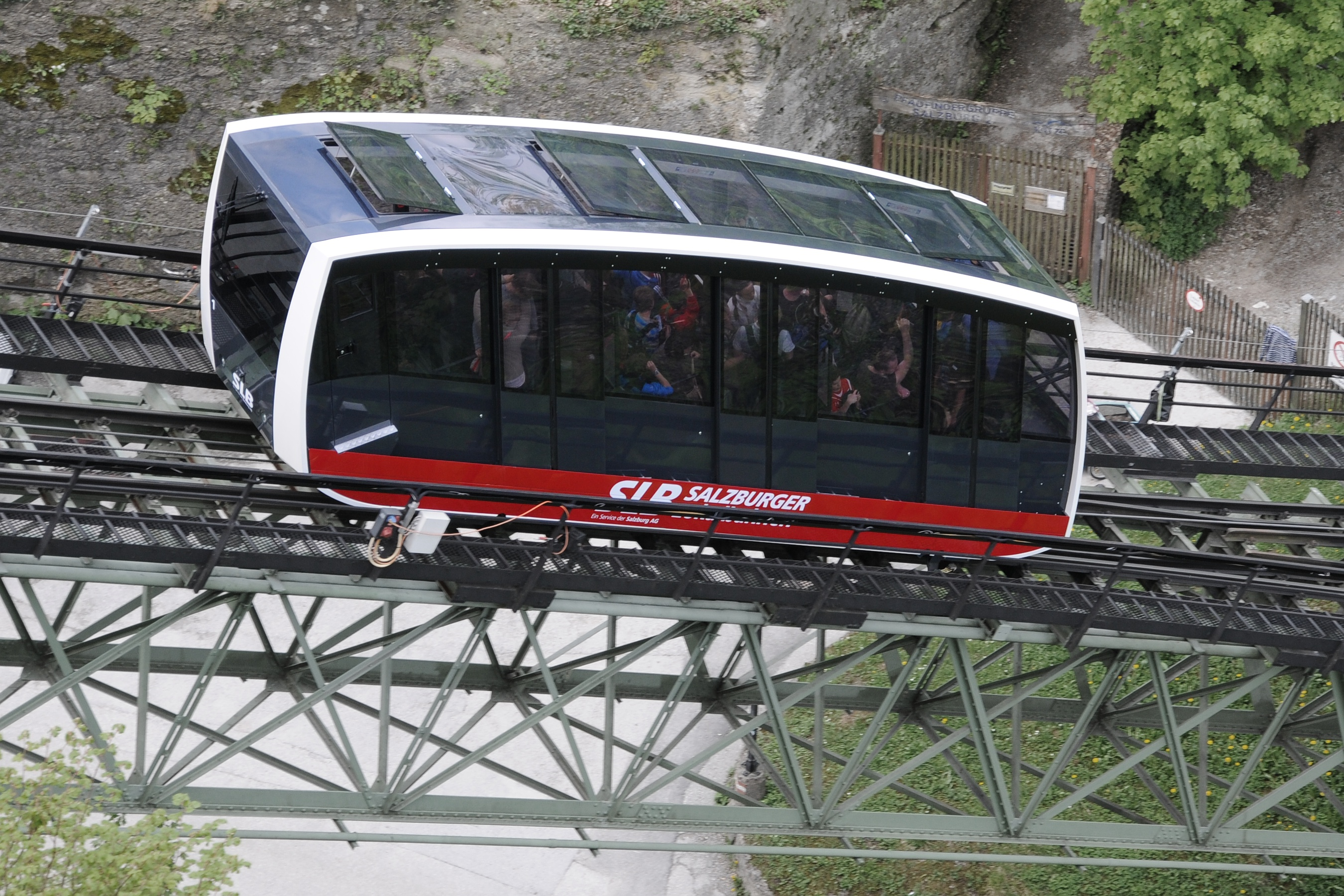
- One of the latest cars, dating from 2011

Overview
- Owner: Salzburg AG
- Coordinates: 47.795701°N 13.04619°E

Service
- Type: Funicular

History
- Opened: 1892

Technical
- Line length: 191 metres (627 ft)
- Track gauge: 1,040 mm (3 ft 5 in)
- Maximum incline: 62%

The Festungsbahn is a funicular railway providing access to Hohensalzburg Fortress in Salzburg municipality in Austria. It links the fortress with Festungsgasse, below the northern side of the fortress's walls. The Festungsbahn opened in 1892, and should not be confused with the much older Reisszug line that provides goods access to the castle.

The line is operated by Salzburg AG, who also operate the city's buses and the Salzburger Lokalbahn.

== History ==
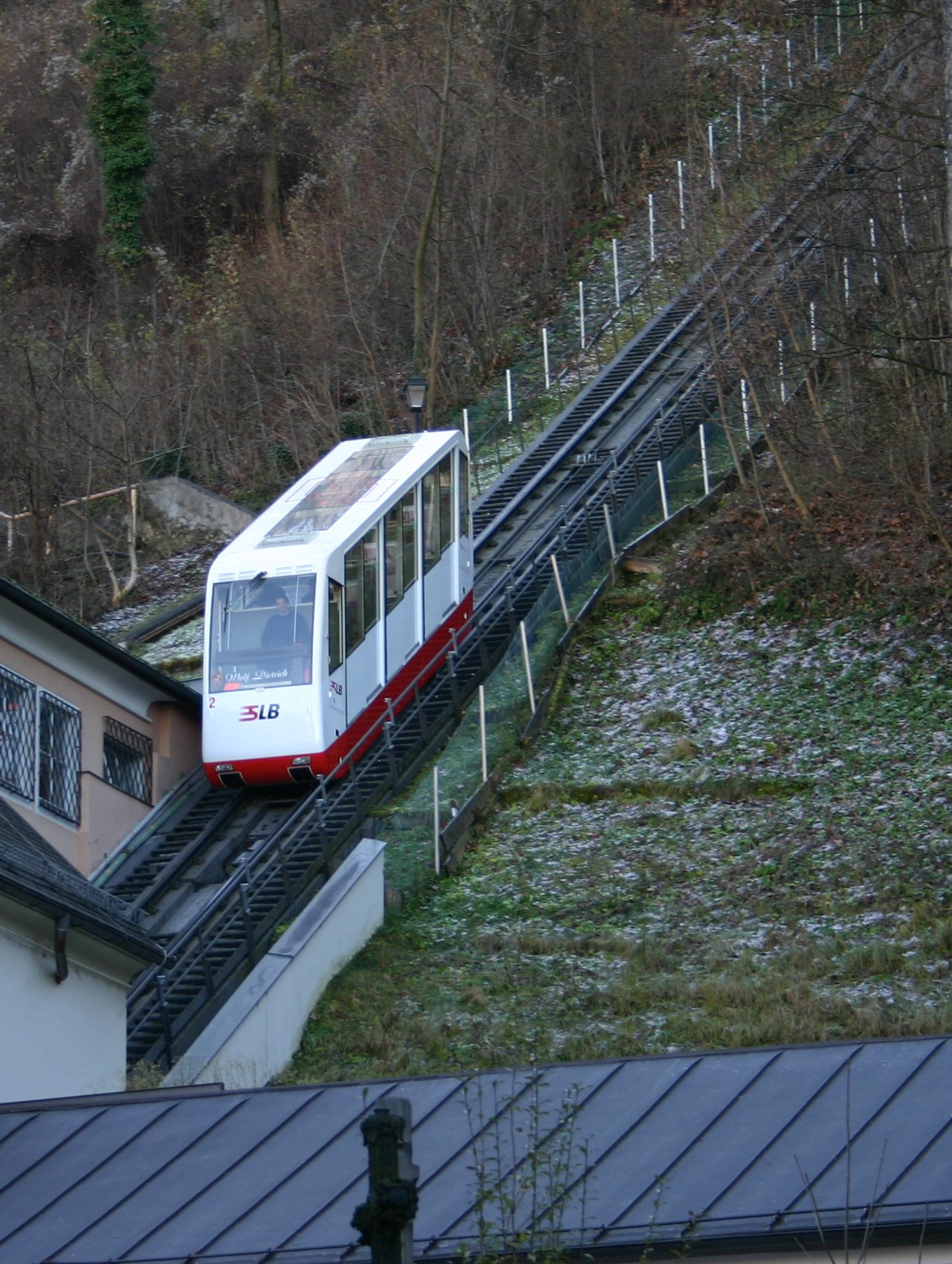
The previous generation of car in use in 2008

The Festungsbahn opened in 1892 as a water balance funicular operated by the Salzburger Eisenbahn- und Tramwaygesellschaft. Previously used as barracks, the line made the fortress available to a broader range of visitors.

The line was rebuilt with new cars and an electric drive in 1960, whilst the lower and upper stations were rebuilt in 1975 and 1976 respectively. In 1991 the line was again modernised, with the provision of new cars with an increased passenger capacity and a faster line speed.

Between January and April 2011, the funicular was again modernized, at a cost of €4 million. Two new vehicles were provided and the electrical equipment replaced. Panoramic windows offer a better view of the city.

== Operation ==
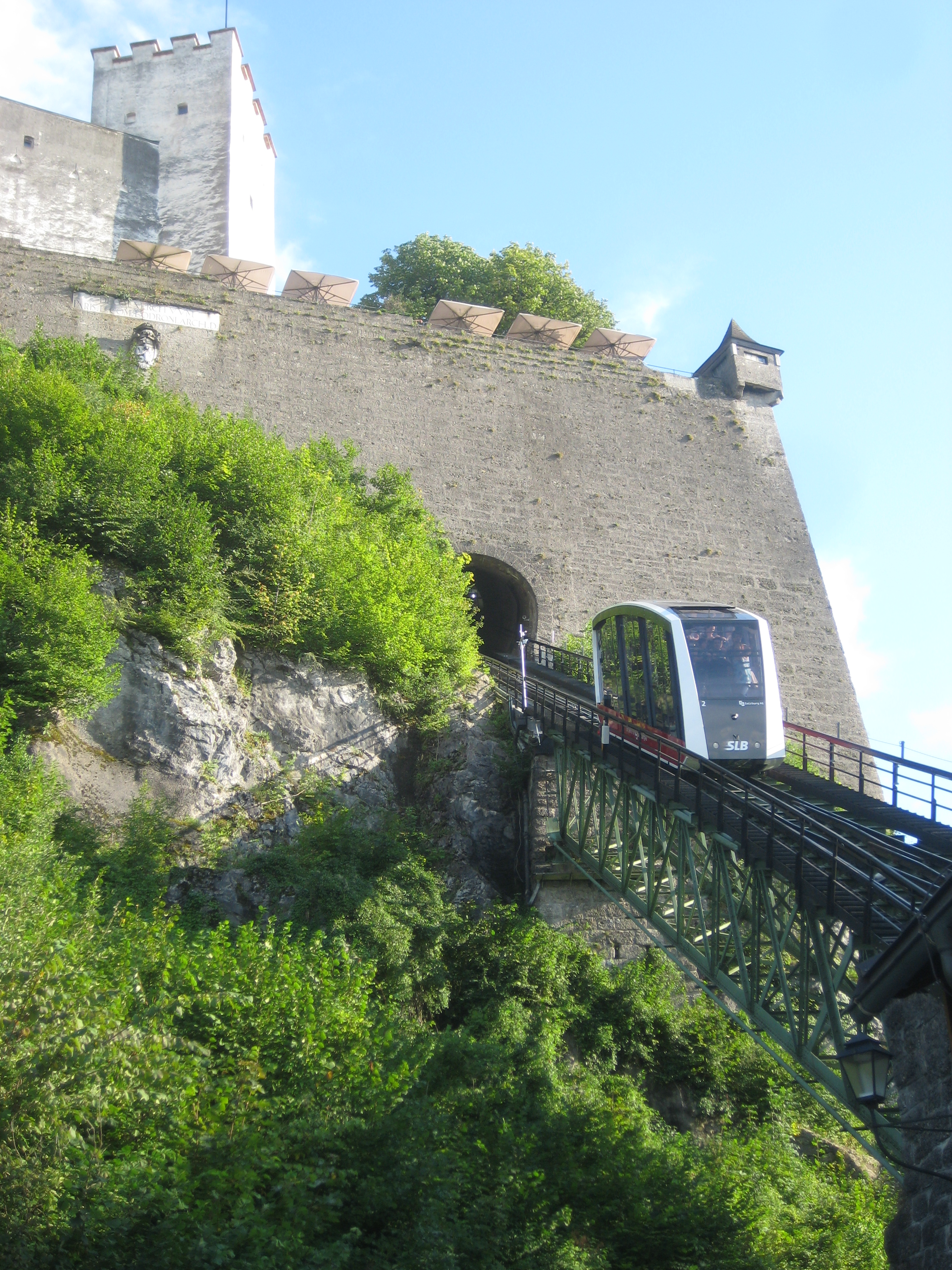
Car approaching the upper station

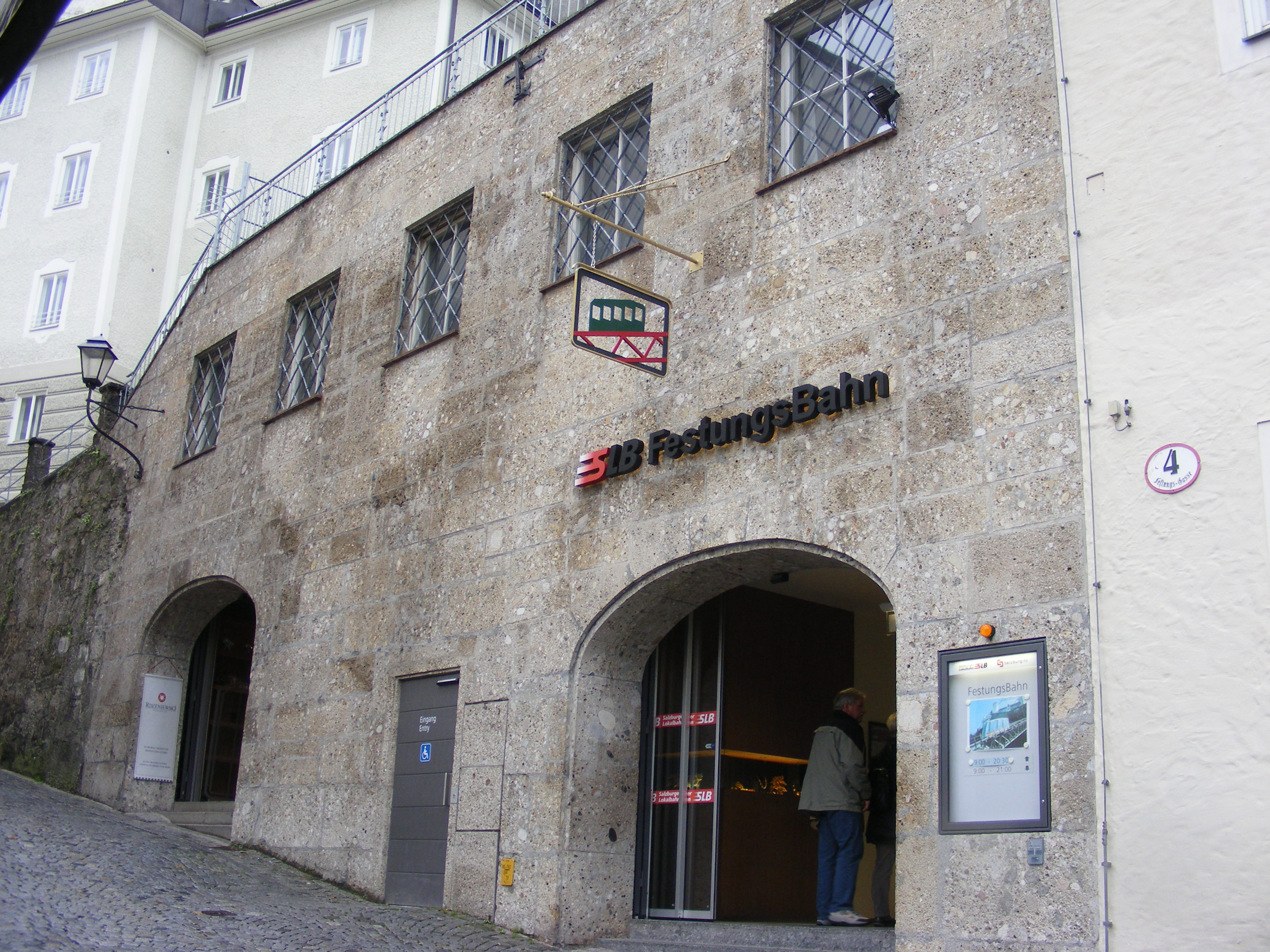
Entrance to the lower station

The line operates every day from 09:00. The time of the last car varies from 17:00 to 22:00 depending on the time of year.

The line has the following technical parameters:

Configuration	Single track with passing loop
Length	191 metres (627 ft)
Height	99 metres (325 ft)
Maximum Steepness	62%
Stations: 2	Dom (47.796440°N 13.046041°E, lower); Festung (47.795761°N 13.046179°E, upper)
Cars	2
Capacity	55 passengers per car
Gauge	1,040 mm (3 ft 5 in)
Maximum speed	5.5 metres per second (18 ft/s)
Journey time	1 minute
Traction	Electricity

== See also ==
- Salzburg S-Bahn
