= Hohensalzburg Fortress =

Medieval fortress in Salzburg, Austria

- German: Festung Hohensalzburg
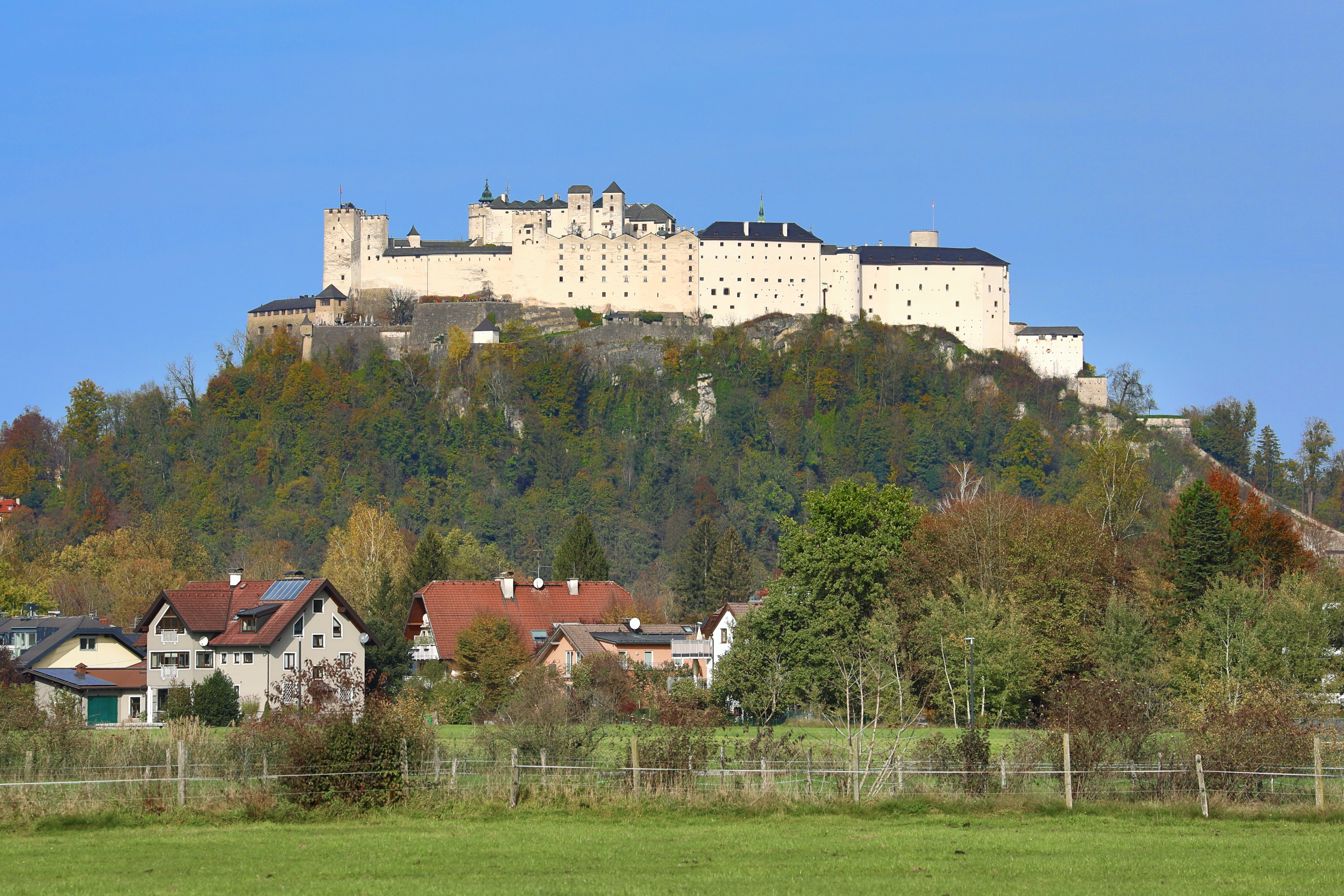
- Hohensalzburg Fortress

- Location within Austria

General information
- Type: Fortress
- Location: Salzburg, Austria
- Coordinates: 47°47′42″N 13°02′50″E
- Construction started: 1077

Hohensalzburg Fortress (German: Festung Hohensalzburg, lit. 'High Salzburg Fortress') is a large medieval fortress in the city of Salzburg, Austria. It sits atop the Festungsberg mountain at an altitude of 506 m. It was erected at the behest of the prince-archbishops of Salzburg. The fortress is 250 m (820 ft) long and 150 m (490 ft) wide making it one of the largest medieval castles in Europe.

== History ==
=== Early history ===
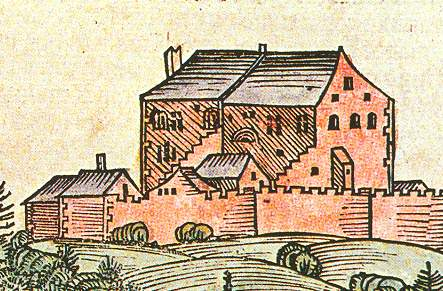
One of the earliest depictions of the castle in the 1460s, from the Schedel'sche Weltchronik

Archaeological excavations have shown that a Roman fort existed at the highest point of the site. This should not be confused with the more significant Roman castrum superius on the Nonnberg terrace.

Construction of the current fortress began in 1077 under Archbishop Gebhard von Helfenstein. The original design was a basic bailey with a wooden wall. In the Holy Roman Empire, the archbishops of Salzburg were already powerful political figures and they expanded the fortress to protect their interests. Helfenstein's conflict with Emperor Henry IV during the Investiture Controversy influenced the expansion of the fortress, with the Archbishop taking the side of Pope Gregory VII and the German anti-king Rudolf of Rheinfelden. The fortress was gradually expanded during the following centuries. The ring walls and towers were built in 1462 under Prince-Archbishop Burkhard II von Weißpriach.

Prince-Archbishop Leonhard von Keutschach further expanded the fortress during his term from 1495 until 1519. His coadjutor Matthäus Lang von Wellenburg, who was later to succeed Leonhard, in 1515 wrote a description of the Reisszug, a very early and primitive funicular railway that provided freight access to the upper courtyard of the fortress. The line still exists, albeit in updated form, and is probably the oldest operational railway in the world. The current external bastions, begun in the 16th century and completed in the 17th, were added as a precaution because of fears of Turkish invasion.

The only time that the fortress actually came under siege was during the German Peasants' War in 1525, when a group of miners, farmers and townspeople tried to oust Prince-Archbishop Matthäus Lang, but failed to take the fortress. In 1617 the deposed Archbishop Wolf Dietrich von Raitenau died in the fortress prison. During the Thirty Years' War, Archbishop Count Paris of Lodron strengthened the town's defenses, including Hohensalzburg. He added various parts to the fortress, such as the gunpowder stores and additional gatehouses. The fortress was surrendered without a fight to French troops under General Jean Victor Marie Moreau during the Napoleonic War of the Second Coalition in 1800 and the last Prince-Archbishop Count Hieronymus von Colloredo fled to Vienna. In the 19th century, it was used as barracks, storage depot and dungeon before being abandoned as a military outpost in 1861.

=== Recent history ===
Hohensalzburg Fortress was refurbished from the late 19th century onwards and became a major tourist attraction with the Festungsbahn funicular railway, opened in 1892, leading up from the town to the Hasengrabenbastei; It stands today as one of the best preserved castles in Europe.

During the early 20th century it was used as a prison, holding Italian prisoners of war during World War I and Nazi activists before Germany's annexation of Austria in March 1938.

German ceramicist, sculptor and painter Arno Lehmann lived and worked in Hohensalzburg Fortress from 1949 until his death in 1973.

Hohensalzburg Fortress was selected as main motif for the Austrian Nonnberg Abbey commemorative coin minted on April 5, 2006. This was the first coin of the series "Great Abbeys of Austria". It shows the Benedictine convent of Nonnberg Abbey. In the hilltop on the background, the fortress and the Kajetaner church can be seen. Also in 1977 the Austrian Mint issued a coin for the 900th anniversary of Hohensalzburg Fortress.

== Interior ==
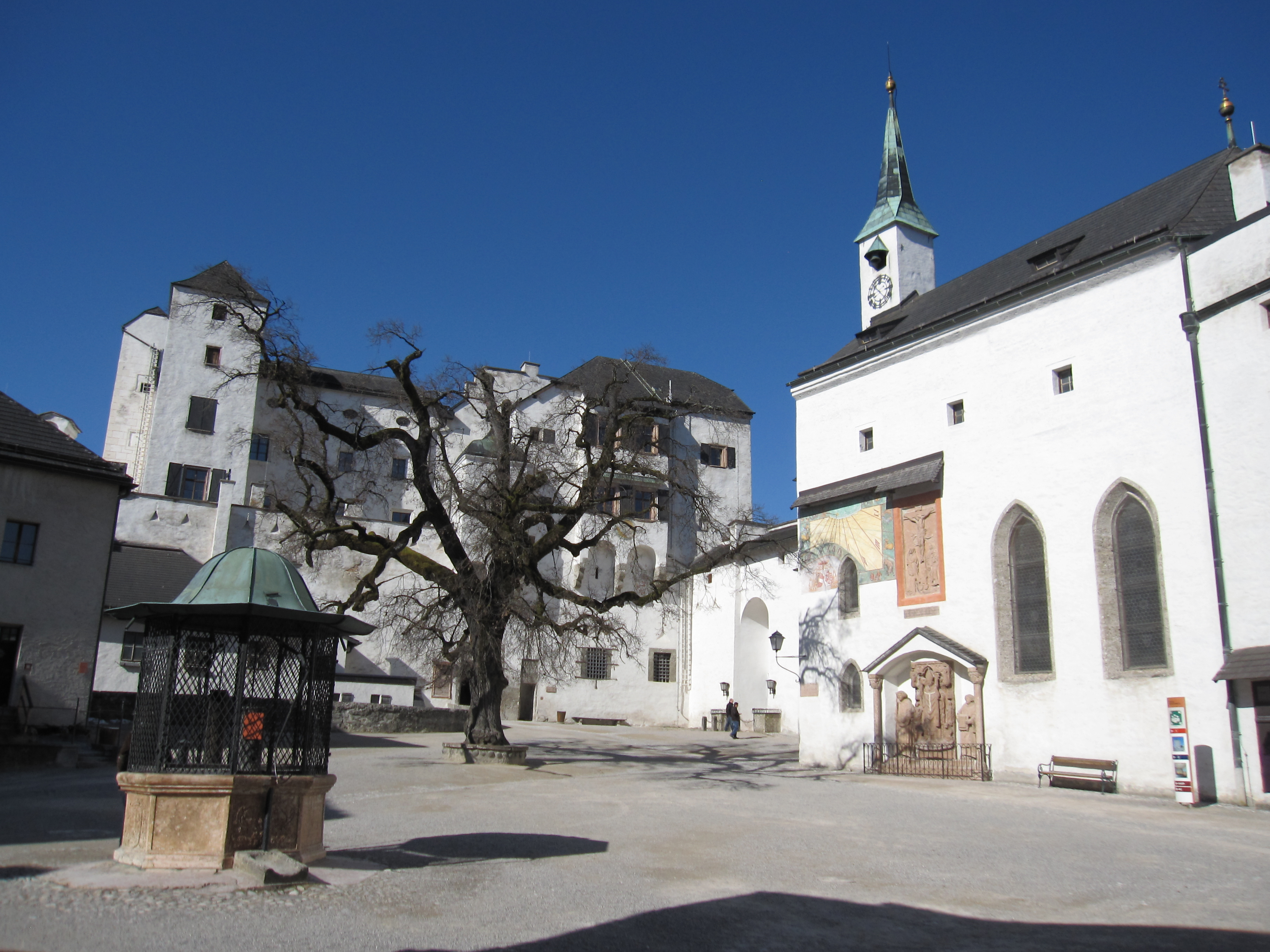
Inner courtyard towards the Hohe Stock and St. George's Chapel

The fortress consists of various wings and courtyard. The Prince-Bishop's apartments are located in the so-called "Hoher Stock" (upper floor).

=== Salzburg Bull ===
The Krautturm houses a large aerophon of more than 200 pipes which is called the "Salzburg Bull" (Salzburger Stier). This huge mechanical organ was built in 1502 by Archbishop Leonhard von Keutschach. It was renewed by Rochus Egedacher in 1735.

From Palm Sunday to 31 October the "Salzburg Bull" is played daily at 7, 11 and 18 o'clock. The aerophone thus initiated the playing of the carillon at the Residenzplatz and ended it again.

One of Austria's most famous cabaret groups is named after it.

=== Golden Hall ===
Starting in 1498, Archbishop Leonhard von Keutschach had the magnificent state apartments installed on the third floor. The rooms in which the archbishops would normally have lived were one floor below. The state apartments were primarily used for representative purposes and for festivities. The Golden Hall was richly decorated and indicates that the fortress served the archbishops not only as a refuge in times of crisis, but frequently also as a residence up to the 16th century.

In order to gain more space, Archbishop Leonhard von Keutschach had four massive marble pillars constructed on the right-hand outer wall and had a loggia added on. As in the other rooms the ceiling is coffered, each coffer being adorned with gold buttons symbolising the stars in the sky.

The 17-metre-long beam, supporting the ceiling, is particularly worth mentioning. The coat of arms of Leonhard von Keutschach together with those of the Holy Roman Empire, the most powerful German towns and the bishoprics that were connected to Salzburg, are painted on it.

=== Chapel of Archbishop Leonhard von Keutschach ===
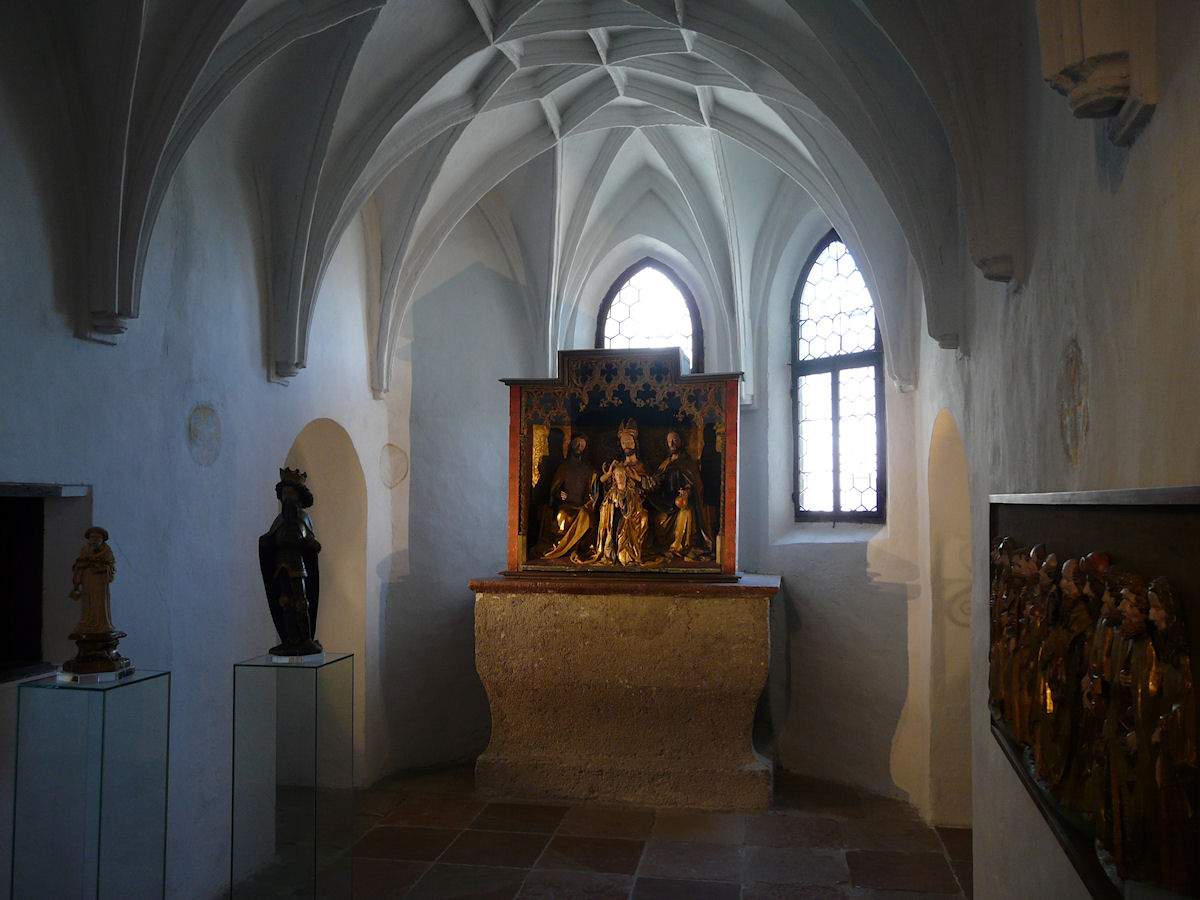
Chapel of archbishop Leonhard von Keutschach

Archbishop Leonhard von Keutschach (1495-1519) had the chapel built at a later time. One of the figure consoles in the beam ceiling had to be removed to make room for it. A richly ornamented star vault decorates the ceiling of the chapel. The inner part of the door at the entrance is covered with stucco. The painted frame shows red columns on a high plinth with grey capitals. The coat of arms of Salzburg and of Leonhard von Keutschach is reproduced in the tympanum beneath the mitre, legate cross and sword. A special feature of the coat of arms is the turnip and in many places in the fortress this can be found as an indication of prince-archbishop Keutschach's building activity. In the north wall of the chapel there are two openings which made it possible to attend the church service from the side room.

=== Golden Chamber ===
The Golden Chamber is the most magnificently furnished room of the princely chambers. The two long walls are taken up by benches that are richly decorated with vines, grapes, foliage and animals. These benches used to be covered with cloth or leather, but the upholstery has not survived into the modern age. The walls also used to be covered in gold-embossed leather tapestry which adorned the lower part of the wall.

=== Bedchamber ===
The bedchamber is the most intimate room of the princely chambers. The original furniture and precious textiles, such as tapestry, were in the course of time replaced by more "modern" ones. The elaborate wainscoting to keep out the cold still bears witness to the splendour of the past. The upper part of the panels is decorated with gilded buttons and rosettes, whereas the lower part, which is bare today, was probably covered with leather or velvet tapestry. The door conceals a toilet, which is basically a hole in the floor with a wooden frame. At the time of construction, this was a highly modern sanitary facility.

== Gallery ==
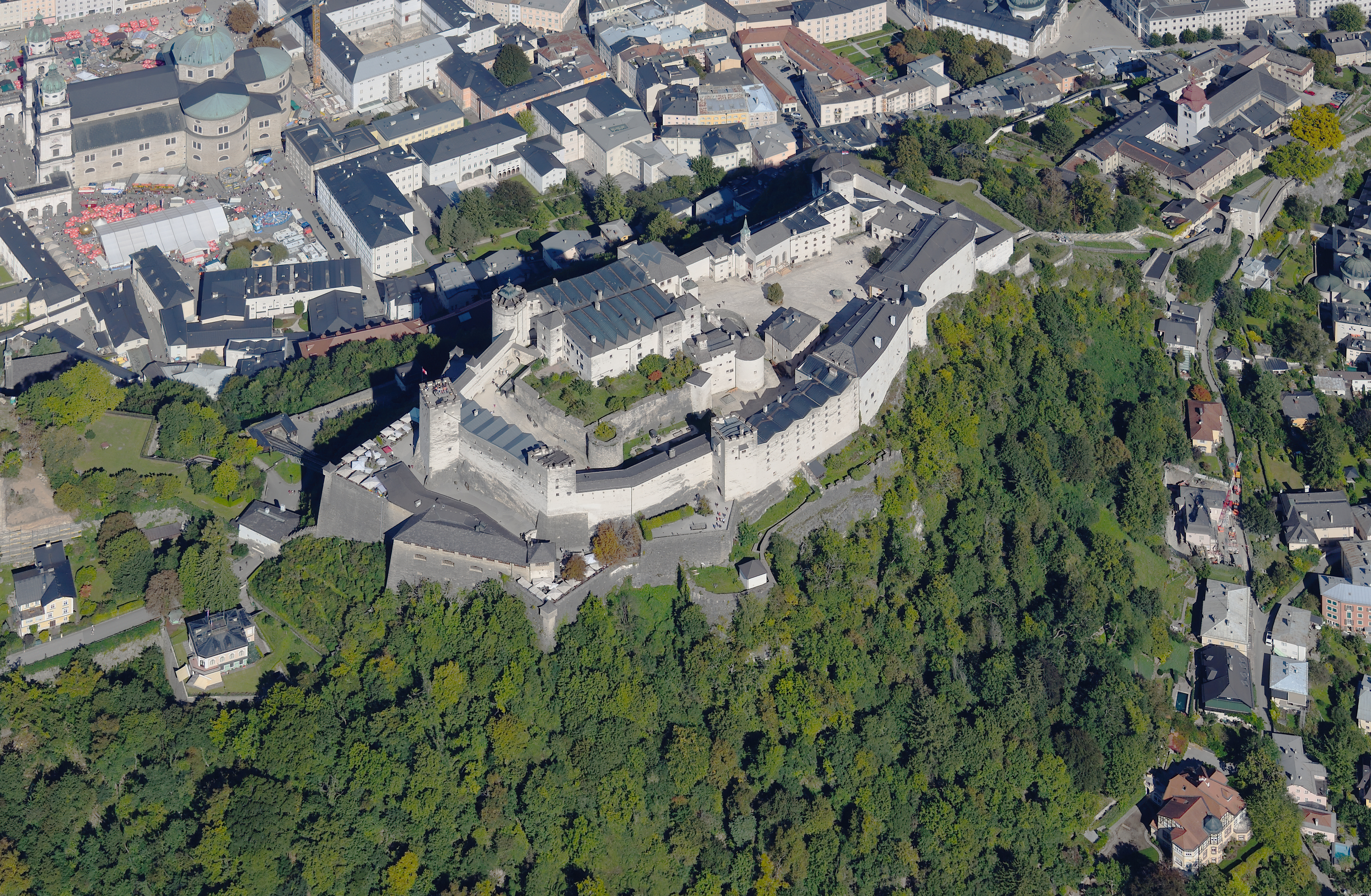
Aerial view

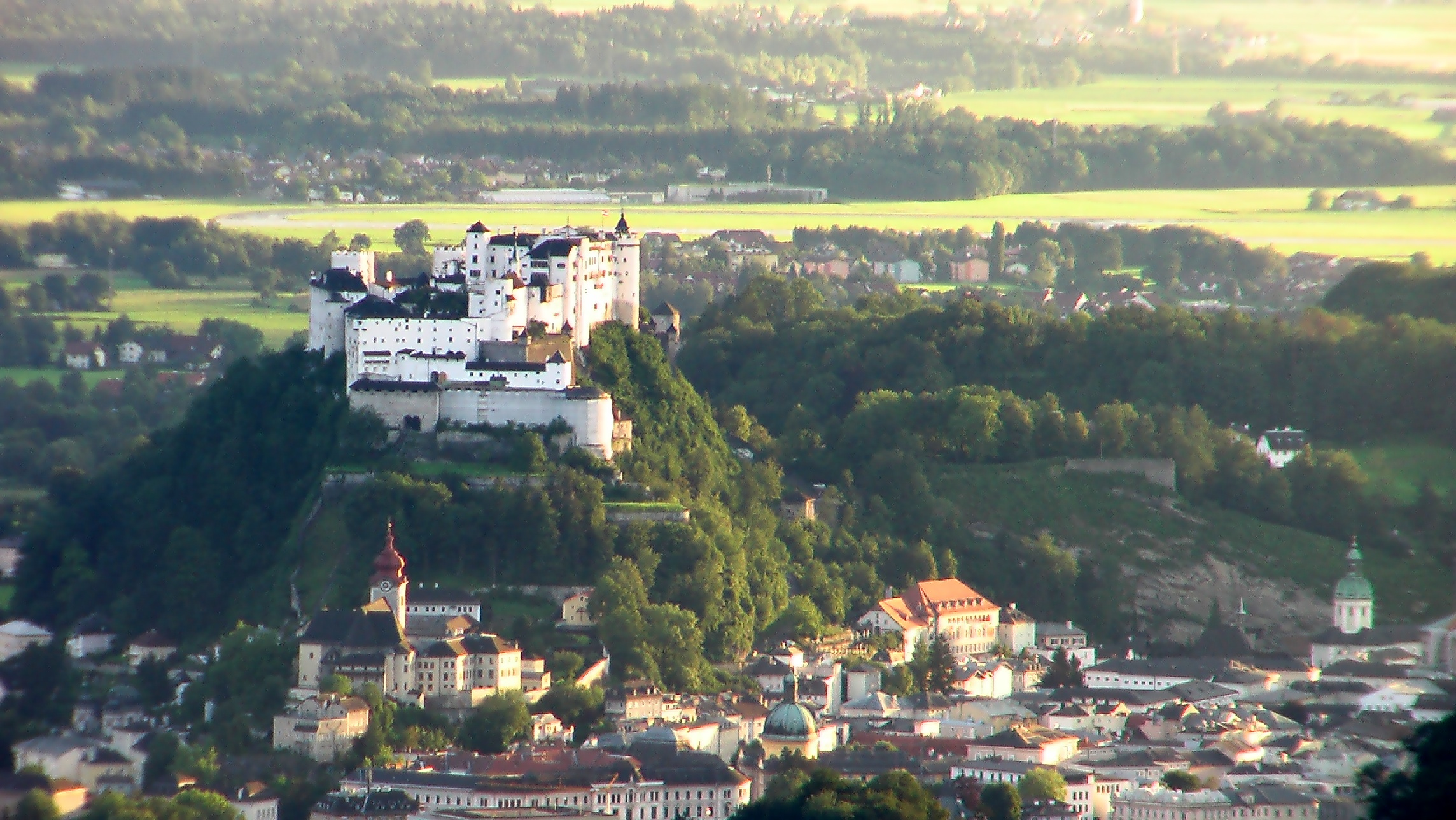
Hohensalzburg Fortress and Salzburg, view from "Gersberg Alm"

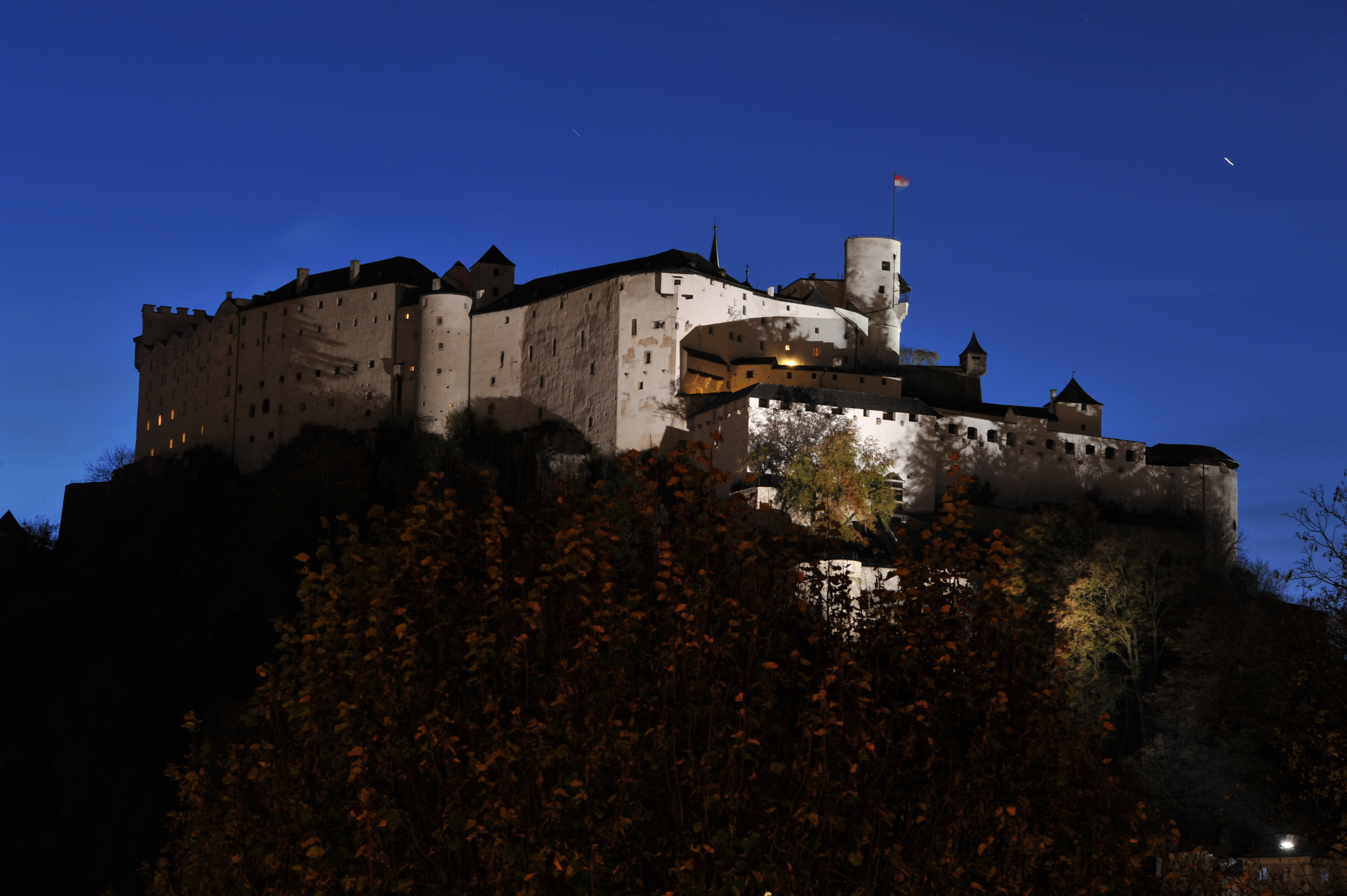
Hohensalzburg Fortress at night

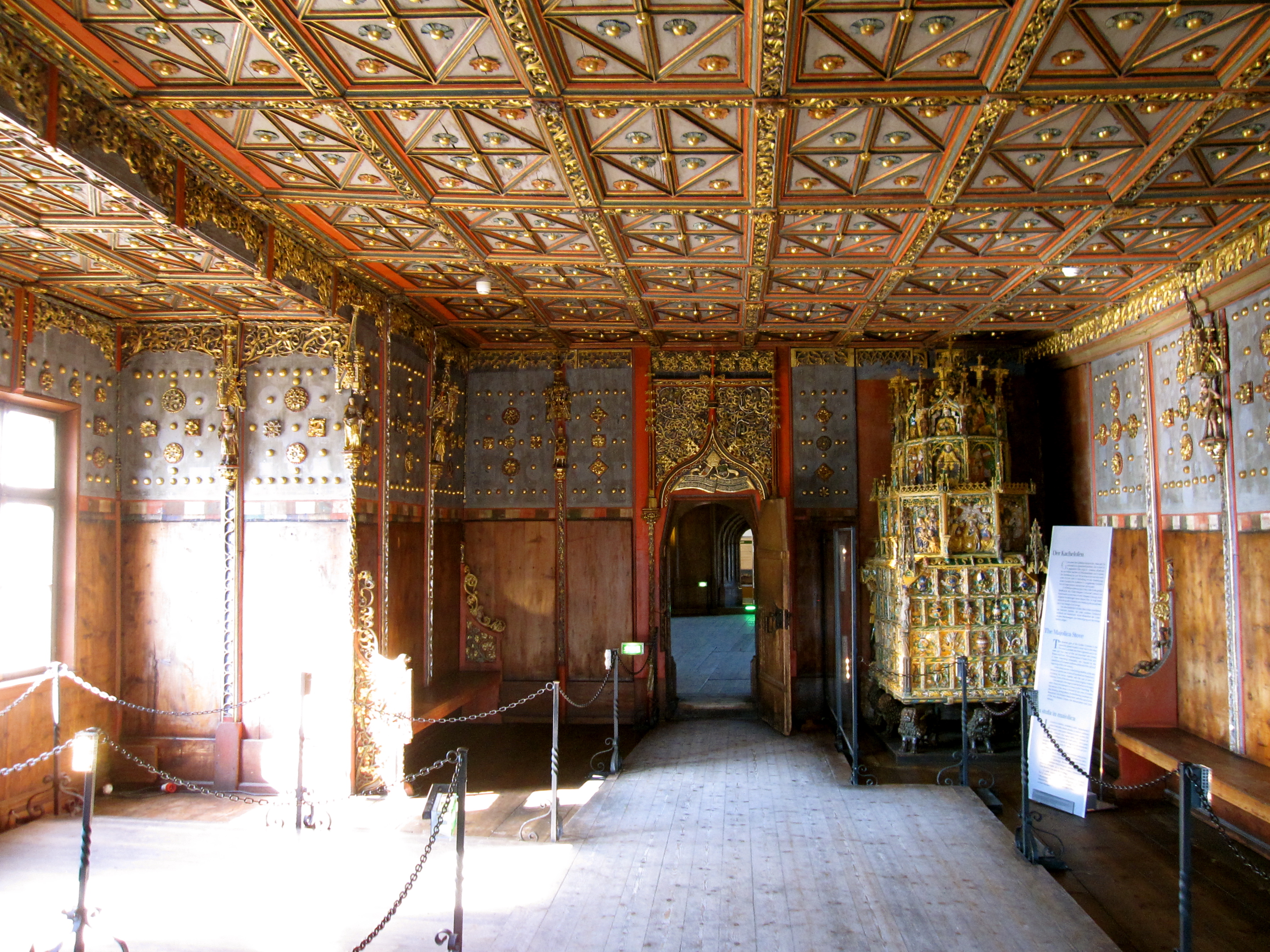
Golden Chamber

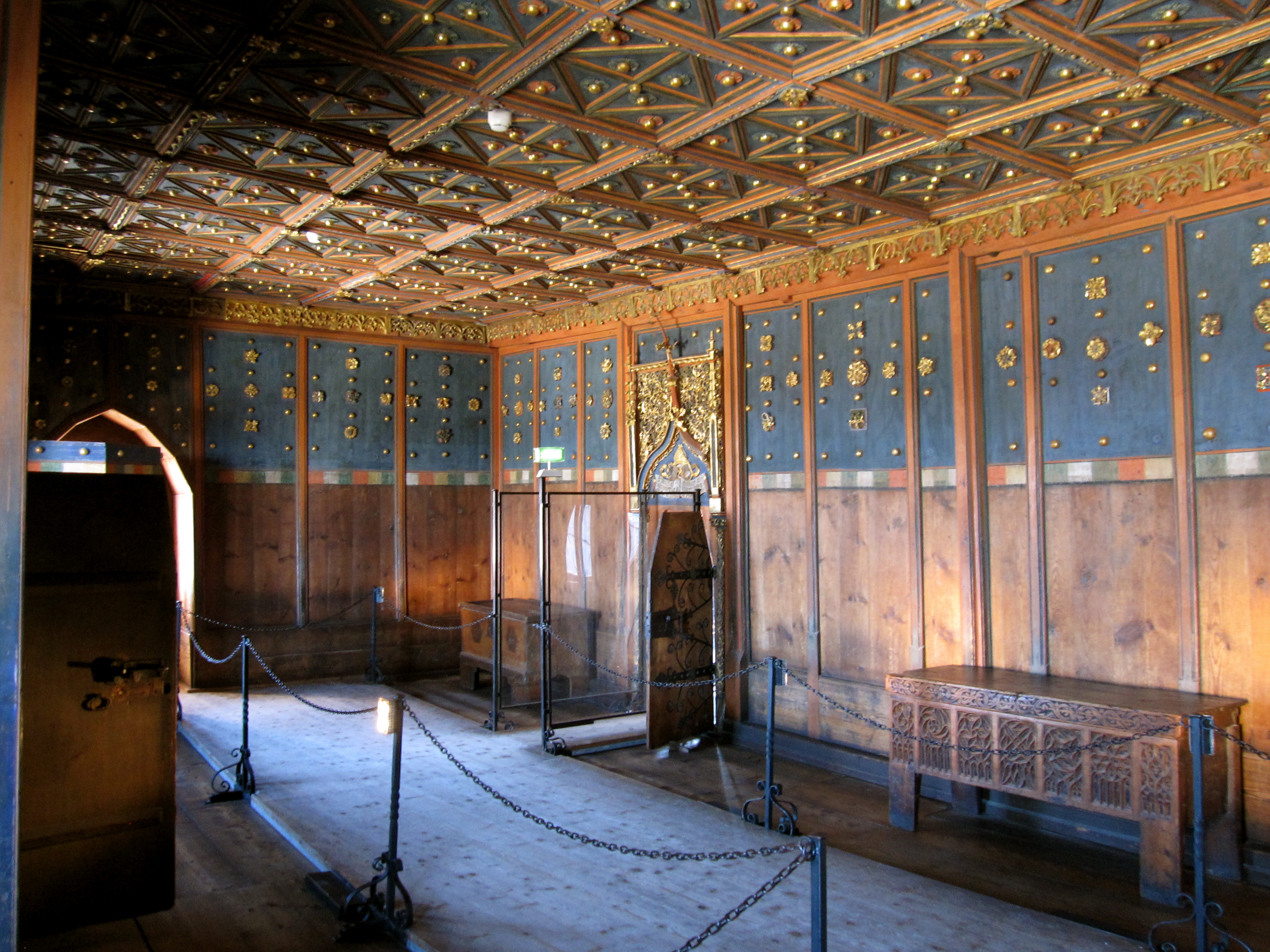
Bedchamber of the Prince-Bishop

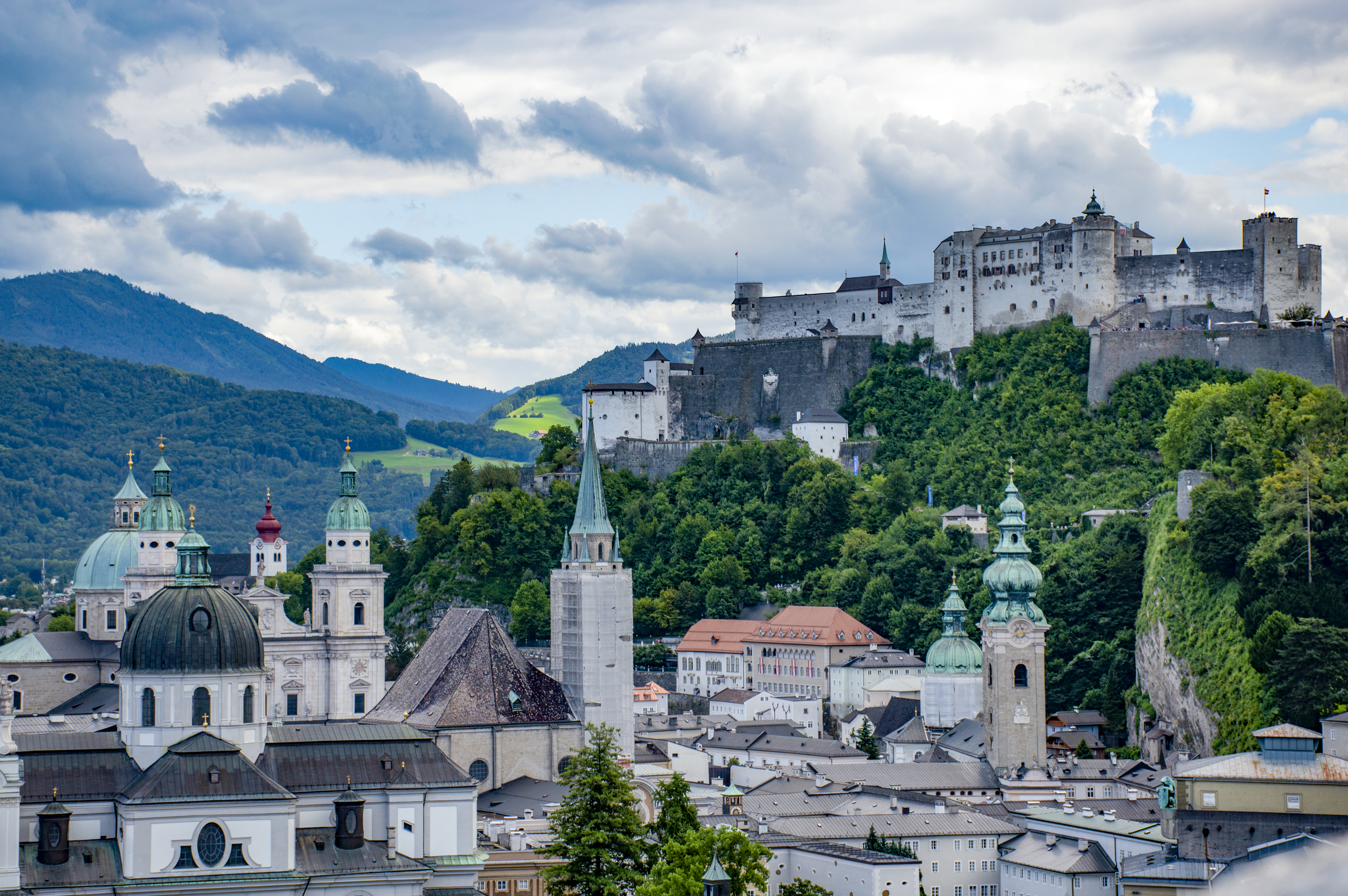
Hohensalzburg viewed from the Museum of Modern Art

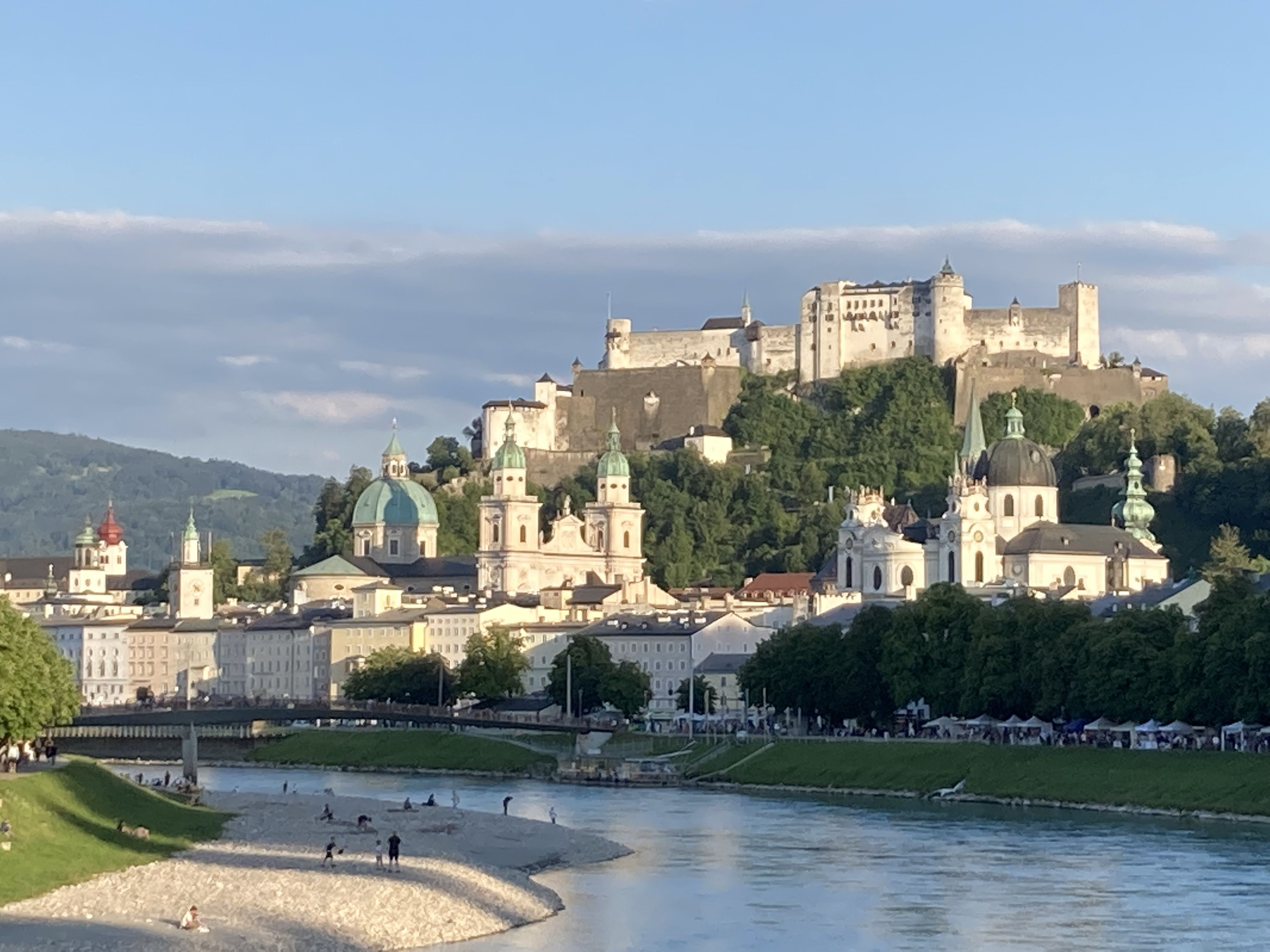
View from the Salzach

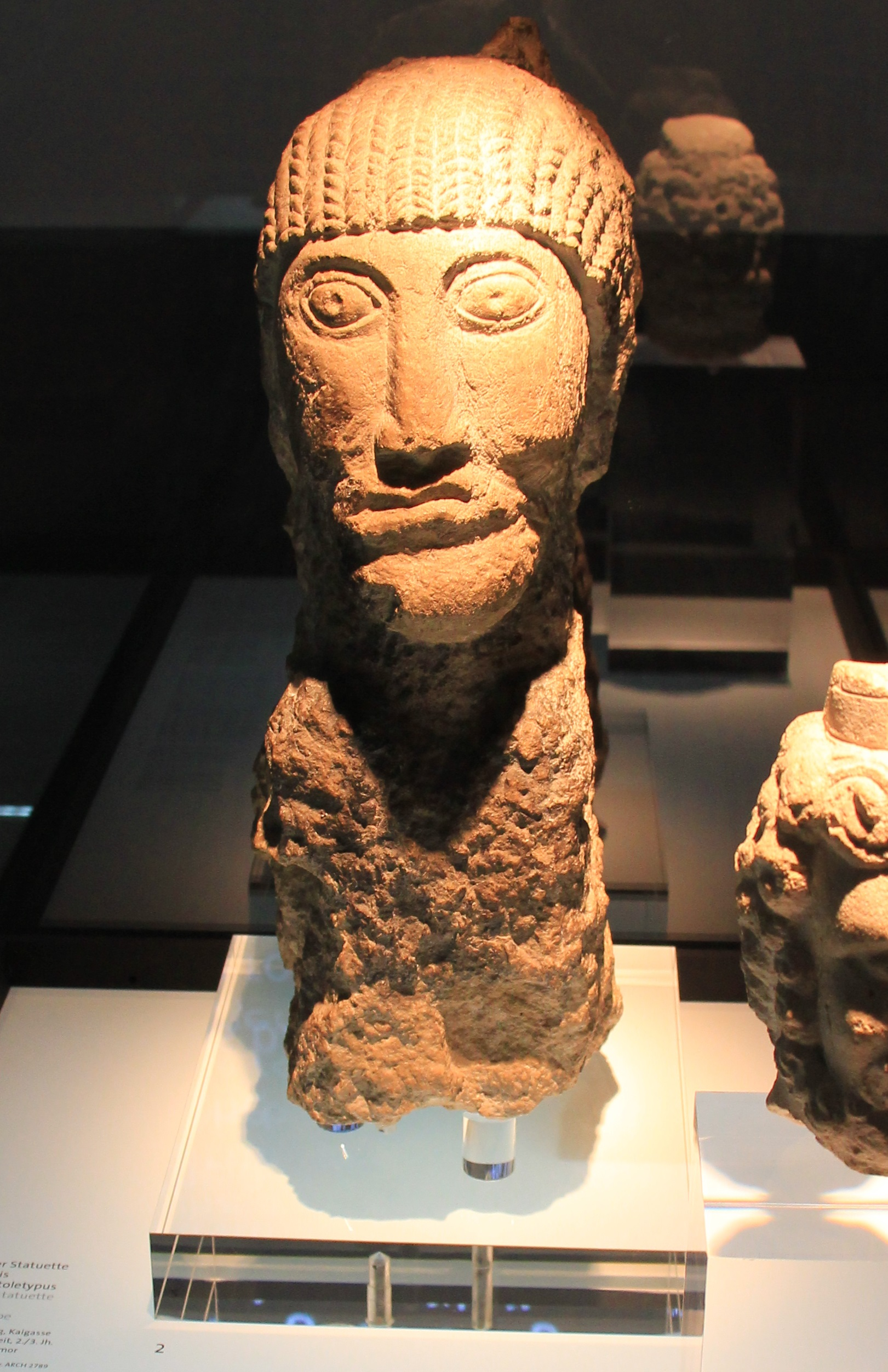
The Hohensalzburg head, a head used as spolia in the fortress until 1956.

== See also ==
- Alte Residenz
- Hohenwerfen Castle
- Salzburg Cathedral
