= Matthäus Lang von Wellenburg =

Holy Roman Empire statesman, cardinal and Prince-Archbishop of Salzburg (1469–1540)

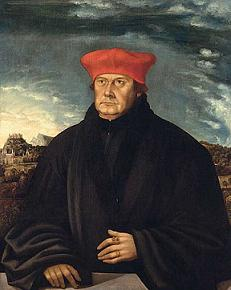
Cardinal Lang von Wellenburg, oil on parchment, Danube school, early 16th century

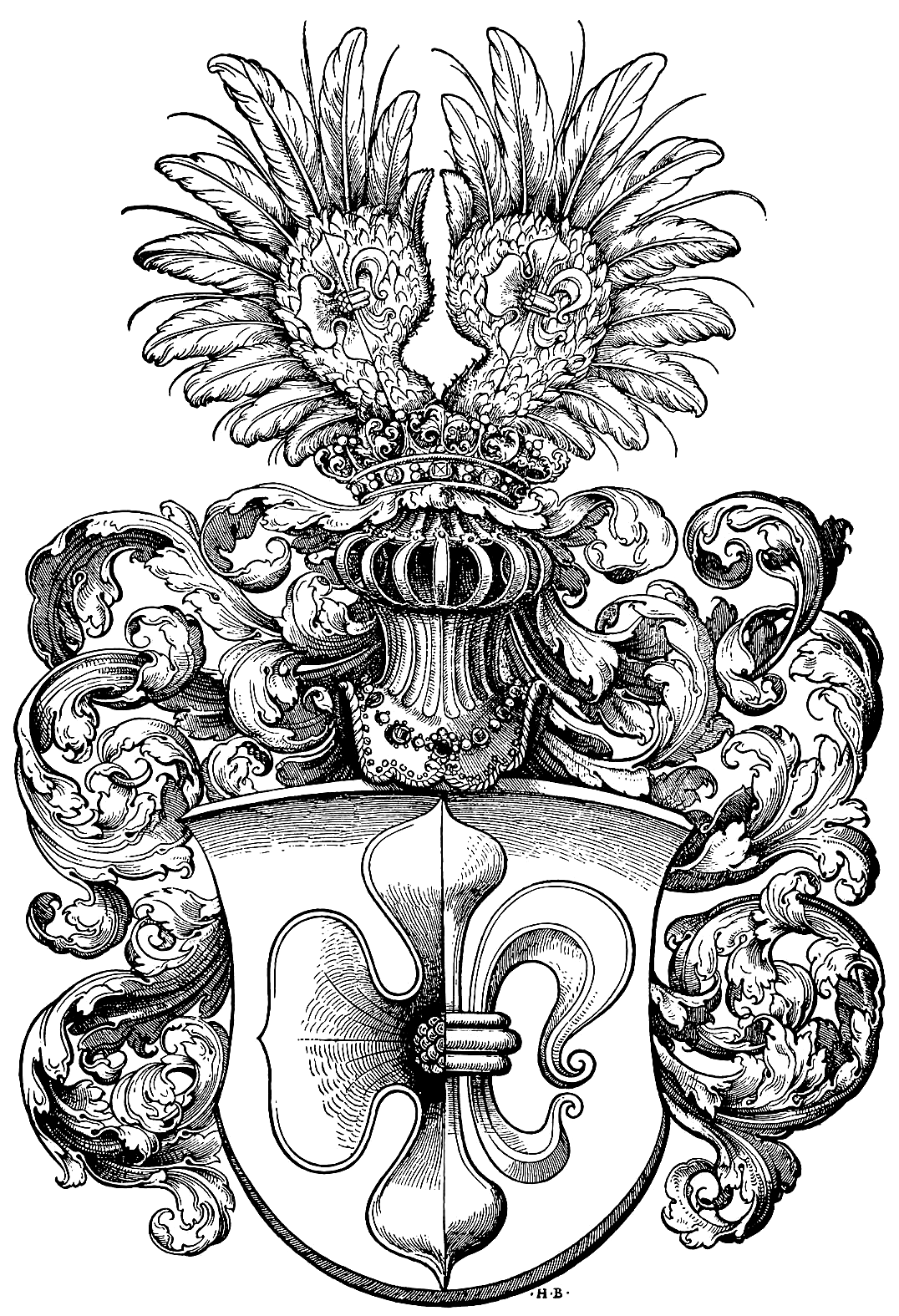
Coat of arms of Cardinal Matthäus Lang von Wellenburg

Matthäus Lang von Wellenburg (1469 – 30 March 1540) was a statesman of the Holy Roman Empire, a Cardinal and Prince-Archbishop of Salzburg from 1519 to 1540.

== Life ==
Matthäus Lang was the son of a burgher of Augsburg and later received the noble title of Wellenburg after a castle near his hometown that came into his possession in 1507. After studying at Ingolstadt, Vienna and Tübingen he entered the service of Emperor Frederick III of Habsburg and quickly made his way to the front. He was also one of the most trusted advisers of Frederick's son and successor Maximilian I, and his services were rewarded in 1500 with the provostship of the cathedral at Augsburg and five years later with the position of the Bishop of Gurk. He also received the Bishopric of Cartagena in Murcia in 1510 and was appointed cardinal by Pope Julius II one year later. In 1514 he became coadjutor to Leonhard von Keutschach, the Salzburg Prince-Archbishop, whom he succeeded in 1519. He received the title of a Cardinal Bishop of the Suburbicarian diocese of Albano in 1535.

In the course of the Protestant Reformation Lang's adherence to the older faith, together with his pride and arrogance, made him very unpopular in his Salzburg diocese. As early as in 1523 he was involved in a serious struggle with his subjects in the City of Salzburg, and in 1525, during the German Peasants' War, he had again to fight hard to hold his own. Insurgents occupied the town of Hallein, devastated the archbishop's Burg Hohenwerfen and even laid siege to his residence at Hohensalzburg, until they were finally defeated with the aid of troops provided by the Swabian League.

Cardinal Lang was one of the chief ministers of Charles V; he played an important part in the tangled international negotiations of his time; and he was always loyal to his imperial masters. Not without reason has he been compared with Cardinal Wolsey.

== Bibliography ==
- Nicole Riegel: Die Bautätigkeit des Kardinals Matthäus Lang von Wellenburg (1468–1540), Münster (Westf.) 2009. ISBN 978-3-930454-75-4
