= 1420s =

Decade

The 1420s decade ran from January 1, 1420, to December 31, 1429.

== Events ==
=== 1420 ===
==== January–March ====
- January 25 – The civil war in Switzerland, which has pitted the cantons of Lucerne, Uri and Unterwalden, supporting rebels in Valais against the Baron of Valais and against the Canton of Bern, is ended by the signing of a treaty at the neutral town of Zug, after mediation by Amadeus VIII, Duke of Savoy.
- February 8 – Admiral Pietro Loredan of the Republic of Venice is assigned to carry out the conquest of Dalmatia (later part of Croatia) across the Adriatic Sea.
- February 14 – English Lollard William Taylor is acquitted of charges of heresy in a trial before the Archbishop of Canterbury, Henry Chichele. Taylor will in 1423 be convicted of heresy and burned at the stake.
- March 1 – Pope Martin V issues the papal bull Omnium plasmatoris domini, calling upon Roman Catholics to unite in a crusade against what he considers heretic Christian sects, including the adherents of John Wycliffe (Lollards) and the followers of Jan Hus (Hussites).
- March 15 – Sigismund, the Holy Roman Emperor, orders the execution of the Hussite Jan Krása, who had led an uprising against the Empire at Wroclaw.
- March 17 – Ferdinand de Palacios, an envoy of the Pope, publishes the papal bull at Wroclaw, calling for a crusade against the Hussites.
- March 25 – Hussite Wars After their offer of a surrender is refused, the outnumbered Hussites of Bohemia, led by Jan Zizka, defeat the invading Holy Roman Imperial forces at the Battle of Sudoměř fought near modern-day Čejetice in the Czech Republic.
- March 26 – Frederick I, Elector of Brandenburg leads a decisive defeat of the Pomeranian Alliance in the battle of Angermünde.

==== April–June ====
- April 22 – A dispute between the County of Nassau-Siegen and the Electorate of Trier over who shall be made count of Isenburg-Limburg is settled after negotiations.
- April 30 – Great Frisian War: In a war that began 70 years earlier in 1350 The Skieringers, led by Sikke Sjaarda, capture the city of Bolsward (part of Friesland in the modern Netherlands) from the wealthier Fetkeapers. The allies of the Fetkeapers, led by Focko Ukena, then react and make a counterattack on May 12 at Palesloot near Hindeloopen.
- May 12 – Naval and military forces of the Republic of Venice, led by Admiral Loredan, begin their assault on the territory of Dalamatia in order to control the Adriatic. By October, the area is under Venetian control.
- May 21 – Treaty of Troyes: With the Burgundian faction dominant in France, King Charles VI of France acknowledges Henry V of England as his heir, and as virtual ruler of most of France.
- May 23 – Albert V, Duke of Austria, issues the Vienna Gesera, a campaign of expulsion or extermination of the 1,500 Jewish residents of Vienna. Those who are not imprisoned are executed 10 months later, and similar persecutions are carried out in other cities in Austria.
- May 25 – Henry the Navigator is appointed Grand Master of the Military Order of Christ.
- June 2 – Catherine of Valois (daughter of Charles VI of France) is married to King Henry V of England.
- June 7 – Troops of the Republic of Venice capture Udine after a long siege, ending the independence of the Patriarchal State of Friuli, run by the Patriarch of Aquileia.

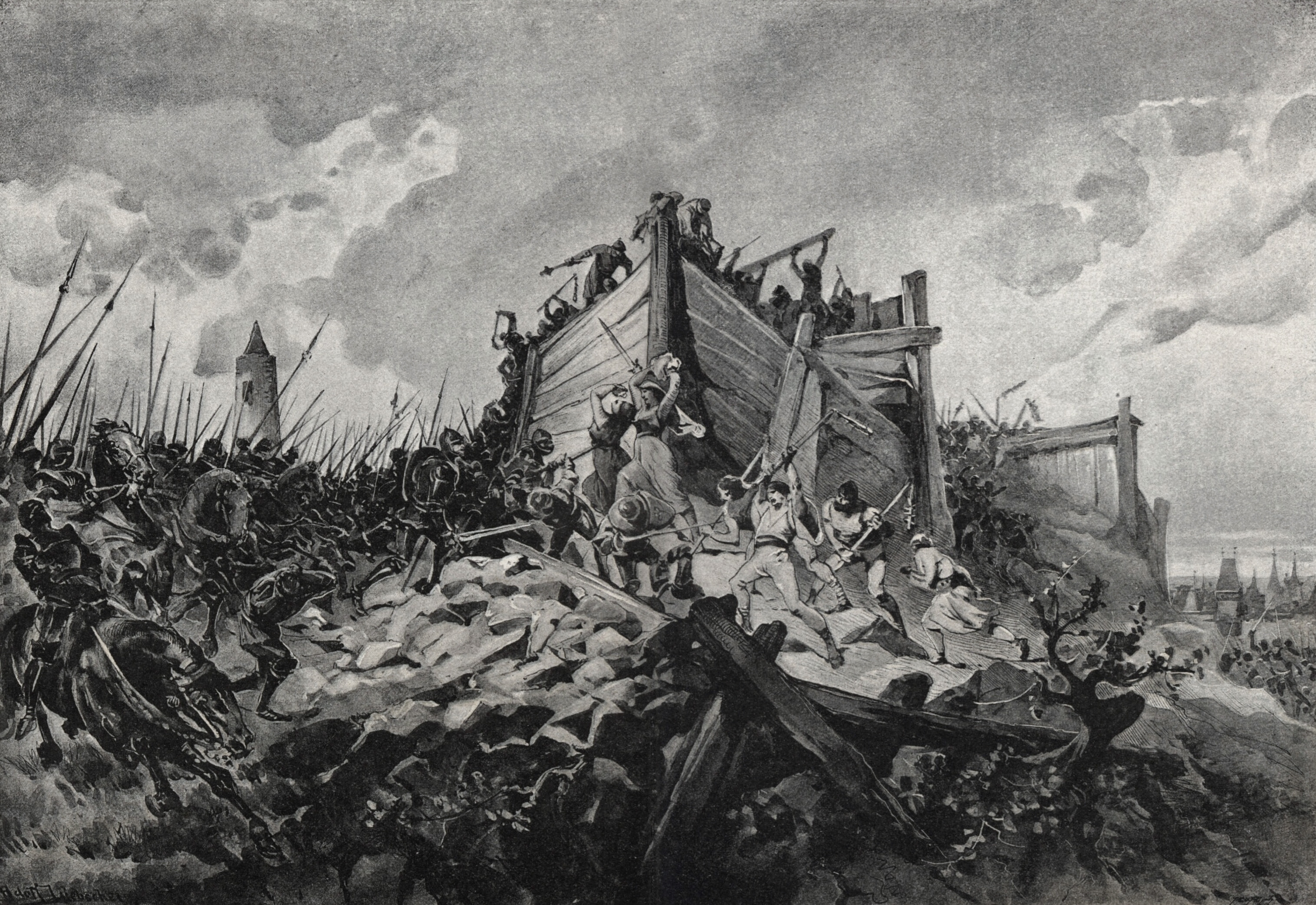
Vitkov Hill

- June 12–July 14 – The Hussites of Jan Zizka defeat the combined forces of the Holy Roman Empire, the Kingdom of Germany, the Duchy of Austria and the Kingdom of Hungary at the Battle of Vítkov Hill on the outskirts of Prague.

==== July–September ====
- August 7 – Construction of the dome of Florence Cathedral is started, after Filippo Brunelleschi wins the commission for his "double shell" design.
- August 31 – A 9.4 M_{S}-strong earthquake shakes Chile's Atacama Region, causing tsunamis in Chile, as well as Hawaii and Japan.
- August – Radu II of Wallachia, supported by the Ottomans, and Dan II, with Hungarian help, start a seven-years-long struggle for the throne of Wallachia, after Michael I is killed in a battle. The throne of Wallachia will switch from one to another about four times until 1427, when Radu II dies.
- September 3 – Murdoch Stewart becomes the new Duke of Albany and Regent of Scotland for King James I, upon the death of his father Robert Stewart. During his time governing Scotland, Murdoch makes no effort to secure King James's release from captivity in England until forced to do so by political pressure.
- September 15 – In a crusade against the Hussites, Holy Roman Imperial forces begin the siege of Vyšehrad
- September 24 – The Ottoman Army defeats a rebellion, led by Miklós Csáki, Voivode of Transylvania (modern Romania). Two days later, the Ottoman troops loot and burn the city of Orăștie and take thousands of Transylvanian civilians as slaves.

==== October–December ====
- October 21 – King Henry V summons the English Parliament, directing its members to assemble at Westminster on December 2.
- October 22 – Ghiyāth al-dīn Naqqāsh, an envoy of the embassy sent by the Timurid ruler of Persia, Shah Rukh (r. 1404–1447), to the Ming dynasty of China during the reign of the Yongle Emperor (r. 1402–1424), records his sight and travel over a large floating pontoon bridge at Lanzhou (constructed in 1372) as he crosses the Yellow River on this day. He writes that it was: "...composed of twenty three boats, of great excellence and strength attached together by a long chain of iron as thick as a man's thigh, and this was moored on each side to an iron post as thick as a man's waist extending a distance of ten cubits on the land and planted firmly in the ground, the boats being fastened to this chain by means of big hooks. There were placed big wooden planks over the boats so firmly and evenly that all the animals were made to pass over it without difficulty."
- October 28 – Beijing ("Northern Capital") is officially designated the capital of Ming dynasty China by the Yongle Emperor, replacing Nanjing, during the same year that the Forbidden City, the seat of government, is completed and construction begins on the Temple of Heaven in the new capital city.
- November 1 – Hussite Wars: Battle of Vyšehrad – Sigismund, Holy Roman Emperor, fails and is ejected from Bohemia.
- November 17 – Hundred Years' War: Melun surrenders to the English.
- December 2 – The 9th Parliament of King Henry V of England is opened at Westminster, and selects Roger Hunt as Speaker of the House of Commons.

==== Date unknown ====
- Tang Saier starts a rebellion against the emperor of China, and takes two cities with her rebel army, before she is defeated.
- Alexander the Good defends Moldavia against the first incursion by the Ottomans, at the Cetatea Albă fortress.
- Henry V of England's flagship Grace Dieu is commissioned and makes her only voyage.

=== 1421 ===
==== January–March ====
- January 13 – Al-Muzaffar Ahmad becomes the Mamluk sultan of Egypt and Syria upon the death of his father, Al-Mu'ayyad Shaykh
- January 19 – The coronation of John VIII Palaiologos as the Emperor of Byzantium, the "Eastern Roman Empire", takes place in Constantinople.
- February 2 – China's Cheng Zu, third emperor of the Ming dynasty, shifts the Ming capital from Nanjing to Beijing.
- February 23 – The coronation of Catherine of Valois as Queen consort of England takes place at Westminster Abbey.
- March 3 – Zheng He receives an imperial order from China's Emperor Cheng Zu to begin the Ming treasure voyages, carrying imperial letters, silk products and other gifts to various rulers of countries around the Indian Ocean.
- March 12 – In his campaign to rid Germany of Jewish people, Albert V, Duke of Austria issues a death sentence against wealthy Jews who had been imprisoned as part of his order of May 23, 1420. On March 12, the burning at the stake of 120 women and 92 women is carried out south of the city walls of Vienna.
- March 17 – 12 Rabi al-Awwal 824 AH: Ibrahim ibn Hasan ibn Ajlan and his brother Barakat ibn Hasan are confirmed by the Mamluk Egyptian Sultan Al-Muzaffar Ahmad as co-Emirs of Mecca.
- March 21 – Battle of Baugé: A small French force, led by Gilbert Motier de La Fayette, surprises and defeats a smaller English force under Thomas, Duke of Clarence, a brother of King Henry V of England, in Normandy. Thomas, heir to the throne and Crown Prince as is killed in the attack, along with about 1,000 other of men.

==== April–June ====
- April 8 – Maredudd ab Owain Glyndŵr, son of the Welsh rebel Owain Glyndŵr, accepts a pardon from, and swears loyalty to England's King Henry V, formally bringing an end to the Glyndŵr rebellion.
- April 12 – Hedwig Jagiellon, the 13-year-old daughter of and heiress presumptive to Wladyslaw II, King of Poland, is betrothed in a marriage contract to Prince Frederick, the 7-year-old son of Frederick I, Elector of Brandenburg as part of an alliance between Poland and Brandenburg during the Brandenburg–Pomeranian conflict. The marriage is scheduled to take place after November 19, 1427, when Prince Frederick is to be 14 years old, at which time he will live in Poland and become eligible to serve with Hedwig as ruler of Poland and Lithuania. The marriage will never take place, and the contract is annulled in 1424 when a male heir to the Polish throne, Wladyslaw, is born.
- April 24 – The Sedlec Abbey, a monastery for the Cistercians order in Bohemia, is looted and burned by Hussites led by Jan Žižka, and several of the monks inside are killed.
- May 26 – Mehmed I, Sultan of the Ottoman Empire, dies and is succeeded by his son, Murad II.
- June 10 – One year after returning home for his marriage to Catherine of Valois, and in the English defeat in the Battle of Baugé, King Henry V of England sails back to France with new troops to continue fighting in the Hundred Years War.
- June 25 – Prince Charles of Valois, the oldest son of King Charles VI and former Dauphin before being disinehrited by his father, captures the English fortress at Gallardon and has the entire garrison executed for treason, and then retakes Chartres.

==== July–September ====
- July 2 – At Erciş in what is now Turkey, Iskandar ibn Yusuf is crowned as the Sultan of Qara Qoyunlu, a kingdom encompassing what are now eastern Turkey, northwestern Iran and northern Iraq, northern Armenia and all of Azerbaijan.
- July 15 – A ceasefire is declared in the Great Frisian War as the representatives warring parties agree to a treaty at the city of Greetsiel in what is now the German region of Ostfriesland. A boundary is set at the Lauwers River in the Netherlands with the territory to the west (Friesland) going to the Frisian rebel group, the Skieringers. The lands to the east Groningen go the Fetkeapers.
- August 5 – At the Battle of Brüx, Hussite troops led by Jan Želivský, are defeated by the German Saxon baron Frederick of Meissen at what is now the city of Most in what is now the Czech Republic.
- August 29 – Sayf al-Din Tatar, becomes the new Mamluk Sultan of Egypt and Syria after leading a coup d'etat overthrowing and imprisoning his brother, Al-Muzaffar Ahmad.
- September 12– In what is now South Korea, Taejong of Goryeo, King of Joseon from 1400 to 1418, then King Emeritus since 1418, is crowned as the first Grand King Emeritus of Joseon.
- September 28– A treaty is signed at Vienna between Sigismund, King of Hungary, Croatia, Bohemia and Germany and Albert V, Duke of Austria for Sigismund's daughter Elizabeth of Luxembourg, to marry Albert (on April 19, 1422) and confirming Elizabeth's rights as heiress presumptive to the thrones of Hungary and Bohemia.

==== October–December ====
- October 20–King Henry V summons the English Parliament for the last time in his life, directing the members to assemble at Westminster on December 1.
- November 17–19 – St. Elizabeth's flood: The coastal area near Dordrecht in the Netherlands is flooded, due to the extremely high tide of the North Sea; 72 villages are drowned, killing about 10,000 people, and the course of the Meuse is changed.
- November 30 – Al-Nasir al-Din Muhammad beomes the fourth Mamluk Sultan of Egypt and Syria in less than a year when his father Sayf al-Din Tatar, dies after only three months on the throne.
- December 1 – The 11th and last Parliament of King Henry V assembles at Westminster and elects Richard Baynard as Speaker of the House of Commons.
- December 21 – Hussite Wars: At the Battle of Kutná Hora, the Bohemian Hussites led by Jan Zizka, and using the best weapons available, force the exit of the crusaders of the Holy Roman Empire. Among the new wespons developed by Zizka's officers are the "war wagon", a vehicle with reinforced sides and small openings from which guns can be fired.
- December 26 – In India, Ahmad Shah I, the Sultan of Gujarat and his troops, camped at Sarangpur, resist a surprise counter-attack by the army of the Malwa Sultanate, led by the Sultan Hoshang Shah.

==== Date unknown ====
- John III of Dampierre, Marquis of Namur, sells his estates to Philip the Good, Duke of Burgundy.
- The first patent is issued by the Republic of Florence.
- Portuguese sailors sent by Henry the Navigator cross Cape Non, going as far as Cape Bojador.
- Traditional date – Larabanga Mosque is founded, in modern-day northern Ghana.

=== 1422 ===
==== January–March ====
- January 10 – Hussite Wars – Battle of Německý Brod: The Hussites defeat an army of Royalist Crusaders.
- January 15 – Charlotte of Bourbon, Queen of Cyprus, consort and wife of King Janus since 1411, dies after contracting pneumonic plague as an epidemic spreads across the island kingdom.
- January 18 – Friso-Hollandic Wars: The Hollandic fortress of Lemmer is captured by the Frisian Skieringer rebels. Lemmer's commander, Floris of Alkemade, is taken prisoner and executed. The result prompts both sides to enter into a settlement.
- February 1 – The Peace of Groningen is signed in the Dutch city of the same name with 94 chieftains of rebels and Allies agreeing to preserve the Frisian right to self-government as well as barring foreign lords from Frisian land and bringing an end to the Great Frisian War after nine years.
- March 9 – In Prague, the Hussite priest Jan Želivský is arrested when he appears at the city hall. Already known for overseeing the killing of Catholic civilians and the pillaging of Catholic towns outside of Prague, is blamed for the Czech Bohemian loss at the August 5 Battle of Brüx. He is sentenced to death and beheaded on the same day.
- March 11 – On Okinawa Island, now part of Japan, King Shō Hashi of Chūzan begins a war against the two other kingdoms on the island, Hokuzan and Nanzan and begins the unification of Okinawa.
- March 21 – Hundred Years' War – The Siege of Meaux ends in France after more than five months as the starving citizens of the walled city of Meaux open the city gates and surrender to the English forces led by King Henry V. The city had been under siege since October 6. The city's defending troops flee across a bridge to their last line of defense, the fortress known as Le Marché.

==== April–June ====
- April 1 – Al-Ashraf Sayf ad-Dīn Barsbāy leads a coup d'etat against the Egyptian Sultan Al-Nasir al-Din Muhammad and begins a 16-year reign as the new Sultan.
- May 10 – The last French defenders of the siege of Meaux surrender their fortress at Le Marche when the starving members of the garrison threaten to rebel.
- June 10–September – The Ottoman sultan Murad II besieges Constantinople; the siege is broken off as a result of the rebellion of Küçük Mustafa.

==== July–September ====
- July 11 – In Italy, a group of about 100 Romani people, described as "Gypsies" arrive in Bologna with a stated intention of traveling to Rome to meet the Pope. Their leader, calling himself "Duke Andrea", shows to local officials a decree allegedly signed by the King of Hungary that is said to grant them the right to commit robberies "without penalty or penance" wherever they travel, as a reward for 4,000 gypsies being re-baptized into the Christian faith.
- August 22 – Use of the Spanish era dating system (which begins counting from 38 BC rather than from 1 AD, and thus refers to the year 1422 as "1460") ends as the Kingdom of Portugal, last on the Iberian peninsula to continue the style of dating, goes to Anno Domini dates.
- September 1 – Henry VI becomes King of England, at the age of nine months, upon the death of his father, King Henry V.
- September 27 – The Teutonic Knights sign the Treaty of Melno with the Kingdom of Poland and Grand Duchy of Lithuania, after the brief Gollub War. The Prussian–Lithuanian border established by the treaty remains unchanged, until World War I.
- September 29 – The Duke of Bedford Regent for King Henry VI of England, summons the members of Parliament to assemble at Westminster on November 9.

==== October–December ====
- October 21 – King Charles VI of France passes away at the age of 53 after years of mental illness, and rival groups fight over who his successor will be. In Paris, Henry VI of England, the 10-month old son of the late French regent, England's King Henry V, and grandson of King Charles VI, is proclaimed King Henri II of France. In Bourges, the Dauphin Charles, eldest son of King Charles VI, is proclaimed as King Charles VII.
- November 7 – After being returned to England from France, and then being taken on a two-day journey from Southwark to Temple Bar and thence to London, the body of the late King Henry V is buried at Westminster Abbey.
- November 9 – At the opening of the English Parliament, the House of Commons elects Roger Flower as its speaker.
- December 9 – The Regency Council of the infant King Henry VI of England assembles for the first time with 18 nobles, led by John of Lancaster, Duke of Bedford, the uncle of the King and the brother of the late King Henry V. Because the Duke of Bedford serves primarily in France to command English forces there in the ongoing war, another uncle, Humphrey, Duke of Gloucester, leads the regency most of the time during the King's minority.
- December 18
  - King Charles VII of France marries Marie of Anjou in a ceremony at Bourges.
  - As the English Parliament closes, the regents for King Henry VI give royal assent to new legislation that has been passed during the 39-day session, including the Irishmen Act setting requirements for "What sort of Irishmen only may come to dwell in England"; the Purveyance Act 1422 ("All the statutes of purveyors shall be proclaimed in every county four times in the year") relating to the royal household's purchase of provisions at a regulated price and the requisitioning of horses and vehicles for royal use; and for "A certain allowance made to those which were retained to serve King Henry V. in his wars")

==== Undated ====
- Ottoman forces overrun the last domains of Constantine II of Bulgaria, who dies in exile at the Serbian court, ending the Bulgarian Empire.
- On the Italian Peninsula, Venice has a population of 84,000, of which 200 men rule the city, while Florence has a population of 40,000, of which 600 men rule the city.

=== 1423 ===
==== January–March ====
- January 6 – The Electorate of Saxony merges with the Margravate of Meissen and the Duchy of Saxe-Wittenberg.
- February 11 – Hundred Years War: The island of Tombelaine, off of the coast of France, is taken by English forces in order to be used as a base to attack Mont Saint-Michel.
- March 7 – After failing to defeat Hushang Shah in a siege of Salangpur, the Gujarat Sultan Ahmad Shah I is attacked by Hushang's army while on his way back to Ahmedabad. He wins the battle and resumes his trip home.

==== April–June ====
- April 13 – Hundred Years' War: The Treaty of Amiens is signed as a mutual defense treaty between the Duchy of Burgundy, the Duchy of Brittany and the Kingdom of England.
- April 15 – Francesco Foscari is elected the new Doge of the Republic of Venice after the death of Tommaso Mocenigo. He will serve as the Venetian Republic's executive for 34 years before being forced to abdicate a few days before his death in 1457.
- April 27 – Hussite Wars – Battle of Hořice: The Taborites decisively beat the Utraquists.
- April 28 – Ashikaga Yoshimochi abdicates as shogun of Japan and is succeeded by his son, Ashikaga Yoshikazu.
- May 18 – The Treaty of Melno signed on September 27 to end the Gollub War between the State of the Teutonic Order (on the Baltic Sea, with a capital at Marienburg) and the alliance of Poland and Lithuania, is ratified by all three parties.
- May 22 – Byzantine–Ottoman Wars: After a two-day battle, Turakhan Beg, Ottoman governor of Thessaly, breaks through the Hexamilion wall, and ravages the Peloponnese Peninsula in Greece.
- May 23 – The Sultan of Gujarat, Ahmad Shah I is finally able to return home to reassume the throne.
- June 10 – Gil Sánchez Muñoz y Carbón, a Spanish Roman Catholic bishop, is elected by bishops in Avignon as the third "antipope", succeeding the late Antipope Benedict XIII, who had died on May 23 after a reign of more than 20 years. Sánchez Muñoz takes the name of Antipope Clement VIII as the Avignon clergy disagree with Pope Martin V of Rome.

==== July–September ====
- July 10 – Pope Martin V gives his approval of the Treaty of Melno.
- July 31 – Hundred Years' War – Battle of Cravant: The French army is defeated at Cravant, on the banks of the River Yonne near Auxerre, by the English and their Burgundian allies.
- August 2 – Ataullah Muhammad Shah I begins a 50-year reign as the Sultan of Kedah in what is now Malaysia, following the death of his father, Sulaiman Shah I, who had reigned for 50 years after becoming Sultan in 1373.
- August 12 – The Treaty of Sveti Srdj ends the Second Scutari War, waged between the Serbian Despotate and the Venetian Republic, over Scutari, and other former possessions of Zeta, captured by the Venetians.
- August – China's Emperor Cheng Zu launches his fourth campaign against the Northern Yuan.
- September 14 – The first occupation force from the Republic of Venice arrives at the Greek city of Thessalonia, recently purchased from the Ottoman Empire with six galleys entering the harbor.
- September 26 – Hundred Years' War: The Battle of La Brossinière is fought in France near Bourgon in what is now the Mayenne département. The English force of 2,800 men, under the command of Sir John De la Pole, is crushed by the armies of France, Anjou and Maine, and the English suffer more than 1,400 deaths.
- September 28 – The English nobility swear their loyalty to King Henry VI.

==== October–December ====
- October 20 – The Second Parliament of King Henry VI of England assembles after having been summoned on September 1. The House of Commons, led by John Russell, will consider laws until its adjournment on February 28.
- November 16 – On behalf of the infant King Henry VI of England, Duke of Bedford, Regent for France, confirms the 1315 Norman Charter.
- November 17 – Three weeks before his second birthday, King Henry VI of England is brought before the assembled members of the House of Lords and the House of Commons for the first time.
- December 15 – After a two-year expedition to Byzantium, Giovanni Aurispa arrives in Venice with largest and finest collection of Greek language texts up to that time, including 238 ancient manuscripts.
- December 24 – Hussite Wars: In what is now the Czech Republic, General Sigismund Korybut, commander of the Hussite Army, withdraws his troops from Prague on the orders of Vytautas, Grand Duke of Lithuania and Władysław II Jagiełło, King of Poland.

==== Date unknown ====
- The three independent boroughs of Pamplona are united into a single town by royal decree, after centuries of feuds.
- Dan II of Wallachia, with Hungarian help, wins two battles against the Ottomans.

=== 1424 ===
==== January–March ====
- January 23 – William Cheyne becomes the Lord Chief Justice of England and Wales, replacing the late William Hankford.
- February 1 – While negotiating his release from captivity, King James of Scotland is allowed to be married to Joan Beaufort in London, with a ceremony taking place at Southwark Cathedral.
- February 12 – The coronation of Sophia of Halshany, wife of Władysław II Jagiełło, as Queen consort of Poland takes place at the Kraków Cathedral.
- February 14 – Wars in Lombardy: The army of the Florentine Republic, led by Captain Pandolfo III Malatesta, storms the city of Romagna.
- March 28 – King James I of Scotland is released after having been held captive in England for 18 years. James is freed after putting his royal seal on a ransom treaty of £40,000, secured by Scottish hostages taking his place, as agreed at Durham, England.

==== April–June ====
- April 5 – King James returns to Scotland for the first time since 1406, after being escorted to the border along with his wife Joan Beaufort, Queen consort, by English and Scottish nobles.
- May 21 – The coronation of James I as King of Scotland takes place at Scone Abbey in the Scottish town of Scone. After the ceremony King James performs his first knighthood ceremony, honoring 18 prominent nobles.
- June 2 – Battle of L'Aquila: Jacopo Caldora and Micheletto Attendolo, for the Kingdom of Naples, defeat Braccio da Montone, for Alfonso V of Aragon.

==== July –September ====
- July 28 – The army of the Duchy of Milan, led by the Duke Filippo Maria Visconti, defeats the Republic of Florence's army, led by Carlo I Malatesta, in the Battle of Zagonara.
- August 17 – Battle of Verneuil: An English force under John, Duke of Bedford, defeats a larger French army under the Duke of Alençon, John Stewart, and Archibald, Earl of Douglas. Alençon is captured and Douglas killed.
- September 7 – Prince Zhu Gaochi of China becomes the Hongxi Emperor (Emperor Renzong) of the Ming dynasty, beginning the Hongxi era, after the August 12 death of his father, the Yongle Emperor.
- September 13 – After the signing of a treaty between the different factions in the Hussite Wars, the Bohemian campaign is completed in the modern-day Czech Republic.
- September 23 – The Hussites, led by Jan Žižka, begin marching towards North Moravia to suppress the ongoing rebellion there.

==== October –December ====
- October 11 – Prokop the Great takes command of the Hussites after the death of Jan Žižka from the plague.
- November 1 – Zhu Zhanji is designated as the Crown Prince of Ming dynasty China by his father, the Hongxi Emperor. The Emperor dies eight months later and Zhu Zhanji becomes the Xuande Emperor on June 27, 1425.
- November – The Bourges astronomical clock, designed by Jean Fusoris, is installed in Bourges Cathedral as a gift to the town from Charles VII of France.
- December 10 – Radu II Chelul becomes the Prince of Wallachia (now in Romania) for the third time, taking over from Dan II after an Ottoman invasion.

==== Date unknown ====
- Dalmatia: Aliota Capenna, lord of Lesina (modern-day Hvar), offers his realm to the Republic of Venice (also said to have occurred in 1409 and 1421).

=== 1425 ===
==== January – March ====
- January 8 – The interment of Ming dynasty China's Yongle Emperor, who died on August 12, takes place at the Chang Mausoleum in Beijing's Ming tombs.
- January 13 – The Venetian Republic's Great Council authorizes spending to equip 25 galleys for use as warships.
- January 19 – The Yongle Era ends in China and the Hongxi era begins.
- February 12 – Discrimination against the Caquins of Brittany is increased as the Duke of Brittany, Jean V, forbids the Caquins from engaging in trade.
- February 24 – King Henry VI of England summons the English Parliament, ordering the members to assemble on April 30 at Westminster.
- February 27 – 11 days shy of his tenth birthday, Vasily II becomes the new Grand Prince of Moscow upon the death of his father, Vasily I of Moscow. Vasily II's mother, Sophia of Lithuania, serves as his regent.
- March 12 – King James I of Scotland opens a brief session of the Scottish Parliament, which opens at Perth and ends after only five days.

==== April –June ====
- April 30 – The Third English Parliament of King Henry VI opens at Westminster for a session of almost three months. Thomas Walton is elected as Speaker of the House of Commons.
- May 29 – China's Emperor Renzong dies after a reign of only nine months. He is succeeded by his son, Prince Zhu Zhanji, who becomes the Xuande Emperor.
- June 27 – Zhu Zhanji is formally enthroned as the Ming dynasty Emperor of China as the Emperor Xuanzong, beginning the Xuande Era.

==== July –September ====
- July 14 – The English Parliament closes as King Henry VI gives royal assent to the Labourers Act 1425, the River Lee Navigation Act 1425 and laws requiring a royal license for exportation of sheep and for exportation of butter and cheese.
- July 21 – John VIII Palaiologos becomes the Emperor of Byzantium upon the death of the Emperor Manuel II Palaiologos.
- July 21 – The Great Council of Venice agrees to accept many of the demands by the residents of occupied Thessalonia and requests Venetian administrators to respect the customs and rights of the citizens and to work together with the Thessalonian local council of 12 nobles in the governance of the city.
- August 1 – In Germany, Frederick of Wettin is enfoeffed by Sigismund, King of the Germans at Ofen as the new Elector of Saxony
- August – (Tawthalin 787 ME); King Thihathu of Ava, the Burmese monarch in what is now Myanmar, is ambushed at Amarapura after being guided into a trap by one of his wives, Queen Shin Bo-Me. His 8-year-old nephew, Min Hla, becomes the new King while Shin Bo-Me seeks a way to take the throne for herself.
- September 8 – In Spain, King Carlos III of Navarre dies after a reign of 38 years. His daughter, Princess Bianca, becomes the Queen of Navarre and her husband, King John II of Aragon becomes her co-ruler.

==== October –December ====
- October 7 – King Charles VII of France and John V, the English Duke of Brittany, sign the Treaty of Saumur to settle the war between the kingdom and the duchy.
- October 17 – (4 Dhu al-Hijjah 828 AH) Hasan ibn Ajlan becomes the Emir of Mecca for the third and last time, after having been replaced for 18 months by Ali ibn Inan.
- November 9 – Kale Kye-Taung Nyo becomes King of Ava by having his lover, Queen Shin Bo-Me, assassinate his 8-year-old nephew, King Min Hla.
- December 9 – The Old University of Leuven, Belgium is founded.

==== Date unknown ====
- The Maltese people rise up against Don Gonsalvo Monroy, count of Malta. The insurgents repel an attempt by the Viceroy of Sicily to bring the island to order. The Maltese do not submit to Catalan-Aragonese rule, until the Magna Charta Libertatis, granting them their new rights, is delivered to them.
- Beijing, capital of China, becomes the largest city in the world, taking the lead from Nanjing (estimated date).
- By this year, paper currency in China is worth only 0.025% to 0.014% of its original value in the 14th century; this, and the counterfeiting of copper coin currency, will lead to a dramatic shift to using silver as the common medium of exchange in China.
- Sharafuddin Ali Yazdi's critical history of Persia, Zafar Nama, is completed under the auspices of Mirza Ibrahim Sultan, grandson of Timur.

=== 1426 ===
==== January–March ====
- January 7 – King Henry VI summons the Parliament of England, directing its members to meet at Leicester on February 18.
- January 13 – Hook and Cod wars: The Battle of Brouwershaven is fought in the Netherlands between the Burgundian State, led by Duke Philip the Good, and the troops led by Jacqueline, Countess of Hainaut, with the Burugundians winning.
- January 15 – England, led by Henry VI, declares war against the Duchy of Brittany and the Kingdom of France after John V, Duke of Brittany (Jean le Sage) allies with France's King Charles VI.
- February 8 – The Xuande Era begins in Ming dynasty China as the first Lunar New Year of the reign of the Emperor Xuanzong.
- February 18 – The English Parliament, nicknamed the Parliament of Bats because the members are not allowed to carry swords and arm themselves with clubs to defend themselves, is opened by King Henry VI at Leicester. The House of Commons elects Richard Vernon as its speaker.
- March 6 – Hundred Years' War: After being besieged since February 27 in Saint-James (near Avranches in Normandy), a 600-strong force of English knights led by Sir Thomas Rempston routs a 16,000-strong French and Brittanian force under Arthur de Richemont, Constable of France, in the Battle of Saint-James. This forces the Duke of Brittany (Richemont's brother) to offer a truce and on September 8 to acknowledge Henry VI of England's suzerainty over France.

==== April–June ====
- April 22 – The Second Scutari War between the Republic of Venice and the Serbian Despotate is formally ended by the signing of a treaty at the Serbian city of Vushtrri in what is now Albania.
- April 25 (17 Jumada al-Thani 829 AH) – Hasan ibn Ajlan, who has been allowed to leave Cairo after being appointed by the Egyptian Mamluk Sultan as the Emir of Mecca and paying the first installment of a fee of 30,000 dinars, dies on the way back to Mecca. The Sultan, Al-Ashraf Sayf ad-Dīn Barsbāy, summons Hasan's sons Barakat ibn Hasan and Ibrahim ibn Hasan to Cairo to complete payment of the remaining 25,000 dinars owed.
- May 16 – In Burma, Kale Kye-Taung Nyo, ruler of the Kingdom of Ava, flees his capital. He is succeeded by Mohnyin Thado, who receives Thinkhaya III of Toungoo.
- June 1 – The Parliament of Bats closes in England. Among the laws given royal assent by King Henry VI are a provision that writs and lawsuits against people who were later given knighthood "shall not abate for that cause," and another giving "licence to all the King's subjects to transport corn.
- June 16 – Hussite Wars – Battle of Aussig: The Hussites decisively beat the crusading armies of Germany in the Fourth Anti-Hussite Crusade and then annihilate the town of Aussig (now Ústí nad Labem) the next day.

==== July–September ====
- July 7 – Battle of Khirokitia: King Janus of Cyprus is defeated and captured by the Mamluks and brought to Egypt, where he is ransomed after ten months.
- August 16 (11 Shawwal 829 AH) – Barakat ibn Hasan, son of the late Hasan ibn Ajlan, is confirmed by the Egyptian Sultan Barsbay as the new Emir of Mecca, conditioned on paying the remaining 25,000 dinars owed by Hasan.
- September 17 (15 Dhu al-Qidah 829 AH) – Barakat ibn Hasan arrives in Mecca to officially assume the powers of the Emir of Mecca, after taking back over from his brother Abu al-Qasim.

==== October–December ====
- October 12 – Uckermark War (1425–1427): Representing Brandenburg, the Elector Friedrich and his son Johann "the alchemist" sign a treaty with William of Werle, ruler of one of the opposing states of Mecklenburg. Friedrich and Johann had recaptured the town of Prenzlau on August 23.
- November 7 – In Vietnam's Lam Sơn uprising against Chinese rule, Vietnamese rebels led by General Nguyễn Xí defeat a much larger force of the army of Ming dynasty China at the Battle of Tot Dong and Chuc Dong near what is now Hanoi, with at least 20,000 of the 54,000 Chinese troops killed.
- December 30 – A peace treaty is signed in Venice between the Republic of Venice (led by the Doge Francesco Foscari) and the Duchy of Milan (ruled by the Duke Filippo Maria Visconti), through the mediation the papal envoy, Cardinal Niccolò Albergati. Milan is required to relinquish control of Brescia and Vercelli to Venice, but regains control of its former lands in Liguria.

==== Date unknown ====
- Castello Orsini-Odescalchi is built in Bracciano, Italy by the Orsini family.
- Eunuch-dominated secret police start to control the palace guards and imperial workshops, infiltrate the civil service, and head all foreign missions in China.

=== 1427 ===
==== January–June ====
- January 16 – The papacy of Pope Gabriel V of Alexandria, leader of the Coptic Orthodox Church in Egypt, ends with his death after a reign of more than 17 years.
- January – Radu II of Wallachia resumes the throne of Wallachia for the fourth time, but a seven-year struggle for it ends in March when he is defeated in battle, and probably killed, by Dan II, who resumes the throne for a fifth term.
- February 23 – In Spain, the first tremors are felt in the Principality of Catalonia of what will become a devastating 6.7 magnitude earthquake that will happen less than a year later, on February 2, 1428.
- March 29 – In Vietnam, the Ming dynasty China army invades a second time, bringing 120,000 reinforcement troops led by General Mu Sheng to crush the Lam Sơn uprising.

==== April–June ====
- April 22 – In France, Edmund Beaufort, 2nd Duke of Somerset, is granted the control of the county of Mortain in Normandy by the Duke of Bedford, Regent for King Henry VI in France, as a reward for his military service during the war against the French.
- May 11 (16 Pashons, 1143 AM) – At Alexandria, Farag El-Maksi is elected as the new Patriarch of the Coptic Orthodox Christians and takes the regnal name of Pope John XI.
- June 7 – Pope Martin V orders the Roman Catholic bishops of Portro and Alba to work on driving the Fraticelli faction of the Franciscan Order from Italy.
- June 16 – John, Margrave of Brandenburg-Kulmbach ("the Alchemist", of the Hohenzollern family), signs a peace agreement with the dukes of the various Pomeranian duchies at the Brandenburg city of Templin, ending the latest Pomeranian-Brandenburg conflict.
- June 27 – John III, Duke of Mecklenburg-Stargard, is released from imprisonment after swearing an oath of allegiance to John, Margrave of Brandenburg.

==== July–September ====
- July 15 – The Siege of Montargis is started in France by 1,000 Englishmen led by the Earl of Warwick and lasts for seven weeks.
- July 19 – Stefan Lazarević, ruler of the Serbian Despotate, dies at Belgrade and is succeeded by his nephew, Đurađ Branković.
- August 4 – Hussite Wars: Battle of Tachov – The Hussites decisively beat the crusader armies, ending the Fourth Anti-Hussite Crusade.
- August 17 – The first band of Gypsies visits Paris, according to an account of the citizens of Paris.

==== October–December ====
- September 5 – A French Army relief force of 1,600 soldiers, led by Jean de Dunois, ends the siege of Montargis by luring the English Army into a trap. The Montargis defenders open the city gates and the English are attacked from two sides, losing more than 1,000 men and all of their artillery.
- September 29 – Lam Sơn uprising: China's General Liu Sheng arrives at China's border with Vietnam where a meeting is held with rebel leader Lê Lợi, who proposes settling the war by recognizing Tran Cao's rule as King of Đại Việt. The proposal is a pretext for Liu Sheng's army being lured into an ambush that soon follows, with 70,000 Chinese troops killed.
- October 13 –
  - Lincoln College, a constituent college of the University of Oxford in England, is founded by the Bishop of Lincoln.
  - The English Parliament assembles at Westminster after being summoned on July 15 by England's Regency Council. John Tyrrell is elected as Speaker of the House of Commons.
- November 12 – To avoid further destruction of the Chinese army, General Wang Tong begins withdrawing troops from northern Vietnam's Jiaozhi region, having accepted a proposal by Vietnam without the approval of China's Xuande Emperor. The Emperor is informed of the proposal and agrees on November 20 to accept terms of peace.
- December 29 – Victorious in the Lam Sơn uprising, Đại Việt (Vietnam) succeeds in forcing the withdrawal of Chinese troops from its territory as China's General Wang Tong and Vietnam's General Nguyễn Trãi agree to terms of disarmament and repatriation of 86,640 Ming Chinese prisoners in return for Chinese withdrawal.

==== Date unknown ====
- Minrekyansa becomes King of Ava (ancient Myanmar).
- The Conflict of Druimnacour occurs in Sutherland, Scotland.
- The first witch hunts begin, in Switzerland.
- The Celestine Order is established in France.
- The Celebration of Sant Jordi (Saint George) begins in Catalonia (he will later become its patron saint).
- Bremen is expelled from the Hanseatic League.
- Diogo de Silves, Portuguese navigator, discovers seven islands of the Azores archipelago.
- Battle of the Echinades: A Byzantine fleet defeats the fleet of Carlo I Tocco.
- Itzcoatl becomes the 4th Tlatoani of Tenochtitlan, after his nephew Chimalpopoca is killed by the Maxtla, at Azcapotzalco.
- Bhaktapur Royal Palace in Nepal is built by King Yaksa Malla.

=== 1428 ===
==== January–March ====
- January 4 – Friedrich II of the House of Wettin, nicknamed "Friedrich, der Sanftmütige" ("Frederick the Gentle") becomes the new Elector of Saxony at the age of 15, upon the death of his father "Frederick the Warlike".
- February 2 – The Catalonia earthquake takes place in the Catalonian region of Spain during Candlemas, estimated later at 6.5 magnitude, with extreme damage to the city of Roussillon and to the village of Queralbs. The quake collapses a church in Puigcerdà, killing more than 100 people, and 1,000 overall.
- February 20 – Zhu Qizhen, son of China's Emperor Xuanzong of Ming, is named as the Crown Prince of Ming dynasty China by his father. He will become the Emperor Yingzong of Ming in 1435.
- March 25 –
  - China's Emperor Xuanzong of Ming directs Admiral Zheng He to oversee the rebuilding of the Porcelain Tower of Nanjing. The construction of the temple was completed in 1431.
  - The Fifth Parliament of King Henry VI of England closes its session, as the King grants royal assent to the Commissioners of Sewers Act 1427, the Wages of Artificers Act granting the justices of peace power to "assign the wages of artificers and workmen by proclamation", and the Assizes Act and the Exigent on Indictment Act which both set statutes of limitation on certain proceedings.
- March 27 – Casimir V, Duke of Pomerania becomes the sole ruler of Pomerania-Stettin in Germany upon the death of his brother, Otto II, after the two had ruled jointly since 1413.

==== April–June ====
- April 6 – Dano-Hanseatic War (1426–1435): The bombardment of Copenhagen, capital of Denmark, by ships of the Northern German Hanseatic League takes place and is repelled by the Danish Navy.
- April 19 – A truce is reached to halt the Wars in Lombardy six months after the Venetian Army destroyed the Milanese town of Maclodio on October 11. The Duchy of Milan cedes the city of Bergamo to the Republic of Venice and the war halts for two years.
- April 22 – After an attack by the Ottoman Empire on Venetian outposts on the Greek island of Euboea, the Republic of Venice, presided over by the Doge Francesco Foscari, authorizes Admiral Andrea Mocenigo to organize 15 warships to hunt and destroy the Ottoman raiders.
- April 29 – The coronation of the Vietnamese rebel leader Le Loi as the King of Dai Viet takes place in Hanoi (at the time referred to as Thang Long). King Le Loi renames the Viet capital as "Dong Kinh".
- May 13 – Joan of Arc makes her first attempt to reach the Armagnac court at Chinon, arriving at Vaucouleurs speaking to Robert de Baudricourt, captain of the royal garrison, and tells him that God told her in a vision that she had a mission to help restore the Dauphin Charles to the throne. Baudricourt initially declines her request to be given an escort to visit Charles in person.
- June 3 – Dan II leads an army against the Ottomans at Golubac Fortress, obtaining a treaty that will allow him a semi-peaceful rule in Wallachia, until 1432.
- June 15 – In second bombardment of Copenhagen by the Hanseatic League, all but three of the Danish Navy's ships are destroyed by the Hanseatic cannons, capable of shooting aartillery at greater distances than Denmark is technologically capable of achieving.

==== July–September ====
- July 3 – The Treaty of Delft is signed by the Countess Jacqueline of Holland as a surrender to Philip, Duke of Burgundy to end the siege of Gouda by the Cod Forces against Holland, Zeeland and Hainaut during the Hook and Cod Wars. Under the pact, Jacqueline retains her title and nominal powers, but Philip administers the government and the right to inherit control.
- July 12 – King James I of Scotland gives royal assent to the Oath by Queen Act 1428 (De juramento prestando Domine Regine) passed by the Parliament of Scotland at Perth.
- August 7 – The Valais witch trials begin in Swiss Savoy.
- August 30 – (20th day of the 7th month of Shōchō 1) Japan's Emperor Shōkō dies at the age of 27.
- September 7 – (29th day of the 7th month of Shōchō 1) Emperor Go-Hanazono, the 10-year old third cousin of the late Emperor Shoko accedes to the throne of Japan.

==== October–December ====
- October 12 – English forces under Thomas Montacute, 4th Earl of Salisbury, besiege Orléans. Jean de Dunois, the Bastard of Orléans, commands the defenders. Bombardment starts on October 17 and troops attempt an assault on
- October 21 – Siege of Orléans: After four days of bombardment, English troops attempt an assault on the boulevart of the city walls but the French defenders hold the attackers back with missile fire, rope nets, scalding oil, hot coals and quicklime. p.383
- October 24 – Thomas Montacute, 4th Earl of Salisbury, is mortally wounded in an unsuccessful assault on Orléans. He is succeeded in command by William de la Pole, 4th Earl of Suffolk.
- November 11 – The Battle of Kratzau takes place in Bohemia in what is now the city of Chrastava in the Czech Republic, as the Silesian troops of the Bohemian Crown Lands under of the Holy Roman Empire (Upper Lusatia, the duchies of Jawor and Wroclaw, Polenz, Lower Lusatia and the Duchy of Żagań, led by Hans von Polenz, repel an attack by the Sirotci Hussites led by Jan Královec.
- December 2 – The Appenzell Wars come to an end in Switzerland as Frederick VII, Count of Toggenburg and knights of the Order of St. George's Shield defeat the rebel army of the Canton of Appenzell in a battle on the field between Gossau and Herisau. In a truce the next year, Appenzell is forced to repay the back taxes owed to the owed the Abbey of St. Gallbut is relieved from future obligations.
- December 27 – In the Battle of Stary Wielisław (now in Poland), the Hussites are defeated in an attack by the Bohemian forces led by the Silesian Duke John I of Münsterberg (who is killed in the fighting) and Půta III of Častolovice, Governor of Klodzko Land.

==== Date unknown ====
- The Aztec Empire is formed by the triple alliance of the Aztec city-states Tenochtitlán, Texcoco and Tlacopán and defeats Azcapotzalco to win control of the Valley of Mexico. Itzcóatl becomes 1st emperor.
- A serious fire occurs at Baynard's Castle in the City of London, England.
- Lam Sơn uprising: Lê Lợi, founder of the Lê dynasty in Vietnam, liberates Annam (the territory occupied by Ming dynasty China in 1407) and restores the kingdom as Đại Việt.

=== 1429 ===
==== January–March ====
- January 6 – The Congress of Lutsk opened in the Grand Duchy of Lithuania at the castle of Liubartas in Lutsk. In addition to the Lithuanian nobles gathered there with the Supreme Duke of Lithuania Władysław II Jagiełło and the Grand Duke Vytautas, the Congress was attended by Sigismund, King of Germany, Bohemia, Hungary and Croatia; Erik VII, King of Denmark; a Komtur of the Teutonic Knights; Vasily II, Grand Prince of Moscow; Boris, Duke of Tver; Ivan III, Duke of Ryazan; the Voivode Dan II of Wallachia; and representatives of the Pope, the Byzantine Empire and Moldavia, to discuss the coronation of Vytautas as the King of Lithuania, as well as the siege of Moldavia, entering a against the Ottoman Empire, the ongoing war between Denmark and the Hanseatic League, religious unions and divisions, and assorted economic, trade, and tax-related issues.
- February 12 – Battle of Rouvray (or "of the Herrings"): English forces under Sir John Fastolf defend a supply convoy, which is carrying rations (food) to the army of William de la Pole, 4th Earl of Suffolk at Orléans, from attack by the Comte de Clermont and John Stewart.
- March 8 – After hearing that Joan of Arc says that voices from heaven have told her that she will lead a royalist army to relieve the siege of Orleans and help him secure the French throne, the Dauphin Charles of France meets with her at the Château de Chinon and is persuaded that he should provide her supplies and troops.
- March 20 – Constantine XI Palaiologos, Emperor of Byzantium, begins the siege of the Greek port of Patras, which is controlled by the Venetian Republic. The city surrenders to the Byzantines on June 1.

==== April–June ====
- April 18 – (1st waning of Kason 791 ME) In what is now Myanmar, Min Saw Mun is restored as King of Arakan at the capital, Launggyet, with the help of troops from the Bengal Sultanate and from Afghan mercenaries. He then moves the capital to the city of Mrauk U.
- April 29 – Siege of Orléans: Joan of Arc enters Orléans with a relief expedition.
- May 7 – The Tourelles, the last English siege fortification at Orléans, falls. Joan of Arc becomes the hero of the battle by returning, wounded, to lead the final charge.
- May 8 – The English, weakened by disease and lack of supplies, depart Orléans.
- June 18 – Battle of Patay: French forces under Joan of Arc smash the English forces under Lord Talbot and Sir John Fastolf, forcing the withdrawal of the English from the Loire Valley.

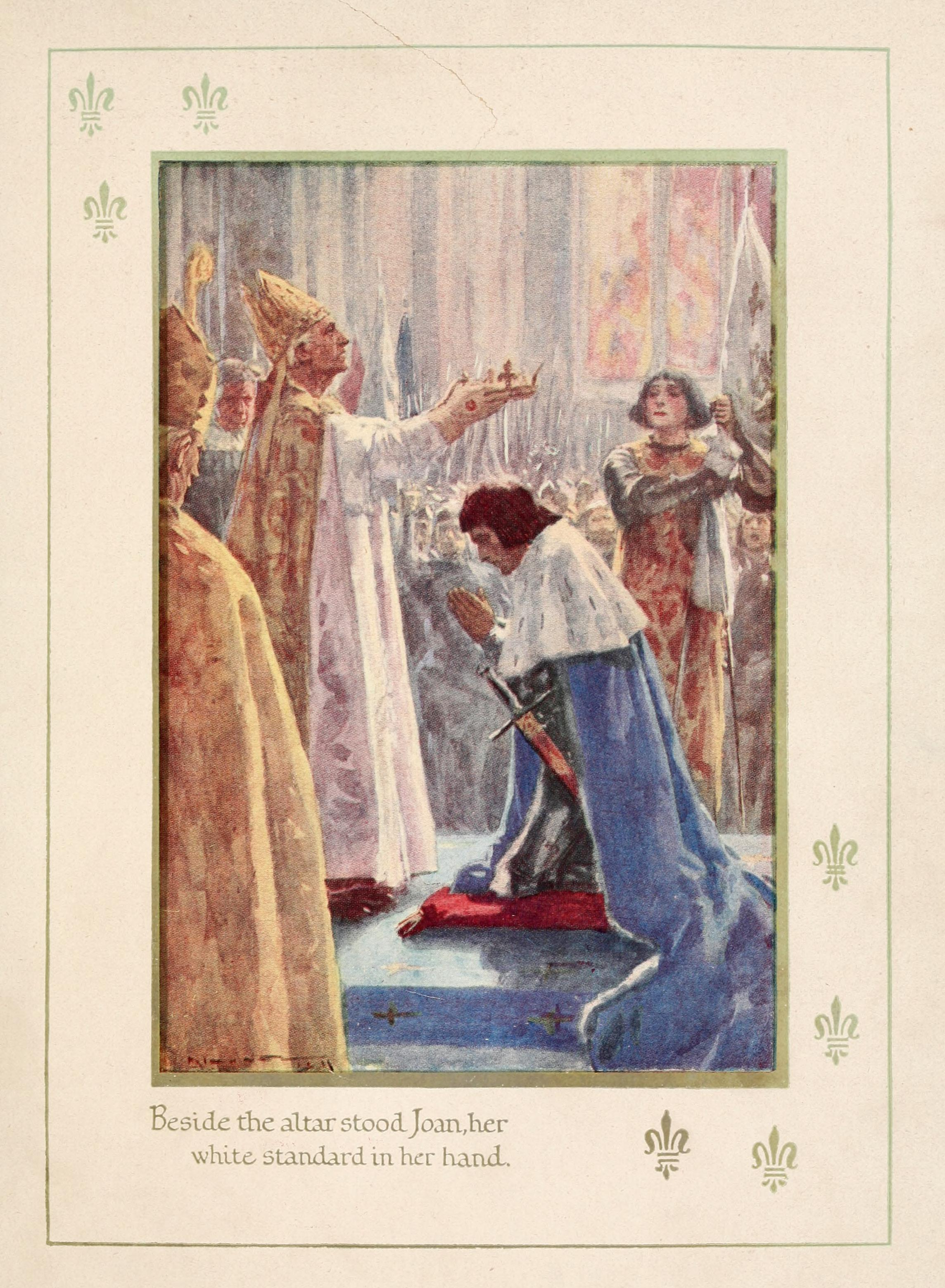
July 17: The coronation of King Charles VII takes place at Rheims.

==== July–September ====
- July 17 – The Dauphin is crowned as King Charles VII of France is crowned in Rheims.
- August 28 – Mehmed Nizamüddin is appointed the new Grand Vizier of the Ottoman Empire by the Sultan Murad II.
- September 8 – Joan of Arc leads an unsuccessful attack on Paris, and is wounded.
- September 18 – 18 (Dhu al-Hijjah 832 AH) The Hafsid Sultanate Saracens, ruled by the Hafsid Caliph Abu Faris Abd al-Aziz II and commanded by Kaid Ridavan, depart from Tunis with 70 ships and 18,000 troops in an attempt to capture Malta, but are repelled by its defenders.
- September 22 – The English Parliament assembles at Westminster after being summoned by King Henry VI, and the House of Commons elects William Alington as Speaker of the House.

==== October–December ====
- October 12 – The Kamenz massacre of 1,200 Catholics by the Protestant Hussites takes place in the village of Kamenz in the Electorate of Saxony.
- October 19 – Princess Isabella of Portugal, daughter of King João I, departs her homeland, accompanied by a flotilla of 20 ships and 2,000 Portuguese troops and royal officials, to make the voyage to the Duchy of Burgundy, where she is to formally marry Philip the Good, Duke of Burgundy. Because of storms, the voyage takes more than two months.
- November 4 – Armagnac–Burgundian Civil War: Joan of Arc liberates Saint-Pierre-le-Moûtier.
- November 6 – The formal coronation of the 6-year-old Henry VI as King of England takes place at Westminster Abbey.
- November 24 – Joan of Arc besieges La Charité.
- December 25 – Princess Isabella arrives at Sluys in Burgundy after storms have sunk many of the 20 ships that had been in her convoy that had left on October 19 from Portugal. She disembarks the next day to meet Philip.

==== Date unknown ====
- Fire destroys Turku.
- A series of seven customs offices and barriers are installed along the Grand Canal of China, during the reign of the Ming Dynasty's Yongle Emperor.
- Andreyas Succeeds Yeshaq I as Emperor of Ethiopia

== Births ==
1420

- February 9 – Dorothea of Brandenburg, Duchess of Mecklenburg (d. 1491)
- April 23 – George of Poděbrady, King of Bohemia (d. 1471)
- June 5 – Anna of Saxony, Landgravine of Hesse, German royalty (d. 1462)
- July 19 – William VIII, Marquess of Montferrat (d. 1483)
- October 1 – Elisabeth of Cleves, Countess of Schwarzburg-Blankenburg, German noble (d. 1488)
- October 14 – Tomás de Torquemada, first grand inquisitor of Spain (d. 1498)
- approximate date
  - Jean Fouquet, French painter (d. 1481)
  - Nicolas Jenson, French engraver (d. 1480)

1421

- March 9 – Francesco Sassetti, Italian banker (d. 1490)
- May 29 – Charles, Prince of Viana (d. 1461)
- June 3 – Giovanni di Cosimo de' Medici, Italian noble (d. 1463)
- July 25 – Henry Percy, 3rd Earl of Northumberland, English politician (d. 1461)
- August 1 – Thomas Dutton, English knight (d. 1459)
- October 10 – John Paston, English politician (d. 1466)
- December 6 – King Henry VI of England (d. 1471)
- date unknown – Sōgi, Japanese poet and Buddhist priest (d. 1502)

1422

- March 8 – Jacopo Piccolomini-Ammannati, Italian Catholic cardinal (d. 1479)
- June 7 – Federico da Montefeltro, Duke of Urbino (d. 1482)
- October 5 – Catherine, Princess of Asturias, Spanish royal (d. 1424)
- November 27 – Gaston IV, Count of Foix, French nobleman from Bearn (d. 1472)
- November 29 – Thomas Percy, 1st Baron Egremont, English baron (d. 1460)
- date unknown – Abul-Qasim Babur Mirza, Timurid ruler in Khurasan (d. 1457)
- probable – William Caxton, English printer (d. c. 1491)
- approximate – Agnès Sorel, French courtier, mistress of Charles VII of France (d. 1450)

1423

- April 4 – Johann II of Nassau-Saarbrücken, Count of Nassau-Saarbrücken (1429–1472) (d. 1472)
- May 18 – Lady Katherine Percy, English nobility (d. 1475)
- May 30 – Georg von Peuerbach, Austrian astronomer (d. 1461)
- June 2 – Ferdinand I of Naples (d. 1494)
- June 15 – Gabriele Sforza, Archbishop of Milan (d. 1457)
- July 3 – Louis XI, monarch of the House of Valois, King of France from 1461 to 1483 (d. 1483)
- July 6 – Antonio Manetti, Italian mathematician and architect (d. 1497)
- August 24 – Thomas Rotherham, English cleric (d. 1500)
- September 10 – Eleanor, Princess of Asturias (d. 1425)
- August – Demetrios Chalkokondyles, Greek scholar (d. 1511)

1424

- January 1 – Louis IV, Elector Palatine (1436–1449) (d. 1449)
- June 9 – Blanche II of Navarre (d. 1464)
- August – Demetrios Chalkokondyles, Greek scholar (d. 1511)
- October 31 – King Władysław III of Poland (d. 1444)
- December 8 – Anselm Adornes, Merchant, politician and diplomat (d. 1483)
- December 25 – Margaret Stewart, Dauphine of France (d. 1445)
- August 10 or 1426 – Boniface III, Marquess of Montferrat (d. 1494)
- date unknown – Abu Sa'id Mirza, ruler of Persia and Afghanistan (d. 1469)
- date unknown – Mary of Looz-Heinsberg, Dutch noble woman (d. 1502)

1425

- January 5 – Henry IV of Castile (d. 1474)
- March 21 – Henry Beauchamp, 1st Duke of Warwick, English nobleman (d. 1446)
- March 31 – Bianca Maria Visconti, Duchess of Milan (d. 1468)
- April 30 – William III, Landgrave of Thuringia (1445–1482) and Duke of Luxembourg (1457–1482) (d. 1482)
- October 14 – Alesso Baldovinetti, Italian painter (d. 1499)
- November 18 – Kunigunde of Sternberg, first spouse of King George of Poděbrady (d. 1449)
- date unknown
  - Edmund Sutton, English nobleman (d. 1483)
  - Krokodeilos Kladas, Greek military leader (d. 1490)
  - Xicotencatl I, ruler of Tizatlan (in modern-day Mexico) (d. 1522)

1426

- February 2 – Eleanor of Navarre, queen regnant of Navarre (d. 1479)
- February – Christian of Oldenburg, King of Denmark 1448–1481, of Norway 1450–1481 and of Sweden 1457–1464 (d. 1481)
- July 13 – Anne Neville, Countess of Warwick (d. 1492)
- September 19 – Maria of Cleves, French noble (d. 1487)
- November 30 – Johann IV Roth, Roman Catholic bishop (d. 1506)
- date unknown – John II, Duke of Bourbon (d. 1488)

1427

- February 27 – Ruprecht, Archbishop of Cologne (d. 1480)
- May 8 – John Tiptoft, 1st Earl of Worcester, Lord High Treasurer (d. 1470)
- May 29 – Françoise d'Amboise, duchess consort of Brittany, co-founder of the first monastery of the Carmelites in France (d. 1485)
- June 22 – Lucrezia Tornabuoni, Italian writer, adviser and spouse of Piero di Cosimo de' Medici (d. 1482)
- September 9 – Thomas de Ros, 9th Baron de Ros, English politician (d. 1464)
- October 26 – Archduke Sigismund of Austria (d. 1496)
- November 24 – John Stafford, 1st Earl of Wiltshire (d. 1473)
- November 29 – Zhengtong Emperor of China (d. 1464)
- November 30 – Casimir IV Jagiellon, King of Poland (d. 1492)
- date unknown – Shen Zhou, Chinese painter (d. 1509)

1428

- February 3 – Helena Palaiologina, Queen of Cyprus (d. 1458)
- April 7 – William Percy, late medieval Bishop of Carlisle (d. 1462)
- May 3 – Pedro González de Mendoza, Spanish cardinal and statesman (d. 1495)
- July 4 – Filippo Strozzi the Elder, Italian banker (d. 1491)
- September 21 – Jingtai Emperor of China (d. 1457)
- November 2 – Yolande, Duchess of Lorraine (d. 1483)
- November 22 – Richard Neville, 16th Earl of Warwick, English nobleman, known as "the Kingmaker" (d. 1471)
- December 4 – Bernard VII, Lord of Lippe (1429–1511) (d. 1511)
- date unknown – Donato Acciaioli, Italian scholar (d. 1478)
  - Maria Ormani, Italian artist, scribe and illuminator
- probable – Didrik Pining, German explorer (approximate date)

1429

- January 17 – Antonio del Pollaiuolo, Italian artist (d.c. 1498)
- date unknown – Peter, Constable of Portugal (d. 1466)
- probable – Mino da Fiesole, Florentine sculptor (d. 1484)

== Deaths ==
1420

- June 11 – John III, Burgrave of Nuremberg (b. c. 1369)
- June 12 – Adolf I, Count of Nassau-Siegen (b. 1362)
- August – Michael I, ruler of Wallachia (killed in battle)
- August 9 – Pierre d'Ailly, French theologian and cardinal (b. 1351)
- September 3 – Robert Stewart, Duke of Albany, regent of Scotland (b. 1339)
- date unknown
  - Marina Galina, Dogaressa of Venice
  - Epiphanius the Wise, Russian hagiographer
  - King Lukeni lua Nimi of the Kingdom of Kongo (b. 1380)

1421

- January 10 – Niccolò I Trinci, lord of Foligno (assassinated)
- January 15 – Helvis of Brunswick-Grubenhagen, queen consort of Armenia and Cyprus (born 1353)
- March 22 – Thomas of Lancaster, 1st Duke of Clarence, second son of Henry IV of England (killed in battle) (born 1388)
- April 21 – John FitzAlan, 13th Earl of Arundel (born 1385)
- May – Balša III, ruler of Zeta
- May 26 – Mehmed I, Ottoman Sultan (b. 1389)
- June 21 – Jean Le Maingre, marshal of France (b. 1366)

1422

- March 9 – Jan Želivský, Hussite priest (executed) (b. 1380)
- July 8 – Michelle of Valois, French princess and duchess consort of Burgundy (b. 1395)
- August 31 – King Henry V of England (b. 1386)
- September 17 – Emperor Constantine II of Bulgaria (b. after 1370)
- October 21 – King Charles VI of France (b. 1368)
- probable – Thomas Walsingham, English chronicler

1423

- January 23 – Margaret of Bavaria, Burgundian regent (b. 1363)
- March – Richard Whittington, Lord Mayor of London (b. 1358)
- May 23 – Antipope Benedict XIII (b. 1328)
- October 20 – Henry Bowet, Archbishop of York
- November 1 – Nicholas Eudaimonoioannes, Byzantine diplomat
- December 15 – Michael Küchmeister von Sternberg, Grand Master of the Teutonic Knights

1424

- January 4 – Muzio Sforza, Italian condottiero
- January 8 – Stephen Zaccaria, Latin Archbishop of Patras
- April 14 – Lucia Visconti, English countess (b. 1372)
- May 10 – Emperor Go-Kameyama of Japan
- June 5 – Braccio da Montone, Italian condottiero
- June 10 – Duke Ernest of Austria (b. 1377)
- June 16 – Johannes Ambundii, Archbishop of Riga
- August 12 – Emperor Cheng Zu of China (b. 1360)
- August 17 – John Stewart, Earl of Buchan (b. c. 1381)
- September 17 – Catherine, Princess of Asturias, Castilian royal (b. 1422)
- October 11 – Jan Žižka, Czech general and Hussite leader
- date unknown – Joan II, Countess of Auvergne (b. 1378)
- probable – Johannes Abezier, provost and bishop of the Teutonic Knights (b. 1380)

1425

- January 18 – Edmund Mortimer, 5th Earl of March, English politician (b. 1391)
- February 27 – Prince Vasily I of Moscow (b. 1371)
- March 17 – Ashikaga Yoshikazu, Japanese shōgun (b. 1407)
- May 24 – Murdoch Stewart, 2nd Duke of Albany, Scottish politician (b. 1362)
- May 29 – Hongxi Emperor of China (b. 1378)
- July 8 – Lady Elizabeth FitzAlan, English noble (b. 1366)
- July 21 – Manuel II Palaiologos, Byzantine Emperor (b. 1350)
- August 22 – Eleanor, Princess of Asturias (b. 1423)
- September 8 – King Charles III of Navarre (b. 1361)
- date unknown
  - Andrew of Wyntoun, Scottish chronicler (b. 1350)
  - Madhava of Sangamagrama, Indian mathematician (b. 1350)
  - Margareta, Swedish Sami missionary (b. 1369)
  - Yi Chongmu, Korean general (b. 1360)
  - Parameshvara, Indian mathematician (b. 1360)

1426

- March / May – Thomas Hoccleve, English poet (b. c. 1368)
- c. late May – Kale Kye-Taung Nyo, deposed King of Ava (b. c. 1385)
- September 18 – Hubert van Eyck, painter
- November 24 – Elizabeth of Lancaster, Duchess of Exeter, English Plantagent noblewoman, daughter of John of Gaunt (b. c. 1363)
- December – Pippo Spano, Hungarian military leader (b. 1369)
- December 31 – Thomas Beaufort, Duke of Exeter, English nobleman and military leader (b. c. 1377)
- date unknown – Tezozomoc, Tepanec ruler of Azcapotzalco and military leader

1427

- April 17 – John IV, Duke of Brabant (b. 1403)
- May 7 – Thomas la Warr, 5th Baron De La Warr, English churchman
- May 28 – Henry IV, Count of Holstein-Rendsburg (b. 1397)
- July 19 – Stefan Lazarević, Despot of Serbia (b. 1377)
- date unknown
  - Chimalpopoca, Aztec Tlatoani (ruler) of Tenochtitlán (b. 1397)
  - Qu You, Chinese novelist (b. 1341)
- probable
  - Jehuda Cresques, Catalan cartographer (b. 1350)
  - Gentile da Fabriano, Italian painter
  - Radu II Prasnaglava, ruler of Wallachia, probably killed in or after a lost battle

1428

- January 4 – Frederick I, Elector of Saxony (b. 1370)
- February 3 – Ashikaga Yoshimochi, Japanese shōgun (b. 1386)
- June 12 – Zawisza Czarny, Polish knight and diplomat
- August 27 – John I of Münsterberg, Duke of Ziebice (b. 1370)
- August 30 – Emperor Shōkō, emperor of Japan (b. 1401)
- Autumn – Masaccio, Italian painter (b. 1401)
- November 3 – Thomas Montacute, 4th Earl of Salisbury, English military leader (mortally wounded in battle) (b. 1388)
- November 4 – Sophia of Bavaria, Queen regent of Bohemia (b. 1376)
- date unknown
  - Maxtla, Tepanec ruler of Azcapotzalco
  - Paul of Venice, Catholic theologian
  - Isabella, Countess of Foix, French sovereign (b. 1361)
- probable – John Purvey, English theologian (b. 1353)

1429

- February – Giovanni di Bicci de' Medici, founder of the Medici dynasty of Florence (b. c. 1360)
- June 22 – Ghiyath al-Kashi, Persian mathematician and astronomer (b. 1380)
- July 4 – Carlo I Tocco, ruler of Epirus (b. 1372)
- July 12 – Jean Gerson, chancellor of the University of Paris (b. 1363)
- September 28 – Cymburgis of Masovia, Duchess of Austria by marriage to Duke Ernest the Iron of Inner Austria (b. 1394)
- October – Alexios IV Megas Komnenos, Empire of Trebizond (b. 1382)
- date unknown – Emperor Yeshaq I of Ethiopia (b. 1414)
