= Ali ibn Hasan ibn Ajlan =

Emir of Mecca from 1441 to 1443

Nūr al-Dīn ‘Alī ibn Ḥasan ibn ‘Ajlān al-Ḥasanī (Arabic: نور الدين علي بن حسن بن عجلان الحسني) was an Emir of Mecca from 1441 to 1443.

He was born around 807 AH (c. 1404/1405). His father was the Emir of Mecca Hasan ibn Ajlan.

He was appointed Emir of Mecca in place of his brother Barakat on Monday, 16 Jumada al-Awwal 845 AH (2 October 1441). News of his appointment reached Mecca on Wednesday morning, 14 Rajab 845 AH (29 November 1441). That evening Barakat left Mecca and the dua was made for the Emir, but no name was mentioned. The following night the dua was made in Ali's name. He himself entered Mecca on 2 Sha'ban (c. 16 December 1441). His diploma of investiture was dated 23 Jumada al-Thani (c. 8 November 1441).

Ali was deposed in favor of his brother Abu al-Qasim in Shawwal 846 AH (February 1443).
