= 1426 =

1426 in various calendars
- Gregorian calendar: 1426; MCDXXVI
- Ab urbe condita: 2179
- Armenian calendar: 875; ԹՎ ՊՀԵ
- Assyrian calendar: 6176
- Balinese saka calendar: 1347–1348
- Bengali calendar: 832–833
- Berber calendar: 2376
- English Regnal year: 4 Hen. 6 – 5 Hen. 6
- Buddhist calendar: 1970
- Burmese calendar: 788
- Byzantine calendar: 6934–6935
- Chinese calendar: 乙巳年 (Wood Snake); 4123 or 3916 — to — 丙午年 (Fire Horse); 4124 or 3917
- Coptic calendar: 1142–1143
- Discordian calendar: 2592
- Ethiopian calendar: 1418–1419
- Hebrew calendar: 5186–5187
- Hindu calendars
- Vikram Samvat: 1482–1483
- Shaka Samvat: 1347–1348
- Kali Yuga: 4526–4527
- Holocene calendar: 11426
- Igbo calendar: 426–427
- Iranian calendar: 804–805
- Islamic calendar: 829–830
- Japanese calendar: Ōei 33 (応永３３年)
- Javanese calendar: 1341–1342
- Julian calendar: 1426; MCDXXVI
- Korean calendar: 3759
- Minguo calendar: 486 before ROC 民前486年
- Nanakshahi calendar: −42
- Thai solar calendar: 1968–1969
- Tibetan calendar: ཤིང་མོ་སྦྲུལ་ལོ་ (female Wood-Snake); 1552 or 1171 or 399 — to — མེ་ཕོ་རྟ་ལོ་ (male Fire-Horse); 1553 or 1172 or 400

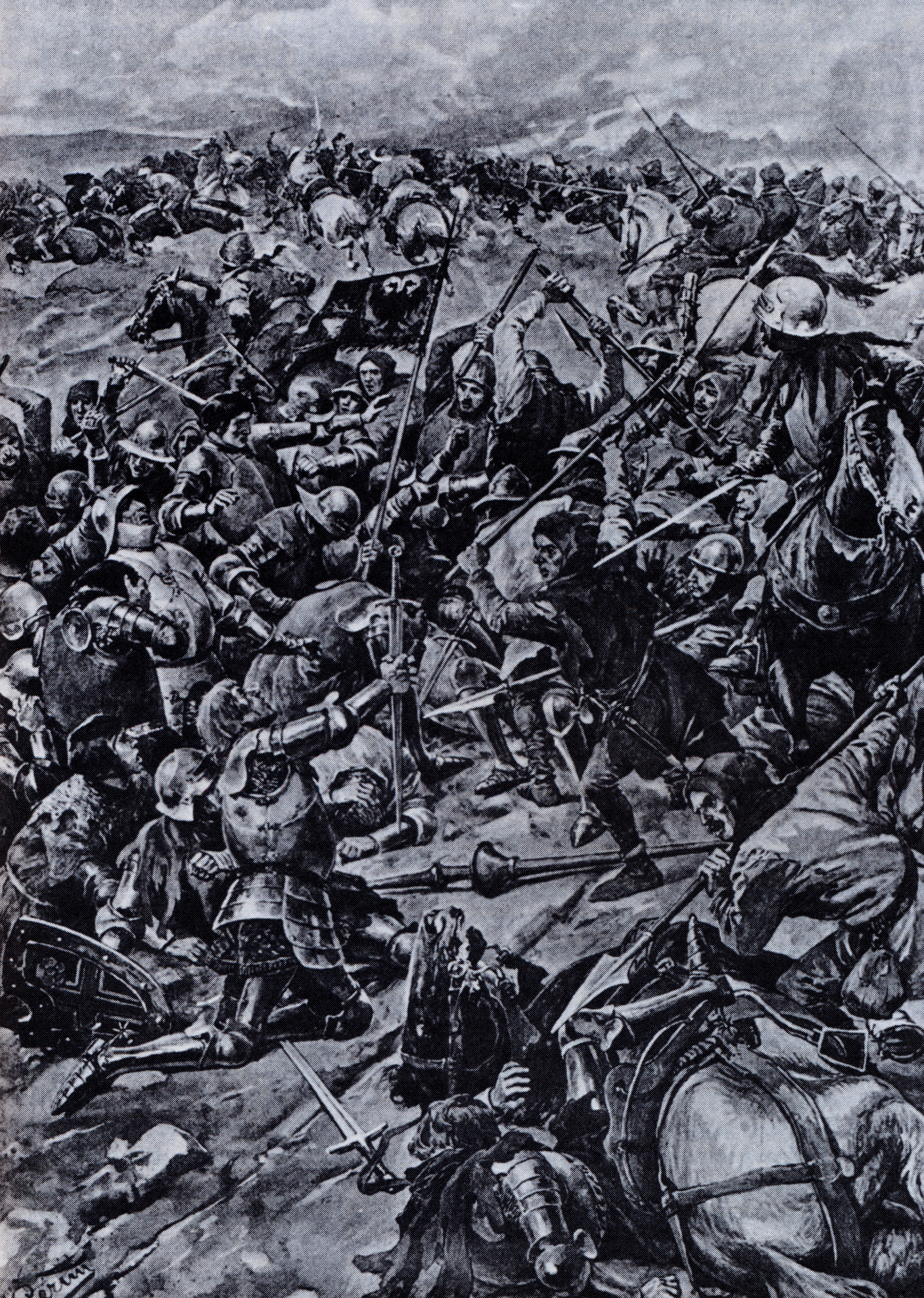
June 26: The Czech Hussites annihilate the German defenders of Aussig.

Year 1426 (MCDXXVI) was a common year starting on Tuesday of the Julian calendar.

== Events ==
=== January–March ===
- January 7 – King Henry VI summons the Parliament of England, directing its members to meet at Leicester on February 18.
- January 13 – Hook and Cod wars: The Battle of Brouwershaven is fought in the Netherlands between the Burgundian State, led by Duke Philip the Good, and the troops led by Jacqueline, Countess of Hainaut, with the Burugundians winning.
- January 15 – England, led by Henry VI, declares war against the Duchy of Brittany and the Kingdom of France after Duke John V of Brittany (Jean le Sage) allies with France's King Charles VI.
- February 8 – The Xuande Era begins in Ming dynasty China as the first Lunar New Year of the reign of the Emperor Xuanzong.
- February 18 – The English Parliament, nicknamed the Parliament of Bats because the members are not allowed to carry swords and arm themselves with clubs to defend themselves, is opened by King Henry VI at Leicester. The House of Commons elects Richard Vernon as its speaker.
- March 6 – Hundred Years' War: After being besieged since February 27 in Saint-James (near Avranches in Normandy), a 600-strong force of English knights led by Sir Thomas Rempston routs a 16,000-strong French and Brittanian force under Arthur de Richemont, Constable of France, in the Battle of Saint-James. This forces the Duke of Brittany (Richemont's brother) to offer a truce and on September 8 to acknowledge Henry VI of England's suzerainty over France.

=== April–June ===
- April 22 – The Second Scutari War between the Republic of Venice and the Serbian Despotate is formally ended by the signing of a treaty at the then Serbian city of Vushtrri in what is now Albania.
- April 25 (17 Jumada II 829 AH) – Hasan ibn Ajlan, who has been allowed to leave Cairo after being appointed by the Egyptian Mamluk Sultan as the Emir of Mecca and paying the first installment of a fee of 30,000 dinars, dies on the way back to Mecca. The Sultan, Al-Ashraf Sayf ad-Dīn Barsbāy, summons Hasan's sons Barakat ibn Hasan and Ibrahim ibn Hasan to Cairo to complete payment of the remaining 25,000 dinars owed.
- May 16 – In Burma, Kale Kye-Taung Nyo, ruler of the Kingdom of Ava, flees his capital. He is succeeded by Mohnyin Thado, who receives Thinkhaya III of Toungoo.
- June 1 – The Parliament of Bats closes in England. Among the laws given royal assent by King Henry VI are a provision that writs and lawsuits against people who were later given knighthood "shall not abate for that cause," and another giving "licence to all the King's subjects to transport corn.
- June 16 – Hussite Wars – Battle of Aussig: The Hussites decisively beat the crusading armies of Germany in the Fourth Anti-Hussite Crusade and then annihilate the town of Aussig (now Ústí nad Labem) the next day.

=== July–September ===
- July 7 – Battle of Khirokitia: King Janus of Cyprus is defeated by Egyptian troops under Ibn bint al-Aqsarayi and captured by the Mamluks and brought to Egypt, where he is ransomed after ten months.
- August 16 (11 Shawwal 829 AH) – Barakat ibn Hasan, son of the late Hasan ibn Ajlan, is confirmed by the Egyptian Sultan Barsbay as the new Emir of Mecca, conditioned on paying the remaining 25,000 dinars owed by Hasan.
- September 17 (15 Dhu al-Qidah 829 AH) – Barakat ibn Hasan arrives in Mecca to officially assume the powers of the Emir of Mecca, after taking back over from his brother Abu al-Qasim.

=== October–December ===
- October 12 – Uckermark War (1425–1427): Representing Brandenburg, the Elector Friedrich and his son Johann "the alchemist" sign a treaty with William of Werle, ruler of one of the opposing states of Mecklenburg. Friedrich and Johann had recaptured the town of Prenzlau on August 23.
- November 7 – In Vietnam's Lam Sơn uprising against Chinese rule, Vietnamese rebels led by General Nguyễn Xí defeat a much larger force of the army of Ming dynasty China at the Battle of Tot Dong and Chuc Dong near what is now Hanoi, with at least 20,000 of the 54,000 Chinese troops killed.
- December 30 – A peace treaty is signed in Venice between the Republic of Venice (led by the Doge Francesco Foscari) and the Duchy of Milan (ruled by the Duke Filippo Maria Visconti), through the mediation the papal envoy, Cardinal Niccolò Albergati. Milan is required to relinquish control of Brescia and Vercelli to Venice, but regains control of its former lands in Liguria.

=== Date unknown ===
- The Dano-Hanseatic War started.
- Castello Orsini-Odescalchi is built in Bracciano, Italy by the Orsini family.
- Eunuch-dominated secret police start to control the palace guards and imperial workshops, infiltrate the civil service, and head all foreign missions in China.

== Births ==
- February 2 – Eleanor of Navarre, queen regnant of Navarre (d. 1479)
- February – Christian of Oldenburg, King of Denmark 1448–1481, of Norway 1450–1481 and of Sweden 1457–1464 (d. 1481)
- July 13 – Anne Neville, Countess of Warwick (d. 1492)
- September 19 – Maria of Cleves, French noble (d. 1487)
- November 30 – Johann IV Roth, Roman Catholic bishop (d. 1506)
- date unknown – John II, Duke of Bourbon (d. 1488)

== Deaths ==
- March / May – Thomas Hoccleve, English poet (b. c. 1368)
- c. late May – Kale Kye-Taung Nyo, deposed King of Ava (b. c. 1385)
- September 18 – Hubert van Eyck, painter
- November 24 – Elizabeth of Lancaster, Duchess of Exeter, English Plantagenet noblewoman, daughter of John of Gaunt (b. c. 1363)
- December – Pippo Spano, Hungarian military leader (b. 1369)
- December 31 – Thomas Beaufort, Duke of Exeter, English nobleman and military leader (b. c. 1377)
- date unknown – Tezozomoc, Tepanec ruler of Azcapotzalco and military leader
