= 1425 =

1425 in various calendars
- Gregorian calendar: 1425; MCDXXV
- Ab urbe condita: 2178
- Armenian calendar: 874; ԹՎ ՊՀԴ
- Assyrian calendar: 6175
- Balinese saka calendar: 1346–1347
- Bengali calendar: 831–832
- Berber calendar: 2375
- English Regnal year: 3 Hen. 6 – 4 Hen. 6
- Buddhist calendar: 1969
- Burmese calendar: 787
- Byzantine calendar: 6933–6934
- Chinese calendar: 甲辰年 (Wood Dragon); 4122 or 3915 — to — 乙巳年 (Wood Snake); 4123 or 3916
- Coptic calendar: 1141–1142
- Discordian calendar: 2591
- Ethiopian calendar: 1417–1418
- Hebrew calendar: 5185–5186
- Hindu calendars
- Vikram Samvat: 1481–1482
- Shaka Samvat: 1346–1347
- Kali Yuga: 4525–4526
- Holocene calendar: 11425
- Igbo calendar: 425–426
- Iranian calendar: 803–804
- Islamic calendar: 828–829
- Japanese calendar: Ōei 32 (応永３２年)
- Javanese calendar: 1339–1341
- Julian calendar: 1425; MCDXXV
- Korean calendar: 3758
- Minguo calendar: 487 before ROC 民前487年
- Nanakshahi calendar: −43
- Thai solar calendar: 1967–1968
- Tibetan calendar: ཤིང་ཕོ་འབྲུག་ལོ་ (male Wood-Dragon); 1551 or 1170 or 398 — to — ཤིང་མོ་སྦྲུལ་ལོ་ (female Wood-Snake); 1552 or 1171 or 399

June 27: Zhu Zhanji is enthroned as the new Emperor of China, Xuande.

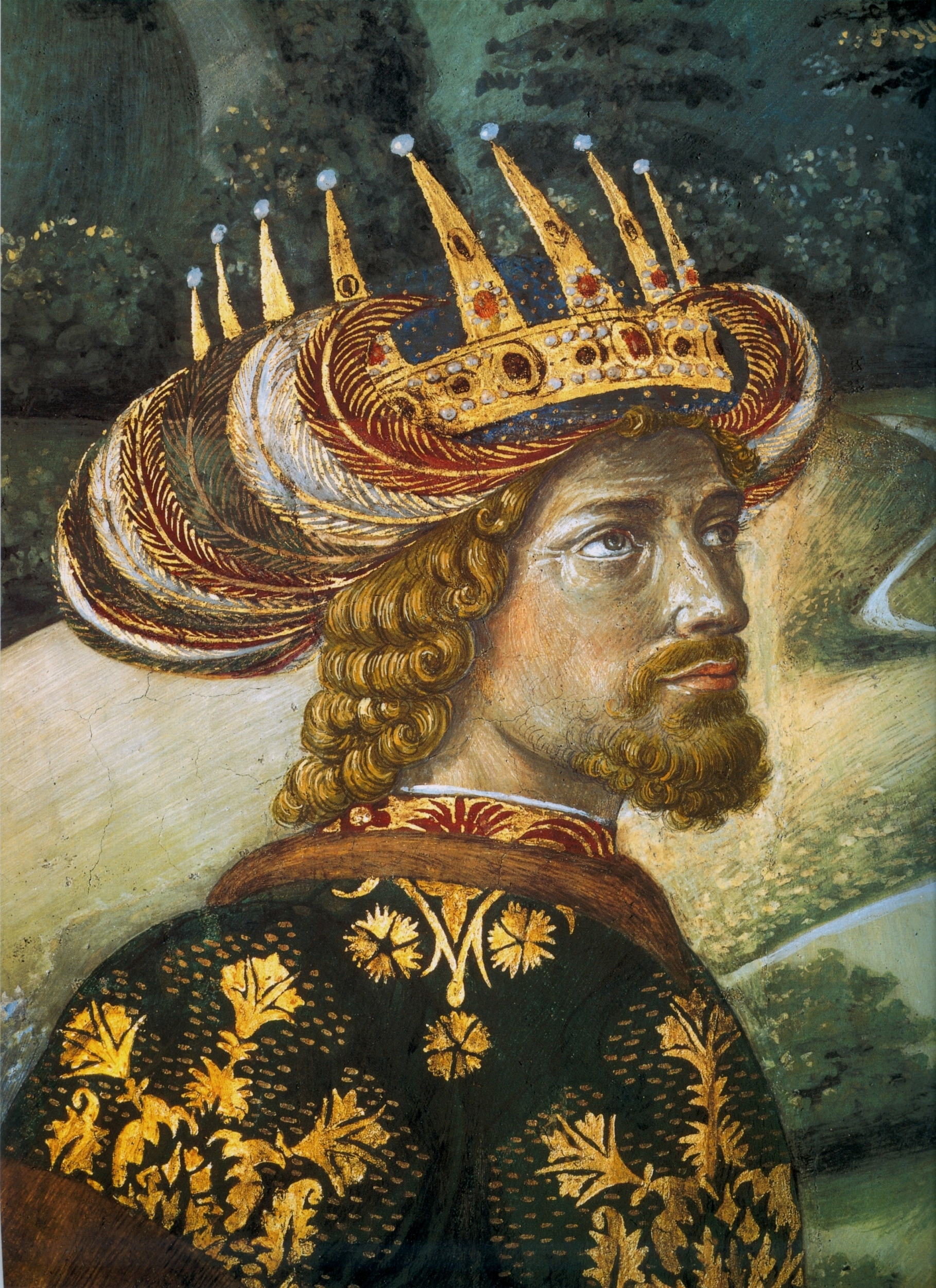
July 21: John VIII becomes the new Byzantine Emperor.

Year 1425 (MCDXXV) was a common year starting on Monday of the Julian calendar.

== Events ==
=== January – March ===
- January 8 – The interment of Ming dynasty China's Yongle Emperor, who died on August 12, takes place at the Chang Mausoleum in Beijing's Ming tombs.
- January 13 – The Venetian Republic's Great Council authorizes spending to equip 25 galleys for use as warships.
- January 19 – The Yongle Era ends in China and the Hongxi era begins.
- February 12 – Discrimination against the Caquins of Brittany is increased as the Duke of Brittany, Jean V, forbids the Caquins from engaging in trade.
- February 24 – King Henry VI of England summons the English Parliament, ordering the members to assemble on April 30 at Westminster.
- February 27 – 11 days shy of his tenth birthday, Vasily II becomes the new Grand Prince of Moscow upon the death of his father, Vasily I of Moscow. Vasily II's mother, Sophia of Lithuania, serves as his regent.
- March 12 – King James I of Scotland opens a brief session of the Scottish Parliament, which opens at Perth and ends after only five days.

=== April –June ===
- April 30 – The Third English Parliament of King Henry VI opens at Westminster for a session of almost three months. Thomas Walton is elected as Speaker of the House of Commons.
- May 29 – China's Emperor Renzong dies after a reign of only nine months. He is succeeded by his son, Prince Zhu Zhanji, who becomes the Xuande Emperor.
- June 27 – Zhu Zhanji is formally enthroned as the Ming dynasty Emperor of China as the Emperor Xuanzong, beginning the Xuande Era.

=== July –September ===
- July 14 – The English Parliament closes as King Henry VI gives royal assent to the Labourers Act 1425, the River Lee Navigation Act 1425 and laws requiring a royal license for exportation of sheep and for exportation of butter and cheese.
- July 21 – John VIII Palaiologos becomes the Emperor of Byzantium upon the death of the Emperor Manuel II Palaiologos.
- July 21 – The Great Council of Venice agrees to accept many of the demands by the residents of occupied Thessalonia and requests Venetian administrators to respect the customs and rights of the citizens and to work together with the Thessalonian local council of 12 nobles in the governance of the city.
- August 1 – In Germany, Frederick of Wettin is enfoeffed by Sigismund, King of the Germans at Ofen as the new Elector of Saxony
- August – (Tawthalin 787 ME); King Thihathu of Ava, the Burmese monarch in what is now Myanmar, is ambushed at Amarapura after being guided into a trap by one of his wives, Queen Shin Bo-Me. His 8-year-old nephew, Min Hla, becomes the new King while Shin Bo-Me seeks a way to take the throne for herself.
- September 8 – In Spain, King Carlos III of Navarre dies after a reign of 38 years. His daughter, Princess Bianca, becomes the Queen of Navarre and her husband, King John II of Aragon becomes her co-ruler.

=== October –December ===
- October 7 – King Charles VII of France and John V, the English Duke of Brittany, sign the Treaty of Saumur to settle the war between the kingdom and the duchy.
- October 17 – (4 Dhu al-Hijjah 828 AH) Hasan ibn Ajlan becomes the Emir of Mecca for the third and last time, after having been replaced for 18 months by Ali ibn Inan.
- November 9 – Kale Kye-Taung Nyo becomes King of Ava by having his lover, Queen Shin Bo-Me, assassinate his 8-year-old nephew, King Min Hla.
- December 9 – The Old University of Leuven, Belgium is founded.

=== Date unknown ===
- The Maltese people rise up against Don Gonsalvo Monroy, count of Malta. The insurgents repel an attempt by the Viceroy of Sicily to bring the island to order. The Maltese do not submit to Catalan-Aragonese rule, until the Magna Charta Libertatis, granting them their new rights, is delivered to them.
- Beijing, capital of China, becomes the largest city in the world, taking the lead from Nanjing (estimated date).
- By this year, paper currency in China is worth only 0.025% to 0.014% of its original value in the 14th century; this, and the counterfeiting of copper coin currency, will lead to a dramatic shift to using silver as the common medium of exchange in China.
- Sharafuddin Ali Yazdi's critical history of Persia, Zafar Nama, is completed under the auspices of Mirza Ibrahim Sultan, grandson of Timur.

== Births ==
- January 5 – Henry IV of Castile (d. 1474)
- March 21 – Henry Beauchamp, 1st Duke of Warwick, English nobleman (d. 1446)
- March 31 – Bianca Maria Visconti, Duchess of Milan (d. 1468)
- April 30 – William III, Landgrave of Thuringia (1445–1482) and Duke of Luxembourg (1457–1482) (d. 1482)
- October 14 – Alesso Baldovinetti, Italian painter (d. 1499)
- November 18 – Kunigunde of Sternberg, first spouse of King George of Poděbrady (d. 1449)
- date unknown
  - Edmund Sutton, English nobleman (d. 1483)
  - Krokodeilos Kladas, Greek military leader (d. 1490)
  - Xicotencatl I, ruler of Tizatlan (in modern-day Mexico) (d. 1522)

== Deaths ==
- January 18 – Edmund Mortimer, 5th Earl of March, English politician (b. 1391)
- February 27 – Prince Vasily I of Moscow (b. 1371)
- March 17 – Ashikaga Yoshikazu, Japanese shōgun (b. 1407)
- May 24 – Murdoch Stewart, Duke of Albany, Scottish politician (b. 1362)
- May 29 – Hongxi Emperor of China (b. 1378)
- July 8 – Elizabeth Fitzalan, Duchess of Norfolk, English noble (b. 1366)
- July 21 – Manuel II Palaiologos, Byzantine Emperor (b. 1350)
- August 22 – Eleanor, Princess of Asturias (b. 1423)
- September 8 – King Charles III of Navarre (b. 1361)
- date unknown
  - Andrew of Wyntoun, Scottish chronicler (b. 1350)
  - Madhava of Sangamagrama, Indian mathematician (b. 1350)
  - Margareta, Swedish Sami missionary (b. 1369)
  - Yi Chongmu, Korean general (b. 1360)
  - Parameshvara, Indian mathematician (b. 1360)
