= 1424 =

1424 in various calendars
- Gregorian calendar: 1424; MCDXXIV
- Ab urbe condita: 2177
- Armenian calendar: 873; ԹՎ ՊՀԳ
- Assyrian calendar: 6174
- Balinese saka calendar: 1345–1346
- Bengali calendar: 830–831
- Berber calendar: 2374
- English Regnal year: 2 Hen. 6 – 3 Hen. 6
- Buddhist calendar: 1968
- Burmese calendar: 786
- Byzantine calendar: 6932–6933
- Chinese calendar: 癸卯年 (Water Rabbit); 4121 or 3914 — to — 甲辰年 (Wood Dragon); 4122 or 3915
- Coptic calendar: 1140–1141
- Discordian calendar: 2590
- Ethiopian calendar: 1416–1417
- Hebrew calendar: 5184–5185
- Hindu calendars
- Vikram Samvat: 1480–1481
- Shaka Samvat: 1345–1346
- Kali Yuga: 4524–4525
- Holocene calendar: 11424
- Igbo calendar: 424–425
- Iranian calendar: 802–803
- Islamic calendar: 827–828
- Japanese calendar: Ōei 31 (応永３１年)
- Javanese calendar: 1338–1339
- Julian calendar: 1424; MCDXXIV
- Korean calendar: 3757
- Minguo calendar: 488 before ROC 民前488年
- Nanakshahi calendar: −44
- Thai solar calendar: 1966–1967
- Tibetan calendar: ཆུ་མོ་ཡོས་ལོ་ (female Water-Hare); 1550 or 1169 or 397 — to — ཤིང་ཕོ་འབྲུག་ལོ་ (male Wood-Dragon); 1551 or 1170 or 398

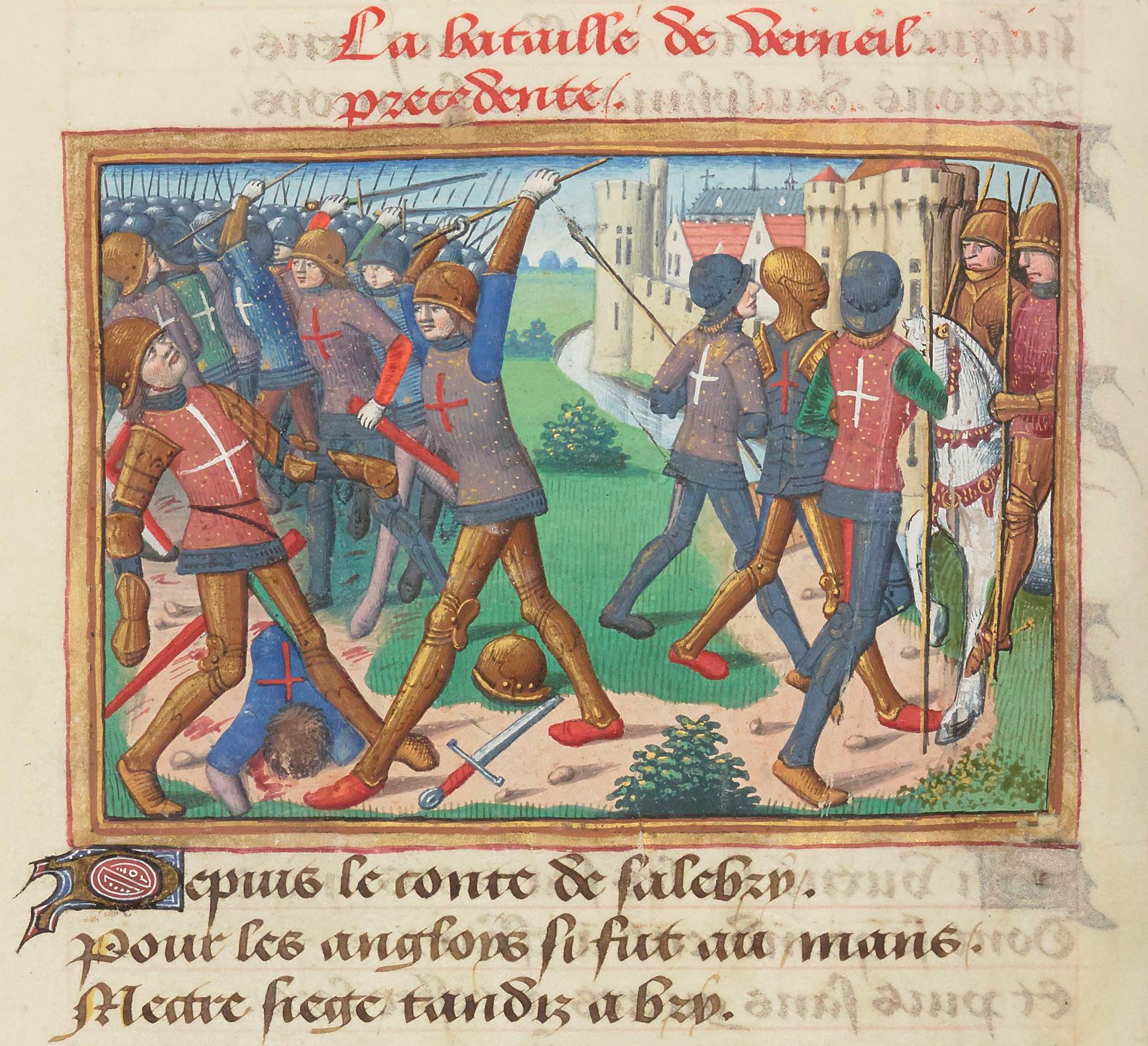
August 17: English armies overcome a larger French and Scottish force in defending Normandy in the Battle of Verneuil (illustration in the Vigiles du roi Charles VII)

Year 1424 (MCDXXIV) was a leap year starting on Saturday of the Julian calendar.

== Events ==
=== January–March ===
- January 23 – William Cheyne becomes the Lord Chief Justice of England and Wales, replacing the late William Hankford.
- February 1 – While negotiating his release from captivity, King James of Scotland is allowed to be married to Joan Beaufort in London, with a ceremony taking place at Southwark Cathedral.
- February 12 – The coronation of Sophia of Halshany, wife of Władysław II Jagiełło, as Queen consort of Poland takes place at the Kraków Cathedral.
- February 14 – Wars in Lombardy: The army of the Florentine Republic, led by Captain Pandolfo III Malatesta, storms the city of Romagna.
- March 28 – King James I of Scotland is released after having been held captive in England for 18 years. James is freed after putting his royal seal on a ransom treaty of £40,000, secured by Scottish hostages taking his place, as agreed at Durham, England.

=== April–June ===
- April 1 – China's Emperor Zhu Di, angry over the refusal of the Mongolian vassal Arughtai to pay tribute, departs from Beijing with an army of almost one million troops on a campaign in Inner Mongolia.
- April 5 – King James returns to Scotland for the first time since 1406, after being escorted to the border along with his wife Joan Beaufort, Queen consort, by English and Scottish nobles.
- May 21 – The coronation of James I as King of Scotland takes place at Scone Abbey in the Scottish town of Scone. After the ceremony King James performs his first knighthood ceremony, honoring 18 prominent nobles.
- June 2 – Battle of L'Aquila: Jacopo Caldora and Micheletto Attendolo, for the Kingdom of Naples, defeat Braccio da Montone, for Alfonso V of Aragon.
- June 22 – Mamluk Sultanate of Egypt under the leadership of Egyptian general Ibn bint al-Aqsarayi launch a series of military expeditions marking the start of the Mamluk campaigns against Cyprus (1424–1426).

=== July –September ===
- July 28 – The army of the Duchy of Milan, led by the Duke Filippo Maria Visconti, defeats the Republic of Florence's army, led by Carlo I Malatesta, in the Battle of Zagonara.
- August 12 – China's Yongle era Emperor, Zhu Di, dies at the age of 64 while leading an expedition of almost one million soldiers in an attempt to capture the Mongol leader Arughtai. The Emperor suffers a fatal stroke at Yumuchuan in what is now Inner Mongolia, while Arughtai has escaped.
- August 17 – Battle of Verneuil: An English force under John of Lancaster, Duke of Bedford, defeats a larger French army under John II, Duke of Alençon, John Stewart, and Archibald, Earl of Douglas. Alençon is captured and Douglas killed.
- September 7 – Prince Zhu Gaochi of China becomes the Hongxi Emperor (Emperor Renzong) of the Ming dynasty, beginning the Hongxi era, after the August 12 death of his father, the Emperor Zhu Di.
- September 13 – After the signing of a treaty between the different factions in the Hussite Wars, the Bohemian campaign is completed in the modern-day Czech Republic.
- September 23 – The Hussites, led by Jan Žižka, begin marching towards North Moravia to suppress the ongoing rebellion there.

=== October –December ===
- October 11 – Prokop the Great takes command of the Hussites after the death of Jan Žižka from the plague.
- November 1 – Zhu Zhanji is designated as the Crown Prince of Ming dynasty China by his father, the Hongxi Emperor. The Emperor dies eight months later and Zhu Zhanji becomes the Xuande Emperor on June 27, 1425.
- November – The Bourges astronomical clock, designed by Jean Fusoris, is installed in Bourges Cathedral as a gift to the town from Charles VII of France.
- December 10 – Radu II Chelul becomes the Prince of Wallachia (now in Romania) for the third time, taking over from Dan II after an Ottoman invasion.

=== Date unknown ===
- Dalmatia: Aliota Capenna, lord of Lesina (modern-day Hvar), offers his realm to the Republic of Venice (also said to have occurred in 1409 and 1421).

== Births ==
- January 1 – Louis IV, Elector Palatine (1436–1449) (d. 1449)
- June 9 – Blanche II of Navarre (d. 1464)
- August – Demetrios Chalkokondyles, Greek scholar (d. 1511)
- October 31 – King Władysław III of Poland (d. 1444)
- December 8 – Anselm Adornes, Merchant, politician and diplomat (d. 1483)
- December 25 – Margaret Stewart, Dauphine of France (d. 1445)
- August 10 or 1426 – Boniface III, Marquess of Montferrat (d. 1494)
- date unknown – Abu Sa'id Mirza, ruler of Persia and Afghanistan (d. 1469)
- date unknown – Mary of Looz-Heinsberg, Dutch noble woman (d. 1502)

== Deaths ==
- January 4 – Muzio Sforza, Italian condottiero
- January 8 – Stephen Zaccaria, Latin Archbishop of Patras
- April 14 – Lucia Visconti, English countess (b. 1372)
- May 10 – Emperor Go-Kameyama of Japan
- June 5 – Braccio da Montone, Italian condottiero
- June 10 – Ernest, Duke of Austria (b. 1377)
- June 16 – Johannes Ambundii, Archbishop of Riga
- August 12 – Emperor Cheng Zu of China (b. 1360)
- August 17 – John Stewart, Earl of Buchan (b. c. 1381)
- September 17 – Catherine, Princess of Asturias, Castilian royal (b. 1422)
- October 11 – Jan Žižka, Czech general and Hussite leader
- date unknown – Joan II of Auvergne (b. 1378)
- probable – Johannes Abezier, provost and bishop of the Teutonic Knights (b. 1380)
