= Rumaythah ibn Muhammad =

Rumaythah ibn Muḥammad ibn ‘Ajlān ibn Rumaythah ibn Abī Numayy al-Ḥasanī (Arabic: رميثة بن محمد بن عجلان بن رميثة بن أبي نمي الحسني) was Emir of Mecca and Vice Sultan in the Hejaz in 1416.

He surrendered Mecca to Hasan ibn Ajlan on the night of 26 Shawwal 819 AH (c. 16 December 1416).

Rumaythah ibn Muḥammad ibn ‘Ajlān ibn Rumaythah ibn Abī Numayy Banu Qatadah
Regnal titles
Preceded by Hasan ibn Ajlan; Barakat ibn Hasan; Ahmad ibn Hasan	Emir of Mecca; Feb 1416 – Dec 1416	Succeeded by Hasan ibn Ajlan
Preceded by Hasan ibn Ajlan	Vice Sultan in the Hejaz; Feb 1416 – Dec 1416	Vacant Title next held by Muhammad ibn Barakat
