= Muhammad ibn Ajlan =

Muḥammad ibn ‘Ajlān ibn Rumaythah ibn Abī Numayy al-Ḥasanī (Arabic: محمد بن عجلان بن رميثة بن أبي نمي الحسني) was Emir of Mecca from 1395 to 1396. He ruled during the reign of Sayf ad-Din Barquq.

Muhammad assumed the Emirate on Thursday, 8 Shawwal 797 AH (29 July 1395) following the death of his brother Ali ibn Ajlan. He remained in the post until the arrival of Hasan ibn Ajlan in late Rabi al-Thani 798 AH (February 1396).

== Notes ==
Muḥammad ibn ‘Ajlān ibn Rumaythah ibn Abī Numayy al-Ḥasanī Banu Qatadah
Regnal titles
Preceded by Ali ibn Ajlan	Emir of Mecca; 29 July 1395 – February 1396	Succeeded by Hasan ibn Ajlan
