= Madrasa Al-Bangaliyyah =

Islamic institutes in Hejaz patronised by Sultans of Bengal

The Bangaliyyah Madrasah (Arabic: المدرسة البنغالية, romanized: al-Madrasah al-Bangāliyyah), refers to the madrasas constructed in Hejaz during the 14th-15th century by the Sultans of Bengal. Part of a history of interactions between the Bengal Sultanate and Sharifate of Makkah, an account of these can be found in the Tarikh Makkah Sharif ("History of Makkah Sharif").

== History ==
=== Ghiyathiyyah madrasas ===
Sultan Ghiyathuddin Azam Shah founded two institutes in Makkah and Madinah during his reign in Bengal from 1390 to 1411. The Madrasah as-Sultaniyyah al-Ghiyathiyyah al-Banjaliyah (Arabic: المدرسة السلطانية الغياثية البنغالية) of Makkah was located near the gate of Umm Hani of Masjid al-Haram. Construction began in Ramadan 1411 CE and was completed in 1412 CE. It was the first madrasa in Makkah to teach all four madhhabs. The Hanafi and Shafiʽi school had twenty students each, while the Hanbali and Maliki schools had ten students each. The contemporary Arab scholar Taqi al-Din Muhammad ibn Ahmad al-Fasi worked in this madrasa as teacher of Maliki fiqh and other teachers, included Jamal ad-Din Qarshi, Shihab ad-Din Saghani, Muhy ad-Din Fasi, Abul Hasan al-Haskafi and the Shibi family.

The Ghiyathiyyah of Madinah Tayyibah was situated near Bab as-Salam in Al-Masjid an-Nabawi. The Sultan also commissioned money to buy property for establishing and to maintain both of these institutes. He sent a lot of money to repair the Arafat Stream. However, the Sharif of Makkah, Hasan ibn Ajlan, decided to use the money given by the Sultan for another project instead. The madrasas were said to be the best institutions in the region during this period.

=== Later madrasas ===
A later Bengali sultan, Jalaluddin Muhammad Shah, had good relations with Barakat ibn Hasan, the Sharif of Makkah, sent him presents and robes of honour. The Sultan gained permission from the Sharif to construct a madrasah in the city of Makkah. He is also said to have constructed a madrasah in Madinah between 1428 and 1431.

== See also ==
- Bangladesh–Saudi Arabia relations
- Khar Gerd
