= Ahmad ibn Hasan ibn Ajlan =

Ahmad ibn Hasan

Emir of Mecca
- Reign: Sep 1421 – c. 1 Feb 1416
- Predecessors: Hasan ibn Ajlan; Barakat ibn Hasan
- Successor: Rumaythah ibn Muhammad
- Co-Emirs: Hasan ibn Ajlan; Barakat ibn Hasan
- Born: Mecca, Hejaz
- Died: 1438; Zabid, Yemen
Names
- Aḥmad ibn Ḥasan ibn ‘Ajlān al-Ḥasanī; Arabic: أحمد بن حسن بن عجلان الحسني
Regnal name
- Shihāb al-Dīn; Arabic: شهاب الدين
- House: Banu Hasan; Banu Qatadah
- Father: Hasan ibn Ajlan

Shihāb al-Dīn Aḥmad ibn Ḥasan ibn ‘Ajlān al-Ḥasanī (Arabic: شهاب الدين أحمد بن حسن بن عجلان الحسني) was co-Emir of Mecca from 1408 to 1416 alongside his father Hasan ibn Ajlan and his brother Barakat ibn Hasan.

In Muharram 821 AH (February 1418) Sharif Hasan sent gifts to the Mamluk Sultan al-Nasir Faraj and requested the appointment of Ahmad as co-Emir of Mecca with his brother Barakat. Al-Nasir granted his request and issued a decree to that effect in mid-Rabi al-Awwal 821 AH (August 1408). The decree reached Mecca with robes of honor for the three sharifs in the second half of Rabi al-Thani (September 1408).

On 14 Safar 818 AH (c. 25 April 1415) Sultan al-Mu'ayyad Shaykh issued a decree deposing Hasan and his sons in favor of Rumaythah ibn Muhammad. The du'a and khutbah in Mecca continued in the name of Hasan and his sons until they departed for Yemen at the start of Dhu al-Hijjah (c. 1 February 1416).

Ahmad returned to Mecca with his father in Shawwal 819 AH (December 1416) after Hasan was reinstated as Emir. After Hasan passed control of the Emirate to Barakat in Rabi al-Awwal 821 AH (April/May 1418), Ahmad rebelled and left Mecca. He died in early 842 AH (1438) in Zabid, Yemen and was buried there.

== Notes ==
Aḥmad ibn Ḥasan ibn ‘Ajlān ibn Rumaythah ibn Abī Numayy Banu Qatadah
Regnal titles
Preceded by Hasan	Emir of Mecca; Sep 1421 – c. 1 Feb 1416 with Hasan; Barakat	Succeeded by Rumaythah ibn Muhammad
Preceded by Barakat	Emir of Mecca; Sep 1421 – c. 1 Feb 1416 with Hasan; Barakat	Succeeded by Rumaythah ibn Muhammad
