= Regency government, 1422–1437 =

Rule by English Regency Council on behalf of Henry VI

Regency of England
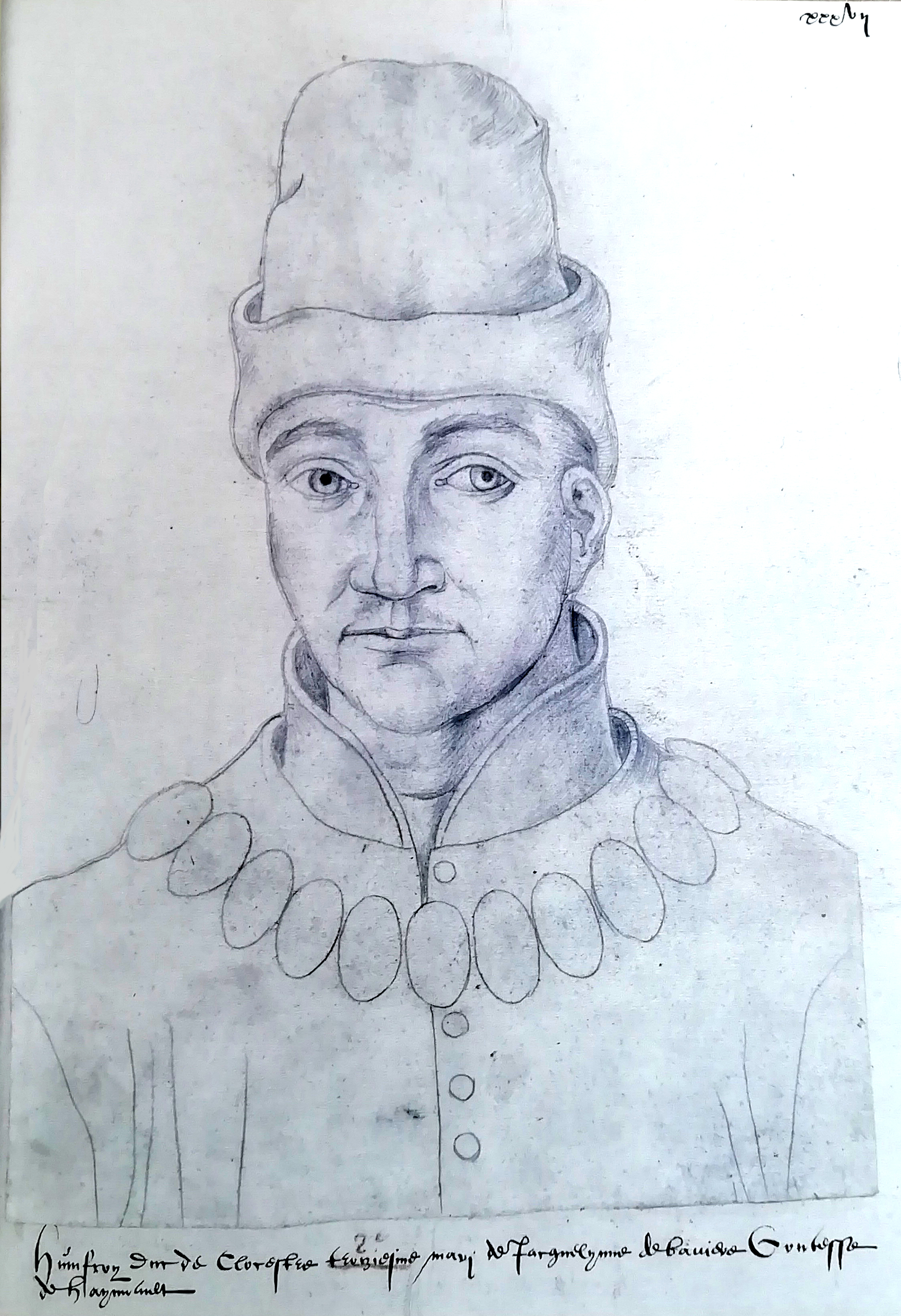
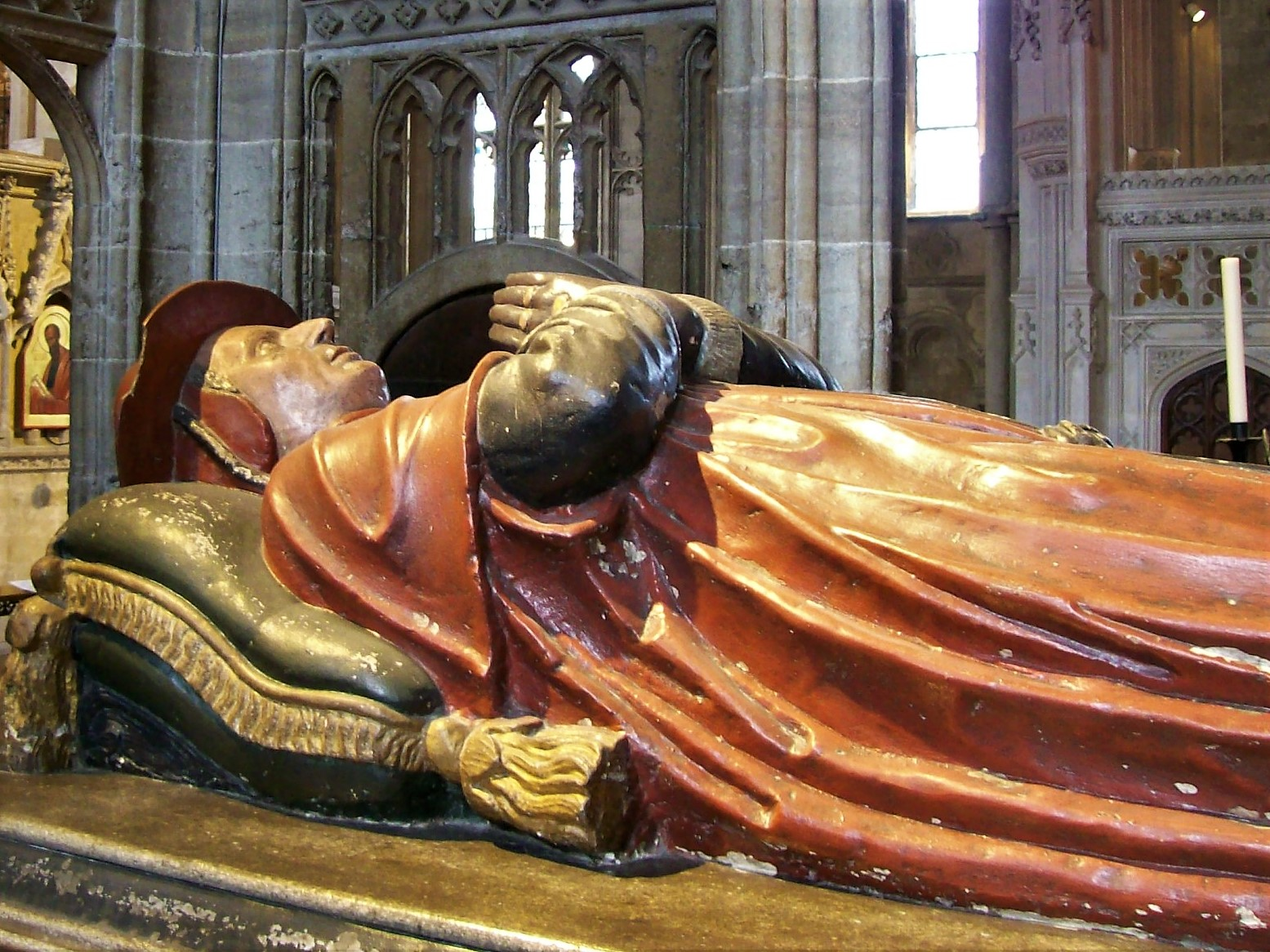
Humphrey, Duke of Gloucester (above) and Henry Beaufort (bottom)

The regency government of the Kingdom of England of 1422 to 1437 ruled while Henry VI was a minor. Decisions were made in the king's name by the regency council, which was made up of the most important and influential people in the government of England, and dominated by the king's uncle Humphrey, Duke of Gloucester (brother of the king's father and predecessor, Henry V), and Bishop (cardinal from 1426) Henry Beaufort (Gloucester's half-uncle).

The individuals who constituted the regency council as at 9 December 1422 were (Griffiths 1981, p. 23):

- John, Duke of Bedford
- Humphrey, Duke of Gloucester
- Thomas Beaufort, Duke of Exeter
- Henry Beaufort, Bishop of Winchester
- Henry Chichele, Archbishop of Canterbury
- John Kemp, Bishop of London
- Philip Morgan, Bishop of Worcester
- John Wakering, Bishop of Norwich
- Ralph Neville, 1st Earl of Westmorland
- Henry Percy, 2nd Earl of Northumberland
- John Mowbray, 2nd Duke of Norfolk
- Edmund Mortimer, 5th Earl of March
- Richard Beauchamp, 13th Earl of Warwick
- Henry FitzHugh, 3rd Baron FitzHugh
- Sir John Tiptoft
- Ralph Cromwell, 3rd Baron Cromwell
- Sir Walter Hungerford
- Sir Walter Beauchamp

Although the nominal leadership of the regency lay with John, Duke of Bedford (Gloucester's older brother), he spent most of his time ruling the English territories in France. Gloucester thus took the post of Lord Protector of the Realm in order to rule England while Bedford was absent. In practice, however, he was forced to share power with Cardinal Henry Beaufort, who held the position of Lord Chancellor and led a regency council composed of England's prominent magnates. Much of the period was marked by quarrels and disputes between Gloucester and the cardinal. Tensions between both parties could be seen in events such as the Parliament of Bats.

The council soon split along lines of opposition and support to the continuation of the war in France. Gloucester had always been fervently in favour of finishing the war his brother had started in France and seeing it through to victory at any price. However, in the face of a resurgent French army led by Joan of Arc and the crowning of the Dauphin as Charles VII in 1429, it became clear that the French were gaining the upper hand and slowly expelling the English from their country. A peace party emerged led by Cardinal Beaufort, who saw the war as a drain on resources and unwinnable.

However, for most of the period the regency council was able to govern effectively and fairly. The splits became most evident towards the end. In 1432, Anne of Burgundy died; she was the younger sister of Philip the Good, Duke of Burgundy. Anne had been the wife of John, Duke of Bedford, and their marriage was instrumental in maintaining the alliance between England and Burgundy against France. However, following her death, Bedford married Jacquetta of Luxembourg, which the Duke of Burgundy disapproved of and Burgundy made peace with France. With the loss of the alliance with Burgundy, Bedford became convinced that peace was the only solution, but at a conference arranged in Arras in 1435, the English delegation refused to give up their claim to the French throne. Bedford died just after the conference and was replaced with Richard, Duke of York, who did not favour the peace policy.

When Henry finally came of age in 1437, he took over at just about the worst time possible, when splits about the war and rivalries between the various nobles were at their deepest. The Crown had suffered huge war debts, and there was general lack of leadership in the French territories which seemed to be slipping slowly but surely out of English hands.

== See also ==
- Dual monarchy of England and France
- England in the Late Middle Ages
- Parliament of Bats
- Readeption of King Henry VI
- Regency era
