= Henry V =

Henry V may refer to:

== People ==
=== Kings ===
- Henry V, Holy Roman Emperor (1081/86–1125), also king of Germany, Italy and Burgundy
- Henry V of England (1386–1422)

=== Dukes ===
- Henry V, Duke of Bavaria (died 1026)
- Henry V, Duke of Carinthia (died 1161)
- Henry V, Duke of Legnica (c. 1248–1296)
- Henry V, Duke of Żagań (c. 1319–1369)
- Henry V, Duke of Mecklenburg (1479–1552)
- Henry V, Duke of Brunswick-Lüneburg (1489–1568)

=== Counts ===
- Henry V, Count Palatine of the Rhine (c. 1173–1227)
- Henry V, Count of Luxembourg (1216–1281)
- Henry V, Count of Gorizia (died 1362)
- Henri, Count of Chambord, pretender to the French throne as Henry V (1820–1883)

=== Others ===
- Henry V of Rosenberg (1456–1489)
- Henry V, Burgrave of Plauen (1533–1568)

== Media ==
- Henry V (play), a history play by Shakespeare named after the King of England
  - Henry V (1944 film), a film by Laurence Olivier
    - Suite from Henry V, William Walton's music from the Olivier film
  - Henry V (1989 film), a film by Kenneth Branagh
  - Henry V (2012 film), a film by Thea Sharrock
