= Ibrahim ibn Hasan ibn Ajlan =

Ibrahim ibn Hasan

Emir of Mecca
- Reign: 1421–1423
- Predecessors: Hasan ibn Ajlan; Barakat ibn Hasan
- Successors: Hasan ibn Ajlan; Barakat ibn Hasan
- Co-Emirs: Hasan ibn Ajlan; Barakat ibn Hasan
Names
- Ibrāhīm ibn Ḥasan ibn ‘Ajlān al-Ḥasanī; Arabic: إبراهيم بن حسن بن عجلان الحسني
Regnal name
- Sayf al-Dīn; Arabic: سيف الدين
- House: Banu Hasan; Banu Qatadah
- Father: Hasan ibn Ajlan

Sayf al-Dīn Ibrāhīm ibn Ḥasan ibn ‘Ajlān al-Ḥasanī (Arabic: سيف الدين إبراهيم بن حسن بن عجلان الحسني) was co-Emir of Mecca from 1421 to 1423 alongside his father Hasan ibn Ajlan and his brother Barakat ibn Hasan.

On 12 Rabi al-Awwal 824 AH (c. 17 March 1421) Sharif Hasan received a decree from the Sultan al-Muzaffar Ahmad that confirmed Hasan and Barakat as co-Emirs of Mecca, but did not grant Hasan's request to also appoint Ibrahim as co-Emir. Later that year Ibrahim entered Mecca with his supporters and unilaterally ordered the muezzin to insert his name in the dua alongside his father and brother. His name continued to be mentioned in the dua and khutbah until 826 AH (1423), when Hasan ordered for it to be removed.

== Notes ==
Ibrāhīm ibn Ḥasan ibn ‘Ajlān ibn Rumaythah ibn Abī Numayy Banu Qatadah
Regnal titles
Preceded by Hasan	Emir of Mecca; 1421–1423 with Hasan; Barakat	Succeeded by Hasan
Preceded by Barakat	Emir of Mecca; 1421–1423 with Hasan; Barakat	Succeeded by Barakat
