= Bourges astronomical clock =

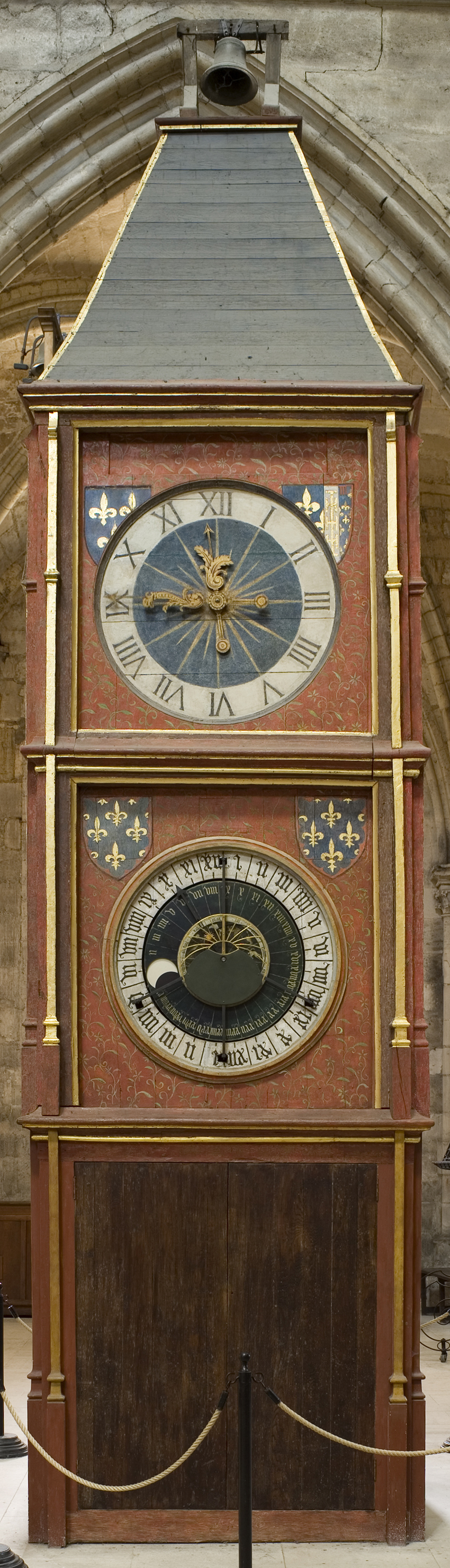

The Bourges astronomical clock is an astronomical clock in Bourges Cathedral in Bourges, France.

The clock was designed by Jean Fusoris and installed in November 1424. It was given by Charles VII (the "Little King of Bourges" – at this point of the Hundred Years' War, Charles VII ruled only a small area around his court at Bourges, with Henry VI of England recognised as King of England and France) to the townspeople of Bourges, on the occasion of the baptism of his son the Dauphin (the future Louis XI). It is the oldest extant astronomical clock in France.

== History ==
The clock was installed on the occasion of the baptism of the future Louis XI. It was designed by Jean Fusoris, mathematician and canon, and constructed by André Cassart, locksmith. The case was painted by Jean Grangier (or Jean of Orléans).

The clock was initially placed on the cathedral's rood screen, which was removed in 1757. It was then placed in a side aisle of the cathedral until the 19th century, then put into storage in the crypt.

== Description ==
Housed in a belfry-shaped case, the clock is the oldest surviving astronomical clock in France, and one of the oldest clocks after the 14th-century clock in Beauvais Cathedral. Its upper dial, installed in the 19th century, has two hands and shows the 12-hour time; the more complex lower dial shows the following:

- the 24-hour time of day, and the position of the Sun in the sky;
- the lunar cycle and phase;
- the time of year, as the position of the Sun in the zodiac.

All of these are read from the single arrow pointer: the hour on the outer ring numbered I to XII twice in black on white; the day of the lunar month on the ring numbered I to XXIX in gold on blue (with the lunar phase appearing in a circular aperture in this ring), and the annual position of the Sun on the inner ring showing the signs of the zodiac.

The bell on top of the case roof chimes the hour. The three bells to the side of the case at the base of the roof chime the quarter hours: A at the first quarter, AD at the half hour, AGD at the third quarter, and AGAD (the first four notes of the Salve Regina) on the hour.

The clock has been claimed to be very accurate, to within one second per 150 years; an impossibility in such an old clock.

== Restorations ==
The clock has undergone several rounds of restoration, in 1782, 1822, 1841, and in 1872, when the old mechanism was replaced by a simpler one in the upper part of the clock, which shows only the hours.

The zodiac calendar was restored in 1973. In 1986, a fire caused serious damage to the clock, leading to a thorough restoration project which aimed to return the clock to its original state.

In 1994, the clock was reinstated in the cathedral, after a complete restoration, with the mechanism of 1424 replaced by an exact copy. The original mechanism was conserved, and is on display in the cathedral. In the 1990s, a facsimile of the clock's main dial was made, and placed in the town's tourist office.

== Dimensions ==
- width of the case: 1.75 m
- depth of the case: 1.75 m
- height of the case: 6.20 m
- length of the mechanism: 1 m
- width of the mechanism: 0.85 m
- height of the mechanism: 1.20 m
