= Ali ibn Ajlan =

‘Alā’ al-Dīn Abu al-Ḥasan ‘Alī ibn ‘Ajlān ibn Rumaythah ibn Abī Numayy al-Ḥasanī (Arabic: علاء الدين أبو الحسن علي بن عجلان بن رميثة بن أبي نمي الحسني) was an Emir of Mecca.

He was killed on Wednesday, 7 Shawwal 797 AH (28 July 1395).
