= Parliament of Bats =

1426 parliament of England

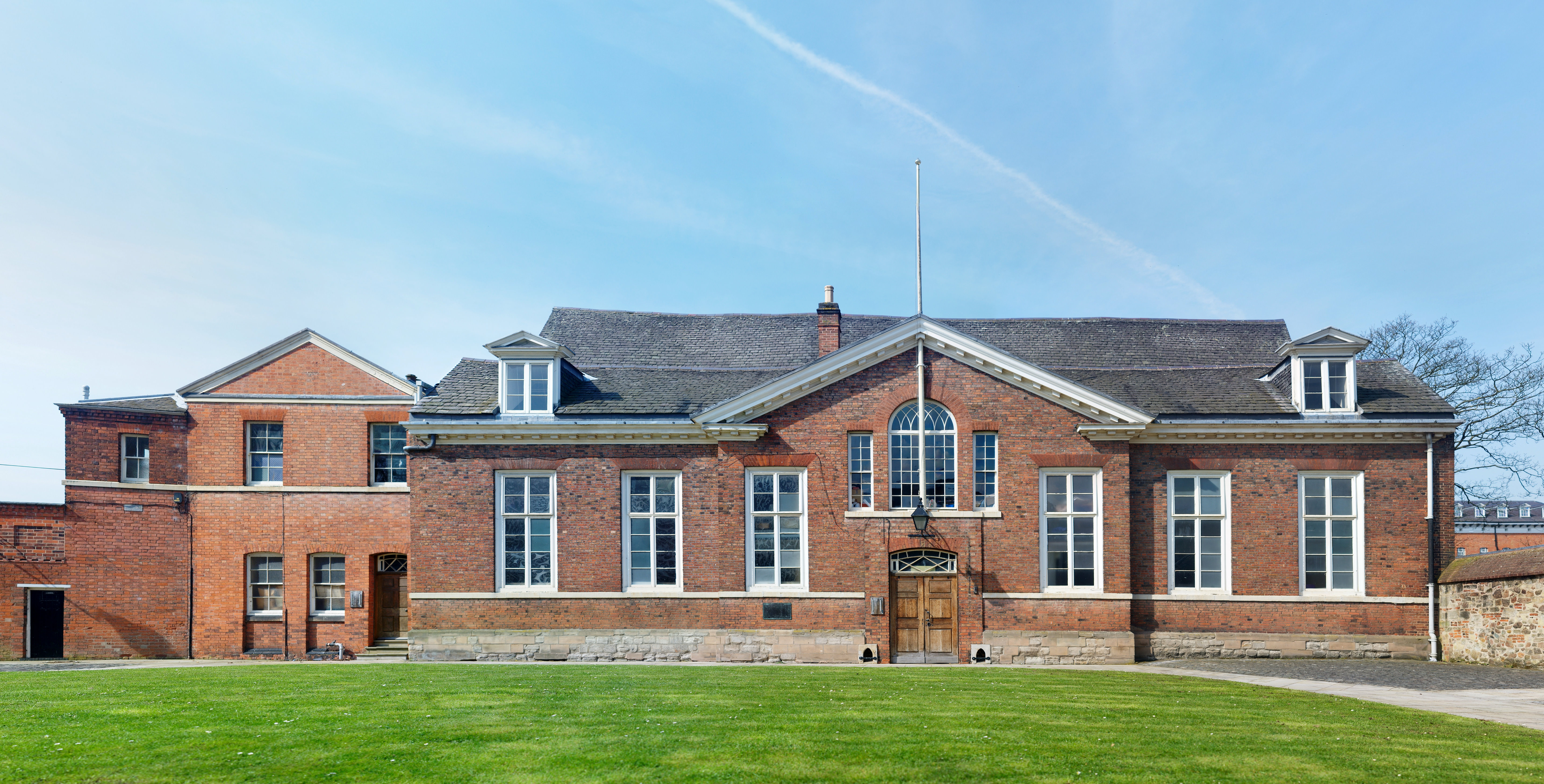
The Great Hall of Leicester Castle (now with an early modern facade), location of the parliament

The Parliament of Bats was a Parliament of England that was held in 1426 in Leicester. Meetings took place in the great hall of Leicester Castle. The king at the time, Henry VI, was an infant, and the session saw him knighted in St Mary de Castro Church across the road from the Castle Great Hall.

Tensions were high because of the ongoing dispute between Cardinal Beaufort, the Bishop of Winchester and off-and-on Lord Chancellor, and the Duke of Gloucester, the King's uncle and regent. Members and their attendants were therefore not allowed by the Duke of Gloucester to carry swords, and so armed themselves with bats, giving rise to the name "Parliament of Bats". This abuse of the rules led to bats also being prohibited at later parliaments. The parliament saw Beaufort removed permanently as Lord Chancellor and replaced with John Kemp.

== See also ==
- Regency government, 1422–1437
- English MPs 1426
