= Margareta (missionary) =

Swedish Sami missionary

Locations visited by Margareta in the south of Sweden

Margareta (c. 1369 – c. 1414) was a Swedish Sami missionary. Between about 1388 and 1414, she travelled around Sweden asking churches for support in spreading Christianity to the Sami people. In 1389, her campaign prompted a letter from the Swedish crown and the Archbishop of Lund in support of the mission. Her role is noted as unusual because of her position as a woman and a Sami.

== Biography ==
Margareta was born in Sami territory and is described as a poor woman with little education. By 1389, she was a committed Christian and had become attached to the diocese of Uppsala. The name Margareta, not a Sami name, was likely given to her after she became a Christian.

In the 1380s, Margareta began addressing churchmen, describing the spiritual state of the Sami people and urging church authorities to fulfil their responsibilities to them.

In April 1389, her campaign led her to Stockholm, where the monk Philippus Petri gave her a letter of recommendation. Petri praised her for her missionary work, comparing her to Saint Bridget, another woman calling for church reform who was being canonised at the time, and recommended that the Bishop of Uppsala should assist her. The Uppsala chapter received her ambivalently and sent her on with a letter seeking a second opinion on her. By July, she had made her way to Strängnäs.

On 19 July 1389, Bishop Tord Gunnarsson of Strängnäs instructed the monks at Vadstena Abbey to recommend Queen Margaret I of the Kalmar Union to order the Bishops of Uppsala and Åbo to send missionaries to the Sami upon her next expected visit to Vadstena.

On 6 August, Queen Margaret and Bishop of Lund Magnus Nielsen issued a letter to the Sami people, urging their conversion and baptism, and entrusting further mission work to the archbishop of Uppsala.

Margareta's work as a missionary was last mentioned on 17 March 1414, when she received another glowing recommendation from Abbot Sten of the Birgittine monastery Munkaliv in Bergen. Sten pointed out that, since the Sami people paid taxes, they were entitled to support in return, and expressed his admiration for Margareta's commitment to the cause.

== Other sources ==
- Ericsson, Ture, "Ur lappmissionens historia", ingår i Kristendomens väg till Sverige : läsebok i kyrkohistoria (Uppsala 1956)
- Lundgren, Gustaf B, Lappkvinnan Margareta, ingår i J. Nordlander, Norrlands äldsta sägner (Uppsala 1907)
- Månsson, Thure, artikel i Svenska Män och Kvinnor 5 (Sthlm 1949)
- Söderholm, Wolmar, Lappquinnan Margareta (Lycksele 1982)
- Svenskt biografiskt lexikon (art av Jan Liedgren), hämtad 2013-10-23.
