= Abu al-Qasim ibn Hasan ibn Ajlan =

Mu’ayyad al-Dīn Abu al-Qāsim ibn Ḥasan ibn ‘Ajlān al-Ḥasanī (Arabic: مؤيد الدين أبو القاسم بن حسن بن عجلان الحسني) was Emir of Mecca twice between 1443 and 1447.

He was appointed in place of his brother Ali in Shawwal 846 AH (February 1443). He reigned until Rabi al-Awwal 849 AH (June/July 1445) when he was deposed by his brother Barakat. In Dhu al-Hijjah (March 1446) Barakat left Mecca to avoid capture by the Egyptian emirs and Abu al-Qasim returned to the Emirate. On 17 Rabi al-Awwal 851 AH (c. 2 June 1447), Abu al-Qasim received word that the Sultan had returned the Emirate to Barakat. He promptly departed from Mecca and went to Wadi al-Abar. He then journeyed to Egypt, where he died in 853 AH (1449/1450).
