= Ali ibn Inan =

Emir of Mecca (1423-5)

‘Alā’ al-Dīn Abu al-Ḥasan ‘Alī ibn ‘Inān ibn Mughāmis ibn Rumaythah ibn Abī Numayy al-Ḥasanī (Arabic: علاء الدين أبو الحسن علي بن عنان بن مغامس بن رميثة بن أبي نمي الحسني) was Emir of Mecca from 1423 to 1425.
