= Barakat ibn Hasan =

15th century Emir of Mecca

Zayn al-Dīn Abū Zuhayr Barakāt ibn Ḥasan ibn ‘Ajlān al-Ḥasanī (Arabic: زين الدين أبو زهير بركات بن حسن بن عجلان الحسني) was a Sharif of Mecca from 1425 to 1455.

== Early life ==
Barakat was born in 801 AH (1398/1399) in al-Khushshafah near Jeddah. He was raised in Mecca by his father, the Emir of Mecca Hasan ibn Ajlan.

== As Co-Sharif of Mecca ==
On the request of Sharif Hasan ibn Ajlan, Sultan al-Nasir Faraj appointed Barakat as a co-Emir of Mecca in 809 AH (1407). In 811 AH the Sultan also appointed his brother Ahmad ibn Hasan as a co-Emir of Mecca and made their father Vice Sultan in the Hejaz.

In 818 AH (1416) the three Sharifs were deposed by Sultan al-Mu'ayyad Shaykh. In 819 AH Barakat met with the Sultan on his father's behalf and secured the latter's reappointment as Emir of Mecca. He himself returned to Mecca as co-Emir in 820 AH (1417). In Rabi al-Awwal 821 AH (April/May 1418) Hasan ordered his men to pledge allegiance to Barakat, indicating his intention to transfer power to his son. In 824 AH (1421) Barakat was opposed by his brother Ibrahim ibn Hasan when the latter was not appointed co-Emir of Mecca by Sultan al-Muzaffar Ahmad. Ibrahim unilaterally ordered the muezzin to include his name alongside the names of his father and brother. This continued until Hasan ordered for Ibrahim's name to be removed in 826 AH (1423).

In 827 AH (1424) Hasan and Barakat were deposed by Sultan al-Ashraf Barsbay, then reinstated in late 828 AH (1425). In Muharram 829 AH (November 1425) Hasan travelled to Egypt in response to summons from Barsbay and left Barakat in charge of Mecca. In Cairo, the Sultan received Hasan and confirmed him as Emir of Mecca, but only after he agreed to pay the sum of thirty thousand dinars. He was kept in Cairo until the first instalment of five thousand dinars was received. On the way back from Egypt Hasan fell ill; he returned to Cairo and died there on Thursday night, 17 Jumada al-Thani 829 AH (25 April 1426).

== As Sharif of Mecca ==
After Sharif Hasan's death Barakat and Ibrahim responded to summons from Barsbay and left their brother Abu al-Qasim in charge of Mecca. In Cairo the Sultan appointed Barakat as Emir of Mecca and ordered Ibrahim to swear an oath of loyalty to his brother. Barakat's appointment was conditional on his agreement to pay the remaining balance of Hasan's debt, amounting to twenty five thousand dinars. The Sultan also demanded an annual tribute of ten thousand dinars and the customary share owed to him from the customs duties (mukus) of Jeddah. He further stipulated that Indian ships would no longer be subject to duties at the Sharif's port in Jeddah, and would instead pay their dues at the Mamluk port in Suez. Barakat and Ibrahim left Cairo on 11 Shawwal 829 AH (c. 16 August 1426) and reached Mecca by 15 Dhu al-Qi'dah (17 September 1426).

During this time, Jalaluddin Muhammad Shah, the Sultan of Bengal, gifted Barakat with presents and robes of honour. With Barakat's permission, the Bengali Sultan constructed two Islamic institutions (known as Banjaliyah Madaris); the first in Makkah and the latter in Madinah which was built between 1428 and 1431. An account of these can be found in the Tarikh Makkah (History of Makkah).

== Notes ==
Barakat ibn Hasan House of Qatadah Born: 1398-99 Died: 4 August 1455
Regnal titles
Preceded by Hasan ibn Ajlan	Sharif of Mecca; 1425–1455	Succeeded by Muhammad ibn Barakat
