= 1370s =

Decade

The 1370s was a decade of the Julian Calendar which began on January 1, 1370, and ended on December 31, 1379.

== Events ==
=== 1370 ===
==== January–December ====
- February 18 – The Battle of Rudau is fought between the Teutonic Knights and the Grand Duchy of Lithuania near Rudau village, north of Königsberg (now Melnikovo village in the Kaliningrad oblast). According to the Teutonic chronicler Wigand of Marburg and the Livonian chronicle of Hermann de Wartberge, the Lithuanians suffer a great defeat.
- April 9 – Timur becomes first Amir of the Timurid Empire, following the Siege of Balkh which establishes his rule over the Chagatai Khanate, completing his conquest of Central Asia and parts of Persia.
- May 24 – The Treaty of Stralsund ends the war between Denmark and the Hanseatic League.
- September 19 – Hundred Years' War: Siege of Limoges – The English led by Edward the Black Prince retake the city from the French by storm with wide destruction, effectively ending the Limoges enamel industry.
- October 20 – Philip of Anjou, Titular Emperor of Constantinople, marries as his second wife Elizabeth of Slavonia (daughter of Stephen of Anjou and Margaret of Bavaria).
- November 5 – Casimir III the Great, king of Poland, dies as the result of a hunting accident, and is succeeded jointly by his sister, Elizabeth of Kujavia, and her son, Louis I of Hungary, beginning the rule of the country by the Capet-Anjou family.
- November 15 – Trần Nghệ Tông deposes Dương Nhật Lễ as emperor of Đại Việt, modern-day Vietnam.
- December 4 – Hundred Years' War: Battle of Pontvallain – A French army under Bertrand du Guesclin heavily defeats an English force in surprise attacks in northwest France.
- December 20 – Pope Gregory XI succeeds Pope Urban V, as the 201st pope.

==== Date unknown ====
- For the second time since 1368, the Grand Duchy of Moscow attacks Tver, which again counter-attacks, with the aid of the Grand Duchy of Lithuania and the Blue Horde.
- Khun Luang Pa-Ngua, ruler of Suphanburi, marches and usurps the throne of the Ayutthaya Kingdom.
- The city of Xi'an in Ming dynasty China is given a new defensive city wall.
- Hugues Aubriot begins construction of the fortress of the Bastille in Paris.
- The steel crossbow is first used as a weapon of war.

=== 1371 ===
==== January–December ====
- January – Edward, the Black Prince, gives up the administration of Aquitaine and returns to England, because of his poor health and heavy debts.
- February 17 – Rival brothers Ivan Sratsimir and Ivan Shishman become co-Emperors of Bulgaria after the death of their father, Ivan Alexander. Bulgaria is weakened by the split.
- February 22 – Robert II becomes the first Stuart king of Scotland, after the death of his uncle, David II.
- March 28 – The London Charterhouse, a Carthusian monastery, is founded in Aldersgate.
- April 9 – Emperor Go-En'yu of Japan succeeds Emperor Go-Kōgon of Japan, becoming the 5th and last Emperor of the Northern Court.
- August 22 – Battle of Baesweiler: Brabant is unexpectedly defeated by the Duchy of Jülich.
- September 21 – John of Gaunt, son of King Edward III of England, marries Constance of Castile, daughter of King Pedro of Castile, giving John a claim to the throne of Castile.
- September 26 – Battle of Maritsa: Most of the nobility in Serbia are killed by the Ottomans.
- December – Lazar succeeds his distant cousin, Stefan Uroš V, as ruler of Serbia, but declines the title of Tsar.

==== Date unknown ====
- The first widely accepted historical reference is made to playing cards (in Spain).
- Polish priest Andrzej Jastrzębiec becomes the first bishop of Siret, thus bringing Catholicism to Moldavia.
- Zhao Bing Fa becomes King of Mong Mao (in modern-day south China/north Myanmar) after the death of his father, Si Kefa.
- Kalamegha claims the vacant title of King of Cambodia after the power of the Thai invaders from Ayutthaya begins to weaken. The Ayutthayans are finally expelled in 1375.
- Byzantine co-emperor John V Palaiologos pledges loyalty to the Ottoman Empire, to prevent the Turks from invading Constantinople.
- The Hongwu Emperor of the Ming dynasty in China introduces the census registration system of lijia, or the hundreds-and-tithing system, throughout the Yangzi Valley. This system groups households into units of ten and groups of one hundred, whereupon their capacities for paying taxes and providing the state with corvée labor service can be assessed. The system becomes fully operational in 1381, when it counts 59,873,305 people living in China (the historian Timothy Brook asserts that the number was much higher, somewhere between 65 million and 75 million).

=== 1372 ===
==== January–December ====
- March 12 – Saint Bridget sets out on a pilgrimage to the Holy Land, staying in Cyprus until May 12. In August, she is in Bethlehem where she sees a vision of Jesus' birth. In September, she sets sail for Naples, where she arrives in December.
- May – Owain Lawgoch makes a second attempt to take the throne of Wales, sailing with French support from Harfleur. Whilst attacking the island of Guernsey, he abandons the invasion in order to fight for France at La Rochelle.
- June 22 – Battle of La Rochelle: The French and the Castilians defeat the English. The French gain control of the English Channel for the first time since 1340.
- July 10 – The Treaty of Tagilde is signed between Ferdinand I of Portugal and representatives of John of Gaunt of England, marking the beginning of the Anglo-Portuguese Alliance, which remains in effect into the 21st century.
- November 9 – Trần Duệ Tông succeeds his brother Trần Nghệ Tông as King of Vietnam.

==== Date unknown ====
- Encounter of Sintra: Twenty Portuguese knights rout four hundred Castilian infantrymen of the country.
- Peace is declared between the Kingdom of Sicily and the Kingdom of Naples.
- The Kingdom of Chūzan (in modern-day southern Japan) enters tributary relations with Ming dynasty China.
- Four-year-old Muhammad as-Said succeeds his father, Abu l-Fariz Abdul Aziz I, as Marinid Sultan of Morocco.
- Newaya Maryam succeeds his father, Newaya Krestos, as ruler of Ethiopia.
- The city of Aachen, Germany, begins adding a Roman numeral Anno Domini date to a few of its coins, the first city in the world to do so.

=== 1373 ===
==== January–December ====
- March 24 – The Treaty of Santarém is signed between Ferdinand I of Portugal and Henry II of Castile, ending the second war between the two countries.
- April 28 – Hundred Years' War: The French re-capture most of Brittany from the English, but are unable to take Brest.
- May 13 – English anchoress Dame Julian of Norwich receives the sixteen Revelations of Divine Love.
- June 16 – The Anglo-Portuguese Treaty is signed in London, and is the oldest active treaty in the world.
- August – Hundred Years' War: John of Gaunt launches a new invasion of France.
- November? – Philip II, Prince of Taranto hands over the rule of Achaea (modern-day southern Greece) to his cousin, Joanna I of Naples.

==== Date unknown ====
- Louis I of Hungary takes Severin again, but the Vlachs will recover it in 1376–1377.
- Byzantine co-emperor Andronikos IV Palaiologos rebels against his father, John V Palaiologos, for agreeing to let Constantinople become a vassal of the Ottoman Empire. After the rebellion fails, Ottoman Emperor Murad I commands John V Palaiologos to blind his son.
- Constantine IV, ruler of the Armenian Kingdom of Cilicia (modern-day southern Turkey), is assassinated; he is succeeded by his distant cousin Leo V.
- The death of Sultan Muhammad III ibn Abd al-Aziz begins a period of political instability in Morocco.
- The city of Phnom Penh (modern-day capital city of Cambodia) is founded.
- Bristol is made a county corporate, the first town in the Kingdom of England outside London to be granted this status.
- A city wall is built around Lisbon, Portugal to resist invasion by Castile.
- Merton College Library is built in Oxford, England.
- The Adina Mosque is built in Bengal.
- The Chinese emperor of the Ming dynasty, the Hongwu Emperor, suspends the traditional civil service examination system after complaining that the 120 new jinshi degree-holders are too incompetent to hold office; he instead relies solely upon a system of recommendations, until the civil service exams are reinstated in 1384.

=== 1374 ===
==== January–December ====
- April 23 – In recognition of his services, Edward III of England grants the English writer Geoffrey Chaucer a gallon of wine a day, for the rest of his life.
- June 24 – The illness dancing mania begins in Aix-la-Chapelle (Aachen), possibly due to ergotism.
- October 27 – King Gongmin of Goryeo is assassinated and succeeded by U of Goryeo on the throne of Goryeo (in modern-day Korea).
- November 25 – James of Baux succeeds his uncle, Philip II, as Prince of Taranto (modern-day eastern Italy) and titular ruler of the Latin Empire (northern Greece and western Turkey).

==== Date unknown ====
- Rao Biram Dev succeeds Rao Kanhadev as ruler of Marwar (the modern-day Jodhpur district of India).
- Shaikh Hasan Jalayir succeeds his father, Shaykh Uways Jalayir, as ruler of the Jalayirid Sultanate in modern-day Iraq and western Iran. Hasan proves to be an unpopular ruler and is executed on October 9 and succeeded by his brother, Shaikh Hussain Jalayir.
- Musa II succeeds his father, Mari Djata II, as Mansa of the Mali Empire (modern-day Mali and Senegal).
- Robert de Juilly succeeds Raymond Berenger as Grand Master of the Knights Hospitaller.
- Princes from the Kingdom of Granada choose Abu al-Abbas Ahmad to succeed Muhammad as-Said, as Sultan of the Marinid Empire in Morocco. The Empire is split into the Kingdom of Fez and the Kingdom of Marrakesh.
- A form of the Great Plague returns to Europe.
- The Château de Compiègne royal residence is built in France.

=== 1375 ===
==== January–December ====
- April 14 – The Mamluks from Egypt complete their conquest of the Armenian Kingdom of Cilicia. Levon V Lusignan of Armenia is imprisoned for several years in Cairo, until a ransom is paid by King John I of Castile.
- April 21 – Mujahid Shah succeeds his father, Mohammed Shah I, as ruler of the Bahmani Sultanate in the Deccan Plateau of southern India.
- June 18 – The future King John I of Castile marries Eleanor of Aragon.
- June 27 – Hundred Years' War: The English, weakened by the plague, lose so much ground to the French that they agree to sign the Treaty of Bruges, leaving them with only the coastal towns of Calais, Bordeaux and Bayonne.
- October 24 – Margaret I of Denmark becomes Regent of Denmark after the death of her father, Valdemar IV.

==== Date unknown ====
- The Grand Duchy of Moscow and Tver sign a truce. Tver agrees to help Moscow fight the Blue Horde.
- Presumed death of Tenoch, ruler of the Mexica; he is succeeded by Acamapichtli who becomes first tlatoani (ruler) of the Aztecs of Tenochtitlan and founder of the Aztec imperial dynasty.
- Petru succeeds as Voivode (ruler) of Moldavia (modern-day Moldova & eastern Romania). He is the first ruler from the dynastic House of Bogdan.
- Coluccio Salutati is appointed Chancellor of Florence.
- The Russian town of Kostroma is destroyed by the ushkuynik pirates from Novgorod.
- Heirin-ji Temple is founded near Tokyo.
- In Nanjing, capital of Ming dynasty China, a bureau secretary of the Ministry of Justice, Ru Taisu, sends a 17,000 character-long memorial to the throne, to be read aloud to the Hongwu Emperor. By the 16,370th character, the emperor has been offended by several passages, and has Ru Taisu summoned to court and flogged for the perceived insult. The next day, having had the remaining characters read to him, he likes four of Ru's recommendations, and instates these in reforms. Ru is nevertheless castigated for having forced the emperor to hear thousands of characters before getting to the part with true substance. The last 500 characters are elevated in court as the model-type memorial that all officials should aspire to create while writing their own.
- Approximate date – Battle of Gardiki: The Principality of Achaea defeats the Despotate of the Morea.

=== 1376 ===
- March – The peace treaty between England and France is extended until April, 1377.
- March 31 – Pope Gregory XI excommunicates all members of the government of Florence, and places the city under an interdict.
- April 28 – The Good Parliament begins in England (so called because its members attempt to reform the corrupt Royal Council).
- May 3 – Olav IV Haakonsson is elected King Oluf II of Denmark, following the death of his grandfather, Valdemar IV, in 1375.
- June – Catherine of Siena visits Pope Gregory XI in Avignon, to attempt to persuade him to make peace with Florence, and move the Papacy back to Rome.
- June 7 – The dying Prince Edward summons his father, Edward III, and brother, John of Gaunt, and makes them swear to uphold the claim to the throne of his son Richard; Edward is the first "English" Prince of Wales not to become King of England.
- July 10 – The Good Parliament is dissolved (at this time, it is the longest Parliament to have sat in England).
- August 12 – With the help of the Genoese, Byzantine co-emperor Andronicus IV Palaeologus invades Constantinople and dethrones his father, John V Palaeologus, as co-emperor. John V Palaeologus is taken prisoner.
- September – John of Gaunt summons religious reformer John Wyclif to appear before the Royal Council.
- November 20 – Richard of Bordeaux, son of the Black Prince, is created Prince of Wales in succession to his father.
- December 25 – John of Gaunt presents his nephew, Richard of Bordeaux, to the feudatories of the realm and swears to uphold Richard's right to succeed Edward III.
- Unknown date – Acamapichtli becomes the first tlatoani of Tenochtitlan.

=== 1377 ===
==== January–December ====
- January – Battle of Đồ Bàn: Trần Duệ Tông, Trần dynasty Emperor of Đại Việt (Vietnam), is killed.
- January 17 – Pope Gregory XI moves the Papacy back from Avignon to Rome.
- January 27 – The Bad Parliament begins sitting in England. Influenced by John of Gaunt, 1st Duke of Lancaster, it undoes the work done by the Good Parliament, the previous year, to reduce corruption in the Royal Council. It also introduces a poll tax.
- February – The Pope's representative in northern Italy, Robert of Geneva (the future antipope Clement VII), pillages Cesena, and 4,000 antipapal rebels are massacred.
- March 2 – The Bad Parliament dissolves; the first Speaker of the House of Commons of England is appointed.
- March 13 – Trần Phế Đế succeeds his late father as ruler of Vietnam.
- May
  - Continuous riots in Rome induce Pope Gregory XI to move temporarily back to Avignon.
  - Władysław II Jagiełło succeeds his father, Algirdas, as Grand Duke of Lithuania. Jagiello removes his uncle, Kęstutis, as co-ruler.
- May 22 – Pope Gregory XI issues five Bulls condemning the opinion of John Wycliffe, that Catholic priests should live in poverty, like the twelve disciples of Jesus.
- July 16 – Richard II, the 10-year-old grandson of Edward III, is crowned king of England. A minority government is established, and a series of continual councils rule on his behalf until 1381.
- July 27 – Fourteen-year-old Maria of Sicily succeeds her father, Frederick the Simple.
- August – The Hongwu Emperor of the Ming dynasty of China scraps the Office of Reports Inspection (established in 1370) for a new Office of Transmission, in his efforts to create a more efficient communicatory system in the empire. A month before this he noted that anyone could send memorials to the throne; commoners often did, although the only times their petitions were read aloud to the emperor were when they called for the impeachment of local officials who were not up to par with their official duties.
- August 2 – Battle on Pyana River: The Russians are defeated, while their commander drowns in the river.
- October 13 – Richard II of England's first parliament meets.
- October 26 – Tvrtko I of Bosnia is crowned.

==== Date unknown ====
- Sayf ad-Din Barquq leads a revolt against the Mamluk Sultan of Egypt, Alah-ad-Din Ali.
- A rebellion against the Majapahit Empire is quashed in Sumatra.
- Informed that Khan Urus of the White Horde has died, Timur of the Timurid Empire sends Tokhtamysh to take the Horde throne, but is defeated by Urus' son, Timur Malik.
- Radu I succeeds Vladislav I as Prince of Wallachia (modern-day southern Romania).
- Harihara II succeeds Bukka Raya I, as ruler of the Vijayanagara Empire (in modern-day southern India).
- King U of Goryeo adopts the Ming calendar and begs to be invested by the Hongwu Emperor.
- The Trezzo sull'Adda Bridge is completed in Lombardy, and becomes the longest single-arch bridge in the world to be built for four centuries.
- A sermon by a German monk states "the game of cards has come to us this year", and prohibitions against cards are issued by Prince John of Castile, and the cities of Florence and Basel.

=== 1378 ===
==== January–December ====
- January – Charles IV, Holy Roman Emperor, visits his nephew Charles V of France in Paris, to celebrate publicly the friendship between their two nations.
- January 13 – Balša II succeeds his brother, Durađ I, as ruler of Lower Zeta (modern-day Montenegro).
- March – In England, John Wycliffe tries to promote his ideas for Catholic reform by laying his theses before Parliament, and making them public in a tract. He is subsequently summoned before the Archbishop of Canterbury, Simon of Sudbury, at the episcopal palace at Lambeth, to defend his actions.
- April 9 – Following the death of Pope Gregory XI, and riots in Rome calling for a Roman pope, the cardinals, who are mostly French, elect Pope Urban VI (Bartolomeo Prignano, Archbishop of Bari) as the 202nd Pope.
- April 16 – Da'ud Shah succeeds his assassinated nephew, Aladdin Mujahid Shah, as ruler of the Bahmani Sultanate in modern-day southern India. Da'ud Shah is assassinated in the following month, and is succeeded by Mohammad Shah II.
- May – Uskhal Khan Tögüs Temür succeeds his father, Biligtü Khan Ayushiridara, as ruler of the Northern Yuan dynasty in Mongolia.
- July 21 – Ciompi Revolt: Discontented wool carders briefly take over the government of Florence.
- August 4 – Gian Galeazzo Visconti succeeds his father, Galeazzo II Visconti, as ruler of Milan.
- August 11 – Battle of the Vozha River: Prince Dmitri Ivanovich of Moscow resists a small invasion by the Mongol Blue Horde under Mamai.
- September – A contract is set up between Richard le Scrope, 1st Baron Scrope of Bolton and the mason Johan Lewyn, for the construction of Bolton Castle in the north of England.
- September 20 – Unhappy with Pope Urban's critical attitude towards them, the majority of the cardinals meet at Fondi, elect Clement VII as antipope, and establish a rival papal court at Avignon. This split within the Catholic Church becomes known as the Western Schism, also known as the Great Schism. France, Aragon, Castile and León, Cyprus, Burgundy, Savoy, Naples and Scotland choose to recognise Antipope Clement VII. Denmark, England, Flanders, the Holy Roman Empire, Hungary, northern Italy, Ireland, Norway, Poland and Sweden continue to recognise Pope Urban VI.
- November 10 – Estimated appearance date of Halley's Comet.
- November 29 – Charles IV, Holy Roman Emperor, dies in Prague. He is succeeded by his son, Wenceslaus, as King of Bohemia, but the office of Holy Roman Emperor falls into abeyance, until Charles's son Sigismund is crowned in 1433.

==== Date unknown ====
- The Raseborg Castle is mentioned for the first time in documents, but its actual date of foundation is unknown.
- Tokhtamysh dethrones Temur-Malik to become Khan of the White Horde.
- Uthman Beg establishes the Aq Qoyunlu (Turkomans of the White Sheep) dynasty at Diyarbakır, in modern-day southeast Turkey.
- Ottoman Turks capture the town of Ihtiman in west Bulgaria.
- Tai Bian succeeds Zhao Bing Fa as King of Mong Mao (modern-day northern Myanmar).
- Sa'im al-Dahr is hanged for blowing the nose off the Great Sphinx of Giza.

=== 1379 ===
==== January–December ====
- May 29 – John I succeeds his father, Henry II, as King of Castile and King of León.
- June 30 – New College, Oxford, is founded in England by William of Wykeham, Bishop of Winchester.
- July 1 – Forces of the Republic of Venice and Ottoman Turks, having invaded Constantinople, restore John V Palaiologos as Byzantine co-emperor. Andronikos IV Palaiologos is allowed to remain as co-emperor, but is confined to the city of Silivri for the remainder of his life.
- September 9 – The Treaty of Neuberg is signed, splitting the Austrian Habsburg lands between brothers Albert III and Leopold III. Albert III retains the title of Duke of Austria.

==== Date unknown ====
- Bairam Khawaja establishes the independent principality of the Kara Koyunlu (Turkomans of the Black Sheep Empire), in modern-day Armenia.
- Dmitry Donskoy of Moscow raids Estonia.
- In the Hundred Years' War, the French lose control of most of Brittany to the English.
- Wisbech Grammar School is founded in England.
- Timur conquers the Sufid Dynasty of Khwarazm.

== Births ==
1370

- April 11 – Frederick I, Elector of Saxony (d. 1428)
- July 23 – Pier Paolo Vergerio the Elder, Italian humanist (d. 1444 or 1445)
- date unknown
  - Erasmo of Narni, Italian mercenary (d. 1443)
  - Guarino da Verona, Italian humanist (d. 1460)
  - John VII Palaiologos, Byzantine Emperor (d. 1408)
  - King Olav IV of Norway (d. 1387)
  - Jan Piast, Duke of Ziebice (d. 1428)
  - Jan Sindel, Polish scientist (d. 1443)
- probable
  - Joan of Navarre, Queen of England, Duchess regent of Brittany (d. 1437)
  - John Lydgate, English Benedictine monk and poet (d. 1451)
  - Paulus Vladimiri, Polish scholar (d. 1435)
  - Duke William of Austria (d. 1406)

1371

- May 28 – John the Fearless (d. 1419)
- September 21 – Frederick I, Elector of Brandenburg (d. 1440)
- December 30 – Prince Vasily I of Moscow (d. 1425)
- date unknown
  - Leopold IV, Duke of Austria (d. 1411)
  - Sophia of Lithuania, regent of Lithuania (d. 1453)
  - Zheng He, Chinese mariner and explorer (d. 1433)
- probable – Isabeau de Bavière, queen of Charles VI of France (d. 1435)

1372

- February 18 – Ibn Hajar al-Asqalani, Islamic scholar (d. 1449)
- March 13 – Louis of Valois, Duke of Orléans, son of King Charles V of France (d. 1407)
- September 8 – Thomas Holland, 1st Duke of Surrey (d. 1400)
- October – John Hastings, 3rd Earl of Pembroke (d. 1389)
- approximate date
  - Helena Dragaš, empress consort of Byzantium (d. 1450)
  - Olivera, daughter of Lazar of Serbia and wife of Bayezid I

1373

- March 29 – Marie d'Alençon, French princess (d. 1417)
- June 25 – Queen Joanna II of Naples (d. 1435)
- September 22 – Thomas le Despenser, 1st Earl of Gloucester (d. 1400)
- date unknown
  - Edward of Norwich, 2nd Duke of York (d. 1415)
  - Margery Kempe, writer of the first autobiography in English

1374

- April 11 – Roger Mortimer, 4th Earl of March, heir to the throne of England (d. 1398)
- November 26 – Yury Dmitrievich, Russian grand prince (d. 1434)
- probable
  - Queen Jadwiga of Poland
  - King Martin I of Sicily (d. 1409)

1375

- October – Joanna of Aragon, Countess of Foix, Aragonese throne claimant (d. 1407)
- date unknown
  - Richard of Conisburgh, 3rd Earl of Cambridge (approximate date; d. 1415)
  - Nicolas Grenon, French composer (approximate date; d. 1456)
  - Lan Kham Deng, King of Lan Xang 1416–1428 (d. 1428)
  - Johannes Abezier (1375–1424), Roman Catholic religious and political leader of the Teutonic Knights, over Polish territory

1376

- November 9 – Edmund Mortimer, English nobleman and rebel (d. c. 1409)
- date unknown
  - Gihwa, scholar in Korean Buddhism (d. 1433)
  - Sofia of Bavaria, queen consort of Bohemia (d. 1425)
  - Yusuf III, Sultan of Granada (d. 1417)

1377

- February 15 – King Ladislaus of Naples (d. 1414)
- August 1 – Emperor Go-Komatsu of Japan (d. 1433)
- August 20 – Shahrukh Mirza, ruler of Persia and Transoxiania (d. 1447)
- September 19 – Albert IV, Duke of Austria (d. 1404)
- December 5 – Jianwen Emperor of China (d. 1402)
- date unknown
  - Louis II of Anjou (d. 1417)
  - Filippo Brunelleschi, Italian architect (d. 1446)
  - Anglesia Visconti, queen consort of Cyprus (d. 1439)
  - Ernest, Duke of Austria (d. 1424)
  - Oswald von Wolkenstein, Austrian poet (d. 1445)
  - Stefan Lazarević, Despot of Serbia (d. 1427)
  - Đurađ Branković, Despot of Serbia (d. 1456)
  - Guru Ravidas, (d. 1528)

1378

- January 23 – Louis III, Elector Palatine (d. 1436)
- May 27 – Zhu Quan, Chinese military commander, historian and playwright (d. 1448)
- August 16 – Hongxi Emperor of China (d. 1425)
- October 24 – David Stewart, Duke of Rothesay, heir to throne of Scotland (d. 1402)
- December 31 – Pope Callixtus III (d. 1458)
- date unknown
  - Vittorino da Feltre, Italian humanist (d. 1446)
  - Joan II, Countess of Auvergne, French vassal (d. 1424)
  - Lorenzo Ghiberti, Italian sculptor and metal-worker (d. 1455)
  - John Hardyng, English chronicler (d. 1465)
  - Narasimha Saraswati - Indian Guru and Saint

1379

- October 4 – King Henry III of Castile (d. 1406)
- date unknown
  - Jerome of Prague, Hussite (d. 1416)
  - Empress Zhang (Hongxi) of China (d. 1442)

== Deaths ==
1370

- May 31 – St. Vitalis of Assisi, Italian hermit (b. 1295)
- c. September 20 – Edward of Angoulême, French-born royal prince of England (b. 1365)
- November 5 – Casimir III the Great, King of Poland (b. 1310)
- December 19 – Pope Urban V (b. 1310)
- date unknown
  - Simeon Uroš, Emperor of Serbs and Greeks and half-brother of Stefan Dušan (b. 1326)
  - Vedanta Desika, Indian Hindu guru and poet (b. 1269)
  - Yang Weizhen, Chinese painter (b. c. 1296)
  - Toghon Temür, Emperor Huizong of Yuan dynasty China (b. 1320)
- probable date – Empress Gi of Yuan dynasty China (b. 1315)

1371

- January/February – Paul, Latin Patriarch of Constantinople
- February 17 – Ivan Alexander of Bulgaria
- February 22 – David II of Scotland (b. 1324)
- March 4 – Jeanne d'Évreux, queen consort of France (b. 1310)
- September – Thomas de Vere, 8th Earl of Oxford (b. c. 1336)
- September 26 – Jovan Uglješa, Serbian despot
- September 26 – Vukašin Mrnjavčević, Serbian king

1372

- January 11 – Eleanor of Lancaster, English noblewoman (b. 1318)
- March 19 – John II, Marquess of Montferrat (b. 1321)
- March 21 – Rudolf VI, Margrave of Baden
- August 24 – Casimir III, Duke of Pomerania (b. 1348)
- August 31 – Ralph de Stafford, 1st Earl of Stafford, English soldier (b. 1301)
- date unknown – Bagrat I of Imereti, King of Georgia
- date unknown – Newaya Krestos, Emperor of Ethiopia

1373

- January 16 – Humphrey de Bohun, 7th Earl of Hereford (b. 1342)
- February – Ibn Kathir, Mamluk Islamic scholar (b. 1301)
- July 23 – Saint Birgitta, Swedish saint (b. 1303)
- November 3 – Jeanne de Valois, Queen of Navarre (b. 1343)
- December 7 – Rafał of Tarnów, Polish nobleman (b. c. 1330)
- date unknown
  - Constantine IV, King of Armenia (assassinated)
  - Robert le Coq, French bishop and councillor
  - Tiphaine Raguenel, Breton astrologer (b. c. 1335)

1374

- March 12 – Emperor Go-Kōgon of Japan (b. 1338).
- June 5 or June 6 – William Whittlesey, Archbishop of Canterbury
- June 29 – Jan Milíč of Kroměříž, Czech priest and reformer
- July 19 – Petrarch, Italian poet (b. 1304)
- September – Joanna of Flanders, Duchess of Brittany (b. 1295)
- October 27 – King Gongmin of Goryeo (b. 1330)
- November 25 – Prince Philip II of Taranto
- December 1 – Magnus Eriksson, king of Sweden (b. 1316)
- date unknown – Gao Qi, Chinese poet (born 1336)
- date unknown – Konrad of Megenberg, historian (b. 1309)

1375

- April 21 – Elisabeth of Meissen, Burgravine consort of Nuremberg (b. 1329)
- October 19 – Cansignorio della Scala, Lord of Verona (b. 1340)
- April 16 – John Hastings, 2nd Earl of Pembroke, English nobleman and soldier (b. 1347)
- May 16 – Liu Bowen, Chinese military strategist, officer, statesman and poet (b. 1311)
- July 5 – Charles III of Alençon, French archbishop (b. 1337)
- September 1 – Philip of Valois, Duke of Orléans (b. 1336)
- October 24 – King Valdemar IV of Denmark
- November 12 – John Henry, Margrave of Moravia (b. 1322)
- December 21 – Giovanni Boccaccio, Italian writer (b. 1313)
- date unknown
  - Adityawarman, king of Malayapura
  - Margaret Drummond, dowager queen consort of Scotland (b. c.1340)
  - Lațcu, voivode of Moldavia
  - Tenoch, Mexica ruler

1376

- January 24 – Richard FitzAlan, 10th Earl of Arundel, English military leader
- April 6 – Przecław of Pogorzela, Cardinal and Bishop of Wrocław (b. 1310)
- May 30 – Joan of Ponthieu, Dame of Epernon, French countess regent
- June 8 – Edward, the Black Prince, son of King Edward III of England (b. 1330)
- July 22 – Simon Langham, Archbishop of Canterbury (b. 1310)
- September 30 – Adelaide of Vianden, German countess

1377

- January 27 – Frederick the Simple, King of Sicily (b. 1341)
- March 16 or March 17 – Marie de St Pol, Countess of Pembroke and Foundress of Pembroke College, Cambridge (b. c.1303)
- April – Guillaume de Machaut, French poet and composer (b. c. 1300)
- April 23 or July 11 – Richardis of Schwerin, queen consort of Sweden (b. 1347)
- May – Algirdas, Grand Prince of Lithuania
- June 21 – King Edward III of England (b. 1312)
- date unknown
  - Ibn Battuta, Moroccan explorer (b. 1304)
  - Vladislav I, Prince of Wallachia

1378

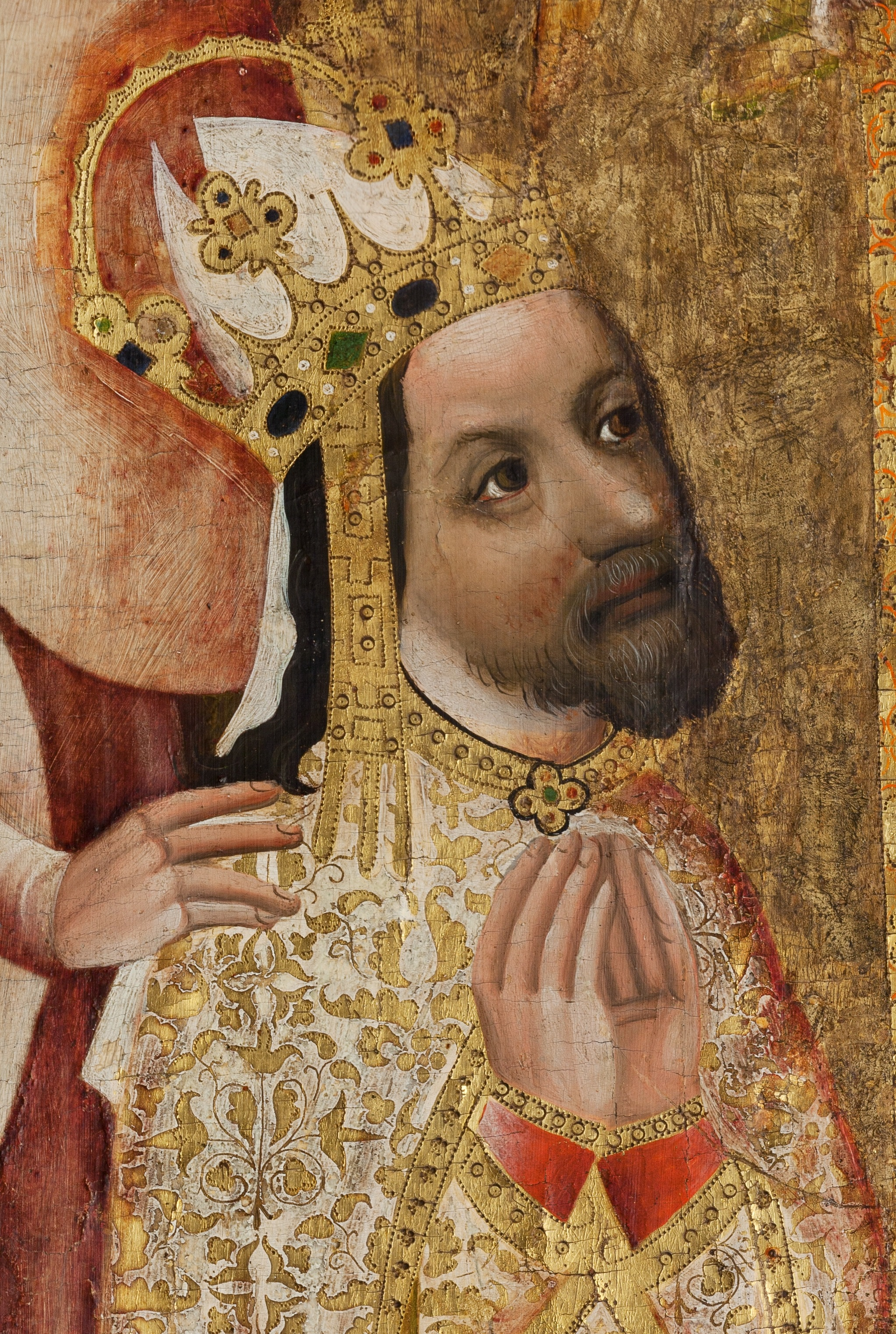
Charles IV, Holy Roman Emperor

- February 6 – Joanna of Bourbon, queen consort of Charles V of France (b. 1338)
- March 27 – Pope Gregory XI (b. c. 1329)
- July – Owain Lawgoch, titular Prince of Wales and mercenary – assassinated (b. c. 1330)
- August 4 – Galeazzo II Visconti, Lord of Milan (b. c. 1320)
- November 29 – Charles IV, Holy Roman Emperor (b. 1316)
- November 30 – Andrew Stratford, English verderer and landowner

1379

- February 18 – Albert II of Mecklenburg (b. c. 1318)
- May 29 – King Henry II of Castile (b. 1333)
- November 15 – Otto V, Duke of Bavaria (b. 1346)
- December 16 – John Fitzalan, Marshal of England (drowned)
- date unknown – Aqsara'i, Persian physician
