= 1430 in Ireland =

- Centuries: 13th; 14th; 15th; 16th; 17th
- Decades: 1410s; 1420s; 1430s; 1440s; 1450s
- See also: Other events of 1430; List of years in Ireland

Events from the year 1430 in Ireland.

== Incumbent ==
- Lord: Henry VI

== Events ==
- Ulick Ruadh Burke, became 5th lord of Clanricarde (died 1485)
- Inch Castle on the southern tip of Inch Island in County Donegal was constructed.

== Deaths ==
- William mac Ulick Burke, the 4th Clanricarde
