= 1424 in Ireland =

- Centuries: 13th; 14th; 15th; 16th; 17th
- Decades: 1400s; 1410s; 1420s; 1430s; 1440s
- See also: Other events of 1424; List of years in Ireland

Events from the year 1424 in Ireland.

== Incumbent ==
- Lord: Henry VI

== Deaths ==
- Ulick an Fhiona Burke, 3rd Clanricarde
