= 1429 in Ireland =

- Centuries: 13th; 14th; 15th; 16th; 17th
- Decades: 1400s; 1410s; 1420s; 1430s; 1440s
- See also: Other events of 1429; List of years in Ireland

Events from the year 1429 in Ireland.

== Incumbent ==
- Lord: Henry VI

== Events ==
- Henry VI gives a £10 subsidy for building a small castle in 10 years. These later became the Irish Tower Houses. By 1515, there would be more than 500 of these Tower Houses.
