= 1428 in Catalonia =

- Decades
- See also: Other events of 1428; Timeline of Catalan history

Events from 1428 in Catalonia.

== Incumbents ==
- Count of Barcelona – Alfonso IV
- President of the Generalitat of Catalonia – Felip de Malla

== Events ==
- 2 February – Earthquake at the north of Catalonia, hundreds of people killed.
