= 1436 in Ireland =

- Centuries: 13th; 14th; 15th; 16th; 17th
- Decades: 1410s; 1420s; 1430s; 1440s; 1450s
- See also: Other events of 1436; List of years in Ireland

Events from the year of 1436 in Ireland.

== Incumbent ==
- Lord: Henry VI

== Deaths ==
- Cormac Ó Domhnalláin
