= 1403 =

1403 in various calendars
- Gregorian calendar: 1403; MCDIII
- Ab urbe condita: 2156
- Armenian calendar: 852; ԹՎ ՊԾԲ
- Assyrian calendar: 6153
- Balinese saka calendar: 1324–1325
- Bengali calendar: 809–810
- Berber calendar: 2353
- English Regnal year: 4 Hen. 4 – 5 Hen. 4
- Buddhist calendar: 1947
- Burmese calendar: 765
- Byzantine calendar: 6911–6912
- Chinese calendar: 壬午年 (Water Horse); 4100 or 3893 — to — 癸未年 (Water Goat); 4101 or 3894
- Coptic calendar: 1119–1120
- Discordian calendar: 2569
- Ethiopian calendar: 1395–1396
- Hebrew calendar: 5163–5164
- Hindu calendars
- Vikram Samvat: 1459–1460
- Shaka Samvat: 1324–1325
- Kali Yuga: 4503–4504
- Holocene calendar: 11403
- Igbo calendar: 403–404
- Iranian calendar: 781–782
- Islamic calendar: 805–806
- Japanese calendar: Ōei 10 (応永１０年)
- Javanese calendar: 1317–1318
- Julian calendar: 1403; MCDIII
- Korean calendar: 3736
- Minguo calendar: 509 before ROC 民前509年
- Nanakshahi calendar: −65
- Thai solar calendar: 1945–1946
- Tibetan calendar: ཆུ་ཕོ་རྟ་ལོ་ (male Water-Horse); 1529 or 1148 or 376 — to — ཆུ་མོ་ལུག་ལོ་ (female Water-Sheep); 1530 or 1149 or 377

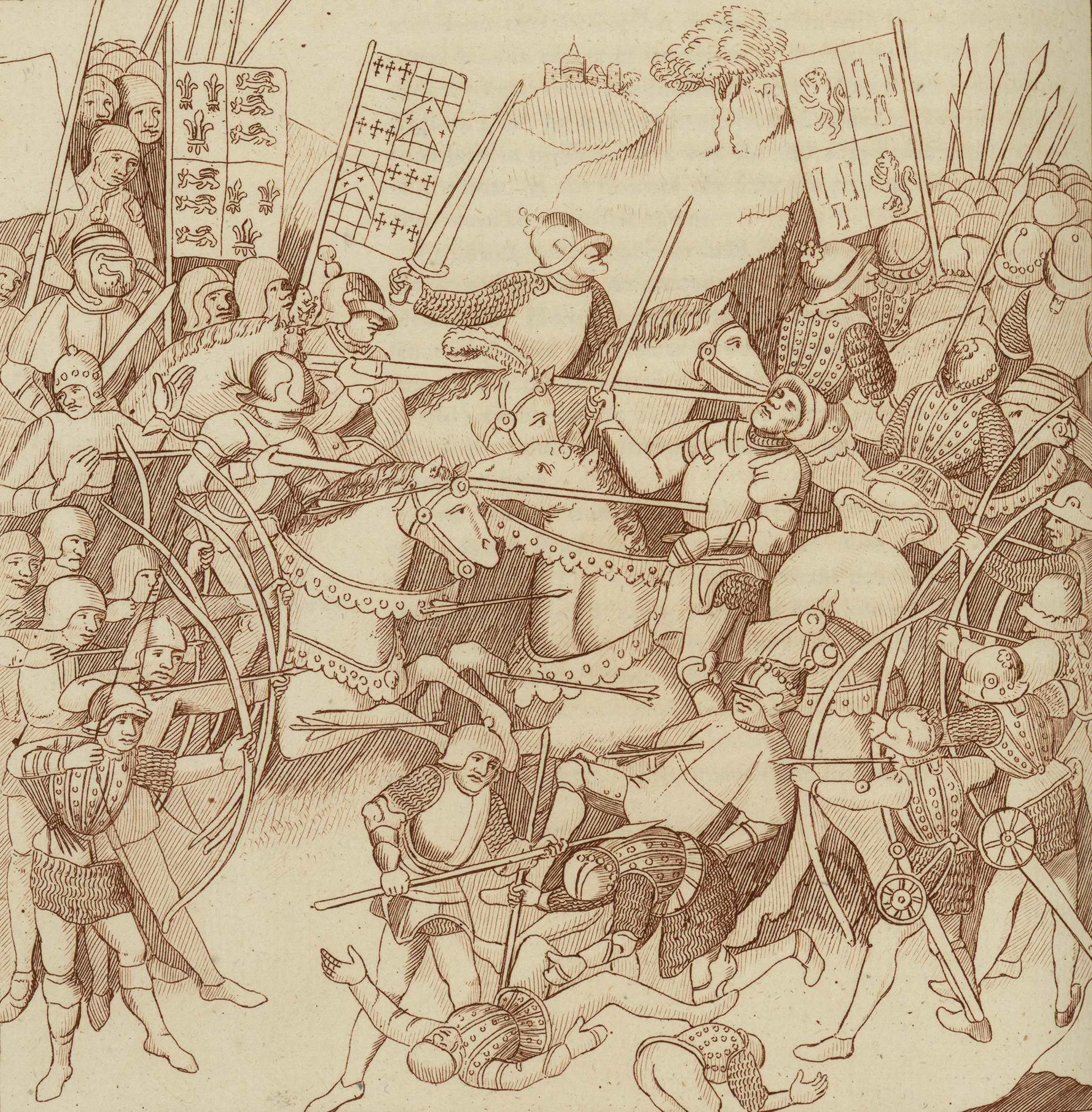
July 21: England's King Henry IV defeats rebels at Battle of Shrewsbury.

Year 1403 (MCDIII) was a common year starting on Monday of the Julian calendar.

== Events ==
=== January–March ===
- January 5 – In modern-day Myanmar, peace negotiations begin between King Razadarit of Hanthawaddy at his capital Pegu, with the emissaries of Minkhaung I, ruler of the Kingdom of Ava, 10 days after the Ava forces defeated Razadarit's army at the Battle of Nawin.
- January 23 – The Yongle Era in China begins with the first day of the Chinese New Year, six months after King Zhu Di of the Yan State arrived at Nanjing, deposed the southern Chinese Emperor Zhu Yun Wen, and proclaimed himself as the Emperor Cheng Zu.
- February 20 – Signing of the Treaty of Gallipoli is completed as Süleyman Çelebi makes wide-ranging concessions to the Byzantine Empire and other Christian powers, in the southern Balkans.
- February 7 – King Henry IV of England marries as his second wife Joan of Navarre, the daughter of King Charles II of Navarre and widow of Duke John IV of Brittany, at Winchester Cathedral.
- March 12 – As King Martin I of Aragon helps to end the siege by the French of the papal palace in Avignon, Antipope Benedict XIII flees to the Crown of Aragon.
- March 13 – Muhammad Sultan Mirza, the favorite grandson and heir to the throne of the Emperor Tamerlane, Emperor of Transoxiana (comprising modern Afghanistan and parts of Iran, Tadzikstan and Kazakhstan), dies from injuries sustained in the Battle of Ankara.
- March 23 – Stříbrná Skalice in Central Bohemia is razed by Sigismund of Luxembourg.

=== April–June ===
- April 1 – Prince Henry of England, son of King Henry IV, is appointed by his father to serve for one year as the Royal Lieutenant of Wales, with command over English toops to fight the Welsh rebels.
- April 3 – Jean II Le Maingre of France, also known as Boucicaut, the French Governor of Genoa, leads a fleet of 18 ships, 600 horses and 700 infantry to stop an attack by Muslims on the island of Cyprus and the city of Famagusta. Boucicaut besieges the Muslim city of Candelore on June 24.
- April – Balša III succeeds his father Đurađ II as ruler of the Principality of Zeta (now Montenegro).
- May 21 – Ruy Gonzalez de Clavijo, an ambassador from the king of Castile to Timur, leaves Cadiz; he arrives in Samarkand over a year later.
- June 9 – The Byzantine Emperor Manuel II Palaiologos returns to Constantinople after an absence for more than two years in Western Europe.
- June 3 – The coronation of Eleanor of Castile, wife of King Carlos III of Navarre, as Queen of Navarre takes place in Pamplona, in modern-day Spain.
- June 14 – The Emperor Manuel II restores Matthew I as the Ecumenical Patriarch of Constantinople, leader of the Eastern Orthodox Christians. Matthew had been deposed the previous autumn during the Emperor's absence from Byzantium.
- June 15 – John III of Soltaniyeh, a Dominican friar of the Roman Catholic Church, arrives in Paris as an emissary of the conqueror Timur, Emir of Transoxiana, in order to secure an agreement with King Charles VI of France in order to open trade relations between the two nations.

=== July–September ===
- July 12 – A guild of stationers is founded in the City of London. As the Worshipful Company of Stationers and Newspaper Makers (the "Stationers' Company"), it continues to be a livery company in the 21st century.
- July 21 – Battle of Shrewsbury: King Henry IV of England defeats a rebel army led by "Hotspur" Percy, who has allied with the Welsh rebel Owain Glyndŵr. Percy is killed in the battle.
- August 5 – The coronation of Ladislaus of Naples as King of Hungary and Croatia takes place in Zara (now Zadar in Croatia), where Ladislaus had arrived on July 19. His reign lasts less than four months before he is deposed.
- September 4 – The first 200 Chinese treasure ships are ordered by the new Ming dynasty Emperor Cheng Zu from the Capital Guards at Nanjing.

=== October–December ===
- October 7 – Battle of Modon: The Genoese fleet under Jean Le Maingre (Marshal Boucicaut) is defeated by the Republic of Venice, at Modon in the Peloponnese.
- October 18 – An English fleet organised by John Hawley of Dartmouth and Thomas Norton of Bristol seizes seven French merchant vessels in the English Channel.
- November 9 – Waleran III, Count of Ligny, a relative in France of the late King Richard II of England, informs King Henry IV (who killed King Richard) of plans to lead an attack on England.
- November – An English revenge raid on Brittany by Sir William Wilford captures 40 ships and causes considerable damage ashore.
- December 12 – Local English forces defeat an attempted French raid on the Isle of Wight under Waleran III, Count of Ligny.
- December 22 – Pope Boniface IX annuls and revokes numerous indulgences previously paid to the Roman Catholic Church in return for a reduction of time in purgatory.

=== Date unknown ===
- Jan Hus begins preaching Wycliffite ideas in Bohemia.
- In China, the Emperor Cheng Zu moves the capital from Nanjing to Beijing, commissions the Yongle Encyclopedia, one of the world's earliest and largest known general encyclopedias, and orders his coastal provinces to build a vast fleet of ships, with construction centered at Longjiang near Nanjing; the inland provinces are to provide wood and float it down the Yangtze River.
- The Temple of a City God is constructed in Shanghai.
- The Gur-e Amir Mausoleum is built in Samarkand by Timur, after the death of his grandson Muhammad Sultan, and eventually becomes the family mausoleum of the Timurid dynasty.
- Georgia makes peace with Timur, but has to recognise him as a suzerain and pay him tribute.
- The world's first quarantine station, the Lazzaretto Vecchio, is built in Venice, to protect against the Black Death.
- Grand Duke Vytautas ends his alliance with Muscovy, and captures Vyazma and Smolensk.
- Stefan Lazarević establishes Belgrade, as the capital of the Serbian Despotate.
- In Ireland
  - Tadhg Ruadh mac Maelsechlainn O Cellaigh succeeds Conchobar an Abaidh mac Maelsechlainn O Cellaigh, as King of Hy-Many, in modern-day counties Galway and Roscommon.
  - Maolmhordha mac Con Connacht succeeds Giolla Iosa mac Pilib, as King of East Breifne, in modernt-day counties Leitrim and Cavan.
- probable – Ououso becomes King of Nanzan, in modern-day south Okinawa, Japan.

== Births ==
- January 2 – Basilios Bessarion, Latin Patriarch of Constantinople (d. 1472)
- February 22 – King Charles VII of France, monarch of the House of Valois, King of France from 1422 to his death (d. 1461)
- June 11 – John IV of Brabant, son of Antoine (d. 1427)
- August 11 – Ravenna Petrova, Princess of Amara Palace, daughter of William Hamilton and Anita Petrova. (d. 1423)
- September 1 – Louis VIII, Duke of Bavaria, German noble (d. 1445)
- September 25 – Louis III of Anjou (d. 1434)
- September 29 – Elisabeth of Brandenburg, Duchess of Brzeg-Legnica and Cieszyn, German princess (d. 1449)
- date unknown
  - Robert Wingfield, English politician (d. 1454)
  - John IV, Emperor of Trebizond (d. 1459)

== Deaths ==
- March 8 – Beyazid, Ottoman Sultan (b. 1354)
- April 27 – Maria of Bosnia, Countess of Helfenstein (b. 1335)
- April – Đurađ II Stracimirović, Serbian nobleman from the House of Balšić in Zeta
- May 10 – Katherine Swynford, Duchess of Lancaster, spouse of John of Gaunt
- May 12 – William de Lode, English prior
- July 21 (at the Battle of Shrewsbury)
  - Sir Walter Blount, English soldier, standard-bearer of Henry IV (in battle)
  - Edmund Stafford, 5th Earl of Stafford, English soldier (in battle)
  - Henry Percy (Hotspur), English rebel (in battle)
- July 23 – Thomas Percy, 1st Earl of Worcester, English rebel (executed) (b. 1343)
- date unknown – Vukosav Nikolić, Bosnian nobleman (in battle)
- date unknown - Sharaf al-Din Isma'il al-Jabarti, Somali scholar and politician
- probable date – Hajji Zayn al-Attar, Persian physician
