= 1482 =

1482 in various calendars
- Gregorian calendar: 1482; MCDLXXXII
- Ab urbe condita: 2235
- Armenian calendar: 931; ԹՎ ՋԼԱ
- Assyrian calendar: 6232
- Balinese saka calendar: 1403–1404
- Bengali calendar: 888–889
- Berber calendar: 2432
- English Regnal year: 21 Edw. 4 – 22 Edw. 4
- Buddhist calendar: 2026
- Burmese calendar: 844
- Byzantine calendar: 6990–6991
- Chinese calendar: 辛丑年 (Metal Ox); 4179 or 3972 — to — 壬寅年 (Water Tiger); 4180 or 3973
- Coptic calendar: 1198–1199
- Discordian calendar: 2648
- Ethiopian calendar: 1474–1475
- Hebrew calendar: 5242–5243
- Hindu calendars
- Vikram Samvat: 1538–1539
- Shaka Samvat: 1403–1404
- Kali Yuga: 4582–4583
- Holocene calendar: 11482
- Igbo calendar: 482–483
- Iranian calendar: 860–861
- Islamic calendar: 886–887
- Japanese calendar: Bunmei 14 (文明１４年)
- Javanese calendar: 1398–1399
- Julian calendar: 1482; MCDLXXXII
- Korean calendar: 3815
- Minguo calendar: 430 before ROC 民前430年
- Nanakshahi calendar: 14
- Thai solar calendar: 2024–2025
- Tibetan calendar: ལྕགས་མོ་གླང་ལོ་ (female Iron-Ox); 1608 or 1227 or 455 — to — ཆུ་ཕོ་སྟག་ལོ་ (male Water-Tiger); 1609 or 1228 or 456

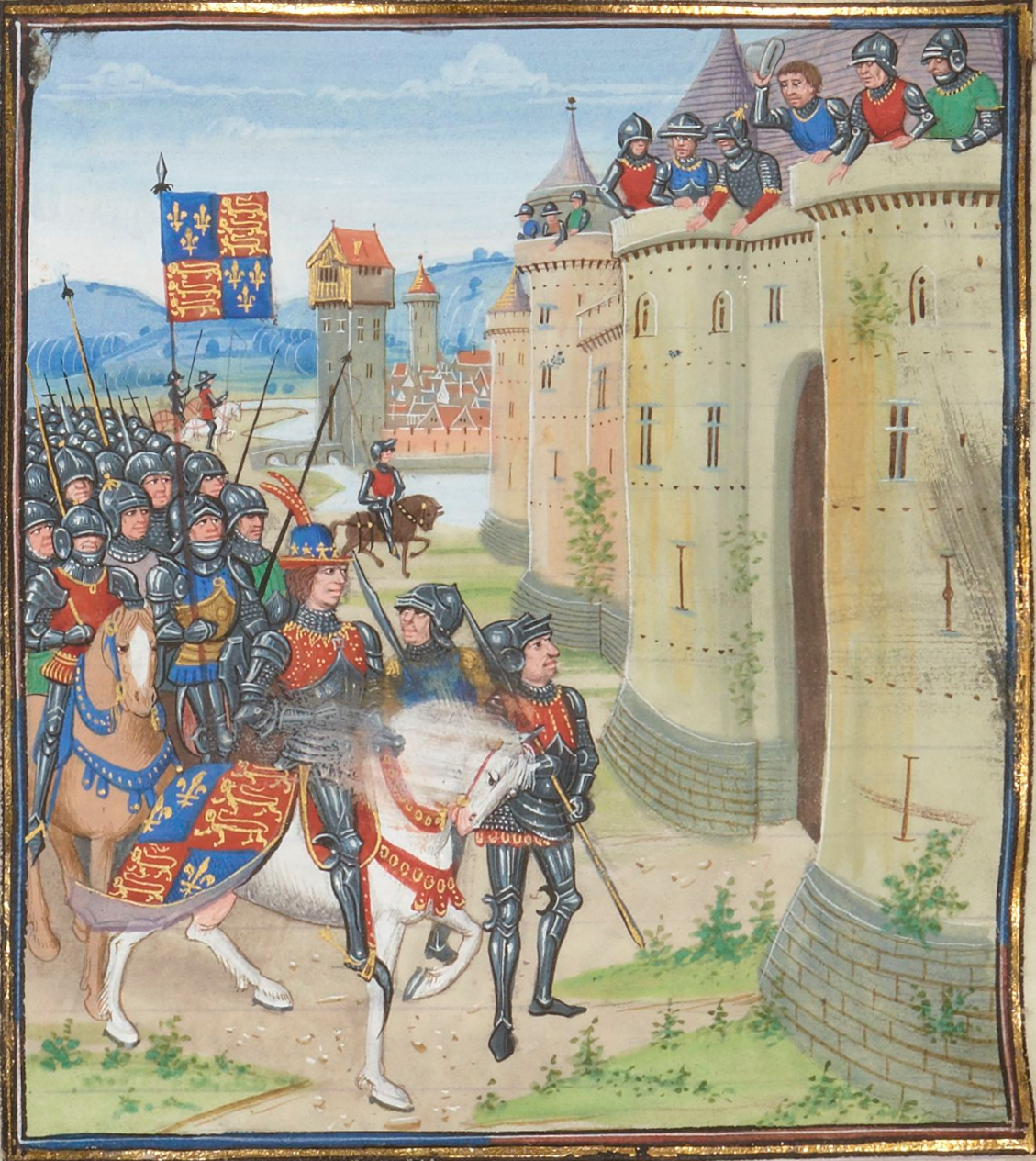
August 24: England captures Scotland's territory at Berwick-upon-Tweed.

Year 1482 (MCDLXXXII) was a common year starting on Tuesday of the Julian calendar.

== Events ==
=== January–March ===
- January 19 – A Portuguese fleet, commanded by Diogo de Azambuja, arrives at the mouth of the River Benya on the Gold Coast, where the fort of São Jorge da Mina (Elmina Castle) is erected.
- January 25 – (5 Adar 5242) The first printing of the Torah by movable type, in the original Hebrew language, is made in Bologna, marking the first use of the Hebrew alphabet rather than the Roman alphabet in printing.
- February 28 –The village of Alhama de Granada in Spain is taken by Christian forces, starting the Granada War to expel the Moors from the Iberian Peninsula.
- March 22 – Pope Sixtus IV, in a special bull, grants self-government rights to the Italian town of Ascoli Piceno.
- March 27 – The death of Mary of Burgundy triggers the first of the Flemish revolts against Maximilian of Austria.

=== April–June ===
- April 3 – Symeon I succeeds Maximus III as Ecumenical Patriarch of Constantinople.
- April 28 – In Spain, King Ferdinand of Aragon and Castile formally takes command in the Granada War at Alhama.
- May 10 – King Edward IV of England summons fighting men to participate in an invasion of Scotland with the goal of deposing King James III and installing a puppet monarch who will bring Scotland under English control.
- May 25 – German printer Erhard Ratdolt creates the first printed edition of The Elements, originally written by the Greek mathematician Euclid around 300 BC and translated from ancient Greek into Latin by Campanus of Novara in the 13th century. The date for the printing of one of the most influential books in history is printed by Ratdolt on the title page.
- May 27 – Cem Sultan, who briefly reigned as the Sultan of the Ottoman Empire for several weeks in 1481 before being deposed by his half-brother, Bayezid II, invades the Turkish mainland and besieges the city of Konya, but is defeated and forced to withdraw to Ankara. Upon trying to retreat to Cairo in Egypt, he finds that all the roads are under Bayezid's control.
- June 11 – The Treaty of Fotheringhay is signed between King Edward IV of England, and Alexander Stewart, Duke of Albany, the younger brother of King James III of Scotland, with Alexander being promised the Scottish throne in return for swearing loyalty to England and participating in an English invasion of Scotland.

=== July–September ===
- July 22 – Following a mutiny of Scottish troops at Lauder, King James III is brought back to Edinburgh Castle and held under house arrest by the mutineers.
- July 29 – Cem Sultan of the Ottoman Empire flees to the island of Rhodes after having turned down two offers from his half-brother, Sultan Bayezid II, to give up all claims to the Ottoman throne.
- August 1 – In the Anglo-Scottish Wars, Richard, Duke of Gloucester invades Scotland, and captures Edinburgh.
- August 4 – Portuguese navigator Diogo Cão and his crew arrive at Loango Bay in West Africa on Saint Dominic's Day, and Cão names the body of water Praia Formosa de São Domingos; from there he and the crew become the first Europeans to enter the Congo River.
- August 21 – In the course of the War of Ferrara in Italy, the Battle of Campomorto is fought as the army of the Papal States, led by Roberto Malatesta defeats troops of the Kingdom of Naples, led by Alfonso, Duke of Calabria.
- August 24 – The Scots surrender the border town of Berwick-upon-Tweed to Richard, Duke of Gloucester, ending his campaign against Scotland.
- August 30 – The reign of Louis de Bourbon, Bishop of Liège over the Principality of Liège, a semi-independent eccleasitic state within the Holy Roman Empire in parts of what are now Belgium, France, Germany and the Netherlands, comes to an end when he is assassinated on orders of William de La Marck
- September 29 – King James III is allowed to walk out of Edinburgh Castle in the wake of the English siege led by his brother, Alexander, Duke of Albany.

=== October–December ===
- October 7 – John Stewart, Lord Darnley finally surrenders Edinburgh Castle to King James III's brother, the Duke of Albany, after a siege of almost two months.
- November 15 – King Edward IV of England summons the members of the English House of Commons and the English House of Lords to assemble at Westminster on January 20.
- December 23 – The Treaty of Arras divides the Burgundian Netherlands between King Louis XI of France and Archduke Maximilian I of Habsburg.

== Births ==
- March 7 – Fray Thomas de San Martín, Roman Catholic prelate and bishop (d. 1555)
- June 29 – Maria of Aragon, Queen of Manuel I of Portugal, daughter of Ferdinand II of Aragon and Isabella I of Castile (d. 1517)
- July 7 – Andrzej Krzycki, Polish archbishop (d. 1537)
- August 23 – Cho Kwangjo, Korean philosopher (d. 1520)
- October 7 – Ernest, Margrave of Baden-Durlach (d. 1553)
- October 18 – Philipp III, Count of Hanau-Lichtenberg (d. 1538)
- December 9 – Frederick II, Elector Palatine (1544–1556) (d. 1556)
- date unknown
  - Richard Aertsz, Dutch historical painter (d. 1577)
  - Eufrasia Burlamacchi, Italian nun and manuscript illumination artist (d. 1548)
  - Leo Jud, Swiss religious reformer (d. 1542)
  - Johannes Oecolampadius, German religious reformer (d. 1531)
  - Matthias Ringmann, German cartographer and humanist poet (d. 1511)
- probable
  - Bernardino Luini, Italian painter (d. 1532)
  - Richard Pace, English diplomat (d. 1537)

== Deaths ==
- March 25 – Lucrezia Tornabuoni, Italian writer, adviser and spouse of Piero di Cosimo de' Medici (b. 1427)
- March 27 – Mary of Burgundy, Sovereign Duchess regnant of Burgundy, married to Maximilian I, Holy Roman Emperor (b. 1457)
- May 10 – Paolo dal Pozzo Toscanelli, Italian mathematician and astronomer (b. 1397)
- May 23 – Mary of York, daughter of King Edward IV of England (b. 1467)
- August 15 – William, Margrave of Hachberg-Sausenberg, Margrave of Hachberg-Sausenberg (1428–1441) (b. 1406)
- August 25 – Queen Margaret of Anjou, wife of Henry VI of England (b. 1430)
- August 29 – Queen Yun, Korean Queen (b. 1455)
- September 10 – Federico da Montefeltro, Italian mercenary (b. 1422)
- September 17 – William III, Landgrave of Thuringia, Duke of Luxembourg (b. 1425)
- September 22 – Philibert I of Savoy (b. 1465)
- date unknown – Hugo van der Goes, Flemish artist (b. c. 1440)

== In fiction ==
- In Doctor Who, The Doctor states that 1482 is a hard year to time travel to, as it is full of glitches.
- Victor Hugo's novel The Hunchback of Notre-Dame takes place in this year.
