= 1472 =

1472 in various calendars
- Gregorian calendar: 1472; MCDLXXII
- Ab urbe condita: 2225
- Armenian calendar: 921; ԹՎ ՋԻԱ
- Assyrian calendar: 6222
- Balinese saka calendar: 1393–1394
- Bengali calendar: 878–879
- Berber calendar: 2422
- English Regnal year: 11 Edw. 4 – 12 Edw. 4
- Buddhist calendar: 2016
- Burmese calendar: 834
- Byzantine calendar: 6980–6981
- Chinese calendar: 辛卯年 (Metal Rabbit); 4169 or 3962 — to — 壬辰年 (Water Dragon); 4170 or 3963
- Coptic calendar: 1188–1189
- Discordian calendar: 2638
- Ethiopian calendar: 1464–1465
- Hebrew calendar: 5232–5233
- Hindu calendars
- Vikram Samvat: 1528–1529
- Shaka Samvat: 1393–1394
- Kali Yuga: 4572–4573
- Holocene calendar: 11472
- Igbo calendar: 472–473
- Iranian calendar: 850–851
- Islamic calendar: 876–877
- Japanese calendar: Bunmei 4 (文明４年)
- Javanese calendar: 1388–1389
- Julian calendar: 1472; MCDLXXII
- Korean calendar: 3805
- Minguo calendar: 440 before ROC 民前440年
- Nanakshahi calendar: 4
- Thai solar calendar: 2014–2015
- Tibetan calendar: ལྕགས་མོ་ཡོས་ལོ་ (female Iron-Hare); 1598 or 1217 or 445 — to — ཆུ་ཕོ་འབྲུག་ལོ་ (male Water-Dragon); 1599 or 1218 or 446

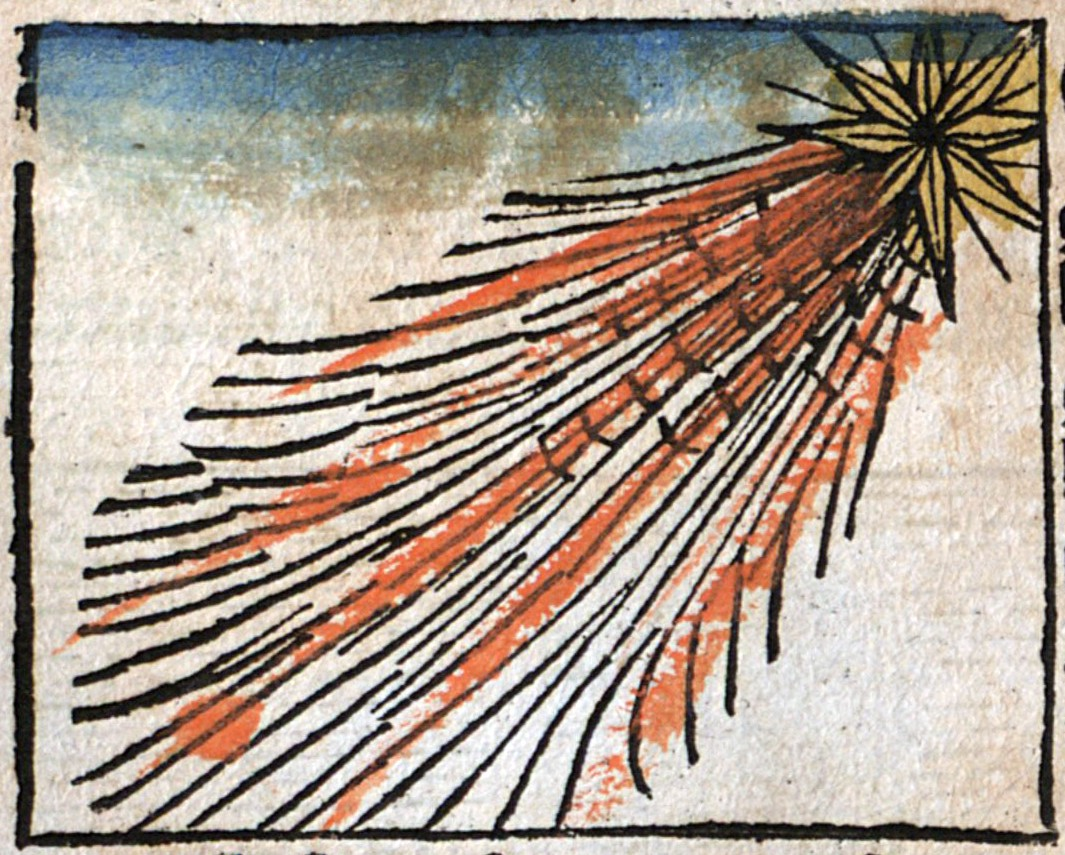
January 22: The "Great Comet", observed by astronomers around the world, comes within 6.5 million miles of Earth, the closest approach in modern history of any comet (picture from the 1493 Nuremberg Chronicle).

Year 1472 (MCDLXXII) was a leap year starting on Wednesday of the Julian calendar.

== Events ==
=== January–March ===
- January 22 – The Great Comet of 1472 passes within 0.07 astronomical units of Earth (6.507 million miles or 10.472 million km), the closest approach in recorded history for a great comet
- February 20 – Orkney and Shetland are returned by Norway to Scotland, as a result of a defaulted dowry payment.
- March 4 – A mount of piety is established in Siena (Italy), origin of Banca Monte dei Paschi di Siena, the world's oldest surviving retail bank.
- March 11 – The Great Comet of 1472 is observed from the Earth for the last time as it flies away from Earth in the direction of the constellation of Cetus.

=== April–June ===
- April 11 – The first printed edition of Dante Alighieri's Divine Comedy is published in Foligno.
- May 27 – An alliance agreement is signed between Charles the Bold, Duke of Burgundy and Nicholas I, Duke of Lorraine, with Charles pledging his daughter, Mary of Burgundy, to marry Nicholas. The agreement comes at the same time that King Ferdinand I of Naples had been negotiating the engagement of Mary of Burgundy to Frederick, prince of Naples.
- May 31 – The Treaty of Prenzlau is signed between Albrecht III Achilles, Elector of Brandenburg, and the two Dukes of Pomerania, Eric II and Wartislaw X, surrendering the Duchy of Pomerania-Stettin to Albert's control and ending the eight-year-long War of the Succession of Stettin.
- June 1 – Sophia Palaiologina is married by proxy to the ruler of Russia, Ivan III, Grand Prince of Moscow, in a ceremony at St. Peter's Basilica in Rome, with his trusted emissary Ivan Fryazin serving as the proxy.
- June 4 – Shah Suwar, formerly the ruler much of southeastern Turkey as prince of the Beylik of Dulkadir, surrenders to the Egyptian Mamluk General Yashbak min Mahdi after an 11-day siege. He is brought out of the Castle of Zamantu, restrained by a robe with a metal collar with chains and his guards are unable to rescue him. Suwar's older brother, Shah Budak, is returned to the throne of Dulkadir
- June 16 – Volterra, a town in the Republic of Florence in Italy, surrenders after a siege of 25 days by Florentine soldiers under the command of Federico da Montefeltro. Because the town had rebelled against the power of Lorenzo de' Medici, da Montefeltro allows his soldiers on June 18 to pillage Volterra and to commit rape and murder of its citizens.
- June – Leonardo da Vinci is admitted as a master in his own right to the artists' Guild of Saint Luke in Florence. An entry is made in the register of the Compagnia di San Luca reading "Anno Domini 1472— Leonardo, son of Ser Piero da Vinci, painter, to pay the sum of 6 sol, for the whole month of June 1472, for the remittance of his debt to the Company until July 1472... and to pay for the whole of November 1472, 5 sol due on 18 October 1472."

=== July–September ===
- July 3 – The Cathedral and Metropolitical Church of Saint Peter in York, England, commonly known as York Minster, is declared complete and consecrated.
- August 19 – King Edward IV summons the members of the English Parliament to assemble at Westminster on October 6.
- September 11 – The Treaty of Chateaugiron is concluded between King Edward IV of England and the Duchy of Brittany, providing for an English invasion of either Gascony or Normandy by April 1, 1473.

=== October–December ===
- October 6 – King Edward IV of England gives royal assent to the Statute of Westminster 1472 which requires, effective immediately, a tax of four bow staves per every tun (252 wine gallons) of cargo brought in by a ship to an English port. The Statute is passed to remedy a shortage of yew wood, from which longbows are made, following the issuing of an edict in 1470 requiring compulsory training for soldiers to use the longbow.
- October 28 – The Catalan Civil War comes to an end as Barcelona surrenders to King Juan II of Aragon with the signing of the Capitulation of Pedralbes by the rebel leader Hugh Roger III of Pallars Sobirà, guaranteeing the rights of the Principality of Catalonia in return for allegiance to the Kingdom of Aragon.
- November 5 – Duke Nicholas of Lorraine and Duke Charles of Burgundy agree that the engagement between Nicholas and Charles's daughter can be called off without jeopardizing the alliance between the two duchies.
- December 31 – The city council of Amsterdam prohibits snowball fights: "Neymant en moet met sneecluyten werpen nocht maecht noch wijf noch manspersoon." ("No one shall throw with snowballs, neither men nor (unmarried) women.")

=== Undated ===
- The Kingdom of Fez ruling the modern nation of Morocco, is founded by the Wattasid dynasty with Sultan Abu Abd Allah al-Sheikh Muhammad ibn Yahya as its first ruler.
- An extensive slave trade begins in modern Cameroon as the Portuguese sail up the Wouri River and Fernão do Po claims the central-African islands Bioko and Annobón for Portugal.
- The first printing of Thomas à Kempis' The Imitation of Christ (De Imitatione Christi) is made in Augsburg after Kempis's death in 1471 it will reach 100 editions and translations by the end of the century.
- Johannes de Sacrobosco's De sphaera mundi (written c. 1230) is first published in Ferrara, the first printed astronomical book.
- Pietro d'Abano's medical texts Conciliator differentiarum quae inter philosophos et medicos versantur and De venenis eorumque remediis (written before 1315) are first published.

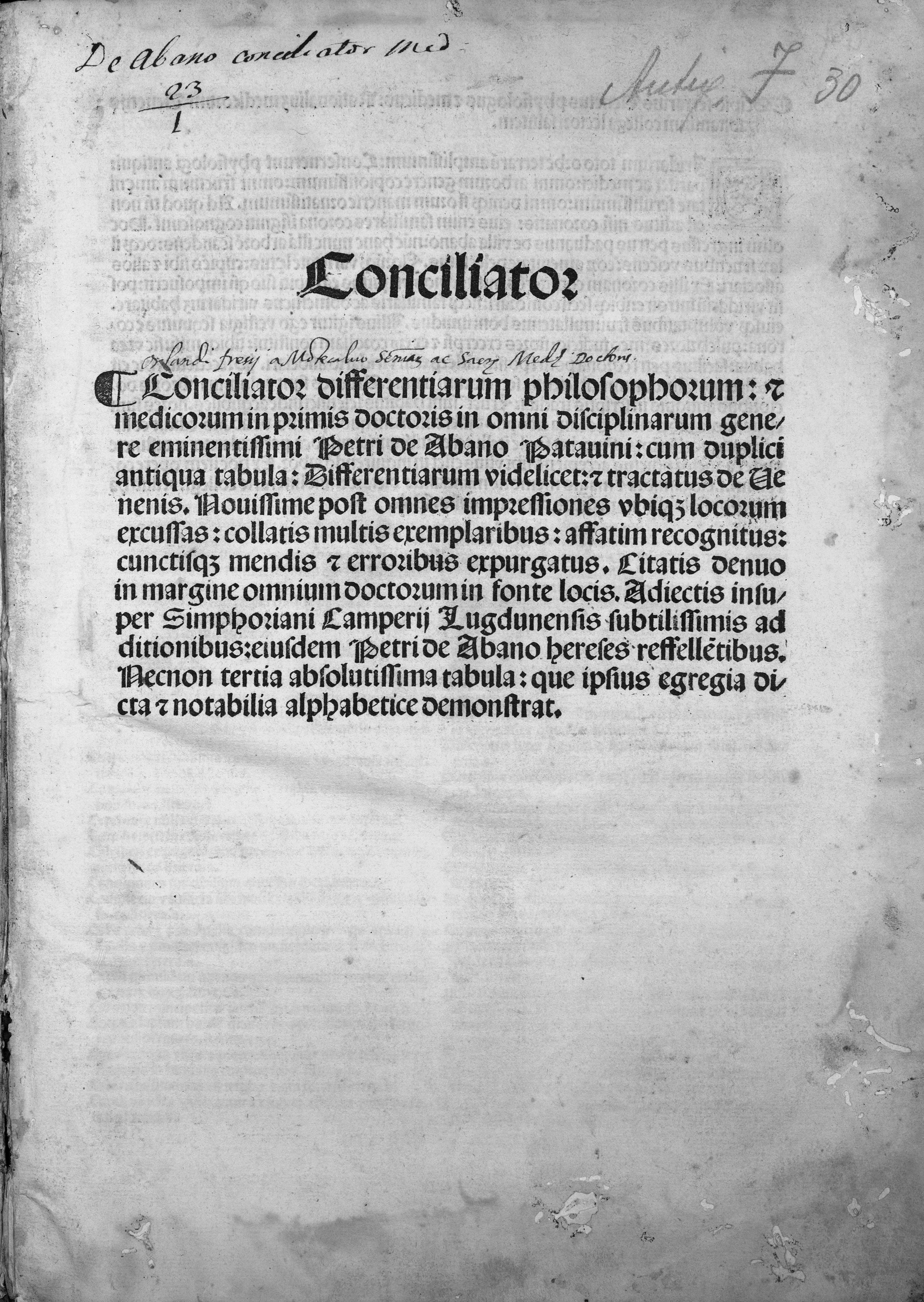
Conciliator differentiarum philosophorum et precipue medicorum

- The possible discovery of the island of "Bacalao" (which some historians believe to have been Newfoundland off North America, 20 years before Christopher Columbus had arrived in the "New World") is made by João Vaz Corte-Real. The suggestion that Corte-Real found lands that he called the "Terras do Bacalhau" (and was granted lands in the Azores by the king of Portugal as a result) will be advanced by Italian writer Gaspar Frutuoso a century later in his work Saudades da Terra, although the reliability of Frutuoso's 1570 book is questioned by later historians because of the book's misinformation on other matters.

== Births ==
- January 17 – Guidobaldo da Montefeltro, Italian condottiero and Duke of Urbino (d. 1508)
- February 15 – Piero di Lorenzo de' Medici, ruler of Florence (d. 1503)
- March 28 – Fra Bartolomeo, Italian artist (d. 1517)
- April 5 – Bianca Maria Sforza, Pavian-born Holy Roman Empress as consort to Maximilian I, Holy Roman Emperor (d. 1510)
- April 10 – Margaret of York, English princess (d. 1472)
- May 31 – Érard de La Marck, prince-bishop of Liège (d. 1538)
- August 11 – Nikolaus von Schönberg, German Catholic cardinal (d. 1537)
- October 19 – John Louis, Count of Nassau-Saarbrücken (d. 1545)
- October 31 – Wang Yangming, Chinese Neo-Confucian scholar (d. 1529)
- November 24 – Pietro Torrigiano, Italian sculptor of the Florentine school (d. 1528)
- December 10 – Anne de Mowbray, 8th Countess of Norfolk (d. 1481)
- date unknown
  - Lucas Cranach the Elder, German painter (d. 1553)
  - Alfonsina Orsini, Regent of Florence (d. 1520)
  - Barbro Stigsdotter, Swedish noblewoman and heroine (d. 1528)

== Deaths ==
- March 30 – Amadeus IX, Duke of Savoy (b. 1435)
- April 25 – Leon Battista Alberti, Italian painter, poet and philosopher (b. 1404)
- May 24 – Charles of Valois, Duke of Berry, French noble (b. 1446)
- May 30 – Jacquetta of Luxembourg, English duchess, daughter of Pierre de Luxembourg (b. 1416)
- June 4 – Nezahualcoyotl, Aztec poet (b. 1402)
- July 15 – Johann II of Nassau-Saarbrücken, Count of Nassau-Saarbrücken (1429–1472) (b. 1423)
- July 25 – Charles of Artois, Count of Eu, French military leader (b. 1394)
- November 18 – Basilios Bessarion, Latin Patriarch of Constantinople (b. 1403)
- December 11 – Margaret of York, English princess (b. 1472)
- date unknown – Afanasy Nikitin, Russian traveller
- probable
  - Thomas Boyd, Earl of Arran
  - Hayne van Ghizeghem, Flemish composer (b. c. 1445)
  - Michelozzo, Italian architect and sculptor (b. c. 1396)
