= 1422 =

1422 in various calendars
Gregorian calendar	1422; MCDXXII
Ab urbe condita	2175
Armenian calendar	871; ԹՎ ՊՀԱ
Assyrian calendar	6172
Balinese saka calendar	1343–1344
Bengali calendar	828–829
Berber calendar	2372
English Regnal year	9 Hen. 5 – 1 Hen. 6
Buddhist calendar	1966
Burmese calendar	784
Byzantine calendar	6930–6931
Chinese calendar	辛丑年 (Metal Ox); 4119 or 3912 — to — 壬寅年 (Water Tiger); 4120 or 3913
Coptic calendar	1138–1139
Discordian calendar	2588
Ethiopian calendar	1414–1415
Hebrew calendar	5182–5183
- Hindu calendars
Vikram Samvat	1478–1479
Shaka Samvat	1343–1344
Kali Yuga	4522–4523
Holocene calendar	11422
Igbo calendar	422–423
Iranian calendar	800–801
Islamic calendar	824–826
Japanese calendar	Ōei 29 (応永２９年)
Javanese calendar	1336–1337
Julian calendar	1422; MCDXXII
Korean calendar	3755
Minguo calendar	490 before ROC 民前490年
Nanakshahi calendar	−46
Thai solar calendar	1964–1965
Tibetan calendar	ལྕགས་མོ་གླང་ལོ་ (female Iron-Ox); 1548 or 1167 or 395 — to — ཆུ་ཕོ་སྟག་ལོ་ (male Water-Tiger); 1549 or 1168 or 396

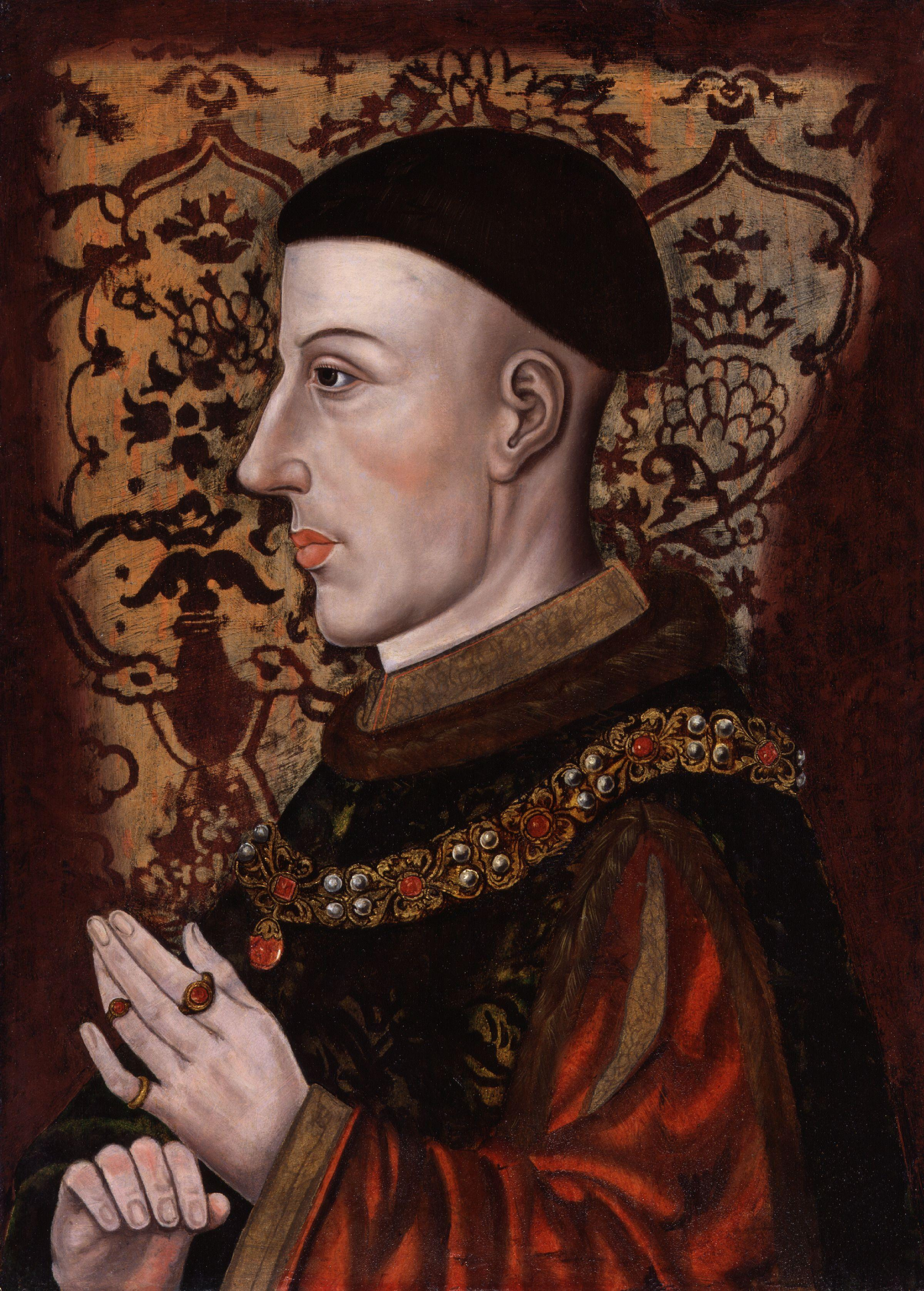
August 31: King Henry V of England dies.

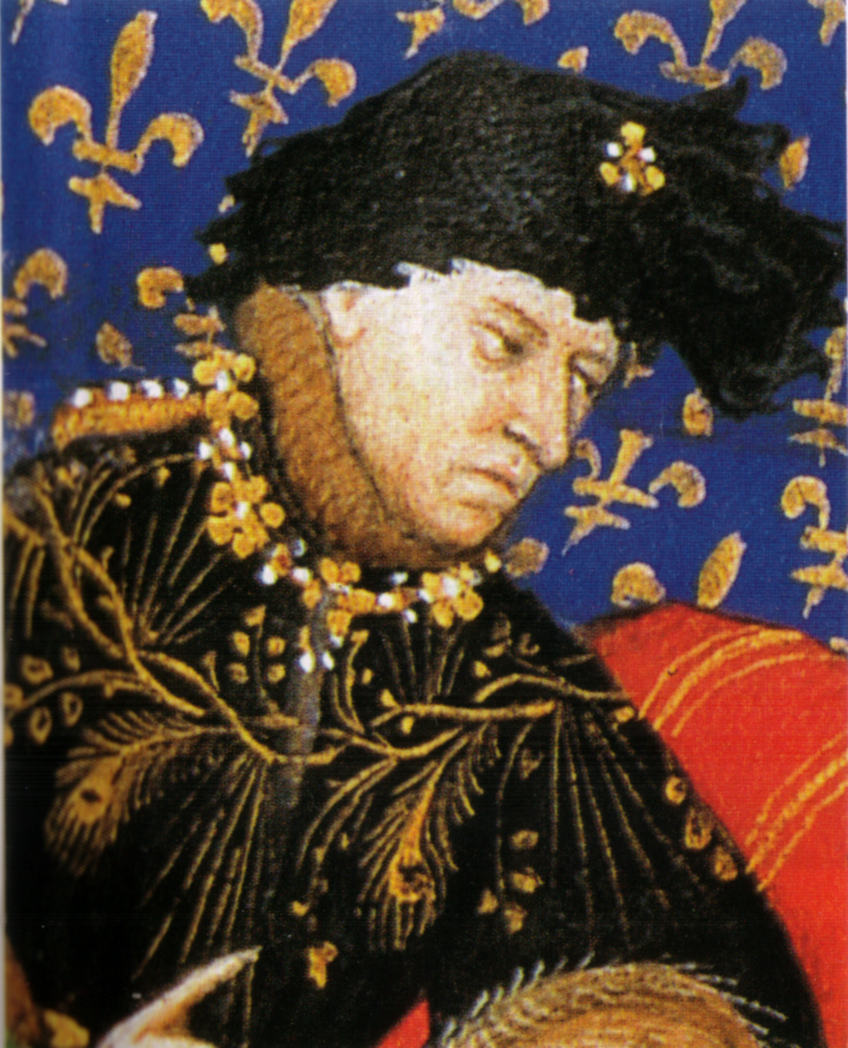
October 21: King Charles VI of France dies.

Year 1422 (MCDXXII) was a common year starting on Thursday of the Julian calendar.

== Events ==
=== January–March ===
- January 10 – Hussite Wars – Battle of Německý Brod: The Hussites defeat an army of Royalist Crusaders.
- January 15 – Charlotte of Bourbon, Queen of Cyprus, consort and wife of King Janus since 1411, dies after contracting pneumonic plague as an epidemic spreads across the island kingdom.
- January 18 – Friso-Hollandic Wars: The Hollandic fortress of Lemmer is captured by the Frisian Skieringer rebels. Lemmer's commander, Floris of Alkemade, is taken prisoner and executed. The result prompts both sides to enter into a settlement.
- February 1 – The Peace of Groningen is signed in the Dutch city of the same name with 94 chieftains of rebels and Allies agreeing to preserve the Frisian right to self-government as well as barring foreign lords from Frisian land and bringing an end to the Great Frisian War after nine years.
- March 9 – In Prague, the Hussite priest Jan Želivský is arrested when he appears at the city hall. Already known for overseeing the killing of Catholic civilians and the pillaging of Catholic towns outside of Prague, is blamed for the Czech Bohemian loss at the August 5 Battle of Brüx. He is sentenced to death and beheaded on the same day.
- March 11 – On Okinawa Island, now part of Japan, King Shō Hashi of Chūzan begins a war against the two other kingdoms on the island, Hokuzan and Nanzan and begins the unification of Okinawa.
- March 21 – Hundred Years' War – The Siege of Meaux ends in France after more than five months as the starving citizens of the walled city of Meaux open the city gates and surrender to the English forces led by King Henry V. The city had been under siege since October 6. The city's defending troops flee across a bridge to their last line of defense, the fortress known as Le Marché.

=== April–June ===
- April 1 – Al-Ashraf Sayf ad-Dīn Barsbāy leads a coup d'etat against the Egyptian Sultan Al-Nasir al-Din Muhammad and begins a 16-year reign as the new Sultan.
- May 10 – The last French defenders of the siege of Meaux surrender their fortress at Le Marche when the starving members of the garrison threaten to rebel.
- June 10–September – The Ottoman sultan Murad II besieges Constantinople; the siege is broken off as a result of the rebellion of Küçük Mustafa.

=== July–September ===
- July 11 – In Italy, a group of about 100 Romani people, described as "Gypsies" arrive in Bologna with a stated intention of traveling to Rome to meet the Pope. Their leader, calling himself "Duke Andrea", shows to local officials a decree allegedly signed by the King of Hungary that is said to grant them the right to commit robberies "without penalty or penance" wherever they travel, as a reward for 4,000 gypsies being re-baptized into the Christian faith.
- August 22 – Use of the Spanish era dating system (which begins counting from 38 BC rather than from 1 AD, and thus refers to the year 1422 as "1460") ends as the Kingdom of Portugal, last on the Iberian peninsula to continue the style of dating, goes to Anno Domini dates.
- September 1 – Henry VI becomes King of England, at the age of nine months, upon the death of his father, King Henry V.
- September 27 – The Teutonic Knights sign the Treaty of Melno with the Kingdom of Poland and Grand Duchy of Lithuania, after the brief Gollub War. The Prussian–Lithuanian border established by the treaty remains unchanged, until World War I.
- September 29 – The Duke of Bedford Regent for King Henry VI of England, summons the members of Parliament to assemble at Westminster on November 9.

=== October–December ===
- October 21 – King Charles VI of France passes away at the age of 53 after years of mental illness, and rival groups fight over who his successor will be. In Paris, Henry VI of England, the 10-month old son of the late French regent, England's King Henry V, and grandson of King Charles VI, is proclaimed King Henri II of France. In Bourges, the Dauphin Charles, eldest son of King Charles VI, is proclaimed as King Charles VII.
- November 7 – After being returned to England from France, and then being taken on a two-day journey from Southwark to Temple Bar and thence to London, the body of the late King Henry V is buried at Westminster Abbey.
- November 9 – At the opening of the English Parliament, the House of Commons elects Roger Flower as its speaker.
- December 9 – The Regency Council of the infant King Henry VI of England assembles for the first time with 18 nobles, led by John of Lancaster, Duke of Bedford, the uncle of the King and the brother of the late King Henry V. Because the Duke of Bedford serves primarily in France to command English forces there in the ongoing war, another uncle, Humphrey, Duke of Gloucester, leads the regency most of the time during the King's minority.
- December 18
  - King Charles VII of France marries Marie of Anjou in a ceremony at Bourges.
  - As the English Parliament closes, the regents for King Henry VI give royal assent to new legislation that has been passed during the 39-day session, including the Irishmen Act setting requirements for "What sort of Irishmen only may come to dwell in England"; the Purveyance Act 1422 ("All the statutes of purveyors shall be proclaimed in every county four times in the year") relating to the royal household's purchase of provisions at a regulated price and the requisitioning of horses and vehicles for royal use; and for "A certain allowance made to those which were retained to serve King Henry V. in his wars")

=== Undated ===
- Ottoman forces overrun the last domains of Constantine II of Bulgaria, who dies in exile at the Serbian court, ending the Bulgarian Empire.
- On the Italian Peninsula, Venice has a population of 84,000, of which 200 men rule the city, while Florence has a population of 40,000, of which 600 men rule the city.

== Births ==
- March 8 – Jacopo Piccolomini-Ammannati, Italian Catholic cardinal (d. 1479)
- June 7 – Federico da Montefeltro, Duke of Urbino (d. 1482)
- October 5 – Catherine, Princess of Asturias, Spanish royal (d. 1424)
- November 27 – Gaston IV, Count of Foix, French nobleman from Bearn (d. 1472)
- November 29 – Thomas Percy, 1st Baron Egremont, English baron (d. 1460)
- date unknown – Abul-Qasim Babur Mirza, Timurid ruler in Khurasan (d. 1457)
- probable – William Caxton, English printer (d. c. 1491)
- approximate – Agnès Sorel, French courtier, mistress of Charles VII of France (d. 1450)

== Deaths ==
- March 9 – Jan Želivský, Hussite priest (executed) (b. 1380)
- July 8 – Michelle of Valois, French princess and duchess consort of Burgundy (b. 1395)
- August 31 – King Henry V of England (b. 1386)
- September 17 – Emperor Constantine II of Bulgaria (b. after 1370)
- October 21 – King Charles VI of France (b. 1368)
- probable – Thomas Walsingham, English chronicler
