= 1435 =

1435 in various calendars
- Gregorian calendar: 1435; MCDXXXV
- Ab urbe condita: 2188
- Armenian calendar: 884; ԹՎ ՊՁԴ
- Assyrian calendar: 6185
- Balinese saka calendar: 1356–1357
- Bengali calendar: 841–842
- Berber calendar: 2385
- English Regnal year: 13 Hen. 6 – 14 Hen. 6
- Buddhist calendar: 1979
- Burmese calendar: 797
- Byzantine calendar: 6943–6944
- Chinese calendar: 甲寅年 (Wood Tiger); 4132 or 3925 — to — 乙卯年 (Wood Rabbit); 4133 or 3926
- Coptic calendar: 1151–1152
- Discordian calendar: 2601
- Ethiopian calendar: 1427–1428
- Hebrew calendar: 5195–5196
- Hindu calendars
- Vikram Samvat: 1491–1492
- Shaka Samvat: 1356–1357
- Kali Yuga: 4535–4536
- Holocene calendar: 11435
- Igbo calendar: 435–436
- Iranian calendar: 813–814
- Islamic calendar: 838–839
- Japanese calendar: Eikyō 7 (永享７年)
- Javanese calendar: 1350–1351
- Julian calendar: 1435; MCDXXXV
- Korean calendar: 3768
- Minguo calendar: 477 before ROC 民前477年
- Nanakshahi calendar: −33
- Thai solar calendar: 1977–1978
- Tibetan calendar: ཤིང་ཕོ་སྟག་ལོ་ (male Wood-Tiger); 1561 or 1180 or 408 — to — ཤིང་མོ་ཡོས་ལོ་ (female Wood-Hare); 1562 or 1181 or 409

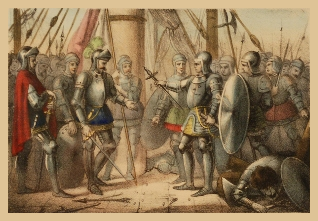
August 5: Spain's King Alfonso V of Aragon is taken prisoner by the Navy of Milan after surrendering at the Battle of Ponza.

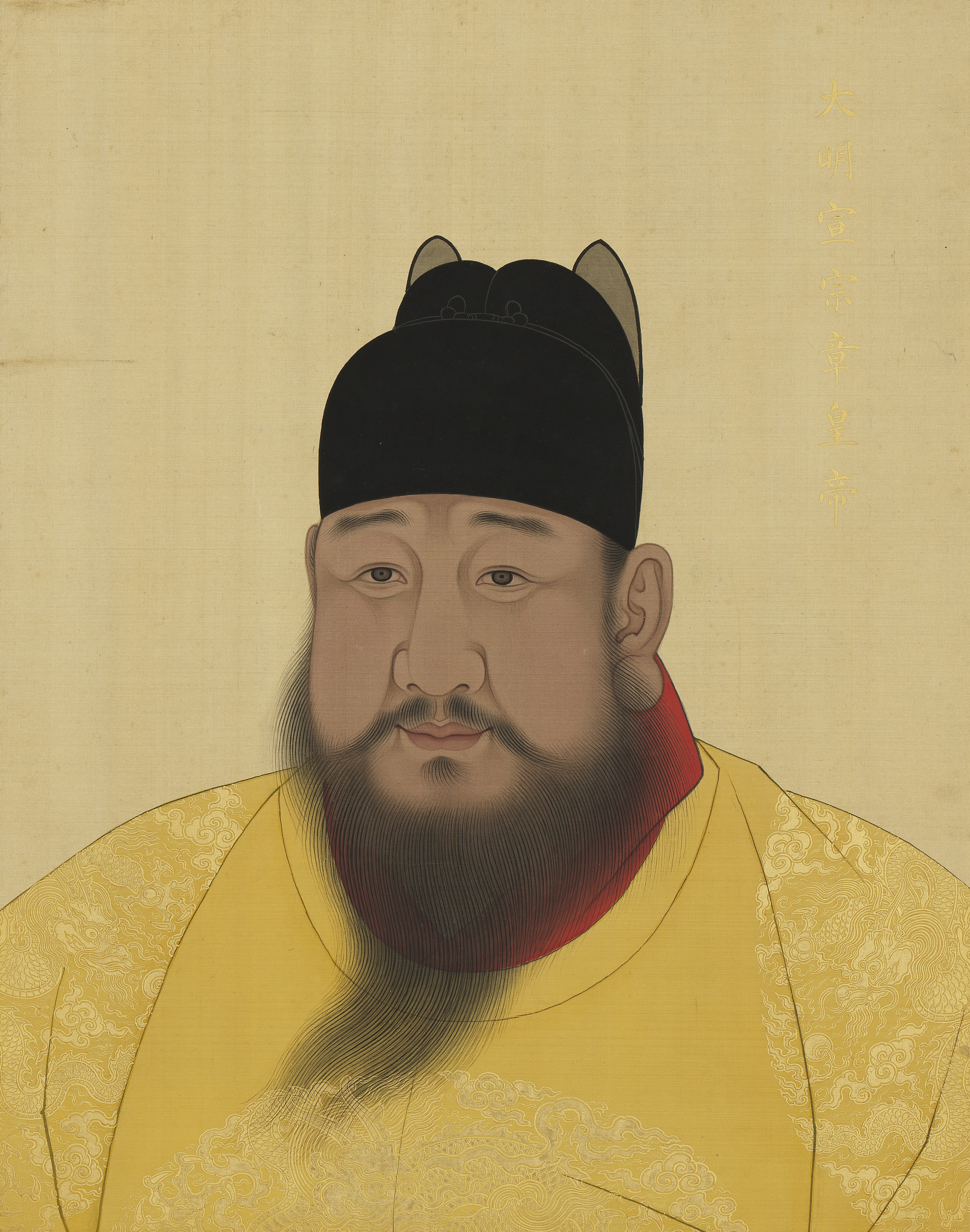
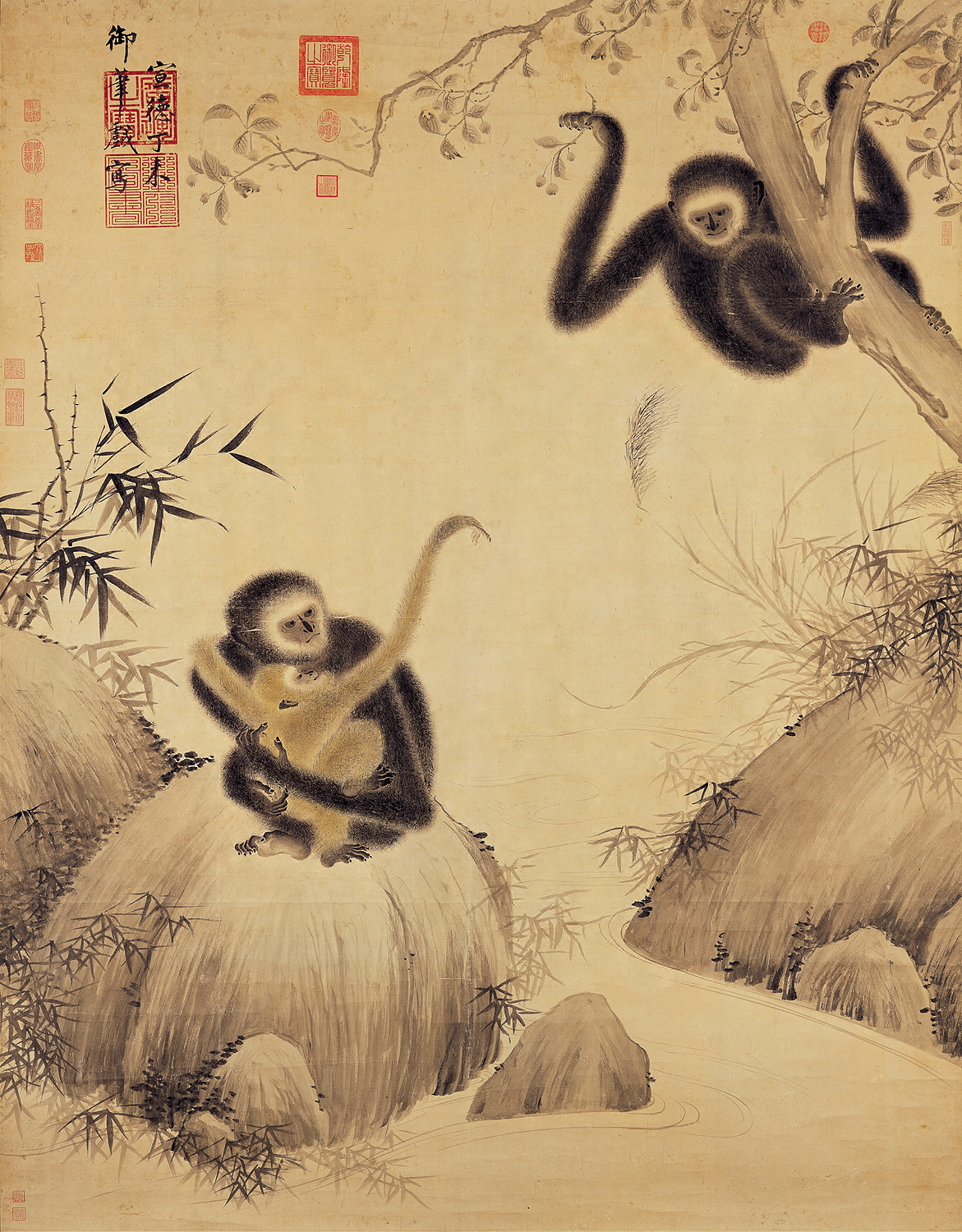
January 31: China's Xuande Emperor, Xuanzong, the only Ming emperor "who displayed genuine artistic talent" dies after a nine-year reign.

Year 1435 (MCDXXXV) was a common year starting on Saturday of the Julian calendar, the 1435th year of the Common Era (CE) and Anno Domini (AD) designations, the 435th year of the 2nd millennium, the 35th year of the 15th century, and the 6th year of the 1430s decade.

== Events ==
=== January–March ===
- January 11 – Sweden's first Riksdag of the Estates is summoned under rebel leader Engelbrekt Engelbrektsson, who is elected rikshövitsman (military commander of the realm), in the absence of a king, on January 13.
- January 13 – Sicut Dudum, a papal bull forbidding the enslavement of the Guanche natives in Canary Islands by the Spanish, is promulgated by Pope Eugene IV.
- January 31 – China's Emperor Xuanzong dies after a nine-year reign, leaving a question of whether his younger brother Zhu Zhanshan, or his 7-year-old son, Crown Prince Zhu Qizhen, should be the successor.
- February 2 – The Kingdom of Naples passes to René of Anjou.
- February 7 – Prince Zhu Qizhen is formally enthroned as the Emperor Yingzong of Ming dynasty China at the age of 8, although his grandmother, the Empress Chengxiaozhao, effectively rules the Empire in his name. The accession of Yingzong begins the Zhengtong Era.–
- March 8 – Prince Zhu Qiyu, who will become the Emperor of China in 1449, is appointed as the Prince of Cheng in the name of the Emperor Yingzong of Ming.
- March 15 – Stjepan Vukčić Kosača becomes the new Grand Duke of Bosnia upon the death of his uncle, Sandalj Hranić.

=== April–June ===
- April 13 – In Germany, Frederick II, Elector of Brandenburg becomes the direct administrator of the Duchy of Pomerania-Stettin upon the death of Casmir V, and acts as regent for Casimir's 8-year-old son, Joachim of Griffin.
- May 8 – The German city of Speyer sets a six-month deadline for its Jewish community to leave, as the council passes a decree declaring that "The council is compelled to banish the Jews, but it has no designs upon their lives or their property. It only revokes their rights of citizenship and of settlement. Until November 11 they are at liberty to go whither they please with all their property, and in the meantime they may make final disposition of their business affairs."
- May 9 – The French Army, led by Jean Poton de Xaintrailles and Étienne de Vignolles ("La Hire") wins the Battle of Gerberoy, despite being outnumbered 3 to 1 by the English Army under John FitzAlan. the French lose no more than 30 soldiers while the English lose over 1,000, including FitzAlan, who is fatally wounded and died on June 12.
- June 1 – The Siege of Paris begins as the French royalists of King Charles VII attempt to retake control of the French capital, defended by the supporters of England's King Henry VI. The siege lasts for 10 months but Paris is surrendered to the royalists on April 17.

=== July–September ===
- July 5 – The regency for King Henry VI summons the members of the English Parliament, directing them to assemble at Westminster on October 10.
- July 17 – Peace of Vordingborg is signed, ending the war between the Hanseatic League of German cities (Hamburg, Lübeck, Lüneburg, Rostock, Stralsund and Wismar) and the Scandinavian Kalmar Union of Denmark and Sweden. King Eric VII of Denmark and Adolph VIII, Count of Holstein sign, along with Hein Hoyer, representing the League, at Vordingborg Castle. Denmark cedes the Duchy of Schleswig to Holstein and agrees to stop interfering with the League, to end ten years of war.
- August 4 – The Battle of Podraga is fought to a draw between the two claimants to the throne of Moldavia, Iliaș and Stephen II, sons of the late voivode Alexander the Good, begin joint rule of Moldavia after intervention by the King of Poland.
- August 5 – In the Battle of Ponza, the navy of the Duchy of Milan decisively defeats King Alfonso V of Aragon who is captured.
- September 1 – In the Battle of Wiłkomierz, Grand Duke Sigismund Kęstutaitis decisively defeats his predecessor, Švitrigaila, in the decisive battle of the civil war in the Grand Duchy of Lithuania.
- September 21 – The Treaty of Arras between Charles VII of France and Philip III of Burgundy ends the English-Burgundian alliance.

=== October–December ===
- October 10 – As the English Parliament opens, the English House of Commons elects John Tyrrell as its speaker.
- October 14 – Eric of Pomerania is reinstated as king of Sweden, only briefly, however, he is once again deposed in January of the following year.
- November 16 – The French port of Dieppe, occupied by the English Army since its capture in 1420, is retaken by French royalists led by Charles Desmarais and Pierre de Rieux.
- December 4 – The Livonian Confederation, with a capital at Valka (now on the border of Latvia and Lithuania) is formed by an agreement signed at Valka by the Archbishop of Riga; Courland; the Dorpat; the Ösel–Wiek and bishops of Courland, Dorpat, Ösel-Wiek and Reval; the representatives of the Livonian Order and its vassals; and the deputies of Riga, Reval and Dorpat city municipal councils.
- December 23 – As the English Parliament closes, King Henry VI's regents give royal assent to new legislation, including the Safe Conducts Act 1435, the Wools and Fells Act (directing that wool not be exported from England to any other location except Calais), and the Alien Goods Act (subtitled "Merchandises taken in Ships of the King's Enemies, though belonging to Foreigners in Amity with the King, shall not be restored")
- December 31 – The Peace of Brześć Kujawski is signed by representatives of the State of the Teutonic Order to make peace with the Kingdom of Poland and the Grand Duchy of Lithuania to end the Polish–Teutonic War, with the Teutonic Order agreeing to end its support of the former Grand Duke Svitrigaila and to not interfere further with Polish and Lithuanian affairs.

=== Date unknown ===
- Francis of Paola founds the Order of the Minims in Italy.
- China returns to a policy of isolation.
- Gil Eanes and Afonso Gonçalves Baldaia explore the coast of Africa, as far as the Angra dos Ruivos (in modern-day Western Sahara).
- Enea Piccolomini, the future Pope Pius II, is sent by Cardinal Albergati on a secret mission to Scotland and Northern England.

== Births ==
- January 20 – Ashikaga Yoshimasa, shōgun (d. 1490)
- February 1 – Amadeus IX, Duke of Savoy (d. 1472)
- April 8 – John Clifford, 9th Baron de Clifford, English noble (d. 1461)
- April 16 – Jan II the Mad, Duke of Żagań (1439–1449 and 1461–1468 and again in 1472) (d. 1504)
- May 4 – Joan of France, Duchess of Bourbon, French princess (d. 1482)
- October 24 – Andrea della Robbia, Italian artist (d. 1525)
- date unknown
  - Yoshida Kanetomo, Shinto priest (d. 1511)
  - Jean Molinet, French poet and chronicler (d. 1507)
  - Kim Si-sŭp, Korean scholar and author (d. 1493)
  - Sophie of Pomerania, Duchess of Pomerania (d. 1497)
  - Thomas Stanley, 1st Earl of Derby (d. 1504)
- probable
  - Johannes Tinctoris, Flemish music theorist and composer (approximate date; d. 1511)
  - Andrea del Verrocchio, Florentine sculptor (approximate date; d. 1488)

== Deaths ==
- January 31 – Xuande Emperor of China (b. 1399)
- February 2 – Queen Joanna II of Naples (b. 1371)
- March 27 – Spytek z Tarnowa i Jarosławia, Polish nobleman
- June 12 – John FitzAlan, 14th Earl of Arundel, English military leader (b. 1408)
- September 9 – Sir Robert Harling, English knight under the Duke of Bedford
- September 14 – John of Lancaster, 1st Duke of Bedford, regent of England (b. 1389)
- September 24 – Isabeau of Bavaria, queen of Charles VI of France
- September 27 – Savvatiy, Russian monastery founder
- October 9 – Paweł Włodkowic, Polish scholar (b. 1370)
- October 13 – Hermann II of Celje, Ban of Croatia
- December 30 – Bonne of Berry, Regent of Savoy (b. 1362)
- date unknown – Abd al-Qadir Maraghi, musician and artist
