= 1434 =

1434 in various calendars
Gregorian calendar	1434; MCDXXXIV
Ab urbe condita	2187
Armenian calendar	883; ԹՎ ՊՁԳ
Assyrian calendar	6184
Balinese saka calendar	1355–1356
Bengali calendar	840–841
Berber calendar	2384
English Regnal year	12 Hen. 6 – 13 Hen. 6
Buddhist calendar	1978
Burmese calendar	796
Byzantine calendar	6942–6943
Chinese calendar	癸丑年 (Water Ox); 4131 or 3924 — to — 甲寅年 (Wood Tiger); 4132 or 3925
Coptic calendar	1150–1151
Discordian calendar	2600
Ethiopian calendar	1426–1427
Hebrew calendar	5194–5195
- Hindu calendars
Vikram Samvat	1490–1491
Shaka Samvat	1355–1356
Kali Yuga	4534–4535
Holocene calendar	11434
Igbo calendar	434–435
Iranian calendar	812–813
Islamic calendar	837–838
Japanese calendar	Eikyō 6 (永享６年)
Javanese calendar	1349–1350
Julian calendar	1434; MCDXXXIV
Korean calendar	3767
Minguo calendar	478 before ROC 民前478年
Nanakshahi calendar	−34
Thai solar calendar	1976–1977
Tibetan calendar	ཆུ་མོ་གླང་ལོ་ (female Water-Ox); 1560 or 1179 or 407 — to — ཤིང་ཕོ་སྟག་ལོ་ (male Wood-Tiger); 1561 or 1180 or 408

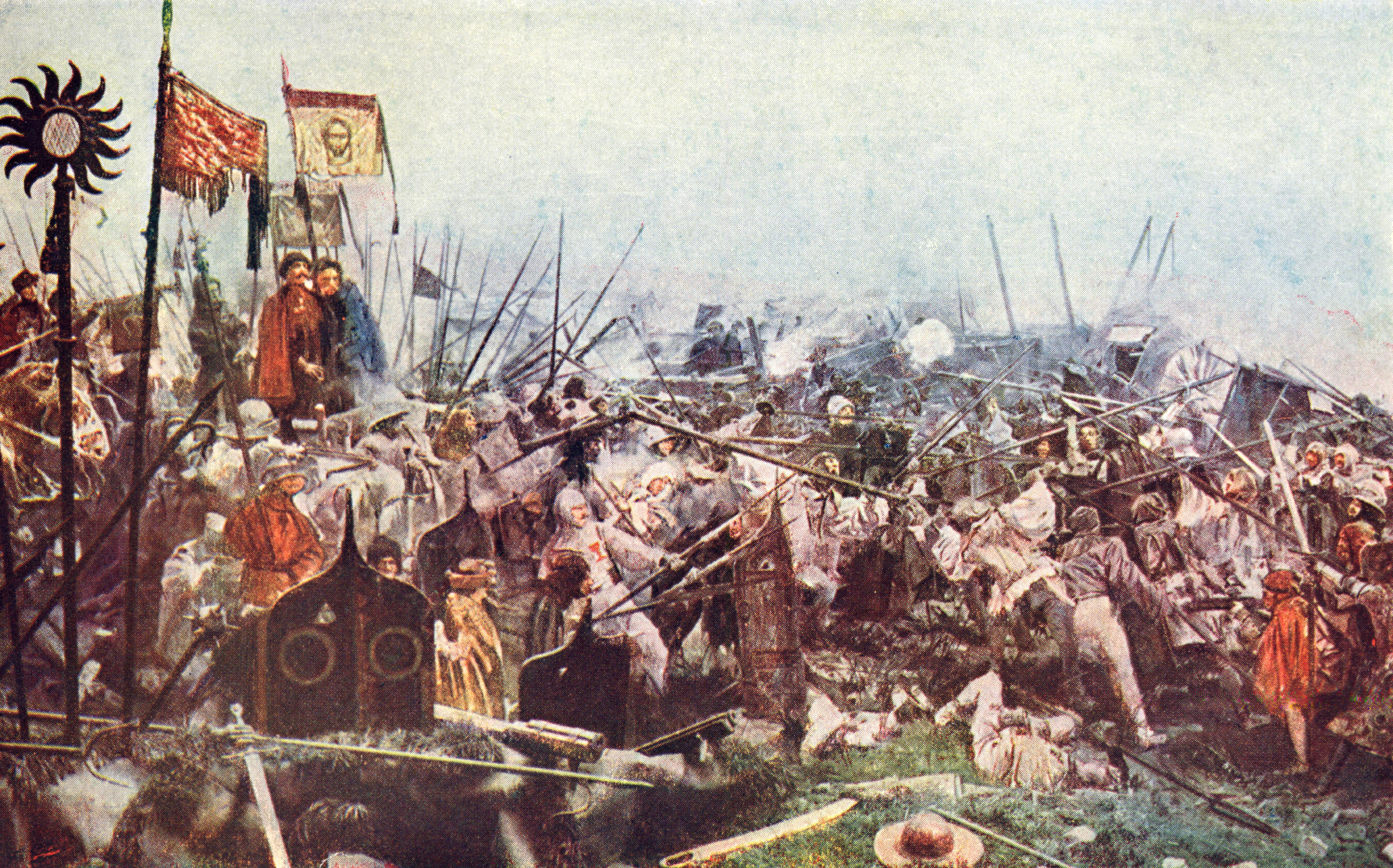
May 30 – Battle of Lipany is fought and ends the Hussite Wars.

Year 1434 (MCDXXXIV) was a common year starting on Friday of the Julian calendar.

== Events ==
=== January–March ===
- January 9 – (Rajab 9, 837 AH) King Alfonso V of Aragon ruler of the Kingdom of Sicily as well, contracts with tapestry weaver Guillem d'Uxelles to Flanders to begin learning the Flemish methods to be duplicated in Spain, beginning the "Hispano-Flemish" style.
- February 19 – In India, Mubarak Shah II, the Sultan of Delhi, is assassinated. His nephew, Muhammad Shah IV becomes the new Sultan.
- March 16 – Muscovite War of Succession: Yury of Zvenigorod defeats his nephew, Vasily II, Grand Prince of Moscow, in a battle at Rostov, about 125 miles (201 km) from Moscow.
- March 31 – Yury of Zvenigorod marches into Moscow with his army and plunders Vasily II's treasury.

=== April–June ===
- April 14 – The foundation stone of Nantes Cathedral in Nantes, Brittany, is laid.
- May 30 – Hussite Wars – Battle of Lipany: The Catholics and Utraquists defeat the Taborites, ending the Hussite Wars.
- June 20 – Zara Yaqob becomes Emperor of Ethiopia.
- June 24 – Iron mine owner Engelbrekt Engelbrektsson begins the Engelbrekt rebellion in Sweden against King Erik, starting with an attack against the town of Borlänge, followed by Köpingehus, burning down offices there and then marching on towards Västerås.

=== July–September ===
- July 5– Slightly more than three months after claiming the Grand Principality of Moscow, Yury of Zvenigorod dies suddenly at the age of 59 and is succeeded by his son, Vasily Kosoy.
- July 10– In the Kingdom of León in Spain, Suero de Quiñones and his companions stage the Passo Honroso, at the bridge across the Órbigo River near Santiago de Compostela. Any knight attempting to cross the bridge is challenged to a joust by the Quiñones knights. The challenge continues for the next 30 days.
- July 25 – The coronation of Wladyslaw III as King of Poland takes place at the Wawel Cathedral in Kraków.
- August 9 – After fighting 166 jousts, and sustaining injuries over a month, Quiñones and his men end the Passo Honroso.
- August 16 – King Eric of Pomerania is deposed from the Swedish throne at a meeting in Vadstena, though he still retains power in Denmark and Norway.
- August – Portuguese explorer Gil Eanes and his crew sail around the dangerous Cape Bojador of North Africa (off of Western Sahara) and survive, becoming the first Europeans to make the voyage and ending the legends about what lies on the other side of the "Dark Sea". The achievement is a breakthrough in trade between Europe and Asia.
- September 29 – Pope Eugene IV issues the papal bull Regimini gregis, condemning the enslavement by the Kingdom of Castile of the Guanches, the indigenous people of the Canary Islands. An order to free the slaves follows three months later.

=== October–December ===
- October 6 – Cosimo de' Medici returns to Florence, one year after being exiled by the Albizzi and Strozzi faction.
- October 21 – The University of Catania is founded in Italy.
- November 12 –
  - René of Anjou becomes the new Count of Provence and Duke of Anjou, as well as a claimant to the title of King of Naples, upon the death of his brother, Louis III.
  - Bishop Nils Ragvaldsson of Sweden delivers a speech at the Council of Basel, arguing the Kingdom of Sweden and its monarch, Eric of Pomerania deserve senior rank over the Spanish delegation.
- December 17 – Pope Eugene IV issues the papal bull Creator Omnium, directing the freedom of the Canary Island slaves within 15 days after the bull is received.

=== Date unknown ===
- Jan van Eyck paints the Arnolfini Portrait.
- In Ming Dynasty China, a long episode of drought, flood, locust infestation, and famine cripple agriculture and commerce in areas throughout the country, until 1448.

== Births ==
- January 7 – Adolf, Duke of Bavaria (d. 1441)
- March 12 – William III, Count of Henneberg-Schleusingen (d. 1480)
- March 19 – Ashikaga Yoshikatsu, Japanese shōgun (d. 1443)
- March 25 – Eustochia Smeralda Calafato, Italian saint (d. 1485)
- June 13 – Cristoforo della Rovere, Roman Catholic cardinal (d. 1478)
- September 18 – Eleanor of Portugal, Holy Roman Empress (d. 1467)
- September 23 – Yolande of Valois, Duchess consort of Savoy (d. 1478)
- December 28 – Antonio Grimani, Italian admiral (d. 1523)
- probable
  - Antoinette de Maignelais, mistress of Charles VII of France (d. 1474)
  - Isabella of Bourbon, Burgundian countess, spouse of Charles the Bold (d. 1465)
  - Matteo Maria Boiardo, Italian poet (d. 1494)
  - Kano Masanobu, Japanese painter (d. 1530)

== Deaths ==
- January – John I, Duke of Bourbon (b. 1381)
- April 20 – Alexandra of Lithuania, Duchess of Masovia
- May 30 – Prokop the Great, Hussite general (b. 1380)
- June – Amda Iyasus, Emperor of Ethiopia
- June 1 – King Wladislaus II of Poland (age unknown)
- June 5 – Yuri IV, Russian grand prince (b. 1374)
- November 12 – King Louis III of Anjou (b. 1403)
