= 1427 =

1427 in various calendars
- Gregorian calendar: 1427; MCDXXVII
- Ab urbe condita: 2180
- Armenian calendar: 876; ԹՎ ՊՀԶ
- Assyrian calendar: 6177
- Balinese saka calendar: 1348–1349
- Bengali calendar: 833–834
- Berber calendar: 2377
- English Regnal year: 5 Hen. 6 – 6 Hen. 6
- Buddhist calendar: 1971
- Burmese calendar: 789
- Byzantine calendar: 6935–6936
- Chinese calendar: 丙午年 (Fire Horse); 4124 or 3917 — to — 丁未年 (Fire Goat); 4125 or 3918
- Coptic calendar: 1143–1144
- Discordian calendar: 2593
- Ethiopian calendar: 1419–1420
- Hebrew calendar: 5187–5188
- Hindu calendars
- Vikram Samvat: 1483–1484
- Shaka Samvat: 1348–1349
- Kali Yuga: 4527–4528
- Holocene calendar: 11427
- Igbo calendar: 427–428
- Iranian calendar: 805–806
- Islamic calendar: 830–831
- Japanese calendar: Ōei 34 (応永３４年)
- Javanese calendar: 1342–1343
- Julian calendar: 1427; MCDXXVII
- Korean calendar: 3760
- Minguo calendar: 485 before ROC 民前485年
- Nanakshahi calendar: −41
- Thai solar calendar: 1969–1970
- Tibetan calendar: མེ་ཕོ་རྟ་ལོ་ (male Fire-Horse); 1553 or 1172 or 400 — to — མེ་མོ་ལུག་ལོ་ (female Fire-Sheep); 1554 or 1173 or 401

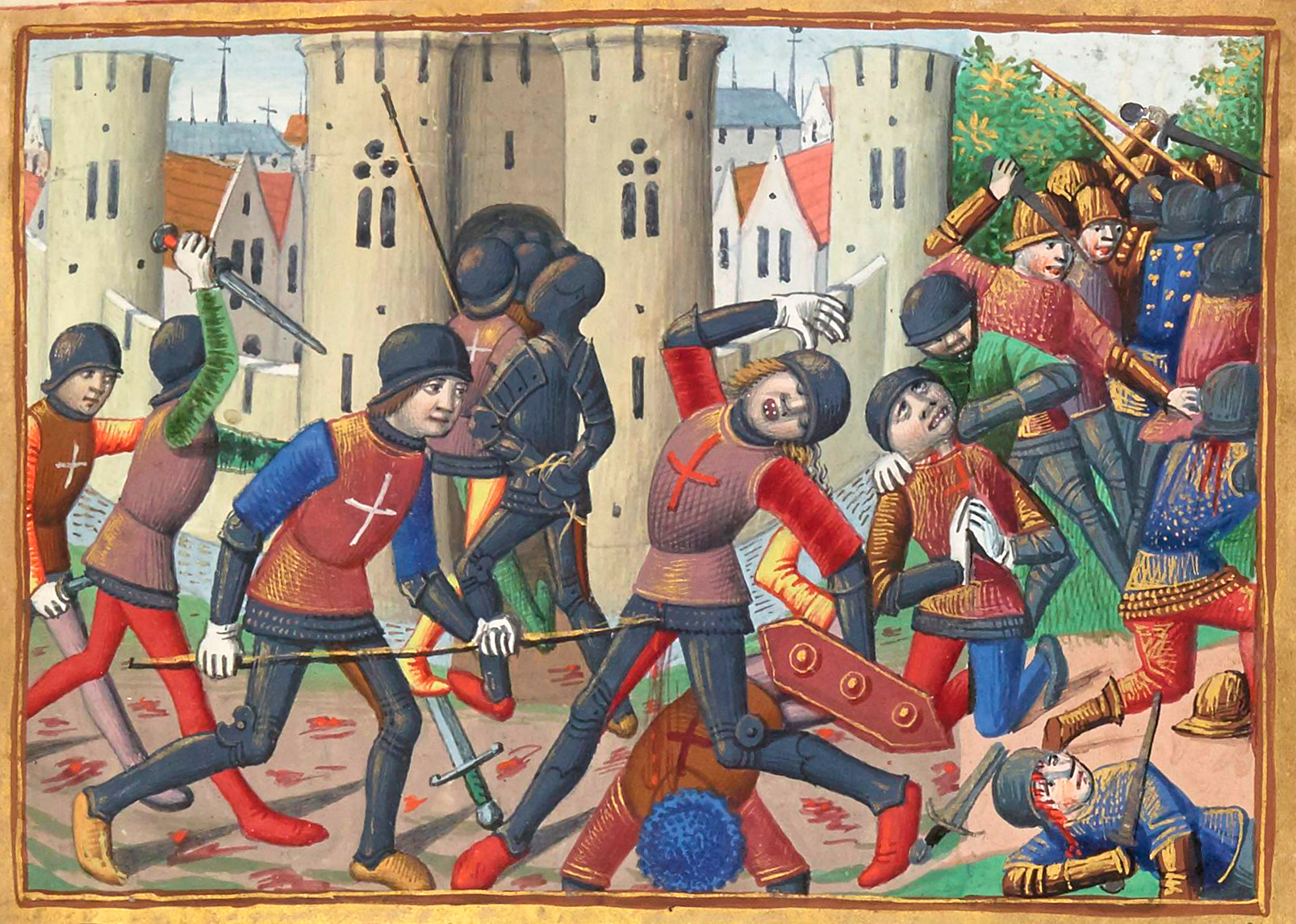
September 5: English Army troops suffer disastrous defeat during attempt to besiege Montargis

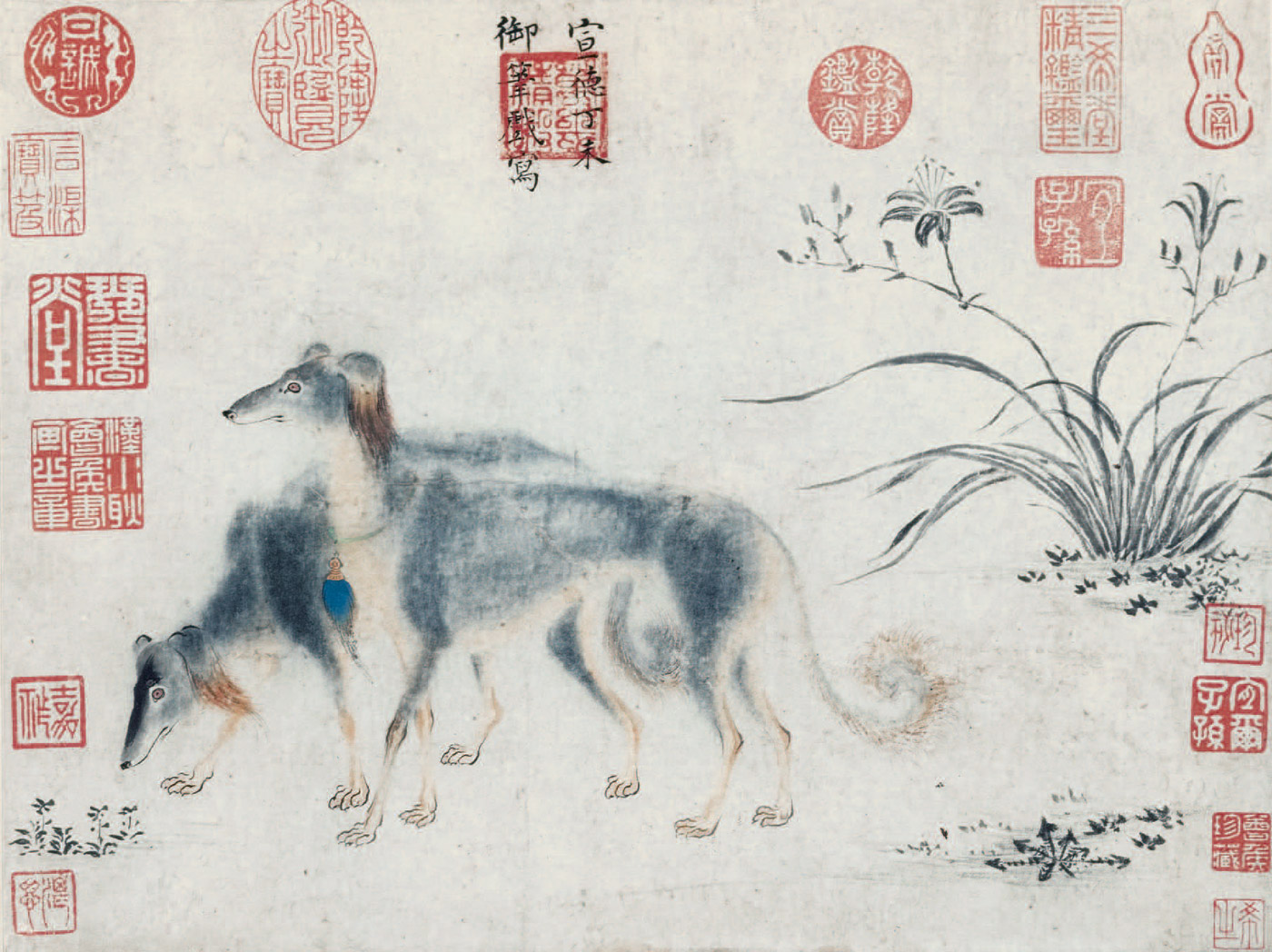
The Ming dynasty Emperor Xuanzong paints a picture of his dogs.

Year 1427 (MCDXXVII) was a common year starting on Wednesday of the Julian calendar.

== Events ==
=== January–June ===
- January 16 – The papacy of Pope Gabriel V of Alexandria, leader of the Coptic Orthodox Church in Egypt, ends with his death after a reign of more than 17 years.
- January – Radu II of Wallachia resumes the throne of Wallachia for the fourth time, but a seven-year struggle for it ends in March when he is defeated in battle, and probably killed, by Dan II, who resumes the throne for a fifth term.
- February 23 – In Spain, the first tremors are felt in the Principality of Catalonia of what will become a devastating 6.7 magnitude earthquake that will happen less than a year later, on February 2, 1428.
- March 29 – In Vietnam, the Ming dynasty China army invades a second time, bringing 120,000 reinforcement troops led by General Mu Sheng to crush the Lam Sơn uprising.

=== April–June ===
- April 22 – In France, Edmund Beaufort, 2nd Duke of Somerset, is granted the control of the county of Mortain in Normandy by the Duke of Bedford, Regent for King Henry VI in France, as a reward for his military service during the war against the French.
- May 11 (16 Pashons, 1143 AM) – At Alexandria, Farag El-Maksi is elected as the new Patriarch of the Coptic Orthodox Christians and takes the regnal name of Pope John XI.
- June 7 – Pope Martin V orders the Roman Catholic bishops of Portro and Alba to work on driving the Fraticelli faction of the Franciscan Order from Italy.
- June 16 – John, Margrave of Brandenburg-Kulmbach ("the Alchemist", of the Hohenzollern family), signs a peace agreement with the dukes of the various Pomeranian duchies at the Brandenburg city of Templin, ending the latest Pomeranian-Brandenburg conflict.
- June 27 – John III, Duke of Mecklenburg-Stargard, is released from imprisonment after swearing an oath of allegiance to John, Margrave of Brandenburg.

=== July–September ===
- July 15 – The Siege of Montargis is started in France by 1,000 Englishmen led by the Earl of Warwick and lasts for seven weeks.
- July 19 – Stefan Lazarević, ruler of the Serbian Despotate, dies at Belgrade and is succeeded by his nephew, Đurađ Branković.
- August 4 – Hussite Wars: Battle of Tachov – The Hussites decisively beat the crusader armies, ending the Fourth Anti-Hussite Crusade.
- August 17 – The first band of Gypsies visits Paris, according to an account of the citizens of Paris.

=== October–December ===
- September 5 – A French Army relief force of 1,600 soldiers, led by Jean de Dunois, ends the siege of Montargis by luring the English Army into a trap. The Montargis defenders open the city gates and the English are attacked from two sides, losing more than 1,000 men and all of their artillery.
- September 29 – Lam Sơn uprising: China's General Liu Sheng arrives at China's border with Vietnam where a meeting is held with rebel leader Lê Lợi, who proposes settling the war by recognizing Tran Cao's rule as King of Đại Việt. The proposal is a pretext for Liu Sheng's army being lured into an ambush that soon follows, with 70,000 Chinese troops killed.
- October 13 –
  - Lincoln College, a constituent college of the University of Oxford in England, is founded by the Bishop of Lincoln.
  - The English Parliament assembles at Westminster after being summoned on July 15 by England's Regency Council. John Tyrrell is elected as Speaker of the House of Commons.
- November 12 – To avoid further destruction of the Chinese army, General Wang Tong begins withdrawing troops from northern Vietnam's Jiaozhi region, having accepted a proposal by Vietnam without the approval of China's Xuande Emperor. The Emperor is informed of the proposal and agrees on November 20 to accept terms of peace.
- December 29 – Victorious in the Lam Sơn uprising, Đại Việt (Vietnam) succeeds in forcing the withdrawal of Chinese troops from its territory as China's General Wang Tong and Vietnam's General Nguyễn Trãi agree to terms of disarmament and repatriation of 86,640 Ming Chinese prisoners in return for Chinese withdrawal.

=== Date unknown ===
- Minrekyansa becomes King of Ava (ancient Myanmar).
- The Conflict of Druimnacour occurs in Sutherland, Scotland.
- The first witch hunts begin, in Switzerland.
- The Celestine Order is established in France.
- The Celebration of Sant Jordi (Saint George) begins in Catalonia (he will later become its patron saint).
- Bremen is expelled from the Hanseatic League.
- Diogo de Silves, Portuguese navigator, discovers seven islands of the Azores archipelago.
- Battle of the Echinades: A Byzantine fleet defeats the fleet of Carlo I Tocco.
- Itzcoatl becomes the 4th Tlatoani of Tenochtitlan, after his nephew Chimalpopoca is killed by the Maxtla, at Azcapotzalco.
- Bhaktapur Royal Palace in Nepal is built by King Yaksa Malla.

== Births ==
- February 27 – Ruprecht, Archbishop of Cologne (d. 1480)
- May 8 – John Tiptoft, 1st Earl of Worcester, Lord High Treasurer (d. 1470)
- May 29 – Françoise d'Amboise, duchess consort of Brittany, co-founder of the first monastery of the Carmelites in France (d. 1485)
- June 22 – Lucrezia Tornabuoni, Italian writer, adviser and spouse of Piero di Cosimo de' Medici (d. 1482)
- September 9 – Thomas de Ros, 9th Baron de Ros, English politician (d. 1464)
- October 26 – Archduke Sigismund of Austria (d. 1496)
- November 24 – John Stafford, 1st Earl of Wiltshire (d. 1473)
- November 29 – Zhengtong Emperor of China (d. 1464)
- November 30 – Casimir IV Jagiellon, King of Poland (d. 1492)
- date unknown – Shen Zhou, Chinese painter (d. 1509)

== Deaths ==
- April 17 – John IV of Brabant (b. 1403)
- May 7 – Thomas la Warr, 5th Baron De La Warr, English churchman
- May 28 – Henry IV, Count of Holstein-Rendsburg (b. 1397)
- July 19 – Stefan Lazarević, Despot of Serbia (b. 1377)
- date unknown
  - Chimalpopoca, Aztec Tlatoani (ruler) of Tenochtitlán (b. 1397)
  - Qu You, Chinese novelist (b. 1341)
- probable
  - Jehuda Cresques, Catalan cartographer (b. 1350)
  - Gentile da Fabriano, Italian painter
  - Radu II Prasnaglava, ruler of Wallachia, probably killed in or after a lost battle
