= 1428 =

1428 in various calendars
- Gregorian calendar: 1428; MCDXXVIII
- Ab urbe condita: 2181
- Armenian calendar: 877; ԹՎ ՊՀԷ
- Assyrian calendar: 6178
- Balinese saka calendar: 1349–1350
- Bengali calendar: 834–835
- Berber calendar: 2378
- English Regnal year: 6 Hen. 6 – 7 Hen. 6
- Buddhist calendar: 1972
- Burmese calendar: 790
- Byzantine calendar: 6936–6937
- Chinese calendar: 丁未年 (Fire Goat); 4125 or 3918 — to — 戊申年 (Earth Monkey); 4126 or 3919
- Coptic calendar: 1144–1145
- Discordian calendar: 2594
- Ethiopian calendar: 1420–1421
- Hebrew calendar: 5188–5189
- Hindu calendars
- Vikram Samvat: 1484–1485
- Shaka Samvat: 1349–1350
- Kali Yuga: 4528–4529
- Holocene calendar: 11428
- Igbo calendar: 428–429
- Iranian calendar: 806–807
- Islamic calendar: 831–832
- Japanese calendar: Ōei 35 / Shocho 1 (正長元年)
- Javanese calendar: 1343–1344
- Julian calendar: 1428; MCDXXVIII
- Korean calendar: 3761
- Minguo calendar: 484 before ROC 民前484年
- Nanakshahi calendar: −40
- Thai solar calendar: 1970–1971
- Tibetan calendar: མེ་མོ་ལུག་ལོ་ (female Fire-Sheep); 1554 or 1173 or 401 — to — ས་ཕོ་སྤྲེ་ལོ་ (male Earth-Monkey); 1555 or 1174 or 402

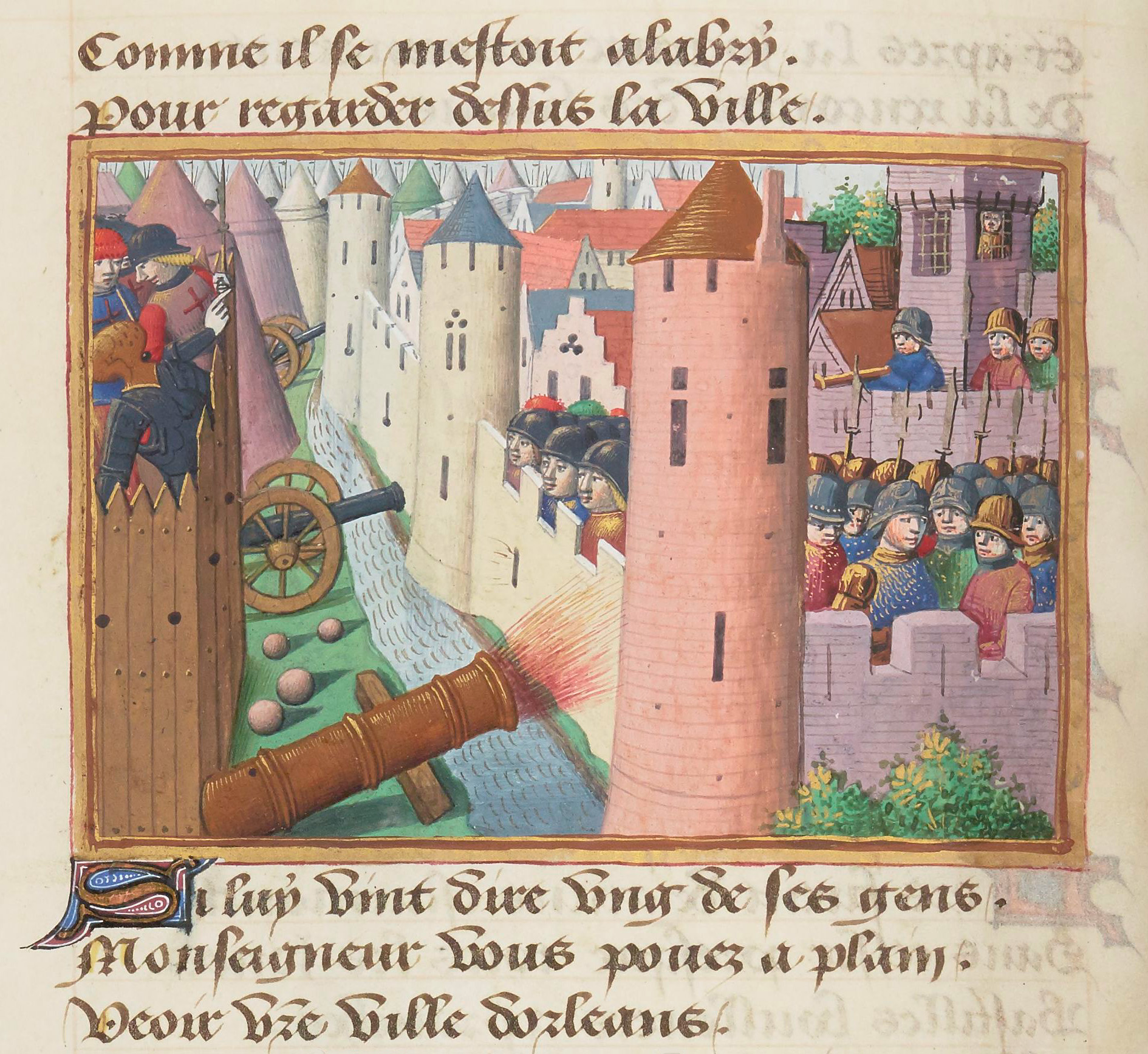
October 17, 1428: England begins bombardment of the walls of the French city of Orleans on sixth day of siege.

Year 1428 (MCDXXVIII) was a leap year starting on Thursday of the Julian calendar.

== Events ==
=== January–March ===
- January 4 – Friedrich II of the House of Wettin, nicknamed "Friedrich, der Sanftmütige" ("Frederick the Gentle") becomes the new Elector of Saxony at the age of 15, upon the death of his father "Frederick the Warlike".
- February 2 – The Catalonia earthquake takes place in the Catalonian region of Spain during Candlemas, estimated later at 6.5 magnitude, with extreme damage to the city of Roussillon and to the village of Queralbs. The quake collapses a church in Puigcerdà, killing more than 100 people, and 1,000 overall.
- February 20 – Zhu Qizhen, son of China's Emperor Xuanzong of Ming, is named as the Crown Prince of Ming dynasty China by his father. He will become the Emperor Yingzong of Ming in 1435.
- March 25 –
  - China's Emperor Xuanzong of Ming directs Admiral Zheng He to oversee the rebuilding of the Porcelain Tower of Nanjing. The construction of the temple was completed in 1431.
  - The Fifth Parliament of King Henry VI of England closes its session, as the King grants royal assent to the Commissioners of Sewers Act 1427, the Wages of Artificers Act granting the justices of peace power to "assign the wages of artificers and workmen by proclamation", and the Assizes Act and the Exigent on Indictment Act which both set statutes of limitation on certain proceedings.
- March 27 – Casimir V, Duke of Pomerania becomes the sole ruler of Pomerania-Stettin in Germany upon the death of his brother, Otto II, after the two had ruled jointly since 1413.

=== April–June ===
- April 6 – Dano-Hanseatic War (1426–1435): The bombardment of Copenhagen, capital of Denmark, by ships of the Northern German Hanseatic League takes place and is repelled by the Danish Navy.
- April 19 – A truce is reached to halt the Wars in Lombardy six months after the Venetian Army destroyed the Milanese town of Maclodio on October 11. The Duchy of Milan cedes the city of Bergamo to the Republic of Venice and the war halts for two years.
- April 22 – After an attack by the Ottoman Empire on Venetian outposts on the Greek island of Euboea, the Republic of Venice, presided over by the Doge Francesco Foscari, authorizes Admiral Andrea Mocenigo to organize 15 warships to hunt and destroy the Ottoman raiders.
- April 29 – The coronation of the Vietnamese rebel leader Le Loi as the King of Dai Viet takes place in Hanoi (at the time referred to as Thang Long). King Le Loi renames the Viet capital as "Dong Kinh".
- May 13 – Joan of Arc makes her first attempt to reach the Armagnac court at Chinon, arriving at Vaucouleurs speaking to Robert de Baudricourt, captain of the royal garrison, and tells him that God told her in a vision that she had a mission to help restore the Dauphin Charles to the throne. Baudricourt initially declines her request to be given an escort to visit Charles in person.
- June 3 – Dan II leads an army against the Ottomans at Golubac Fortress, obtaining a treaty that will allow him a semi-peaceful rule in Wallachia, until 1432.
- June 15 – In second bombardment of Copenhagen by the Hanseatic League, all but three of the Danish Navy's ships are destroyed by the Hanseatic cannons, capable of shooting artillery at greater distances than Denmark is technologically capable of achieving.

=== July–September ===
- July 3 – The Treaty of Delft is signed by the Countess Jacqueline of Holland as a surrender to Philip, Duke of Burgundy to end the siege of Gouda by the Cod Forces against Holland, Zeeland and Hainaut during the Hook and Cod Wars. Under the pact, Jacqueline retains her title and nominal powers, but Philip administers the government and the right to inherit control.
- July 12 – King James I of Scotland gives royal assent to the Oath by Queen Act 1428 (De juramento prestando Domine Regine) passed by the Parliament of Scotland at Perth.
- August 7 – The Valais witch trials begin in Swiss Savoy.
- August 30 – (20th day of the 7th month of Shōchō 1) Japan's Emperor Shōkō dies at the age of 27.
- September 7 – (29th day of the 7th month of Shōchō 1) Emperor Go-Hanazono, the 10-year old third cousin of the late Emperor Shoko accedes to the throne of Japan.

=== October–December ===
- October 12 – English forces under Thomas Montacute, 4th Earl of Salisbury, besiege Orléans. Jean de Dunois, the Bastard of Orléans, commands the defenders. Bombardment starts on October 17 and troops attempt an assault on
- October 21 – Siege of Orléans: After four days of bombardment, English troops attempt an assault on the boulevart of the city walls but the French defenders hold the attackers back with missile fire, rope nets, scalding oil, hot coals and quicklime. p.383
- October 24 – Thomas Montacute, 4th Earl of Salisbury, is mortally wounded in an unsuccessful assault on Orléans. He is succeeded in command by William de la Pole, 4th Earl of Suffolk.
- November 11 – The Battle of Kratzau takes place in Bohemia in what is now the city of Chrastava in the Czech Republic, as the Silesian troops of the Bohemian Crown Lands under of the Holy Roman Empire (Upper Lusatia, the duchies of Jawor and Wroclaw, Polenz, Lower Lusatia and the Duchy of Żagań, led by Hans von Polenz, repel an attack by the Sirotci Hussites led by Jan Královec.
- December 2 – The Appenzell Wars come to an end in Switzerland as Frederick VII, Count of Toggenburg and knights of the Order of St. George's Shield defeat the rebel army of the Canton of Appenzell in a battle on the field between Gossau and Herisau. In a truce the next year, Appenzell is forced to repay the back taxes owed to the Abbey of St. Gallbut is relieved from future obligations.
- December 27 – In the Battle of Stary Wielisław (now in Poland), the Hussites are defeated in an attack by the Bohemian forces led by the Silesian Duke John I of Münsterberg (who is killed in the fighting) and Půta III of Častolovice, Governor of Klodzko Land.

=== Date unknown ===
- The Aztec Empire is formed by the triple alliance of the Aztec city-states Tenochtitlán, Texcoco and Tlacopán and defeats Azcapotzalco to win control of the Valley of Mexico. Itzcóatl becomes 1st emperor.
- A serious fire occurs at Baynard's Castle in the City of London, England.
- Lam Sơn uprising: Lê Lợi, founder of the Lê dynasty in Vietnam, liberates Annam (the territory occupied by Ming dynasty China in 1407) and restores the kingdom as Đại Việt.

== Births ==
- February 3 – Helena Palaiologina, Queen of Cyprus (d. 1458)
- April 7 – William Percy, late medieval Bishop of Carlisle (d. 1462)
- May 3 – Pedro González de Mendoza, Spanish cardinal and statesman (d. 1495)
- July 4 – Filippo Strozzi the Elder, Italian banker (d. 1491)
- September 21 – Jingtai Emperor of China (d. 1457)
- November 2 – Yolande, Duchess of Lorraine (d. 1483)
- November 22 – Richard Neville, 16th Earl of Warwick, English nobleman, known as "the Kingmaker" (d. 1471)
- December 4 – Bernard VII, Lord of Lippe (1429–1511) (d. 1511)
- date unknown – Donato Acciaioli, Italian scholar (d. 1478)
  - Maria Ormani, Italian artist, scribe and illuminator
- probable – Didrik Pining, German explorer (approximate date)

== Deaths ==
- January 4 – Frederick I, Elector of Saxony (b. 1370)
- February 3 – Ashikaga Yoshimochi, Japanese shōgun (b. 1386)
- June 12 – Zawisza Czarny, Polish knight and diplomat
- August 27 – John I of Münsterberg, Duke of Ziebice (b. 1370)
- August 30 – Emperor Shōkō, emperor of Japan (b. 1401)
- Autumn – Masaccio, Italian painter (b. 1401)
- November 3 – Thomas Montacute, 4th Earl of Salisbury, English military leader (mortally wounded in battle) (b. 1388)
- November 4 – Sophia of Bavaria, Queen regent of Bohemia (b. 1376)
- date unknown
  - Maxtla, Tepanec ruler of Azcapotzalco
  - Paul of Venice, Catholic theologian
  - Isabella, Countess of Foix, French sovereign (b. 1361)
- probable – John Purvey, English theologian (b. 1353)
