= 1440s =

Decade

The 1440s decade ran from January 1, 1440, to December 31, 1449

== Events ==
=== 1440 ===
==== January–March ====
- January 6 – Ludovico becomes the new Duke of Savoy upon the abdication of his father Amadeus VIII.
- January 8 – Seventeen new Roman Catholic Cardinals are added to the College of Cardinals afer having been appointed by Pope Eugene IV on December 18.
- February 21 – The Prussian Confederation is proposed as an opposition to the Teutonic Knights at a meeting in Elbing by nobles from the cities of Culm, Elbing, Thorn, Danzig, Braunsberg, Königsberg, and Kneiphof, all of which will become part of Poland a little more than 500 years later. The delegates agree to hold a larger meeting on March 14 at Marienwerder.
- February 22 – Four months after the death of King Albert of Hungary, his son, Ladislaus the Posthumous, is born at Komárom (modern-day Komárno in Slovakia) to Albert's widow, Elisabeth, regent for the vacant throne. Elizabeth argues to the Hungarian nobles that Ladislaus should be elected as the rightful successor to King Albert, and that she should serve as the boy's regent.
- February 26 – Ibrahim II becomes the Bey of Candar, a monarchy on the Black Sea that encompasses 10 modern-day Turkish provinces, upon the death of his father, Mubariz al-Din Isfendiyar, in the capital, Sinop.
- February–June – The Praguerie, an uprising by the French nobility against King Charles VII.
- March 8 – Despite the birth of a posthumous son of the late King Albert V, the Hungarian nobles vote to elect King Vladislaus III of Poland as the new King of Hungary.
- March 14 – The Prussian Confederation is formed by 53 nobles and clergy, representing 19 Prussian cities, who meet at Elblag to form an opposition to the Teutonic Knights.
- March 20 – Sigismund Kęstutaitis, the Grand Duke of Lithuania, is assassinated at his residence at the Trakai Peninsula Castle by supporters of his rival, Svitraglia.

==== April–June ====
- April 9 – Christopher of Bavaria is elected King of Denmark.
- April – Ottoman Sultan Murad II begins the siege of Belgrade, at this time part of the Kingdom of Hungary following the conquest of Serbia. The fortress is heavily damaged, but the defenders' use of artillery prevents the Turks from capturing the city, and the siege ends after six months.
- May 4 – Metrophanes II, Bishop of Cyzicus, is appointed by the Byzantine Emperor John VIII Palaiologos as the new Ecumenical Patriarch of Constantinople, leader of the Eastern Orthodox Church, to succeed Joseph II, who had died in 1439.
- May 15 – Elizabeth of Luxembourg, regent for the vacant throne of Hungary, has her infant son, Ladislaus the Posthumous, crowned king at Székesfehérvár with the stolen Crown of Saint Stephen.
- June 29
  - The League of Italian States (Florence, Venice and the Papal States) defeats the army of the Duchy of Milan at the Battle of Anghiari in Tuscany.
  - Casimir IV Jagiellon is proclaimed as the new Grand Duke of Lithuania by the Lithuanian Council of Lords.
  - The Diet of Hungary approves a resolution declaring the coronation of Ladislaus as King of Hungary to be invalid, declaring that "the crowning of kings is always dependent on the will of the kingdom's inhabitants, in whose consent both the effectiveness and the force of the crown reside".

==== July–September ====
- July 11 – John V, Duke of Brittany, signs a neutrality agreement with the Kingdom of England, promising not to give shelter to England's enemies in the ongoing English occupation of western France.
- July 17 – Wladyslaw III, King of Poland and Supreme Duke of Lithuania, is crowned as King László I of Hungary at the Basilica of the Assumption of the Blessed Virgin Mary in Székesfehérvár.
- July 24 – At Basel in Switzerland, Amadeus VIII, Duke of Savoy is crowned as "Pope Felix V" by Roman Catholic cardinals of the Council of Basel who had voted to depose Pope Eugene IV as leader of the Roman Catholic Church. As Felix V, he is designated in Vatican history as the last "antipope". He remains in Basel and never travels to Rome to assume the papacy; in 1449, after the death of Eugene IV, Amadeus assumes an oath of loyalty to Eugene's successor, Pope Nicholas V.
- August 31 – In France, the Siege of Tartas is commenced in Gascony by troops of the Kingdom of England and the English-controlled Duchy of Gascony in an attempt to oust a French supporter of King Charles VII, Charles II d'Albret, who has taken control of Tartas. The siege lasts for almost two years before being abandoned by the English.
- September 10 – A rebellion in Hungary, instigated by Ladislaus Garai against the newly elected King Laszlo (who is also king of Poland), is ended when Garai's army is annihilated in a battle at Bátaszék by the troops of General János Hunyadi and of Nicholas of Ilok, ruler of Croatia.
- September 12 – Eton College, one of the most famous boarding schools for boys in England, is founded by King Henry VI as "Kynge's College of Our Ladye of Eton besyde Windesore".
- September 13
  - Christopher of Bavaria, King Christopher III of Denmark, is formally enthroned as King Kristofer I of Sweden, bringing an end to the regency of Karl Knutsson Bonde.
  - Breton knight Gilles de Rais is arrested at his castle at Machecoul after an accusation of murdering children is brought against him by the Bishop of Nantes.
- September 21 – The Burgraviate of Nuremberg, a member nation-state of the Holy Roman Empire, comes to an end after more than three centuries when the two sons of the last Burgrave, Frederick V, divide the territory into two separate principalities. Frederick VI (who is also Elector of Brandenburg) becomes the ruler of the Principality of Ansbach, while John III becomes the ruler of the Principality of Bayreuth

==== October–December ====
- October 22 – Gilles de Rais confesses and is sentenced to death on a conviction of murdering at least 140 children. He is hanged on October 26 and his corpse is then burned at the stake.
- November 2 – The Old Zurich War begins as the Canton of Zurich, led by the burgomaster Rudolf Stüssi, is expelled from the Swiss Confederation (Corpus helveticum) by the leaders of the other cantons (Bern, Glarus, Lucerne, Schwyz, Unterwalden, Uri and Zug). Stüssi makes an alliance with Frederick III, Holy Roman Emperor and a war which will last more than five years begins.
- November 3 – Charles, Duke of Orléans, is released from incarceration in England, 25 years after he had been taken as a prisoner of war at the Battle of Agincourt in 1415. His freedom is gained after negotiations made by two of his former enemies, the Duke of Burgundy and the Queen of Portugal, and payment of a ransom of 80,000 gold coins. The Duke of Orleans, now aged 46, returns to French soil after more than a quarter of a century in England.
- November 24 – The "Black Dinner" takes place at Edinburgh Castle as Lord Chancellor of Scotland William Crichton conspires with the James Douglas, uncle of the late Archibald Douglas (who had served as regent for King James II) to invite Archibald's two sons, 16-year old William Douglas, 6th Earl of Douglas and David Douglad to dinner with King James. At the dinner, the two boys are taken hostage and murdered, the members of Clan Douglas besiege the castle, and James Douglas inherits the Earldom.
- December 1 – Representatives of the Swiss canton of Zurich sign the Peace of Lucerne, bringing a temporary halt to the Old Zurich War.

==== Date unknown ====
- Itzcóatl, Aztec ruler of Tenochtitlan, dies and is succeeded by Moctezuma I (Moctezuma Ilhuicamina).
- Lorenzo Valla's De falso credita et ementita Constantini Donatione declamatio demonstrates that the Donation of Constantine is a forgery.
- Sir Richard Molyneux is appointed constable of Liverpool Castle, in England.
- The Ming dynasty government of China begins a decade-long series of issuing harsh edicts towards those who illegally mine silver, the latter known as 'miner bandits' (kuangzei), a trend begun in 1438. The government wants to cap the amount of silver circulating into the market, as more grain taxes are converted into silver taxes. The government establishes community night watches known as 'watches and tithings' (baojia), who ensure that illegal mining activities are brought to a halt. However, these are desperate measures, as illegal silver mining continues to thrive as a dangerous but lucrative venture.
- Uwaifiokun, Oba of Benin, is killed by his brother, the Prince Ogun, who succeeds him as Ewuare I.
- Zhu Quan writes the Cha Pu ("Tea Manual") in China.

=== 1441 ===
==== January–March ====
- January 20 – The siege of Tartas in France is temporarily halted when Charles II of Albret, against whom residents of Gascony are campaigning, and the commander of the English forces, Sir Thomas Rempston, agree to a three-month truce.
- February 7 – Luchuan–Pingmian campaigns: In Ming dynasty China, the Vice Minister of Justice, He Wenyuan, petitions the Imperial Court not to make a second punitive campaign against the kingdom of Möng Mao and its ruler, Si Renfa, arguing that the nation's resources should not be wasted on worthless land. The Minister of War, Wang Ji, joins with General Mu Ang in arguing that Si Renfa should be stopped before he conquers more territory. The Emperor authorizes the second campaign.
- February 12 – King's College, Cambridge, is founded by King Henry VI of England.
- February 24 – The Republic of Venice annexes the seigniory of Ravenna, ending the da Polenta Dynasty.
- February 25 – Elizabeth of Luxembourg , widow of the late King Albert of Hungary presents the Crown of St. Stephen to Frederick, King of Germany and invites him to take the throne, although Hungary's nobles had elected King Władysław III of Poland as King Laszlo of Hungary.
- February 27 – Luchuan–Pingmian campaigns: The second campaign against the Mong Mao state is launched.
- March 1 – Battle of Samobor: The army of Ulrich II, Count of Celje, defeats the army of Stjepan Banić at Samobor, Croatia in union with Hungary.
- March 17 – The Swiss canton of Canton of Bern intervenes to block an agreement between the Canton of Zürich that would have ceded the town of Grüningen to the Habsburg family of Germany.
- March 19 – Isidore of Kiev, the Russian Orthodox Church Metropolitan of Kiev and all Russia, returns to his home in Moscow after having attended the Council of Florence, where he agreed to unify the Russian Church with the Roman Catholic Church. When he arrives, he is arrested on the order of Grand Prince Vasily II and imprisoned under minimum security.

==== April–June ====
- April 1 – Prince Carlos of Viana legally becomes the King of Navarre in Spain upon the death of his mother, Queen Blanca, who had ruled since 1425.
- April 20 — The Council of Florence, led by Pope Eugene IV, declares that the members of the Council of Basel are heretics and votes to excommunicate them, as well as affirming the superiority of the Pope over the Councils in the bull Etsi non dubitemus. In 1440, the Council of Basel had declared Eugene IV to be a heretic, deposed him as Pope, and excommunicated him.
- April 26 — Pope Eugene IV orders the transfer of the Council of Florence to Rome
- May 3 – In Denmark, a rebel army of 25,000 peasants led by Henrik Reventlow repels an attack by Swedish nobles, led by Eske Jensen Brock. The peasants prepare a trap near their camp at St. Jørgensbjerg before the Battle of St. Jorgen's Hill, placing trees and soil over a swamp, and Brock's army of knights becomes mired down, where almost all (including Brock) are slaughtered.
- May 8 – The Siege of Creil is Started on orders of King Charles VII of France against the English held town and council. William Peyto surrenders on May 25.
- June 6 – The siege of Pontoise is started by with 5,000 troops led by King Charles VII of France and Arthur de Richemont, Duke of Brittany, to capture a 1,200 member English Army garrison located on the Île-de-France near Paris. The siege continues for three months until the garrison surrenders.
- June 7 – The University of Bordeaux is established by Pope Eugene IV while Bordeaux is under the control of France."Ressources". Université de Bordeaux. 27 February 2024. Archived from the original on 4 June 2022. Closed in 1793 during the French Revolution, it will reopen in 1896 and continue to be in existence 280 years later.
- June 27 – The siege of Novo Brdo in Serbia ends after eight months as Ottoman Empire troops, led by the Sultan Murad II and General Hadım Şehabeddin guarantee the safe evacuation of the surviving Ragusan defenders, accept the Serbian surrender.

==== July–September ====
- July 12 ((Kakitsu 1, 24th day of the 6th month) – In Japan, the Shōgun Ashikaga Yoshinori is murdered by Akamatsu Mitsusuke, who isupset that Ashikaga has made Akamatsu Sadaura leader of the Akamatsu clan. Over the next 16 days, several prominent nobles allied with Ashikaga are killed during the fighting including Kyōgoku Takakazu, the Shugo of Yamashiro Province and Ōuchi Mochiyo (1394–1441), the head of the Ōuchi clan. After the fighting ceases, Yoshinori's 8-year-old son, Ashikaga Yoshikatsu, is proclaimed as the new shōgun.
- July 23 – Abū r-Rabīʿ Sulaymān al-Mustakfī bi-Llāh, or Al-Mustakfi II, becomes the new Caliph of Cairo upon the death of his father, Al-Mu'tadid II.
- August 15 – King Afonso V of Portugal, the 9-year-old monarch since the 1438 death of his father, King Duarte, is formally betrothed to his cousin, Isabel of Coimbra, aged 10, as part of an arranged marriage planned by Isabel's father Pedro, Duke of Coimbra, the King's regent. Their marriage does not take place until almost six years later, on May 6, 1447.
- August 26 – Bishop Alberto da Sarteano, who had been sent by the Vatican on a mission to seek the Ethiopian Coptic Christian Church to join with the Roman Catholic Church, returns to Rome with four Ethiopians who had been allowed to leave by the Emperor Zara Yaqob. Two of the visitors the attend the Council of Florence to discuss the possible union of Coptic Orthodoxy and the Latin Church, marking the earliest recorded contact of the Ethiopian Coptic Church with Europe.
- September 6 – The Dutch–Hanseatic War concludes with the Treaty of Copenhagen.

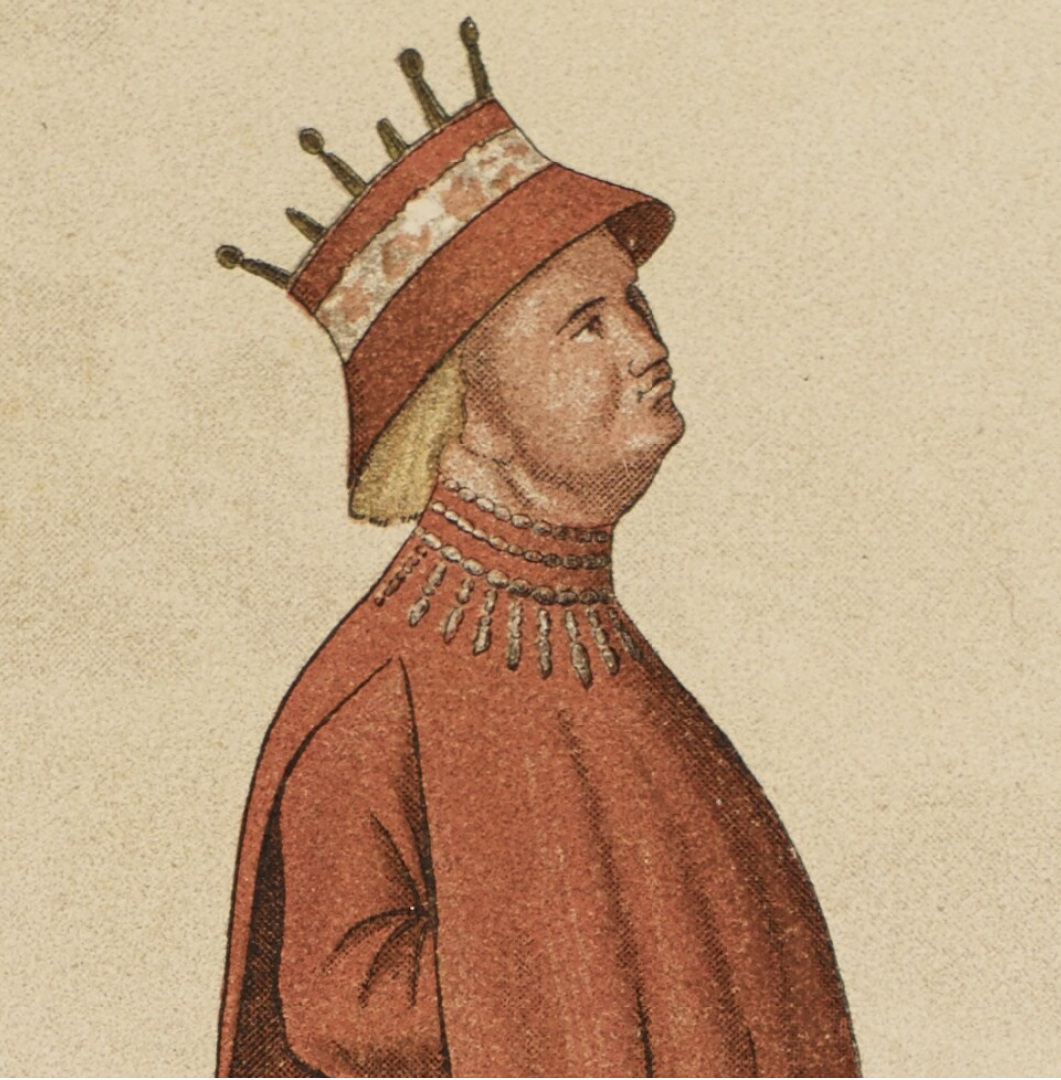
King Cristoffer of Sweden

- September 13 — The coronation of King Christopher II of Denmark as King Cristoffer of Sweden takes place in Uppsala.
- September 15 – The Metropolitan Isidore of Kiev is allowed by Grand Prince Vasily II to escape from imprisonment in Moscow, along with two of his disciples, Gregory the Bulgarian and Afanasy. He flees to Tver and then to Novogrudok and eventually to Rome.
- September 19 – The siege of Pontoise ends after four months, following a three-day final assault led by Marshal André de Laval-Montmorency and Jean de Bueil, Count of Sancerre of the French Army. More than 400 of the English defenders are killed, and hundreds of survivors taken prisoner, including their commander, Baron Clinton. Because Pontoise was not surrendered, the property of the surivors is seized by the French and Clinton and most of his officers are held hostage until a ransom is paid. The English soldiers are not ransomed and are drowned in public instead.

==== October–December ====
- October 2 – (16 Jumada al-Awwal, 845 AH) In what is now Saudi Arabia, Ali ibn Hasan ibn Ajlan is appointed as the new Emir of Mecca by the Mamluk Sultanate and his brother Barakat ibn Hasan is deposed, but the news does not reach Barakat for nearly two months.
- October 4 – Pope Eugene IV issues a papal bull to recognize the Order of St Ambrose.
- October 25 – In accordance with the propsoals for the Peace of Cremona to end the war between Venice and Milan, Francesco I Sforza of Venice marries Bianca Maria Visconti, daughter of the Duke of Milan. An Italian tradition credits the creation of nougat to the celebration of the wedding.
- November 10 – Alfonso V of Aragon lays siege to Naples.
- November 20 – The Peace of Cremona (1441) ends the war between the Republic of Venice and the Duchy of Milan.
- November 29 – (14 Rajab 845 AH) Barakat ibn Hasan learns that he is deposed as Emir of Mecca and leaves that evening.
- December 3 – King Henry VI summons the members of the English Parliament to assemble at Westminster on January 25.
- December 16 – (2 Sha'ban 845 AH) Ali ibn Hasan ibn Ajlan takes office as the new Emir of Mecca.

==== Date unknown ====
- Ouagadougou becomes the capital of the Mossi Kingdoms.
- A revolt occurs in the Mayan nation of Mayapan; the Maya civilization splits into warring city-states.
- With the help of the Grand Duchy of Lithuania, governor Hacı I Giray declares his province independent of the Golden Horde and establishes the Crimean Khanate.
- Nuno Tristão reaches the Ras Nouadhibou (Cabo Branco) on the western coast of Africa. This is probably the first voyage where a caravel is used for maritime exploration.
- The first enslaved black Africans are brought to Europe at Lagos in the Kingdom of Portugal.

=== 1442 ===
==== January–March ====
- January 25 –
  - The English Parliament opens at Westminster for a 60-day session, and the House of Commons re-elects William Tresham as its speaker.
  - The Treaty of Nürtingen is signed between the two counts of Württemberg, the brothers Ludwig and Ulrich, dividing the German territory between them.
  - John Fortescue becomes the new Lord Chief Justice of England and Wales, replacing the late John Hody.
- January 25 – Two months after the death of the Burmese King Minye Kyawswa I of Ava, his brother-in-law Thihapate of Mohnyin turns down an offer to rule the kingdom, and recommends that Kyswswa's younger brother, Thihathu, Viceroy of Prome, become the new King.
- February 4 – As part of his campaign to reunite the Christian churches of the world, Pope Eugene IV promulgates the Bull of Union with the Copts (officially, Cantate Domino), an attempted union with the Coptic Orthodox Church of Egypt.
- March 25 – Battle of Hermannstadt: After seven days of fighting that began on March 18, John Hunyadi defeats an army of the Ottoman Empire (80,000 strong), led by Mezid Bey of Vidin, near Sibiu in what is now Romania.
- March 27 – The English Parliament adjourns and King Henry VI gives royal assent to numerous adts passed, including the Treason Act 1442 (making the act of restraining English citizens or possessions within Wales an act punishable as treason) and the Peeresses Act 1441 (requiring that wives of nobles shall be put on trial in the same way as the peers of the realm)

==== April–June ====
- April 6 – Thihathu is enthroned as the new Burmese King Narapati I of Ava.Royal Historical Commission of Burma (2003) [1832]. Hmannan Yazawin (in Burmese). Vol. 2. Yangon: Ministry of Information, Myanmar. p. 81.
- May 8 – In Germany, the Electorate of Brandenburg and the Duchy of Pomerania enter into an alliance against the Duchy of Mecklenburg-Stargard.
- June 2 – After a six-month siege, King Alfonso of Aragon proclaims himself King of Naples. Alfonso allows the French ruler, King René of Anjou, to return to France.
- June 4 – Erik III is deposed as King of Norway and the nobles vote to invite King Christopher of Sweden to become the new monarch.
- June 8 – In China, Qian marries the 14-year-old Emperor Yingzong of Ming and becomes the primary Empress Consort.
- June 17 – Friedrich, Duke of Inner Austria is crowned as Romanorum Rex, King of the Germans, and becomes the heir to the Holy Roman Emperor.
- June 24 – The Siege of Tartas ends in France after almost two years, when French forces come to the relief of Charles II of Albret and force the Gascony rebels and English troops to retreat.

==== July–September ====
- July 2 – The coronation of King Christopher of Sweden and Denmark as King of Norway takes place in Oslo.
- August 29 – Fransez I becomes the new Duke of Brittany upon the death of his father, Yann V. Princess Isabella of Scotland, who had been part of a contract to marry Jean V, arranges to marry Francis I
- August 30 – Louis IV, Elector Palatine, agrees to serve as the judge in resolving a dispute between Henry II, Count of Nassau-Siegen and the Archbishop Jakob von Sierck.
- September 2 – John Hunyadi defeats another army of the Ottoman Empire (70,000 strong), led by Hadım Şehabeddin, Beylerbey (or governor) of Rumelia, near the Ialomița River. Following this, he places Basarab II as ruler of Wallachia.
- September 15 – Lê Nhân Tông becomes the new Emperor of Vietnam upon the death of his father, Lê Thái Tông.

==== October–December ====
- October 18 – The University of Ferrara is reopened in Italy, after having been closed for 48 years.
- November 18 – A few days before his 15th birthday, Emperor Yingzong of Ming assumes full control of the Empire of China, two days before the death of his grandmother and regent Empress Dowager Chengxiaozhao.
- December 13 – King Wladyslaw III of Poland, who had been elected as King of Hungary in 1440, and Elisabeth of Luxembourg, widow of King Albert of Hungary and mother of Ladislaus the Posthumous, whom she arranged to be crowned king, reach an agreement in the Hungaryian city of Győr, brokered by Cardinal Julian Cesarini. Elizabeth dies at the age of 33, six days after the meeting, leading to rumors that she had been poisoned by King Wladyslaw.
- December 18 – In Italy Tomaso di Campofregoso, Doge of the Republic of Genoa, is removed from office by a group of armed men, led by Raffaele Adorno and Giovanni Antonio Fieschi, who invade the Ducal Palace and force him to leave.
- December 19 – Pope Eugene IV issues the papal bull Illius qui se pro divini granting full remission of sins to any Christian who had participated in the Crusades by Prince Henry the Navigator against the Saracens.

==== Date unknown ====
- The community of Rauma, Finland is granted its town rights.
- The municipality of Juva, Finland is founded.
- The national law of Kristofers landslag is introduced in Sweden.
- After being imprisoned (before September) by the Sultan, Vlad II Dracul is temporarily replaced, as ruler of Wallachia, by his son Mircea II.
- A fourth tower is added to Liverpool Castle in England.
- Jelena Balšić completes writing the Gorički zbornik manuscripts at her church of St. Mary, on the island of Beška in the Serbian Despotate.
- Portuguese sailors first arrive at the Senegal River.

=== 1443 ===
==== January–March ====
- January 1 –
  - Pope Eugene IV called for Christians under his jurisdiction to participate in the Crusade of Varna against the incursions of the Ottoman Empire into Central Europe.
  - The coronation of Christoffer III as King of Denmark and of his wife Dorothea of Brandenburg, as Queen Consort, took place at the Vor Frue Maria Dormkirke in Ribe, nearly three years after he had first claimed the throne on April 9, 1440.
- January 28 – Raffaele Adorno was elected as the new Doge of the Republic of Genoa.
- February 26 – The Spanish monarch, King Alfonso V of Aragon, makes a trimphant entrance into the city of Naples in order to assume the throne of the Kingdom of Naples.
- March 11 – At the age of 16 months old, Charlotte of Savoy, daughter of Louis, Duke of Savoy, is betrothed in a ceremony to Frederick III of the House of Wettin, the 4-year-old son of Frederick II, Elector of Saxony. No marriage takes place, however, and Charlotte will marry the Crown Prince of France in 1451.

==== April–June ====
- April 12 – Henry Chichele, the Roman Catholic Archbishop of Canterbury for almost 29 years, dies and is succeeded by John Stafford on May 13.
- April 23 – The Duke of York, Richard Plantagenet, signs a treaty with Isabella of Portugal, Duchess of Burgundy for an indefinite truce between the Kingdom of England and the Duchy of Burgundy.
- May 13 – John Stafford is appointed as the new Archbishop of Canterbury by Pope Eugene IV.
- June 5 – The strongest earthquake on record in Poland kills at least 30 people and damages buildings in Kraków and Wrocław, and in Timișoara and Oradea in Romania.
- June 6 – Afonso V of Aragon formally reunites the Kingdoms of Naples and Sicily.
- June 14 – Pope Eugene IV and King Alfonso V of Naples reach a forma agreement at Terracina, with the Pope recognizing Alfonso as the rightful King and Prince Ferrante as heir to the throne, while Alfonso agrees to stop support of the antipope Amadeus VII and the Council of Basel.

==== July–September ====
- July 22 – Battle of St. Jakob an der Sihl (Old Zurich War): The forces of the city of Zurich are defeated, but the Swiss Confederacy have insufficient strength to besiege and take the city.
- August 14 – The Siege of Dieppe, an attempt by England's Earl of Shrewsbury to capture the French port at Normandy and France's access to the English Channel, fails after nine months.
- September 28 – Pope Eugene IV returns to Rome for the first time in more than nine years, after having been forced to flee on June 4, 1434.

==== October–December ====
- October 22 – Pedro de Portugal, Duke of Coimbra and regent for the 11-year old King Afonso V, grants letters patent to his younger brother Dom Henrique of Navegador ("Prince Henry the Navigator"), giving Henrique an exclusive monopoly over all navigation south of Cape Bojador, whether for the purpose of war or trade, as well as a commission on any African goods or slaves brought back to mainland Portugal.
- November 8 – Battle of Niš: John Hunyadi and the army of the Crusade of Varna defeat three armies of the Ottoman Empire, and capture the city of Niš in modern-day Serbia; Skanderbeg deserts the Ottoman camp and goes to Albania.
- November 28 – Skanderbeg and his forces, rebelling against the Ottoman Empire, liberate Krujë, in Middle Albania, and raise the Albanian flag.
- December 12 – At the Battle of Zlatitsa in what is now Bulgaria, Ottoman troops under the Sultan Murad II and General Kasim Pasha defeat an attack by John Hunyadi and the forces of Hungary, Croatia, Poland and Serbia.
- December 24 –
  - The Christian crusaders under Hunyadi begin their retreat westward after their defeat at Zlatica, and the Ottoman forces follow them, with a confrontation ultimately taking place on January 2 at the Battle of Kunovica.
  - In Poland, Wenceslaus I, Duke of Siewierz sells the duchy of Siewierz to Zbigniew Oleśnicki, Bishop of Kraków, for 6,000 silver coins (Prague groschen), equivalent to at least 21 kilograms (46 lb) or 750 ounces of silver.
- December 30 – King Sejong the Great of Korea announces the creation of the Hunminjeongeum (literally "The Proper Sounds for the Instruction of the People") a manual for Hangul, a standardized writing system for the Korean language.

==== Date unknown ====
- In Moldavia, the conflict between brothers and co-rulers Iliaș and Stephen II reignites, and Stephen captures Iliaș and blinds him, thus remaining sole ruler of the country.
- Portuguese explorer Nuno Tristão penetrates the Arguin Gulf, off the west coast of Africa.
- King Sejong the Great starts to create Hangul, the native alphabet of the Korean language, with his scholars.
- Vlad II Dracul begins his second term as ruler of Wallachia, succeeding Basarab II.
- The Buddhist Zhihua Temple (智化寺) is built in Beijing, at the order of Wang Zhen, chief eunuch at the court of the Emperor Yingzong of Ming Dynasty China.
- A powerful earthquake destroys the Timișoara Fortress in the Kingdom of Hungary

=== 1444 ===
==== January–March ====
- January 2 – The Battle of Kunovica is fought between the Christian crusaders, led by John Hunyadi, and the Muslim armies of the Ottoman Empire in what is now Serbia. After having retreated 10 days earlier following their loss in the Battle of Zlatitsa, Hunyadi and King Wladyslaw III of Hungary defeat the Ottoman forces and take several of their commanders as prisoners of war, including Mahmud Bey, son-in-law of the Sultan Murad II.
- February 15 – Stjepan Vukčić Kosača, the Grand Duke of Bosnia, signs a treaty with the King Alfonso of Naples, agreeing to become his vassal in exchange for help against the Republic of Venice.
- March 2 – The League of Lezhë, an alliance of Albanian principalities, is established in Lezhë; George Kastrioti Skanderbeg is proclaimed commander of the Albanian resistance.

==== April–June ====
- April 15 – King Wladyslaw of Hungary appears before the Országgyűlés, the Diet of Hungary in Buda, and pledges to the legislators present that he will lead the attack against the Turkish Muslims in the summer.
- April 18 – In Sicily, the University of Catania receives papal recognition from Pope Eugene IV, ten years after its founding on October 19, 1434.
- May 22 – The Treaty of Tours, signed between England and France, secures a truce in the Hundred Years' War for five years.
- June 15 – Cosimo de' Medici founds a public library at San Marco, Florence.
- June 29 – Battle of Torvioll: Skanderbeg defeats an Ottoman army.

==== July–September ====
- July 22 – Oddantonio da Montefeltro, the Duke of Urbino, an independent duchy in what is now the Le Marche region of Italy, is assassinated at his palace by conspirators, who also murder his counsellors Manfredo dei Pio da Carpi and Tommaso di Guido dell'Agnello. He is succeeded by his half-brother, Federico da Montefeltro.
- August 6 – A Portuguese fleet of caravels, led by Lançarote de Freitas, lands 235 slaves at Algarve, Portugal.
- August 15 – The Peace of Szeged is signed between the Turkish Ottoman Empire and Hungary.
- August 22 – Đurađ Branković reclaims Serbia from Ottoman control after the signing of the peace of Szeged, and Wladyslaw of Hungary offers the throne of Bulgaria to John Hunyadi.
- August 26 – Old Zürich War – Battle of St. Jakob an der Birs: Charles VII of France, seeking to send away troublesome troops made idle by the truce with England, sends his son (the Dauphin Louis) with a large army into Switzerland, to support the claims of Frederick III, Holy Roman Emperor. The massively outnumbered Swiss force is destroyed in this battle, but inflict such casualties on the French that they withdraw.
- August – After making peace with the Karamanids, Ottoman Sultan Murad II abdicates in favor of his son Mehmed II.
- September 9 – General Alvise Loredan, commander of the Venetian and Papal States squadrons in the Crusade of Varna, receives instructions from the Republic of Venice to open secret negotiations with the Ottoman Sultan and to abstain from offensive actions until further notice. Loredan is soon faced with defending an Ottoman invasion of Europe.
- September 18 – As the Crusade of Varna resumes, the 16,000 Christian soldiers under the command of Wladyslaw and Hunyadi begin crossing over the Danube river near Belgrade and complete their crossing into Ottoman Muslim territory in Bulgaria.

==== October–December ====
- October 20 – As the Christian crusaders begin their approach to the Black Sea, the former Ottoman Sultan Murad II comes out of retirement at Bursa to assume command of the Ottoman troops.
- November 10 – Battle of Varna: The crusading forces of King Władysław III of Poland and Hungary are defeated by the Turks, under Sultan Murad II. Władysław is killed, ending the Jagiellonian Union of Hungary and Poland.
- December 24 – Ottoman General Kasım Pasha is defeated in the Battle of Melštica near Sofia by Christian troops who had survived the Battle of Varna.

==== Date unknown ====
- Constantine XI Palaiologos, as ruler of the Despotate of the Morea, invades the Duchy of Athens (at this time under Florentine control), and forces it to pay tribute and return Thebes to the Byzantine Empire.
- Forces of the Sultan of Egypt fail to take Rhodes from the Knights of Rhodes.
- Portuguese explorers reach the mouth of the rivers Senegal and Gambia.
- The first European slave market for the sale of African slaves, the Mercado de Escravos, opens in Lagos, Portugal.
- A serious fire occurs at Old St Paul's Cathedral in London.
- The Iguvine Tablets are discovered at Gubbio, Italy.
- Stephen II of Moldavia takes as co-ruler his step brother Petru, also brother-in-law to John Hunyadi.

=== 1445 ===
==== January–March ====
- January 1 – In northern India, Ala-ud-Din Alam Shah becomes the new Sultan of Delhi upon the death of his father, Muhammad Shah IV.
- January 13 – King Henry VI of England summons the English Parliament for the first time in almost three years, directing the Lords and the members of the House of Commons to assemble at Westminster on February 25.
- January 19 – In Poland, the Duchy of Oświęcim, ruled jointly since 1434 by the three sons of the late Duke Casimir of the Piast dynasty, is divided between the three brothers. Wenceslaus I, the eldest, receives the Duchy of Zator, Przemysław becomes ruler of Toszek and Jan IV, the youngest of the brothers, receives the capital, Oświęcim, along with the towns of Kęty and Żywiec.
- February 25 – The English Parliament is opened by King Henry IV. On the first day, the House of Commons elects William Burley as its Speaker.
- March 8 – The Amir Isfahan of Baghdad (born Ispend bin Yusuf) dies after a reign of 12 years and is succeeded by Fulad Mirza. The ruler of the adjacent Qara Qoyunlu Empire, Jahan Shah, then mobilizes an army at Tabriz to invade and take control of Baghdad.

==== April–June ====
- April 7 – In southern Germany, the number of Duchies of Bavaria is reduced from three to two when Bavaria-Ingolstadt is reunited with Bavaria-Landshut, under the rule of Heinrich the Rich following the death of Ludwig the Hunchback of Ingolstadt. The Duchy of Bavaria-Munich, ruled by Albert III the Pious remains the only other duchy in Bavaria.
- April 8 – At West Java in what is now Indonesia, the Sultanate of Cirebon establishes its capital at Dukuh Alang-alang and Ki Gedeng Alang-Alang is designated as the Sultan.
- April 9 – The 14th Parliament of King Henry VI (23 H. 6) closes and royal assent is given to new laws, including the Labourers Act (requiring that "A servant in husbandry purporting to depart from his master must give him half a year's warning, or else shall serve him the year following.") and the Exportation Act ("Whoever shall pack or ship thrums or threads to pass beyond the seas, during the three years next coming, shall forfeit the same, or the value.")
- April 23 – King Henry VI of England marries Margaret of Anjou, daughter of René of Anjou, the former King of Naples, at a ceremony at Titchfield Abbey in Hampshire.
- May 29 – Stjepan Tomaš Kotromanić of the House of Kotromanić is granted recognition by the Roman Catholic Church and Pope Eugene IV as King Tomaš of Bosnia.
- May 30 – At a ceremony at Westminster Abbey, the coronation of Margaret of Anjou as Queen consort of England takes place before John Stafford, Archbishop of Canterbury.
- June 1 – In Hungary, the deadline passes for King Vladislaus I (who is also King Wladyslaw III of Poland), to return from the Crusade against the Ottoman Empire and to resume rule, and the 5-year-old Ladislaus the Posthumous is recognized as King of Hungary by the legislators of the Országgyűlés. To administer the kingdom of Hungary during the minority of Ladislaus, the Hungarian nobles elect seven "Captains in Chief" – John Hunyadi, Michael Ország, George Rozgonyi, Pongrác Szentmiklósi, Janos Jiskra, Miklos Újlaki and Emeric Bebek – to administer the kingdom Confirmation is made later that King Vladislaus had been killed almost seven months earlier at the November 10 Battle of Varna.
- June 24 – Annibale I Bentivoglio, the ruler of the semi-independent Lordship of Bologna since 1443, is assassinated by the rival Canneschi family, with the support of Pope Eugene IV.

==== July–September ====
- July 7 – The Battle of Suzdal takes place 120 miles (190 km) from Moscow when Ulugh Muhammad of the Khanate of Kazan attacks Nizhny Novgorod, part of the Grand Principality of Moscow. The Grand Prince Vasily II of Moscow is captured in battle as a prisoner of war and held for ransom until the payment of 200,000 rubles is completed in November.
- July 16 – In Germany, Frederick II, Elector of Saxony and his brother William III, Duke of Luxembourg, agree to negotiate the Division of Altenburg, in hopes of peacefully splitting lands in Thuringia which they had inherited from their father's cousin, Frederick IV, Landgrave of Thuringia.
- August 7 – A papal bull is issued by Pope Eugene IV declaring that the Chaldean Christians and the Maronites of Cyprus are in full communion with the Roman Catholic Church.
- August 16 – Margaret Stewart, Dauphine of France, daughter of the late King James I of Scotland and wife of the Dauphin Louis, son of King Charles VII of France, dies from an illness contracted a week earlier. On her deathbed, she accuses a court official, Jamet de Tillay, of having slandered her reputation and causing her death.
- September 5 – In Switzerland, troops from the Canton of Zürich launch a new attack on Brugg in the Canton of Aargau, but their raid is detected before they can reach the city and the Zurich troops are repelled. The troops then pillage surrounding villages.
- September 12 – In a royal wedding at the Church of Our Lady in Copenhagen, King Christoffer III of Denmark (who also rules Sweden and Norway) marries Dorothea of Brandenburg, daughter of John the Alchemist, Margrave of Brandenburg. After King Christoffer's death in 1448, Dorothea marries King Christian I of Denmark in 1449.
- September 14 – Queen consort Dorothea is crowned as "Queen of the Union of the Three Kingdoms" (kronet som unionsdronning af de tre kongeriger) in a ceremony at Copenhagen two days after her marriage to King Christoffer, who levies a series of taxes to pay for the expense.
- September 17 – Đurađ Branković, Despot of Serbia, and his sons Grgur, Stefan and Lazar sign a charter confirming the sovereignty and privileges of the Republic of Ragusa, located in what is now Croatia.
- September 26 – Negotiations between the Saxon brothers Frederick and William on the division of Thuringia break down after Frederick asserts that he will claim western Thuringia and will only allow William to inherit the Margraviate of Meissen.
- September 29 – In Normandy, Richard of York, 3rd Duke of York of England's House of Plantagenet, completes his five-year term as Lieutenant-general of British-occupied France and Edmund Beaufort, 2nd Duke of Somerset takes his place. He returns to England on October 20.

==== October–December ====
- October 6 – A battle is fought at Erlenbach in Switzerland as troops from the canton of Zurich defeat a group of wine thieves. The battle takes place a year after the first battle of Erlenbach that had been waged on October 13, 1444.
- October 10 – At the Battle of Mokra, Albanian forces under the command of the rebel Skanderbeg, with 3,500 soldiers, defeat the more than 9,000 Ottoman troops led by Firuz Pasha. Firuz is killed in battle along with 1,500 of his men. Pope Eugene IV raises a hymn of praise, that Christendom has been provided with a new defender, after he hears of the battle).
- November 3 – (3rd waxing of Nadaw 807 ME) In the city of Bhamo (now in Myanmar, Chinese troops invade and proceed toward Inwa, the fortified capital of the Kingdom of Ava in pursuit of Thonganbwa, the ruler of the independent state of Mogaung, who had led numerous raids into China's Yunnan Province. King Narapati I of Ava, who had captured Thonganbwa in 1442, negotiates an agreement to hand Thonganbwa over to the Chinese in return for assistance in helping Ava conquer rebels in Yamethin. Before he can be turned over to China for execution, Thonganbwa commits suicide, but China accepts his corpse as a recognition of Ava's submission.
- December 11 – At a monastery in Neuwerk in Halle, with the mediation of the Landgrave Louis II of Hesse, the Archbishop Frederick III of Magdeburg, and the Margrave Frederick II of Brandenburg, William III, Duke of Luxembourg and his brother Frederick II, Elector of Saxony, the two surviving sons of Frederick I, Elector of Saxony, make a final attempt to agree on the division of lands in Thuringia which they had inherited from their father's cousin, Frederick IV, Landgrave of Thuringia. Despite the mediation, Frederick of Saxony and William of Luxembourg are not able to agree and the Saxon Fratricidal War begins a few months later.
- December 25 – In northeastern Africa, the Battle of Gomit is fought between the Ethiopian Empire (whose troops are led by the Emperor Zara Yaqob ) and the Adal Sultanate, whose invading army is led by the Sultan Badlay ibn Sa'ad ad-Din. The Sultan charges toward the Emperor, who kills him with his spear. The Adal troops flee and many are killed by the pursuing Ethiopian troops. Badlay's son, Muhammad ibn Badlay, survives and becomes the new Sultan.

==== Date unknown ====
- The Portuguese set up their first trading post (Feitoria) in Africa, on the island of Arguin.
- Portuguese explorer Dinis Dias discovers the Cap-Vert, on the western coast of Africa.
- Vlad II Dracul, aided by a crusaders' fleet from Burgundy, attacks Giurgiu, and massacres the Ottoman garrison after their surrender.
- Stephen II remains sole ruler of Moldavia.

=== 1446 ===
==== January–March ====
- January 2 – (5th waxing of Tabodwe 807 ME) At the city of Taungoo in what is now Myanmar, 14-year-old Minkhaung I becomes the new Viceroy of Toungoo, a semi-independent vassal state of the Kingdom of Ava, ruled by King Narapati I of Ava. Minkhaung's ascension comes hours after the sudden death of his father, the Viceroy Tarabya.
- January 15 – On his 14th birthday, Afonso V is acclaimed as King of Portugal, with full power to govern the kingdom, although his uncle, Pedro, Duke of Coimbra continues to operateas regent. Afonso had succeeded to the throne in 1438 upon the death of his father, King Duarte I.
- January 24 – The Battle of Arbroath takes place in Scotland as the monks of the Abbey of Arbroath dismiss Alexander Lindsay, son of the Earl of Crawford, from the position of Bailie of the Regality, and replace him with Alexander Ogilvy, Baron of Inverquharity. Lindsay attacks the abbey with fellow members of his own Clan Lindsay and the assistance of Clan Hamilton, while Ogilvy is supported by Clan Oliphant, Clan Seton, Clan Gordon and Clan Forbes. The Earl of Crawford, seeking to avert the battle, rides his horse to the battlefield in hopes of conferring with Ogilvy, but is killed by a member of Ogilvy's infantry. In the battle that follows, Clan Lindsay prevails and Ogilvy is killed.
- February 12 – Vasily II, the Grand Prince of Moscow and ruler of much of Russia, is kidnapped from Trinity Monastery the Kremlin by allies of his cousin, Dmitry Shemyaka. Four days later (February 16), the conspirators tear out the eyes of Grand Prince Vasily and send him into exile at Uglich with his wife.
- March 6 – The Battle of Ragaz marks the last military conflict of the Old Zurich War between the Swiss Confederacy and the Habsburgs, as 1,200 soldiers of the Confederation defeat the Austrian army, commanded by Hans von Rechberg and Wolfhart V. von Brandis, the Habsburg bailiff of Feldkirch. Among other things, the banners of the lords of Brandis are lost to the confederates and later transferred to the church in Sarnen. According to contemporary accounts, around 900 men from the Habsburg army and around 100 men from the Swiss army fell in the battle.
- March 21 – In the Holy Roman Empire in Germany, the Electors of Cologne, Trier, Mainz, and the Palatinate, along with representatives of the Electors of Saxony and Brandenburg, assemble at Frankfurt-am-Main and create a mutural defense alliance to resist Pope Eugene IV.

==== April–June ====
- April 7 – In England, Thomas de Ashton and Edmund de Trafford, both knights of Lancashire, are granted special dispensation by King Henry VI to use their research in alchemy to transmute substances into precious metals.
- April 28 – Queen Soheon of Joseon, Queen consort of King Sejong of Korea, dies 27 years after her husband first assended the throne. King Sejong spends the remaining four years of his life in mourning and becomes a vegetarian.
- May 2 – (5 Safar 849 AH) Sultan Muhammad of the Timurid Empire in Iran arrives in Isfahan and forces out a disloyal governor, Sa'adat, then declares an amnesty on taxes, stages a feast and celebration, and appoints Shah Ala' al-Din Naqib as the new governor.
- May 24 – In what is now the state of Karnataka in India, Prince Mallikarjuna Raya becomes the new Emperor of Vijayanagara upon the death of his father, Deva Raya II, and takes the name of Emperor Deva Raya III.
- June 6 – John Hunyadi is proclaimed regent of Hungary during the minority of King Ladislaus the Posthumous, with the title Regni Gubernator. His election is primarily promoted by the lesser nobility, but Hunyadi has by this time become one of the richest barons of the kingdom. His domains cover an area exceeding 800,000 hectares (2,000,000 acres). Hunyadi is one of the few contemporaneous barons who has spent a significant part of their revenues to finance the wars against the Ottomans, thus bearing a large share of the cost of fighting for many years.
- June 8 – After a siege of seven months, Baghdad is captured by the Sultan Jahan Shah of Qara Qoyunlu, whose forces move into what is now Iraq.
- June 12 – An armistice between Duchy of Austria and the Swiss Confederation comes into force, ending the Old Zurich War.
- June 21 – Lidköping gets its charter, and thus qualifies as one of the now defunct Cities of Sweden.
- June 26 – Gilles de Bretagne, the brother of Francois I, Duke of Brittany, is arrested after allowing agents of King Charles VII of France to enter his home, Château du Guildo. He is eventually murdered while in custody at La Harduinaie.

==== July–September ====
- July 28 – The compilation of the Alfonsine Ordinances, the first codification of the laws of the Kingdom of Portugal, is completed by Rui Fernandes of Almada and given to Dom Pedro de Coimbra, the regent for King Afonso V.
- August 24 – After many years of fruitless negotiations between Christopher of Bavaria and Eric of Pomerania, a Swedish war march to Gotland is launched in the early summer of 1446. King Christopher comes with a force to the island and on an open field in Västergarn with crossbowmen at gunpoint behind each monarch's back; regular peace negotiations take place.
- August – Christopher of Bavaria undertakes a fruitless military campaign against Gotland to end Eric of Pomerania's piracy.
- September 27 – Battle of Otonetë: Skanderbeg defeats the Ottomans.

==== October–December ====
- October 5 – The compromise proposed by Holy Roman Emperor Frederick III with Pope Eugene IV is publicly endorsed by the Elector of Mainz, the Elector of Brandenburg, the Margrave of Ansbach, the Margrave Jakob I of Baden, the Grand Master of the Teutonic Order, the Archbishop of Salzburg, the and the Bishops of Augsburg, Chiemsee, Bamberg, Passau, Constanz and Chur.
- October 9 – The hangul alphabet is proclaimed in Korea, by King Sejong the Great. The Hunmin Jeongeum, published during the year, is considered the start of this brand new scientific writing system.
- October 10 – An earthquake occurs in Moscow but causes little damage
- October 11 – In what is now the Indian state of Madhya Pradesh, Mahmud Khalji, Sultan of Malwa attempts to cross the Banas River to invade Mandalgarh in what is now the state of Rajasthan, but he and his armies are driven back by the forces of the Rana Kumbhakaran Singh, ruler of the Kingdom of Mewar.
- October – Murad II, who recently became the Sultan of the Ottoman Empire after his son Mehmed II was forced by the Janissaries to abdicate, invades Attica, forcing Constantine XI to return Thebes to the duchy of Athens, and remove the tribute imposed in 1444. Murad II imposes his own tribute.
- November 13 – In Italy, Sante Bentivoglio, who had recently been "working in the wool industry in Florence under another name" becomes the ruler of Bologna at age 20 when he is named as guardian of the young child of the recently-assassinated Annibale I Bentivoglio
- December 10 – After hesitating for several weeks, Sultan Murad II, of the Ottoman Empire, destroys the Hexamilion wall, in an assault that includes cannons. Murad and the Ottoman governor of Thessaly, Turakhan Beg, ravage the Peloponnese Peninsula at will, with the Sultan devastating the northern shore, while Glarentza and Turakhan raid in the interior. The Despotate of the Morea is turned into an Ottoman vassal state.
- December 14 – King Henry VI summons the English Parliament to assemble at Cambridge on February 10.
- December 23 – On their way back to England after a pilgrimage to the Holy Land, the 37 pilgrims on the ship Cog Anne are killed when the vessel strikes a rock near the port of Modon in Greece.
- December 24 – Edmund Beaufort, Marquess of Dorset, is appointed as last Governor of English-occupied France.

==== Date unknown ====
- Nuno Tristão is killed by natives on the coast of Senegal.
- Portuguese navigator Álvaro Fernandes reaches the mouth of the Casamance River in Senegal.
- The Precious Belt Bridge in China is fully reconstructed.
- In Italy, the siege of Cremona, by the condottieri troops of Francesco Piccinino and Luigi dal Verme, is raised after the arrival of Scaramuccia da Forlì.
- The Blarney Stone is set into a tower of Blarney Castle in Blarney, County Cork in Ireland.

=== 1447 ===
==== January–March ====
- January 4 – Barnaba Adorno becomes the new Doge of the Republic of Genoa when his cousin Raffaele Adorno steps down after slightly less than four years in office. Baranaba holds the office for only a few weeks before being forced by the Adorno family's rivals, the Campofregoso family to flee the Doge's Palace on January 29.
- January 30 – Giano di Campofregoso is elected as the new Doge of Genoa the day after his family forces Barnaba Adorno out of the city.
- February 11 – The English Parliament is opened by King Henry VI for a three week session that closes on March 3.
- February 20 – Humphrey, Duke of Gloucester, uncle and heir apparent of King Henry VI of England, is arrested on a charge of treason. He dies from a stroke three days later while imprisoned at Bury St Edmunds in Suffolk Richard of York becomes next in line for the throne.
- February 23 – Pope Eugene IV, leader of the Roman Catholic Church since 1431, dies shortly after issuing his last papal bulls.
- February 27 – Vasily II returns as Grand Prince of Moscow after being recalled from exile by Dmitry Shemyaka, who had blinded him the year before. Shemyaka still attempts to control the Principality of Moscow.
- March 4 – The papal conclave opens at the Santa Maria sopra Minerva in Rome with 18 of the 24 living members of the College of Cardinals arriving to select a new Popel With 12 votes necessary for the require two-thirds needed for an election, Cardinal Prospero Colonna receives 10 and Cardinal Domenico Capranica gets 8.
- March 6 – On the fourth vote of the papal conclave, Prospero Colonna is still unable to gain more than 10 votes, and Cardinal Capranica addresses the group, warning that Rome would be under attack from the King of Aragon. At the intervention of Cardinal Giovanni Berardi, the cardinals begin voting for a compromise candidate, Tommaso Parentucelli, who wins 12 votes. Parentucelli then takes the regnal name of Pope Nicholas V, the 208th Bishop of Rome and Pope.
- March 13 – At Herat, Ulugh Beg (born Mirza Muhammad Taraghay) becomes the new ruler of the Timurid Empire upon the death of his father Sharukh Mirza, who had reigned for 42 years. The Empire is in decline but still controls most of what is now Afghanistan as well as parts of Iraq and Pakistan.
- March 16 – A major fire destroys the centre of Valencia.
- March 19 – The coronation of Tommaso Parentucelli as Pope Nicholas V takes place in Rome. The crown is placed upon his head by Cardinal Prospero Colonna, who had come within two votes of being selected as the Pope on March 5.
- March 26 – Dmitry Shemyaka flees Moscow from the supporters of Vasily II.
- Franzes I, Duke of Brittany, reverses the policy of his father, the late Duke Yann the Wise and allows the Caquin minority to have certain rights of trade within specified areas in the bishoporic of Vannes.

==== April – June ====
- April 20 – Abdal-Latif Mirza, son of the recently-crowned Timurid Emperor Ulugh Beg, is defeated in battle at Nishapur by his cousin Ala al-Dawla Mirza, another claimant to the Timurid throne, shortly after Abdal-Latif had captured the city of Damghan and al-Dawla had conquered Mashad.
- April 22 – (5 Safar 851 AH) Khwaja Ubaidullah Ahrar becomes the new leader of the tariqa (order) of Süleymancılar among adherents of Sufism in what is now Turkey.
- May 6 – In a royal wedding at Lisbon, King Afonso V of Portugal is married to his first cousin, Princess Isabel of Coimbra, when both of them are 15 years old. Isabel is the daughter of Afonso's uncle, Dom Pedro, Duke of Coimbra, who continues to serve as the regent for King Afonso.
- June 25 – Kazimieras Jogailaitis, Grand Duke of Lithuania since 1440, is crowned King of Poland as Casimir IV Jagiellon, bringing an end to an interregnum that had existed since 1444 when Casimir's brother King Wladyslaw III had left Poland to fight in a Crusade against the Ottoman Turks.

==== July – September ====
- July 13 – At Suceava (now in Romania) Stefan II], Voivode of Moldavia since 1434, is killed in a coup d'etat by his nephew, Roman II.
- July 22 – In a royal wedding at the cathedral in Madrigal de las Altas Torres in the Kingdom of Castile (now in Spain) Princess Isabella of Portugal, cousin of King Afonso VI, marries King Juan II of Castile.
- August 13 – The Milanese War of Succession begins in Italy when Filippo Maria Visconti, Duke of Milan since 1412, dies from natural causes. In that Visconti had no male heir, he had bequeathed the Duchy to King Afonso V, ruler of the Kingdom of Naples (in Italy) and the Crown of Aragon (in Spain), as well as his son-in-law Francesco I Sforza and Sigismund, Archduke of Austria.
- August 14 – As competition begins over who will inherit the right to rule the Duchy of Milan, members of the University of Pavia proclaim the Golden Ambrosian Republic (Aurea Repubblica Ambrosiana), ruled by a 12-member council, the Capitani della Libertà (Captains of Liberty), led by professor Giorgio Lampugnano.
- September 15 – Roman II seizes the throne of Moldavia after killing his uncle, Stephen II, and makes plans to enlist his other uncle, Petru as co-ruler.

==== October – December ====
- October 11 – In the Battle of Bosco Marengo in Italy, the army the Ambrosian Republic of Milan defeats the 3,000-member force of the Duchy of Orléans, killing half of their troops while losing only 500 of its 3,700 men.
- November 16 – In the War of the Milanese Succession, Francesco Sforza, leader of the forces of the Ambrosian Republic of Milan, overwhelms the city of Piacenza after a siege that began on October 1. According to a contemporary account, Piacenza "endured every evil" from the Milanese over the next 50 days. Cristoforo da Soldo comments that "as for the ravaging of the land that was plundered, it would take a great pile of paper to write down the many cruelties. All the chuchese were robbed.. virgins, married women, widows, and nuns, all of them were shamed, abused and wrongly molested."
- December 7 –Vlad II Dracul, ruler of Wallachia, and his eldest son Mircea are assassinated outside of Bucharest. Vladislav II succeeds him, with the assistance of John Hunyadi, beginning the Albanian–Venetian War.
- December 16 – Lodovico di Campofregoso becomes the Doge of the Republic of Genoa, succeeding his older brother, Giano I, who had taken office "for life

==== Date unknown ====
- The Siege of Soest, Germany, occurs, in the course of the Soest Feud.
- Tashi Lhunpo Monastery is founded by the 1st Dalai Lama at its original location in Shigatse, Tibet.
- Iizasa Ienao founds Tenshin Shōden Katori Shintō-ryū, the earliest historically verifiable Japanese koryū martial art, that will still be extant in modern times.

=== 1448 ===
==== January–March ====
- January 6 – Christopher of Bavaria, King of Denmark, Norway and Sweden, dies at his palace, the Kärnan, in Helsingborg (now in Sweden) with no designated heir, leaving all three kingdoms with vacant thrones. Brothers Bengt Jönsson Oxenstierna and Nils Jönsson Oxenstierna are selected to serve as co-regents of Sweden.
- February 17 – The Concordat of Vienna is signed between the Holy Roman Empire (represented by the Emperor Frederick III and the Holy See.
- February 23 – Petru III becomes Prince of Moldavia for a third time when Prince Roman II dies.
- March 4 – The Republic of Venice offers a reward to anyone who is successful in assassinating the Albanian rebel leader Skanderbeg, with a pension of 100 gold ducats per month as a reward.
- March 16 – The English garrison at Le Mans in France surrenders to the French Army.
- March 19 – The Battle of Río Verde is fought as the 600-member cavalry of the Crown of Castile, is retreating from an attack led by Juan de Saavedra, against invaders from the Emirate of Granada, led by the Sultan Yusuf V. The 1,500 Granadan cavalry overwhelm the Castilians and massacre all but five of the 600 soldiers, while taking Saavedra as a prisoner of war.

==== April–June ====
- April 15 – Queens' College, Cambridge is founded by Margaret of Anjou.
- April 28 – The militia of francs-archers, the first regular infantry in France, is created by the ordonnance of Montil-lès-Tours during the reign of King Charles VII, directing that in each parish, the person most skilled in the use of archery would be exempt from certain obligations in return for perfecting his skills on a weekly basis and being ready to be summoned for combat.
- May 3 – The Treaty of Prenzlau is signed between in Germany by the Margraviate of Brandenburg and the Duchy of Pomerania, both principalities within the Holy Roman Empire. The treaty partitions the disputed territory of the Uckermark, with Brandenburg receiving the southern part and Pomerania the northern part, with rights for Brandenburg to receive the north if Pomerania's ruling house should become extinct.
- May 14 – The Siege of Svetigrad is started by the Ottoman Sultan Murad II against an Albanian fortress at Svetigrad, now Kodžadžik in North Macedonia. After two and a half months, the siege is successful in capturing the fortress.
- May 24 – Under an agreement with the Holy Roman Emperor, Friedrich III, the city council of Basel in Switzerland votes to expel all persons attending the Council of Basel, a group of clerics opposed to the Roman Catholic Pope.
- June 9 – The regency of Portugal ends as Dom Pedro, Duke of Coimbra, as King Afonso V, now 16, dismisses his uncle who had served as regent for almost 10 years after the death of King Duarte in 1738. Influenced by Afonso de Braganza, King Afonso begins nullification of all of the decrees made in his name by Dom Pedro.
- June 20 – The Regency period of Sweden ends with the election by Swedish nobles of Karl Knutsson Bonde as King Karl VIII.
- June 27 – Venice sends Andrea Venier to negotiate with the Ottoman Empire in an attempt to have the Ottomans invade Albania. Afterwards, Venier is sent to meet with Skanderbeg to ask him to cease hostilities.
- June 29 – Karl VIII is crowned as King of Sweden in Uppsala Cathedral the day after being publicly hailed as king at Mora Stones.

==== July–September ====
- July 2 – Catherine Karlsdotter, daughter of Karl Ormsson Gumsehuvud and wife of King Karl VIII of Sweden, is crowned as Queen consort of Sweden.
- July 23 – The League of Lezhë, made up of the armies of various Albanian principalities, defeats the forces of the Venetian Republic and the Ottoman Empire at the battle of Scutari.
- July 25 – The Council of Basel, opposed to the Pope at Rome, reloctes to Lausanne and holds its first session, presided over by the antipope Felix V.
- July 29 – The War in Gotland begins in Scandinavia as an army from Sweden, commanded by Generals Magnus Gren and Birger Trolle, invades the island of Gotland, at the time ruled by Denmark. The invasion is repelled by Erik of Pomerania, ruler of the island and the former King of Sweden and Denmark.
- July 31 – The Siege of Svetigrad ends after 10 weeks as the defenders surrender to the Ottomans. The reason for giving up is the lack of a safe water supply, either because it was contaminated from a dead animal in the castle well, or because the Ottomans were able to locate and cut off the castles source of water.
- August 14 – At the Battle of Oranik, Albanian forces led by Skanderbeg defeat the armies of the Republic of Venice and the Ottoman Empire.
- September 1 – After his betrothal to Dorothea of Brandenburg, Queen Dowager and widow of King Christoffer III (who died in January), German Count Christian of Oldenburg, is elected by the Danish nobility to become the new monarch, King Christian I of Denmark.
- September 3 – Prince George of Poděbrady, leader of the Hussites in Bohemia (now the Czech Republic) captures Prague after leading 9,000 of his troops from Kutná Hora.
- September 15 – At the Battle of Caravaggio, the armies of the Ambrosian Republic of Milan, led by Francesco Sforza, defeat those of the Republic of Venice, commanded by Micheletto Attendolo.
- September 16 – General Thomas Kantakouzenos of the Serbian Despotate recaptures Srebrenica and Višegrad from the Kingdom of Bosnia. led by King Stephen Thomas of Bosnia.
- September 30 – Leonardo III Tocco becomes the new ruler of Epirus upon the death of his father Carlo II Tocco.

==== October–December ====
- October 4 – Peace between Albania and Venice is established, bringing an end to the Albanian–Venetian War.
- October 10 – The Ungarian commander Ciubăr Vodă briefly becomes Prince of Moldavia after the death of Petru III, and governs until Alexăndrel of Moldavia takes the throne in December.
- October 20 – After three days of fighting at the Battle of Kosovo, Hungarian forces under John Hunyadi are defeated by the larger Ottoman force commanded by the Sultan Murad II
- October – Vlad III the Impaler becomes reigning Prince of Wallachia for two months, before being deposed in November by Vladislav II of Wallachia.
- November 1 - On the day that had been scheduled for England to transfer its territory in France at Le Mans, Maine and Anjou back to French control, English diplomats Nicholas Molyneux, Osbert Mundford and Thomas Direhill meet at Le Mans with the French representatives Guilaume Cousinot II and Jean Havart. However, Fulk Eyton and Sir Matthew Gough, who had been empowered by King Henry VI of England to make the transfer, deliberately avoid attending and the English commissioners declare that no transfer will be made until just compensation will be made to Englishmen who are losing their land. Cousinot and Havart renew their demands for transfer to take place as scheduled and nothing is accomplished.
- November - In Vietnam, a rebellion led by chieftains in Tuyên Quang against King Lê Nhân Tông of the Lê dynasty was defeated.
- December 4 – Swedish troops attack Gotland again and climb the walls of the city's capital, Visby, making a surprise attack. Eric of Pomerania flees to the fortress of Visborg.
- December 15 – Jonas, a Russian bishop, is installed by the Council of Russian Bishops in Moscow, as Metropolitan of Kiev and All Rus. The event marks the independence of the Russian Orthodox Church because the election of Jonas is made without the approval of the Ecumenical Patriarchate of Constantinople as this is without the consent of the Patriarch of Constantinople, it signifies the beginning of an effectively independent church structure in the Grand Duchy of Moscow.
- December 20 – Pope Nicholas V appoints Rudolf of Diepholt, Bishop of Utrecht, as cardinal.

==== Date unknown ====
- Roman II flees to Poland, when an army sent by John Hunyadi, and led by Csupor de Monoszló, comes to put Petru on the throne of Moldavia. Petru dies suddenly, and Csupor takes on the throne for two months, as Ciubăr Vodă.
- After a long episode of drought, flood, locust infestation and famine in Ming dynasty China since the year 1434, these natural afflictions finally wane, and agriculture and commerce return to a state of normality.
- The Vatican Library is founded by Pope Nicholas V.

=== 1449 ===
==== January–March ====
- January 2 – King Henry VI of England summons the members of parliament, directing them to assemble on February 12 at Westminster.
- January 6 – Constantine XI Palaiologos is crowned Byzantine Emperor at Mistra; he will be the last in a line of rulers that can be traced to the founding of Rome.
- February 12 –The English Parliament is opened by King Henry VI at Westminster for a five month session.
- February – Alexăndrel seizes the throne of Moldavia, with the support of the boyars.
- March 24 – Hundred Years' War: English forces capture Fougères in Brittany.

==== April–June ====
- April 7 – The last Antipope, Felix V, abdicates.
- April 19 – Pope Nicholas V is elected by the Council of Basel.
- April 25 – The Council of Basel dissolves itself.
- May – An English privateering fleet led by Robert Wennington challenges ships of the Hanseatic League.
- May 14 – Second Siege of Sfetigrad (1449): The Albanian garrison surrenders and the Ottomans seize the fortress.
- May 20 – Battle of Alfarrobeira: King Afonso V of Portugal defeats the forces of Peter, Duke of Coimbra.
- June 4 – Erik of Pomerania, formerly the King of Sweden, Denmark and Norway, hands over possession of the island of Gotland to the Swedish invaders.
- June 8 – The Pas de la Bergère tournament, later the subject of a poem by Louis de Beauvau, finishes after six days at Tarascon on the island of Jarnègues at the estate of the Duke René of Anjou.
- June 18 – Mary of Guelders arrives in Scotland at Leith after being escorted from the Duchy of Burgundy to Scotland following her selection by Lord Crichton

==== July–September ====
- July 3 – King James II of Scotland marries Mary of Guelders at Holyrood Abbey in Edinburgh.
- July 6 – The Ambrosian Republic of Milan defeats the armies of the Swiss canton of Uri at the Battle of Castione in what is now Switzerland.
- July 16 – The English Parliament closes and King Henry VI gives royal assent to numerous acts passed during its five-month session. Becoming law are the Importation Act, a 7-year ban on the import of Netherlands merchandise from Holland, Zeeland and Brabant, and the Distress Act, making it a felony "for any Welsh or Lancashire man to take other men, their goods or chattels, under colour of distress, where they have no cause."
- July 20 – News arrives at the imperial court of the Emperor Yingzong of China of a Mongol invasion from the north, led by the Khagan Esen Taishi. Yingzong orders the dispatch of 45,000 soldiers from the Beijing garrison, led by four generals, to advance to Datong and Xuanfu to guard the border.
- July – Hundred Years' War: The French invade Normandy.
- August 1 – After getting word that the Mongols had launched a large-scale invasion at Datong, China's Emperor Yingzong decides to personally lead the Beijing garrison into war, despite the protests of his War Minister Kuang Ye.
- August 3 – The Emperor Yingzong designates his younger brother, Zhu Qiyu, to administer the Chinese Empire.
- August 13 – First Margrave War: Margrave Albrecht takes Lichtenau Fortress from Nuremberg.
- September 1 – Battle of Tumu Fortress: The Oirat Mongols defeat the Ming dynasty army, and capture the Emperor Xingzong of China on September 3. The Emperor is officially deposed, while his brother Zhu Qiyu ascends as the Jingtai Emperor the next year.

==== October–December ====
- October 12 – Prince Alexăndrel is replaced as Prince of Moldavia by Bogdan II.
- October 29 – The French recapture Rouen from the English.

== Births ==
1440

- January 22: Ivan III of Russia (d. 1505)
- February 13: Hartmann Schedel, German physician (d. 1514)
- date unknown: Clara Tott, German court singer (d. 1520)

1441

- February 9 – Ali-Shir Nava'i, Central Asian poet, politician and writer (d. 1501)
- March 24 – Ernest, Elector of Saxony, German ruler of Saxony (d. 1486)
- June 25 – Federico I Gonzaga, Marquess of Mantua (1478–1484) (d. 1484)
- June 27 – John III, Count of Nassau-Weilburg, German nobleman (d. 1480)
- July 23 – Danjong of Joseon, King of Joseon (d. 1457)
- November 11 – Charlotte of Savoy, French queen (d. 1483)

1442

- April 13 – Henry IV of Neuhaus, High Treasurer of Bohemia (1485–1503), Burgrave of Prague Castle (1503–1507) (d. 1507)
- April 15 – John Paston, English noble (d. 1479)
- April 28 – King Edward IV of England, King of England from 4 March 1461 until 3 October 1470, and again from 11 April 1471 to 9 April 1483 (d. 1483)
- July 3 – Emperor Go-Tsuchimikado of Japan (d. 1500)
- July 15 – Boček IV of Poděbrady, Bohemian nobleman, eldest son of King George of Podebrady (d. 1496)
- September 8 – John de Vere, 13th Earl of Oxford (d. 1513)
- September 27 – John de la Pole, 2nd Duke of Suffolk (d. 1492)
- date unknown
  - Ahmad Zarruq, Moroccan scholar and Sufi sheikh (d. 1493)
  - Tamás Bakócz, Hungarian archbishop (d. 1521)
  - Vannozza dei Cattanei, mistress of Pope Alexander VI

1443

- January 27 – Albert III, Duke of Saxony (d. 1500)
- February 2 – Elisabeth of Bavaria, Electress of Saxony (d. 1484)
- February 12 – Giovanni II Bentivoglio, Italian noble (d. 1508)
- February 23 – Matthias Corvinus, of Hungary (d. 1490)
- May 17 – Edmund, Earl of Rutland, brother of Kings Edward IV of England and Richard III of England (d. 1460)
- May 29 – Victor, Duke of Münsterberg, Reichsgraf, Duke of Münsterberg and Opava, Count of Glatz (d. 1500)
- May 31 or 1441 – Margaret Beaufort, Countess of Richmond and Derby, English noble, mother of King Henry VII, grandmother of King Henry VIII of England (d. 1509)
- June 29 – Anthony Browne, English knight (d. 1506)
- September 9 – Muhammad Jaunpuri (d. 1505)
- November 10 – Adolf III of Nassau-Wiesbaden-Idstein, Germany noble (d. 1511)
- December 1 – Magdalena of France, French princess and regent of Navarre (d. 1495)
- December 5 – Pope Julius II (d. 1513)
- probable
  - Piero del Pollaiuolo, Italian painter (d. 1496)
  - Ygo Gales Galama, Frisian warlord and freedom fighting rebel (d. 1492)

1444

- January 24 – Galeazzo Maria Sforza, Duke of Milan (d. 1476)
- March 15 – Francesco Gonzaga, Catholic cardinal (d. 1483)
- April 22 – Elizabeth of York, Duchess of Suffolk (d. 1503)
- May 29 – Otto III, Duke of Pomerania-Stettin (1460–1464) (d. 1464)
- June 14 – Nilakantha Somayaji, Indian astronomer-mathematician (d. 1544)
- June 28 – Charlotte, Queen of Cyprus (d. 1487)
- October 18 – John de Mowbray, 4th Duke of Norfolk (d. 1476)
- date unknown – Donato Bramante, Italian architect (d. 1514)

1445

- March 16 – Johann Geiler von Kaisersberg, Swiss-born priest (d. 1510)
- April 4 – Wiguleus Fröschl of Marzoll, Bishop of Passau (1500–1517) (d. 1517)
- October 25 – Fulk Bourchier, 10th Baron FitzWarin, English baron (d. 1479)
- October 31 – Hedwig, Abbess of Quedlinburg, Princess-Abbess of Quedlinburg (d. 1511)
- December 11 – Eberhard I, Duke of Württemberg (d. 1496)
- date unknown – Albert Brudzewski, Polish astronomer (d. 1497)
- probable – Nicolas Chuquet, French mathematician
- approximate – Sandro Botticelli, Italian painter (d. 1510)

1446

- April 18 – Ippolita Maria Sforza, Italian noble (d. 1484)
- May 3
  - Frederick I of Liegnitz, Duke of Chojnów and Strzelin from 1453 (d. 1488)
  - Margaret of York, duchess consort of Burgundy by marriage to Charles the Bold (d. 1503)
- August 14 – Andrey Bolshoy, Russian royal (d. 1493)
- December 26 – Charles de Valois, Duke de Berry, French noble (d. 1472)
- date unknown – Edmund de Ros, 10th Baron de Ros, English politician (d. 1508)
- probable
  - Alexander Agricola, Flemish composer (d. 1506)
  - William Grocyn, English scholar (d. 1519)
  - Pietro Perugino, Italian painter (d. 1524)

1447

- February 1 – Eberhard II, Duke of Württemberg (d. 1504)
- February 4 – Lodovico Lazzarelli, Italian poet (d. 1500)
- April 5 – Catherine of Genoa, Italian author and nurse (d. 1510)
- April 17 – Baptista Mantuanus, poet and carmelite (d. 1516)
- June 27 – Jean IV de Rieux, Breton noble and Marshal (d. 1518)
- July 5 – Costanzo I Sforza, Italian noble (d. 1483)
- September 10 – Paolo da San Leocadio, Italian painter in Spain (d. 1520)
- October 30 – Lucas Watzenrode, Prince-Bishop of Warmia (d. 1512)
- December 3 – Bayezid II, Ottoman Sultan (d. 1512)
- December 9 – Chenghua Emperor of China (d. 1487)
- December 15 – Albert IV, Duke of Bavaria (d. 1508)
- date unknown
  - Piero Capponi, Italian soldier and statesman (d. 1496)
  - Philippe de Commines, Flemish historian (d. 1511)
  - Catherine of Genoa, Catholic mystic (d. 1510)
- probable
  - Giovanni Antonio Amadeo, Italian sculptor (d. 1522)

1448

- February 14 – Nannina de' Medici, Florentine member of the de' Medici family (d. 1493)
- March 20 – Marie of Savoy, Countess of Saint-Pol, Luxembourgish noble (d. 1475)
- July 14 – Philip, Elector Palatine (d. 1508)
- September 7 – Henry, Count of Württemberg-Montbéliard (1473–1482) (d. 1519)
- October 31 – Władysław II of Płock, Polish noble (d. 1462)
- November 4 – King Alphonso II of Naples (d. 1495)
- December 12 – John Talbot, 3rd Earl of Shrewsbury, English Earl (d. 1473)
- date unknown
  - Baeda Maryam of Ethiopia (d. 1478)
  - Nicholas I, Duke of Lorraine (d. 1473)
  - Suor Barbara Ragnoni, Italian painter (d. 1533)

1449

- January 1 – Lorenzo de' Medici, Italian statesman (d. 1492)
- January 17 – Osanna of Mantua, Italian Dominican tertiary (d. 1505)
- February 7 – Adriana of Nassau-Siegen, consort of Count Philip I of Hanau-Münzenberg (d. 1477)
- April 27 – Asakura Ujikage, 8th head of the Asakura clan of Japan (d. 1486)
- August 10 – Bona of Savoy, Duchess of Savoy (d. 1503)
- September 20 – Philipp I, Count of Hanau-Münzenberg, German noble (d. 1500)
- October 21 – George Plantagenet, 1st Duke of Clarence, brother of Edward IV of England and Richard III of England (d. 1478)
- November 11 – Catherine of Poděbrady, Hungarian Queen (d. 1464)
- November 14 – Sidonie of Poděbrady, Bohemian princess, duchess consort of Saxony (d. 1510)
- December 6 – Dorotea Gonzaga, Italian noble (d. 1467)
- date unknown
  - Aldus Manutius, Italian printer
  - Archibald Douglas, 5th Earl of Angus (d. 1513)
  - Axayacatl, Aztec ruler of Tenochtitlan (d. 1481)
  - Domenico Gagini, Italian sculptor (d. 1492)
  - Domenico Ghirlandaio, Italian artist (d. 1494)
  - Magnus Hundt, German physician and theologian (d. 1519)
  - Margaret of Thuringia, Electress consort of Brandenburg (d. 1501)
- probable
  - Ilham Ghali khan of Kazan Khanate, (d. 1490)
  - Srimanta Sankardeva, Assamese scholar and religious figure (d. c. 1568)
  - Mandukhai Khatun, Mongolian queen

== Deaths ==
1440

- March 9: Frances of Rome, Italian Benedictine nun and saint (b. 1384)
- March 20: Sigismund Kęstutaitis, Grand Duke of Lithuania (b. 1365)
- April 2: Giovanni Vitelleschi, Italian Roman Catholic bishop and soldier
- April 6: Henry Wardlaw, Scottish church leader
- September 20: Frederick I, Elector of Brandenburg (b. 1371)
- September 30: Reginald Grey, 3rd Baron Grey de Ruthyn, English soldier and politician
- October 12: Ginevra d'Este (b. 1419)
- October 26: Gilles de Rais, French soldier (b. 1404)
- November 13: Joan Beaufort, Countess of Westmoreland
- date unknown:
  - Itzcóatl, Aztec Tlatoani (ruler) of Tenochtitlan
  - Uwaifiokun, Oba of Benin
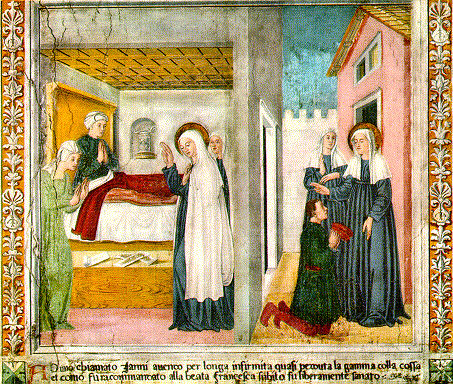
Saint Frances of Rome

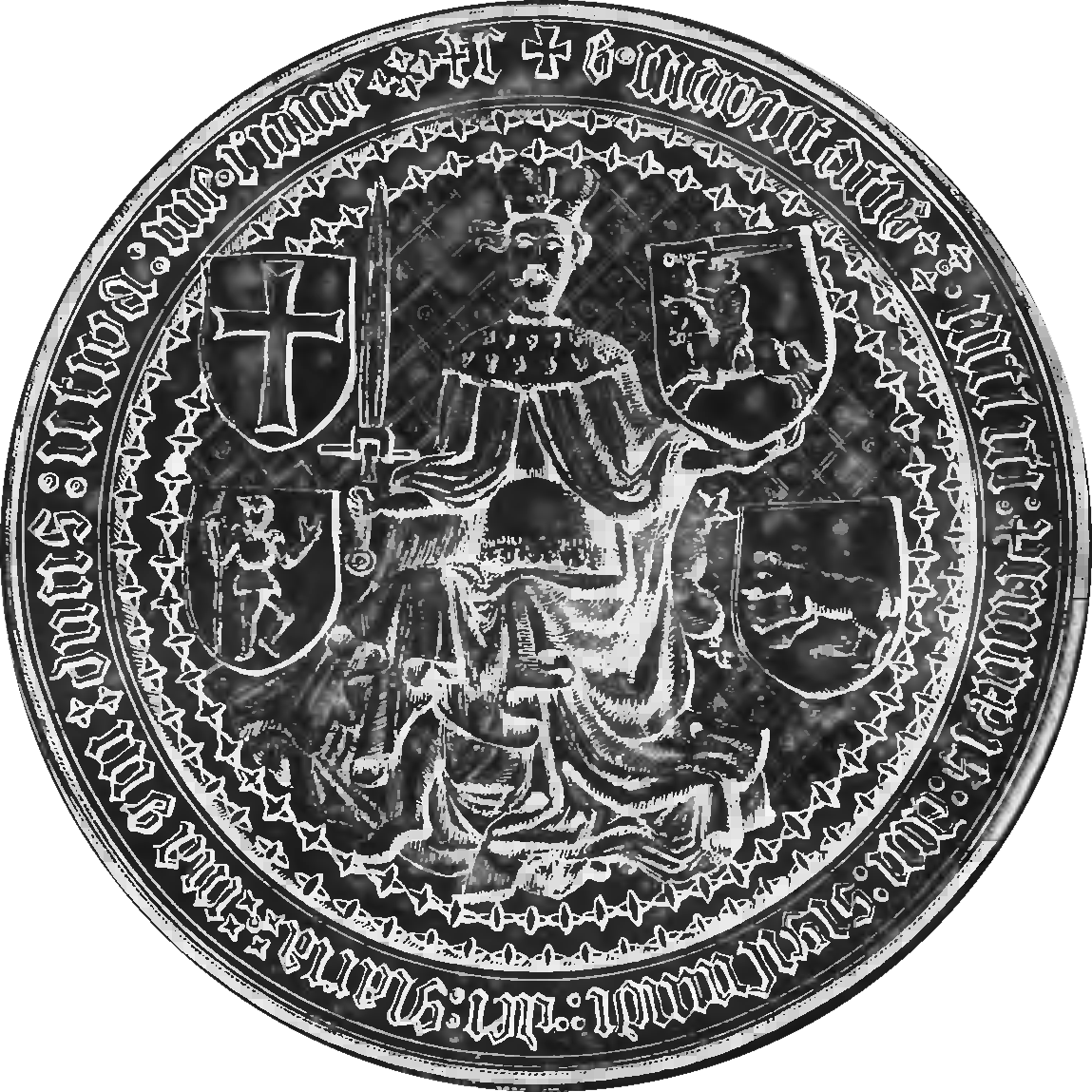
Sigismund Kęstutaitis

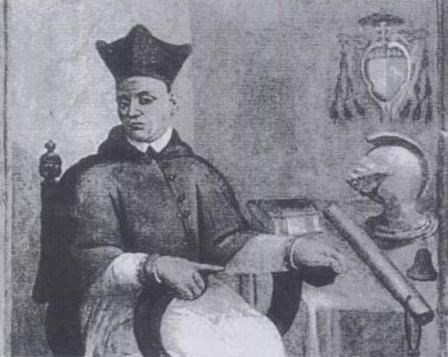
Giovanni Vitelleschi

1441

- March 8 – Margaret of Burgundy, Duchess of Bavaria
- April 1 – Blanche I of Navarre, Queen of Navarre (1425–1441) and Regent of Sicily (1404–1405 and 1408–1415)
- June 14 – Corrado IV Trinci, former lord of Foligno
- July 9 – Jan van Eyck, Dutch painter
- July 12 – Kyōgoku Takakazu, Japanese noble and vassal of Ashikaga Yoshinori
- July 12 – Ashikaga Yoshinori, Japanese shōgun (b. 1394)
- September 25 – Akamatsu Mitsusuke, Japanese samurai
- October 24 – Adolf, Duke of Bavaria (b. 1434)
- October 27 – Margery Jourdemayne, Englishwoman executed for treasonable witchcraft
- November 18 – Roger Bolingbroke, English cleric, astronomer, astrologer, magister and alleged necromancer
- December 26 – Niccolò III d'Este, Marquis of Ferrara (b. 1383)

1442

- August 29 – John VI, Duke of Brittany (b. 1389)
- September 25 – Robert de Morley, 6th Baron Morley, Lord of Morley Saint Botolph (b. 1418)
- October 18 – Infante João of Portugal (b. 1400)
- November 14 – Yolande of Aragon, politically active French noblewoman (b. 1384)
- December 18 – Pierre Cauchon, French Catholic bishop (b. 1371)
- December 19 – Elizabeth of Luxembourg (b. 1409)
- date unknown
  - Al-Maqrizi, Egyptian Arab historian
  - Ahmed Shah, Sultan of Gujarat
  - Nguyễn Trãi, Vietnamese Confucian scholar.

1443

- January 16 – Erasmo of Narni, Italian mercenary (b. 1370)
- January 28 – Robert le Maçon, Chancellor of France
- February – Guidantonio da Montefeltro, count of Urbino (b. 1377)
- March 24 – James Douglas, 7th Earl of Douglas (b. 1371)
- April 12 – Henry Chichele, Archbishop of Canterbury
- May – John II, Count of Nassau-Siegen
- May 9 – Niccolò Albergati, Italian cardinal and diplomat (b. 1373)
- June 5 – Ferdinand the Holy Prince of Portugal (b. 1402)
- August 16 – Ashikaga Yoshikatsu, Japanese shōgun (b. 1434)
- September 18 – Lewis of Luxembourg, Archbishop of Rouen
- date unknown – Infante Diogo, Constable of Portugal
  - Jelena Balšić, Serbian duchess (b. 1366)
- probable – Zeami Motokiyo, Japanese actor and playwright (b. 1363)

1444

- January 8 – Wilhelm II, Count of Henneberg-Schleusingen (b. 1415)
- February 14 – Henriette, Countess of Montbéliard, regent of Württemberg (b. 1387)
- March 9 – Leonardo Bruni, Italian humanist (b. 1374)
- April 26 – Robert Campin, Flemish painter (b. 1378)
- May 20 – Saint Bernardino of Siena, Italian Franciscan missionary (b. 1380)
- May 27 – John Beaufort, 1st Duke of Somerset, English military leader (b. 1404)
- October 15 – Niccolò Piccinino, Italian mercenary (b. 1386)
- November 10 – King Władysław III of Poland (in battle) (b. 1424)
- November 25 – Martin Gouge, French chancellor
- date unknown – Pier Paolo Vergerio the Elder, Italian humanist, statesman, and canon lawyer

1445

- January 19 – Antonio Correr, Venetian cardinal (b. 1359)
- February 19 – Leonor of Aragon, queen of Portugal (b. 1402)
- April 7 – Louis VIII, Duke of Bavaria, German noble (b. 1403)
- May 15 – Johanna van Polanen, Dutch noblewoman (b. 1392)
- June 5 – Leonel Power, English composer
- July 15 – Joan Beaufort, Queen of Scotland
- August 2 – Oswald von Wolkenstein, Austrian composer (b. 1377)
- date unknown – Olug Moxammat of Kazan, Khan of Kazan

1446

- April 15 – Filippo Brunelleschi, Italian architect (b. 1377)
- May 9 – Mary of Enghien, Queen of Naples (b. 1367)
- May 24 – Ambroise de Loré, Baron of Ivry (b. 1396)
- June 11 – Henry Beauchamp, 1st Duke of Warwick, English nobleman (b. 1425)
- December 28 – Antipope Clement VIII
- February 2 – Vittorino da Feltre, Italian humanist (b. 1378)
- date unknown – Nuno Tristão, Portuguese explorer

1447

- February 23
  - Pope Eugene IV (b. 1383)
  - Humphrey, Duke of Gloucester (b. 1390)
- March 6 – Colette of Corbie, French abbess and saint in the Catholic Church (b. 1381)
- March 13 – Shahrukh Mirza, ruler of Persia and Transoxonia (b. 1377)
- March 31 – Robert Long, English politician (b. 1390)
- April 11 – Henry Beaufort, Cardinal, Lord Chancellor of England (b. 1377)
- April 22 – Yaqub al-Charkhi, Sufism (b. 1359)
- May 1 – Louis VII, Duke of Bavaria-Ingolstadt (b. 1368)
- May 12 – Hein Hoyer, German politician (b. 1380)
- July 6 – António Martins de Chaves, Catholic cardinal (b. 1390)
- July 9 – Gruffudd Vychan, Welsh knight (b. 1390)
- July 13 – Stephen II of Moldavia, Prince of Moldavia (b. 1410)
- August 5 – John Holland, 2nd Duke of Exeter, English nobleman and military commander (b. 1395)
- August 9 – Konrad IV the Elder, Polish priest (b. 1380)
- August 13 – Filippo Maria Visconti, Duke of Milan (b. 1392)
- October 31 – Tommaso Bellacci, Italian Roman Catholic professed member of the Third Order of Saint Francis (b. 1370)
- November 17 – Euphemia of Münsterberg, German sovereign (b. 1385)
- November 21 – Biagio Molino, Roman Catholic patriarch (b. 1380)
- December – Vlad II Dracul, Prince of Wallachia, and his son Mircea II

1448

- January 6 – Christopher of Bavaria, King of Denmark, Norway and Sweden (b. 1418)
- June 18 – Elizabeth de Beauchamp, Baroness Bergavenny, English baroness (b. 1415)
- September 23 – Adolph I, Duke of Cleves (b. 1373)
- October – Carlo II Tocco, ruler of Epirus
- October 12 – Zhu Quan, Prince of Ning, Chinese military commander, historian and playwright (b. 1378)
- October 31 – John VIII Palaeologus, Byzantine Emperor (b. 1390)
- date unknown
  - Petru III of Moldavia

1449

- January 4 – Cecilia of Brandenburg, Duchess of Brunswick-Wolfenbüttel (b. c.1405)
- January 21 – Giovanni Berardi, Archbishop of Taranto (b. 1380)
- February 2 – Ibn Hajar al-Asqalani, Islamic scholar (b. 1372)
- March – Dolce dell'Anguillara, Italian condottiero (b. 1401)
- May – Alexander of Islay, Earl of Ross, Lord of the Isles
- May 20 (at the Battle of Alfarrobeira)
  - Álvaro Vaz de Almada, 1st Count of Avranches
  - Peter, Duke of Coimbra (b. 1392)
- June 1 – Polissena Sforza, Lady of Rimini (b. 1428)
- August 13 – Louis IV, Elector Palatine (b. 1424)
- October 27 – Ulugh Beg, Timurid ruler and astronomer (b. 1394)
- October 31 – Elisabeth of Brandenburg, Duchess of Brzeg-Legnica and Cieszyn, German princess (b. 1403)
- November 19 – Kunigunde of Sternberg, first spouse of the King George of Podebrady (b. 1425)
- December 24 – Walter Bower, Scottish chronicler (b. 1385)
