= 1444 =

1444 in various calendars
- Gregorian calendar: 1444; MCDXLIV
- Ab urbe condita: 2197
- Armenian calendar: 893; ԹՎ ՊՂԳ
- Assyrian calendar: 6194
- Balinese saka calendar: 1365–1366
- Bengali calendar: 850–851
- Berber calendar: 2394
- English Regnal year: 22 Hen. 6 – 23 Hen. 6
- Buddhist calendar: 1988
- Burmese calendar: 806
- Byzantine calendar: 6952–6953
- Chinese calendar: 癸亥年 (Water Pig); 4141 or 3934 — to — 甲子年 (Wood Rat); 4142 or 3935
- Coptic calendar: 1160–1161
- Discordian calendar: 2610
- Ethiopian calendar: 1436–1437
- Hebrew calendar: 5204–5205
- Hindu calendars
- Vikram Samvat: 1500–1501
- Shaka Samvat: 1365–1366
- Kali Yuga: 4544–4545
- Holocene calendar: 11444
- Igbo calendar: 444–445
- Iranian calendar: 822–823
- Islamic calendar: 847–848
- Japanese calendar: Kakitsu 4 / Bun'an 1 (文安元年)
- Javanese calendar: 1359–1360
- Julian calendar: 1444; MCDXLIV
- Korean calendar: 3777
- Minguo calendar: 468 before ROC 民前468年
- Nanakshahi calendar: −24
- Thai solar calendar: 1986–1987
- Tibetan calendar: ཆུ་མོ་ཕག་ལོ་ (female Water-Boar); 1570 or 1189 or 417 — to — ཤིང་ཕོ་བྱི་བ་ལོ་ (male Wood-Rat); 1571 or 1190 or 418

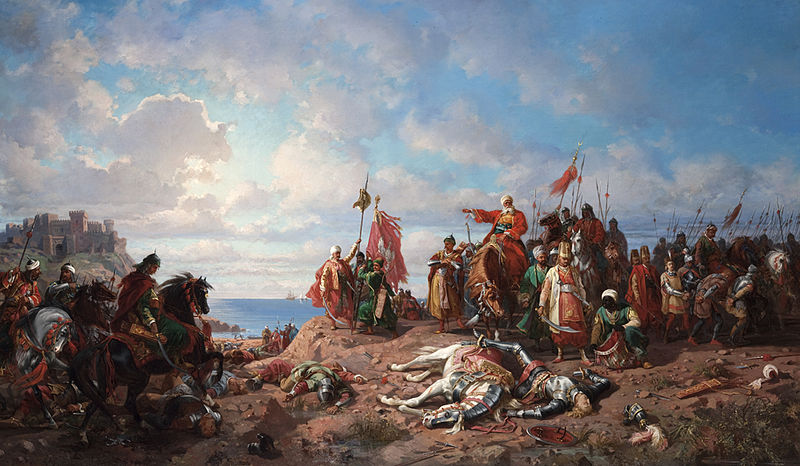
November 10: Outnumbered Christian crusaders overwhelmed by Ottoman Muslims at the Battle of Varna after King Wladyslaw leads attack on the camp of the Sultan Murad. (painting by Stanisław Chlebowski.)

1444 (MCDXLIV) was a leap year starting on Wednesday of the Julian calendar, the 1444th year of the Common Era (CE) and Anno Domini (AD) designations, the 444th year of the 2nd millennium, the 44th year of the 15th century, and the 5th year of the 1440s decade. As of the start of 1444, the Gregorian calendar was 9 days ahead of the Julian calendar, which was the dominant calendar of the time.

== Events ==
=== January–March ===
- January 2 – The Battle of Kunovica is fought between the Christian crusaders, led by John Hunyadi, and the Muslim armies of the Ottoman Empire in what is now Serbia. After having retreated 10 days earlier following their loss in the Battle of Zlatitsa, Hunyadi and King Wladyslaw III of Hungary defeat the Ottoman forces and take several of their commanders as prisoners of war, including Mahmud Bey, son-in-law of the Sultan Murad II.
- February 15 – Stjepan Vukčić Kosača, the Grand Duke of Bosnia, signs a treaty with the King Alfonso of Naples, agreeing to become his vassal in exchange for help against the Republic of Venice.
- March 2 – The League of Lezhë, an alliance of Albanian principalities, is established in Lezhë; George Kastrioti Skanderbeg is proclaimed commander of the Albanian resistance.

=== April–June ===
- April 15 – King Wladyslaw of Hungary appears before the Országgyűlés, the Diet of Hungary in Buda, and pledges to the legislators present that he will lead the attack against the Turkish Muslims in the summer.
- April 18 – In Sicily, the University of Catania receives papal recognition from Pope Eugene IV, ten years after its founding on October 19, 1434.
- May 22 – The Treaty of Tours, signed between England and France, secures a truce in the Hundred Years' War for five years.
- June 15 – Cosimo de' Medici founds a public library at San Marco, Florence.
- June 29 – Battle of Torvioll: Skanderbeg defeats an Ottoman army.

=== July–September ===
- July 22 – Oddantonio da Montefeltro, the Duke of Urbino, an independent duchy in what is now the Le Marche region of Italy, is assassinated at his palace by conspirators, who also murder his counsellors Manfredo dei Pio da Carpi and Tommaso di Guido dell'Agnello. He is succeeded by his half-brother, Federico da Montefeltro.
- August 6 – A Portuguese fleet of caravels, led by Lançarote de Freitas, lands 235 slaves at Algarve, Portugal.
- August 15 – The Peace of Szeged is signed between the Turkish Ottoman Empire and Hungary.
- August 22 – Đurađ Branković reclaims Serbia from Ottoman control after the signing of the peace of Szeged, and Wladyslaw of Hungary offers the throne of Bulgaria to John Hunyadi.
- August 26 – Old Zürich War – Battle of St. Jakob an der Birs: Charles VII of France, seeking to send away troublesome troops made idle by the truce with England, sends his son (the Dauphin Louis) with a large army into Switzerland, to support the claims of Frederick III, Holy Roman Emperor. The massively outnumbered Swiss force is destroyed in this battle, but inflict such casualties on the French that they withdraw.
- August – After making peace with the Karamanids, Ottoman Sultan Murad II abdicates in favor of his son Mehmed II.
- September 9 – General Alvise Loredan, commander of the Venetian and Papal States squadrons in the Crusade of Varna, receives instructions from the Republic of Venice to open secret negotiations with the Ottoman Sultan and to abstain from offensive actions until further notice. Loredan is soon faced with defending an Ottoman invasion of Europe.
- September 18 – As the Crusade of Varna resumes, the 16,000 Christian soldiers under the command of Wladyslaw and Hunyadi begin crossing over the Danube river near Belgrade and complete their crossing into Ottoman Muslim territory in Bulgaria.

=== October–December ===
- October 20 – As the Christian crusaders begin their approach to the Black Sea, the former Ottoman Sultan Murad II comes out of retirement at Bursa to assume command of the Ottoman troops.
- November 10 – Battle of Varna: The crusading forces of King Władysław III of Poland and Hungary are defeated by the Turks, under Sultan Murad II. Władysław is killed, ending the Jagiellonian Union of Hungary and Poland.
- December 24 – Ottoman General Kasım Pasha is defeated in the Battle of Melštica near Sofia by Christian troops who had survived the Battle of Varna.

=== Date unknown ===
- Constantine XI Palaiologos, as ruler of the Despotate of the Morea, invades the Duchy of Athens (at this time under Florentine control), and forces it to pay tribute and return Thebes to the Byzantine Empire.
- Forces of the Sultan of Egypt fail to take Rhodes from the Knights of Rhodes.
- Portuguese explorers reach the mouth of the rivers Senegal and Gambia.
- The first European slave market for the sale of African slaves, the Mercado de Escravos, opens in Lagos, Portugal.
- A serious fire occurs at Old St Paul's Cathedral in London.
- The Iguvine Tablets are discovered at Gubbio, Italy.
- Stephen II of Moldavia takes as co-ruler his step brother Petru, also brother-in-law to John Hunyadi.

== Births ==
- January 24 – Galeazzo Maria Sforza, Duke of Milan (d. 1476)
- March 15 – Francesco Gonzaga, Catholic cardinal (d. 1483)
- April 22 – Elizabeth of York, Duchess of Suffolk (d. 1503)
- May 29 – Otto III, Duke of Pomerania-Stettin (1460–1464) (d. 1464)
- June 14 – Nilakantha Somayaji, Indian astronomer-mathematician (d. 1544)
- June 28 – Charlotte, Queen of Cyprus (d. 1487)
- October 18 – John de Mowbray, 4th Duke of Norfolk (d. 1476)
- date unknown – Donato Bramante, Italian architect (d. 1514)

== Deaths ==
- January 8 – Wilhelm II, Count of Henneberg-Schleusingen (b. 1415)
- February 14 – Henriette, Countess of Montbéliard, regent of Württemberg (b. 1387)
- March 9 – Leonardo Bruni, Italian humanist (b. 1374)
- April 26 – Robert Campin, Flemish painter (b. 1378)
- May 1 – John Meverel, English politician
- May 20 – Saint Bernardino of Siena, Italian Franciscan missionary (b. 1380)
- May 27 – John Beaufort, 1st Duke of Somerset, English military leader (b. 1404)
- October 15 – Niccolò Piccinino, Italian mercenary (b. 1386)
- November 10 – King Władysław III of Poland (in battle) (b. 1424)
- November 25 – Martin Gouge, French chancellor
- date unknown – Pier Paolo Vergerio the Elder, Italian humanist, statesman, and canon lawyer
