= War in Gotland (1448–1449) =

Invasion of Gotland by Sweden in 1448

Date	29 July 1448–18 July 1449
Location	Gotland
Result	See § Aftermath
Territorial changes	Gotland handed over to Denmark.

Belligerents
(History of Sweden (800–1521)) Sweden; Supported by Gutes	Eric of Pomerania; Supported by (Medieval Denmark) Denmark

Commanders and leaders
(History of Sweden (800–1521)) Karl Knutsson (History of Sweden (800–1521)) Magnus Gren (History of Sweden (800–1521)) Birger Trolle	Eric of Pomerania (Medieval Denmark) Christian I (Medieval Denmark) Olof Axelsson

Strength
2,000	Unknown

Casualties and losses
Unknown	Unknown

The War in Gotland (1448–1449) was an invasion of the island of Gotland by King Karl Knutsson in 1448.

== Background ==
When Charles VIII was elected king in 1448, the question of Gotland became all the more evident. Eric of Pomerania, who was previously king of the Kalmar Union, had been exiled to the island, and was now ruling it, which, according to the Swedes, rightfully belonged to Sweden. Eric had also previously taken 7 ships from Stockholm loaded with iron, copper, butter, and hides that were originally going to the Hanseatic states, which made Charles want to take revenge on him.

== Invasion ==
On 29 July 1448, a Swedish force of 2,000 landed on Gotland under the command of Magnus Gren, the commander of Åbo castle, and Birger Trolle. Fortunately for the Swedes, the Gutes gave them their support. According to the Rim Chronicle, the Swedish fleet sailed towards Flensviken, at which Eric managed to repulse the Swedish landing 3 times. In mid-August, the Gotland countryside was fully occupied by the Swedes, Visby was also quickly surrounded by Magnus Gren and the Swedish fleet blockaded all shipments.

On the night of 4 December, the Swedes lead a successful storm of Visby's wall; the majority of the Swedish force managed to climb the walls before the city's alarm was sounded. The storm resulted in Eric having to retreat to Visby's fortress, Visborg. His situation in Visborg was not good and resulted in him quickly engaging in negotiations, which were that he was to give up Gotland and Visborg in exchange for Borgholm, Öland, and monetary compensation.

== Aftermath ==
After the agreement was signed with Eric, Birger sailed back to Sweden in order to inform the king of it, but he was promptly sent back in order to make the Gutes swear allegiance to the king. Eric was invited to the Swedish lords to celebrate New Year's Eve, something that led him to stop the Danish ransom of Visborg, and on New Year's morning, he set fire to the closer parts of the city where the Swedes were quartered. In January 1449, the Gutes formally pledged their allegiance to Charles with the justification that Gotland "formerly belonged to Sweden's crown by right, according to what our chronicle clearly proves, and certificates".

The Swedish invasion of Gotland was not received well in Denmark, and the Danish king had secretly given Eric a better offer, namely three Danish castles on Falster and Lolland and 10,000 guilders in exchange for Visborg. In April, the Danish king arrived on Gotland, and Eric promptly handed over Visborg and headed back to Denmark. Charles proposed that the Gotland issue was to be solved judicially with representatives from the Hanseatic cities, and in the summer, the Swedes prepared to storm Visby. However, nothing came of this, and Magnus Gren signed a truce with Olof Axelsson on 18 July 1449. Danish reinforcements to Gotland solidifed the fact that Gotland had been lost to the Danes.
