= Huerta Real =

Huerta Real, Spain
- Village
- Interactive map of Huerta Real, Spain
- Coordinates: 37°36′22″N 2°44′43″W
- Country: Spain
- Province: Granada
- Municipality: Benamaurel
- Elevation: 680 m (2,230 ft)

Population (2011)
  - Total: 120
- Time zone: UTC+1 (CET)
  - Summer (DST): UTC+2 (CEST)

Huerta Real is a village located in the Benamaurel municipality, province of Granada, Spain. According to the 2020 census (INE), the city has a population of 104 inhabitants.

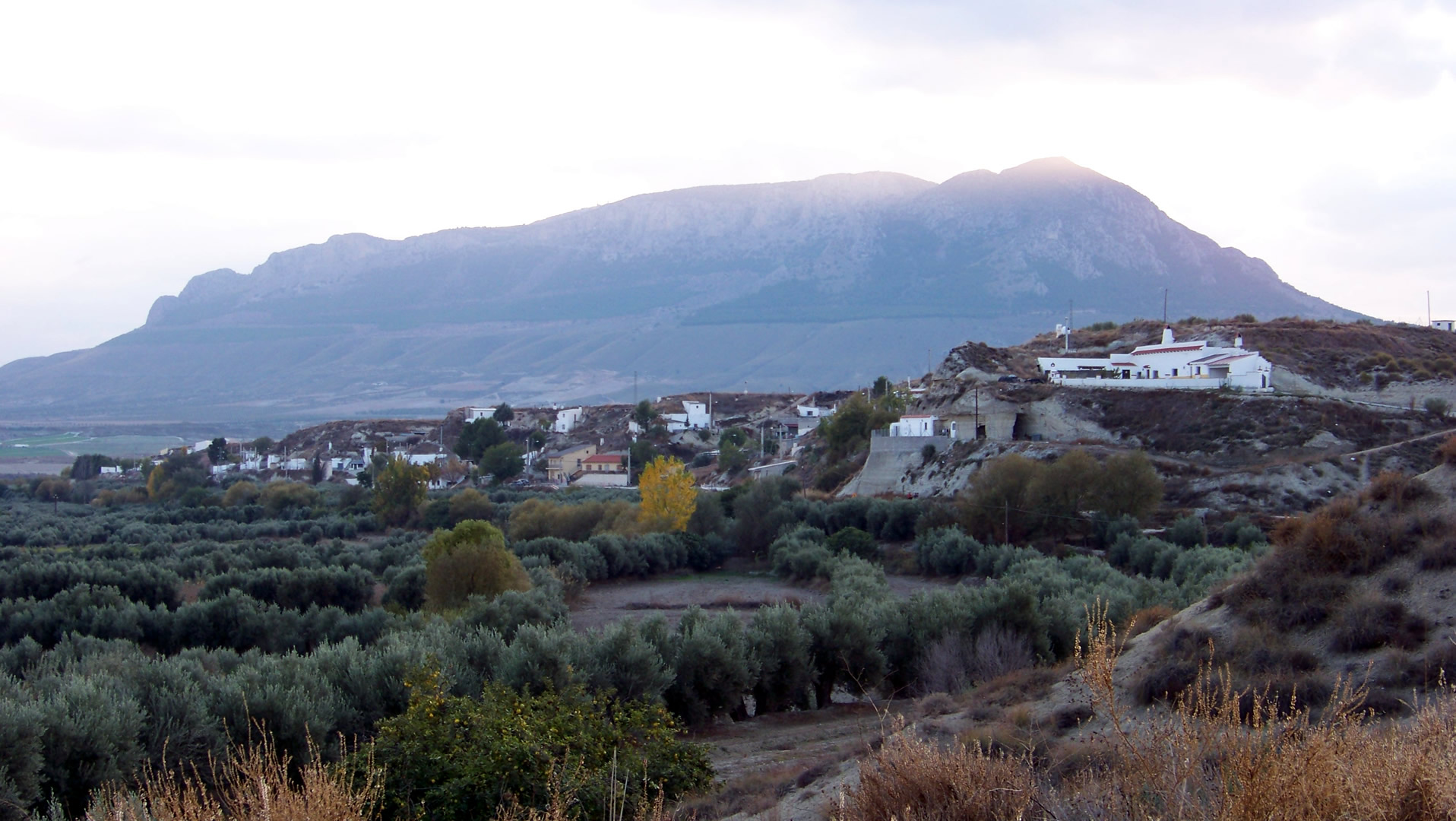
Huerta Real with Jabalcón mountain behind.

It is located by the Guardal River, where Baza and Cúllar rivers join it. Most inhabitants live in cave houses.
