= Battle of Río Verde =

Battle of Río Verde (1448)
- Part of the Spanish Reconquista
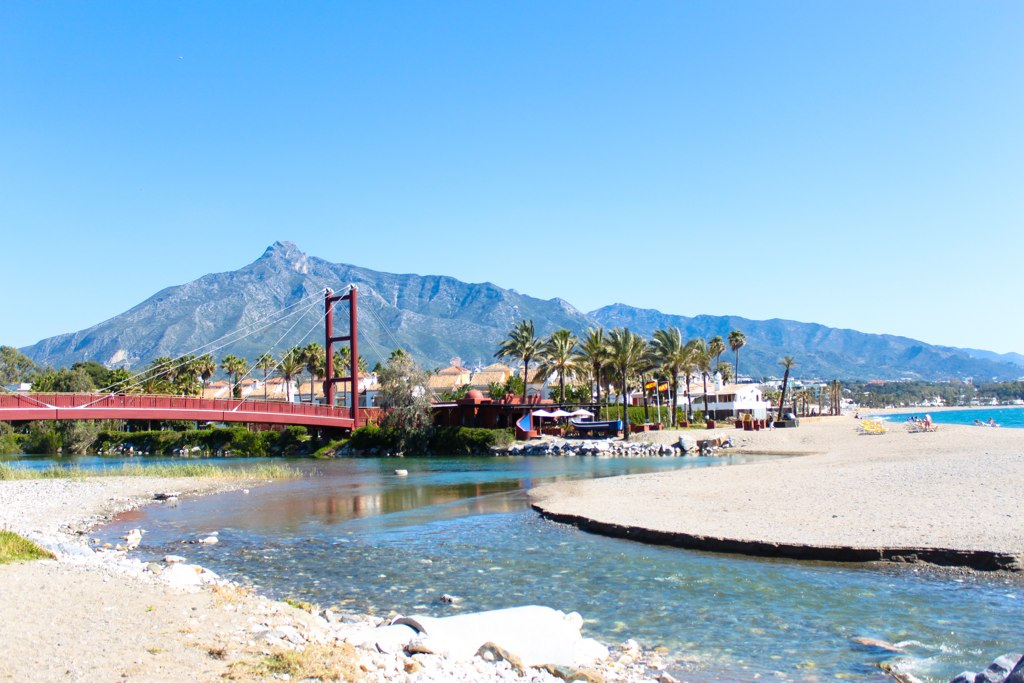
- Río Verde
Date	17 March 1448
Location	Río Verde, near Marbella 36°29′36″N 4°56′43″W
Result	Granadan victory

Belligerents
Crown of Castile	Emirate of Granada

Commanders and leaders
Juan de Saavedra (POW)	Ibrāhīm bin Abd al-Barr; Abū l-Qāsim b. al-Sarrāŷ

Strength
400–600 cavalry	1,500 cavalry

Casualties and losses
All but 4 killed	Unknown

The Battle of Río Verde was a military engagement between the Granadans and the Castilians at the Río Verde near Marbella. The Granadans achieved a resounding victory.

== Background ==
In 1447, taking advantage of Castile political turmoil, the Granadan Sultan, Yusuf V, attacked Castile and restored the lost castles from Castile, including Arenas, Huéscar, Vélez-Blanco, Vélez-Rubio, Benamaurel, and Benzalema. In August of the same year, Yusuf was assassinated, and in September, Muhammad IX took control of Granada. War with Castile continued.

== Battle ==
On March 15, 1448, a Castilian force of 400 or 600 cavalry, attacked the Granadan territory and stole cattle. The Castilians were led by Juan de Saavedra. Two days later, the Castilians advanced through the area of Estepona, towards Marbella, up to Río Verde. Upon retreating, the Castilians were attacked by a force of Granadans consisting of 1,500 cavalry. The Granadans were led by Viziers Ibrāhīm bin Abd al-Barr and Abū l-Qāsim b. al-Sarrāŷ. The Granadans massacred the majority of the force and took Juan as a captive. It is said that only 4 managed to escape the massacre. The Romance "Rio Verde" describes the battle:.

Green River, Green River!__In you are washed so many bodies__Of Christians and Moors__Killed by the harsh sword!__Making your crystalline waves__Shine with red blood.

== Aftermath ==
The ransom amount was estimated at twelve thousand doubloons. Saavedra had to leave two of his daughters as hostages and resort to the help of the King and the Seville council. The impact of this defeat was such that, in addition to inspiring the well-known ballad “Green River, Green River," it forced the Castilian King to propose a truce to the Andalusian emir the following month, which he again rejected. The agreement that al-Aysar did sign was a general suspension of hostilities with Aragon and Navarre on 25 December 1448.

== Sources ==
- Joseph F. O'Callaghan (2014), The Last Crusade in the West, Castile and the Conquest of Granada. University of Pennsylvania Press.
- Giuseppe Di Stefano (1993), Romancero.(I.B. Tauris)
- Aires A. Nascimento & Cristina Almeda Ribero (1991), El Romance Rio Verde: sus Problemas Historíeos y Literarios. Edicoes Cosmos.
