= Tuyên Quang =

Tuyên Quang may refer to:

- Tuyên Quang province, a province in northeastern Vietnam
- Tuyên Quang (city), former provincial city of Tuyên Quang province
