= Illius qui se pro divini =

1442 papal bill by Pope Eugene IV on the Crusades

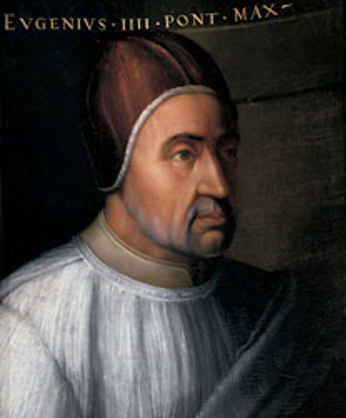
Pope Eugene IV

Illius qui se pro divini is a papal bull issued by Pope Eugene IV in December 1442. Eugene granted plenary indulgence to the knights and friars of the Order of Christ, and all other Christians who fought in the crusade against the Saracens under the leadership of Prince Henry the Navigator. A clause in the bull ensured that the indulgence would be valid even if Henry was not present in the crusade.
