= Suor Barbara Ragnoni =

Italian artist (1448–1533)

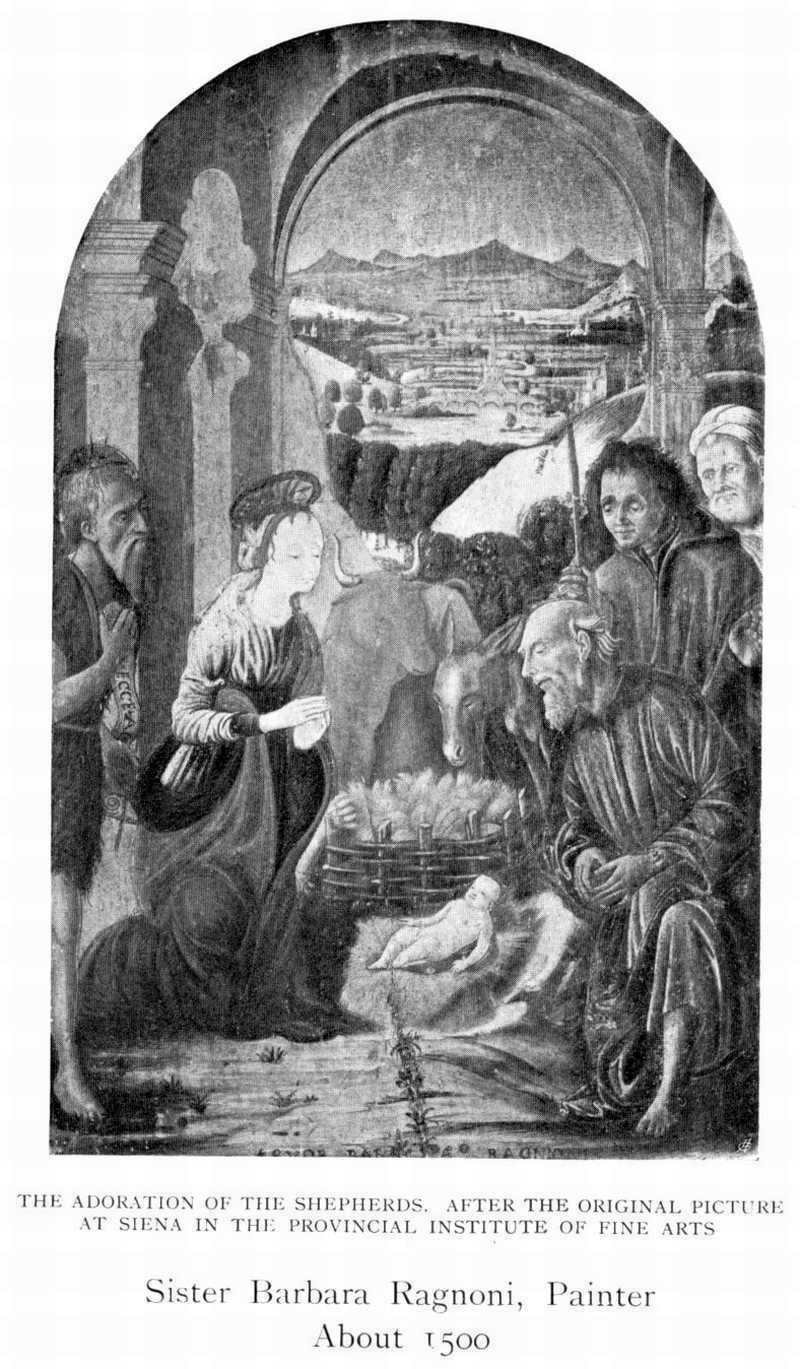
Adoration of the Shepherds in the Fine Arts Museum of Siena

Suor Barbara Ragnoni (1448–1533) was an Italian artist for whom only one work remains extant.

Her signed painting, The Adoration of the Shepherds, is now in the Pinacoeteca of Siena. The style of the painting, with its warm colors, is very much in keeping with the late quattrocento style.
