= Benamaurel =

Coordinates: 37°36′N 2°42′W

Benamaurel, Spain
- village
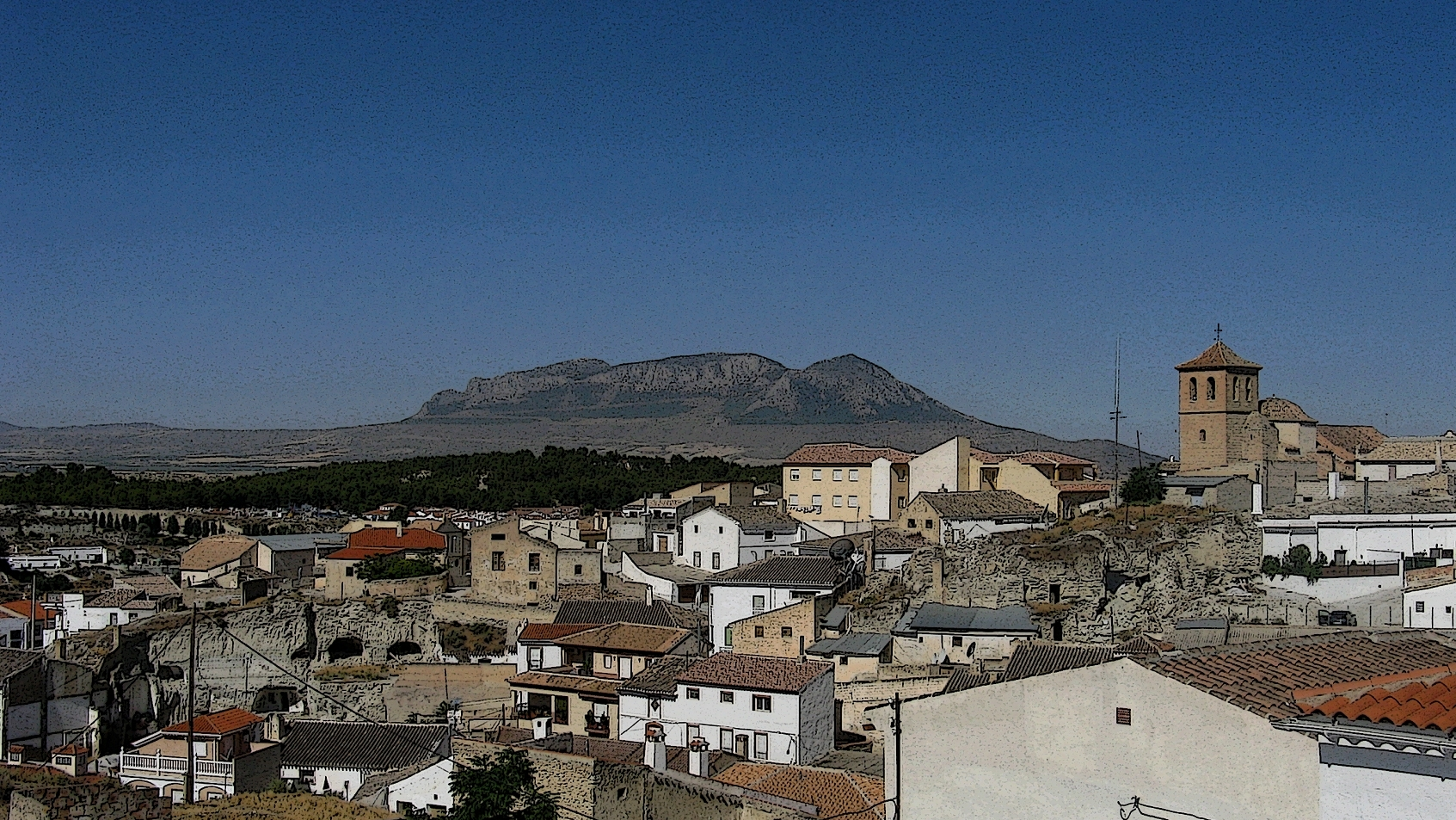

- Flag Coat of arms

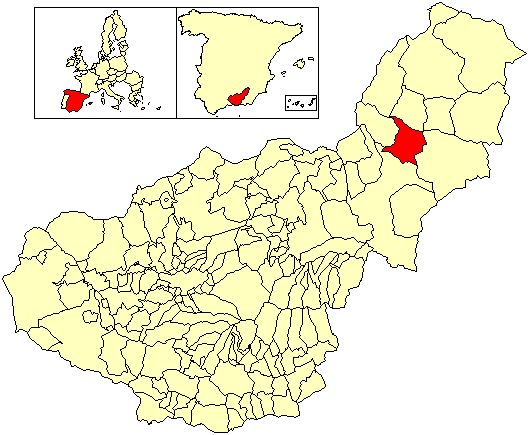
- Location of Benamaurel
- Country: Spain
- Province: Granada
- Municipality: Benamaurel

Area
  - Total: 127 km^{2} (49 sq mi)
- Elevation: 723 m (2,372 ft)

Population (2025-01-01)
  - Total: 2,235
  - Density: 17.6/km^{2} (45.6/sq mi)
- Time zone: UTC+1 (CET)
  - Summer (DST): UTC+2 (CEST)

Benamaurel is a village located in the province of Granada, Spain. According to the 2006 census (INE), the city has a population of 2328 inhabitants. The municipality includes the following localities: Puente Arriba, San Marcos, Cuevas de la Blanca, Huerta Real, Cuevas del Negro y Cuevas de Luna.

There is a 3-day festival of Moros y cristianos held in April. There are other examples of this festival in the Spain and the tradition is being considered for World Heritage status.

There is also a municipal outdoor swimming pool that is open from June through to September.

The nearest large town is Baza, Granada about 20 km south and this is also the route to the main A92N motorway through Granada province to the airports (Granada, Almeria, Murcia and Alicante)

== Public services ==
There is a post office that opens from 8:30 to 10:30 am, the post person making deliveries after then until 2pm. The municipal pool opens the last week of June until the first week of September when the schools return. There is a nursery/primary school and a school serving children up to the age of 16, after which education may be continued in Baza.

There is a market held every Sunday morning. In summer (after the fiesta until the clocks go back), this is held in the square on the way out of Benamaurel to Baza, with it changing location for winter to Place Canada. The stalls are mostly local fruit and vegetables, cheeses, fish with some clothes, shoes and other goods (blankets, bedding) from market sellers who attend markets in other local villages.

During the summer months the town hall (Ayuntamiento) host many free activities for all ages (fitness classes, poetry readings, walks, water-based activities) and organise trips to the coast and theatres in Granada. There are several very competitive bike/run races held at night and there are two well-posted 'tourist' walks into the village environs.

== See also ==
- List of municipalities in Granada
