= List of earthquakes in Poland =

Earthquakes in Poland are a rare phenomenon. Most often they are caused by rock bursts in coal or copper mines. Natural ones appear in the Carpathian Mountains, Sudetes, or in the Trans-European Suture Zone. Sometimes events from other countries are felt in Poland.

== Natural Earthquakes ==
Date	Location	Magnitude	Damage/notes
5 June 1443	Sudetes?	6 (est.)	According to the records in the Jan Długosz chronicle, the earthquake damaged buildings in Kraków and Wrocław killed 30 people. It was the strongest earthquake in the history of Poland. Other research localised the epicenter to Slovakia.
9 July 1662	Tatra Mountains	< 6 (est.)	
26 January 1774	near Racibórz	5 (est.)	
25 August 1785	Wisła	5 (est.)	
3 December 1786	Tresna	5.4 (est.)	Damaged buildings in Kraków
1875	Hrubieszów	3.7	
4 February – 8 March 1932	Płock, Łuków, Kock, Lublin, Bogoria, Jędrzejowo, Małogoszcz	4.0–4.5	Unusual earthquake swarm on the line of the Trans-European Suture Zone; series of small, shallow quakes, causing cracks in buildings and frozen ground. Cracks in the ground were 2 kilometers long and 1-2 centimeters wide.
20 November 2004	Czarny Dunajec	4.7	Damage to buildings including schools and a church
6 January 2012	Żerków	3.8	Small cracks in buildings; unusual quake in aseismic area
10 December 2017	Wodzisław Śląski, Prudnik, Bielsko-Biała	3.4	
6 July 2020	Polkowice	4.9	No structural damage; one of the strongest, instrumental-registered quakes in Poland

== Mining-induced earthquakes ==
Between 2015 and 2019, in Polish mines, 23 strong earthquakes occurred, killing 24 miners and damaging buildings on the surface.

Date	Location	Magnitude	Damage/notes
29 November 1980	Bełchatów Coal Mine	4.7	Cracks in the ground; damaged chimney
20 July 1987	Lubin, Copper Mine	4.8-4.9	Four miners killed,
13 January 2005	KWK Rydułtowy-Anna, Rydułtowy	3.5	
10 March 2013	KGHM O/ZG Rudna, Polkowice	4.6	19 miners rescued from collapsed part of mine
29 November 2016	KGHM O/ZG Rudna, Polkowice	4.4	8 miners killed
23 April 2022	KGHM O/ZG Zofiówka	2.7	10 miners killed, 20 others injured
22 August 2023	Bobrek Coal Mine	3.8	damaged chimney and car in Bytom,
5 October 2023	Staszic Coal Mine, Katowice	3.2	
20 September 2024	Polkowice	3.6	No significant damage or casualties have been reported (1 miner killed), as the tremor was moderate in intensity
27 February 2025	Polkowice	4.7	Multiple people reported V MMI intensity and people further from the epicenter reported I MMI
