= Bull of Union with the Copts =

1442 papal bull

Cantate Domino Latin for 'Sing praises to the Lord' Encyclical of Pope Eugene IV
- Signature date: 4 February 1442
- Subject: Reunited the Roman Catholic and Coptic Orthodox Church
- Text: In Latin

The Bull of Union with the Copts, also known as Cantate Domino after its incipit, was a bull promulgated by Pope Eugene IV at the Ecumenical Council of Florence on 4 February 1442. It was part of an attempt by the Catholic Church to reunite with other Christian groups including the Coptic Church of Egypt. The attempted union with the Copts failed.

The Bull of Union with the Copts denounced Christians who continued to observe the practices of circumcision, the Jewish sabbath and "other legal prescriptions as strangers to the faith of Christ" as practiced by the Copts.
