= Battle of Samobor =

1441 battle in the Kingdom of Hungary

Location	Samobor, Duchy of Slavonia, Kingdom of Hungary (present-day Croatia)
Result	Celje victory

Belligerents
Counts of Celje	Kingdom of Hungary

Commanders and leaders
Ulrich II of Celje; Jan Vitovec	Stjepan Banić

The Battle of Samobor (Croatian: Bitka kod Samobora; Slovenian: Celjsko-Ogrska Vojna) was fought on March 1, 1441, between the forces of Ulrich II of Celje and Stjepan Banić near the town of Samobor, in what was then the Kingdom of Slavonia within the Kingdom of Hungary.

In a struggle for succession to the Crown of St. Stephen, Banić was allied to Vladislaus III of Varna, while Ulrich II supported Ladislas the Posthumous's eventual right to the throne.

Ulrich II's forces were commanded by the Celian–Czech mercenary Jan Vitovec. They were ultimately victorious, taking Banić prisoner after the battle. However, the infant Ladislas' mother, Elisabeth of Bohemia, died the following year, forcing Ulrich II to recognize Vladislaus III as king as well as release all prisoners. Vladislaus III died soon after in the Battle of Varna against the Ottoman Empire.

On March 1, 2006, the 565th anniversary of the battle, the city of Samobor hosted a large reenactment of the event.
