= Visborg =

Fortress in Visby, Gotland

Coordinates: 57.63543°N 18.28611°E

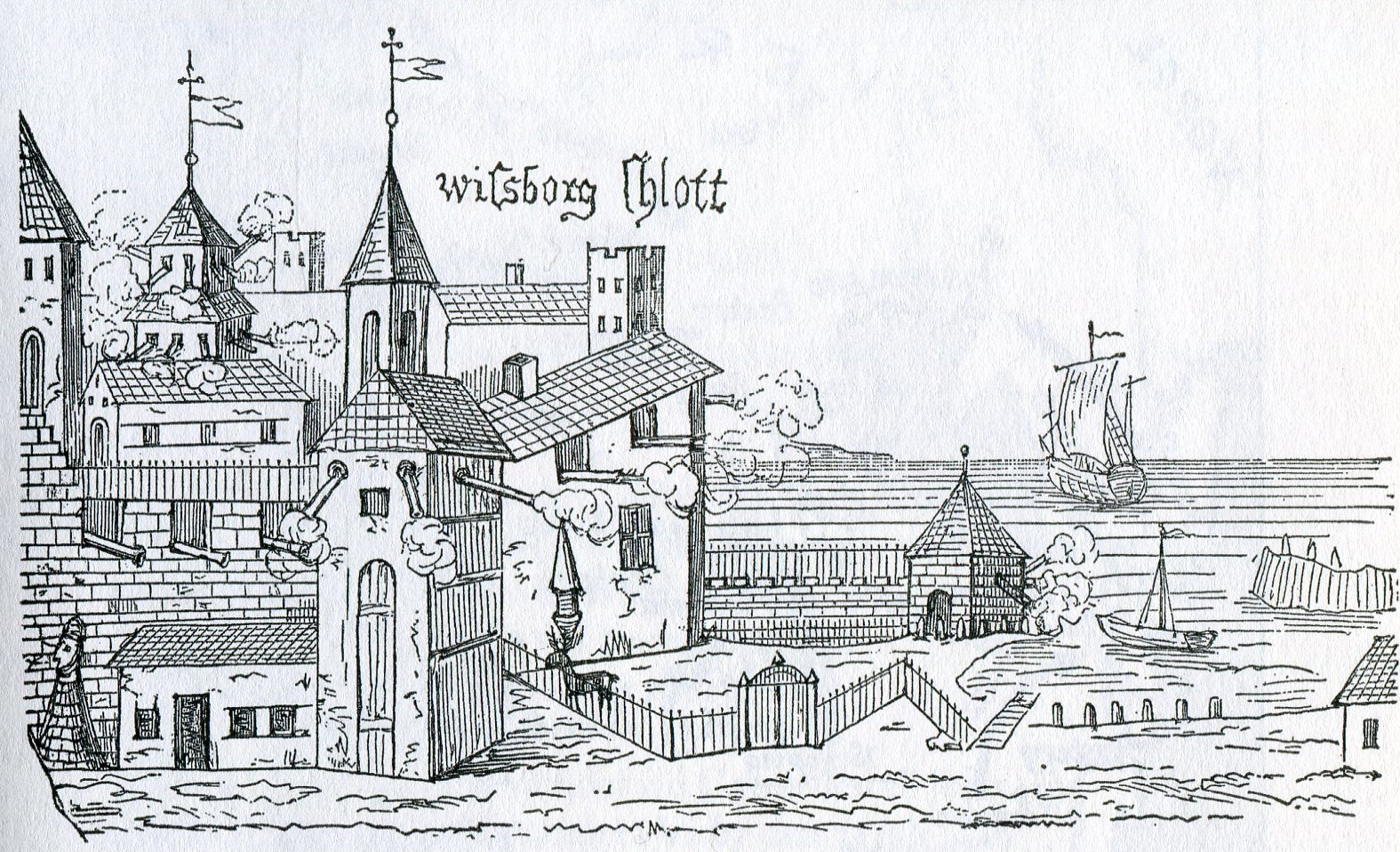
Castle Wisborg in an early 17th-century drawing

Visborg (also spelled Wisborg) was a medieval fortress located in the town of Visby on the Swedish island of Gotland. Several fortresses were built in Visby over the centuries. The last was the castle built by King Erik of Pomerania, ruler of Kalmar Union. The fortress served as Erik’s residence after his deposition and remained an important Danish stronghold until its destruction in 1679. Today, only fragments of its walls survive overlooking Visby’s harbor.

== History ==
The first known fortress in the southwest corner of Visby was built around 1310 by Duke Erik, son of King Magnus Ladulås of Sweden, during a conflict with his brothers over control of Sweden and Norway.

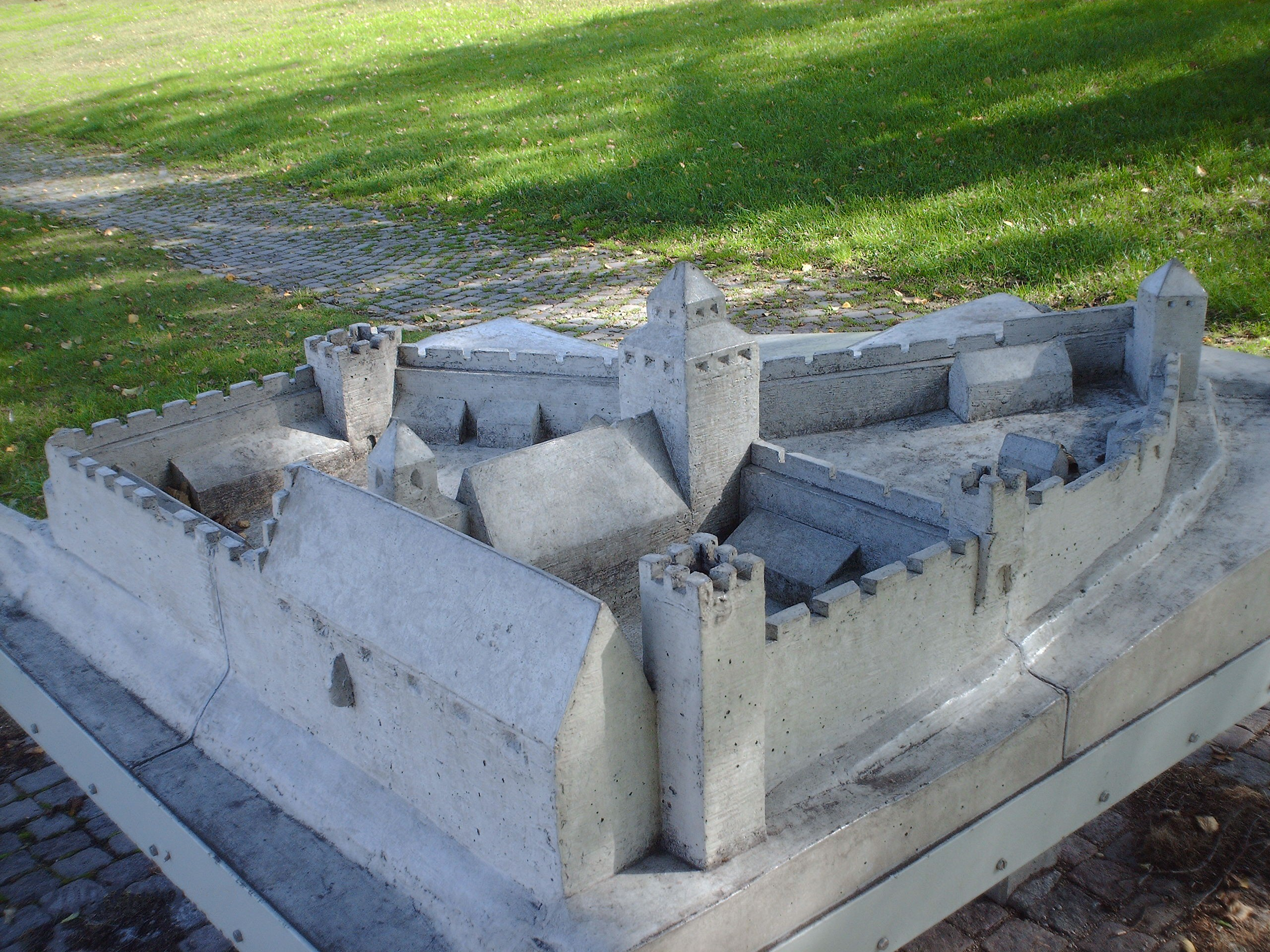
Model of the fortress, Visby.

In 1398, forces of the Teutonic Order under Grand Master Konrad von Jungingen captured Gotland and destroyed the earlier Visby fortifications, ending the rule of the pirate group known as the Victual Brothers, who had used the town as their base.

In 1408, the Teutonic Knights sold Gotland to King Erik of Pomerania, who began construction of a new fortress around 1411. The castle, known as Visborg, was strategically located on the southwestern edge of Visby, guarding the harbor and dominating the surrounding town.

After being deposed from the thrones of Denmark and Sweden in 1439, Erik withdrew to Visborg, which he ruled as an independent domain until 1449. That year, he reached an agreement with King Christian I of Denmark to cede Gotland in exchange for safe passage to Pomerania. The Danes subsequently reinforced the fortress, which remained under Danish control for nearly two centuries.

Under Danish administration, Visborg served as a key defensive and administrative center for Gotland. During the Scanian War (1675–1679), Danish troops reoccupied the island, but the Treaty of Lund in 1679 restored Gotland to Sweden. As the Danish forces withdrew, they destroyed Visborg Castle.

Today, only fragments of the fortress walls and foundations remain, overlooking the port of Visby.

== After the fortress ==
Prince Oscar of Sweden, Duke of Gotland and second in line to the Swedish throne, married without his father's permission, thereby relinquishing his right to succession and royal titles. On 2 February 1892 he was made the first Count of Wisborg by his mother's (Sophia of Nassau) brother Adolphe, Grand Duke of Luxembourg with reference to the old fortress of his former dukedom. Including Oscar there have been four such counts created, three of them Oscar's grandnephews in the 20th century, all former Swedish princes heirs who lost their Swedish titles for marrying without the King of Sweden's consent.
