= Pier Paolo Vergerio the Elder =

Italian humanist scholar

- Born: 23 July 1370; Capodistria, Republic of Venice (now Koper, Slovenia)
- Died: 8 July 1444 or 1445; Buda, Kingdom of Hungary (now Budapest, Hungary)
- Occupations: Statesman, pedagogue, and canon lawyer

Pier Paolo Vergerio (the Elder) (23 July 1370 – 8 July 1444 or 1445) was an Italian humanist, statesman, pedagogist and canon lawyer.

== Life ==
Vergerio was born in Capodistria, Istria, then in the Republic of Venice. He studied rhetoric at Padua, canon law at Florence (1387–89) and at Bologna (1389–90). He is noted for writing to Pope Innocent VII and Pope Gregory XII. Hans Baron writes in The Crisis of the Early Italian Renaissance, 1966 edition, p.134, "The catastrophe of 1405 ruined Vergerio's career as a humanist." (This refers to Padua losing its independence in 1405.)

Later he became canon of Ravenna and took part in the Council of Constance in 1414. The next year he was one of the fifteen delegates who accompanied the Emperor Sigismund to Perpignan, where an endeavor was made to induce Pope Benedict XIII to renounce his claims. From 1417 to his death he was secretary to Emperor Sigismund.

In July 1420, he was the chief orator of the Catholic party at the Hussite disputation in Prague. Though never married and probably in minor orders, he was not a priest. He died in Buda, Kingdom of Hungary, aged 73 or 74.

Pier Paolo Vergerio was the first to publish Petrarch's Africa for the public in 1396–1397.

== Works ==
The following of his works have been printed:

- "De ingenuis moribus ac liberalibus studiis" (Venice, 1472)
- "De Republica Veneta liber primus" (Toscolano, 1526)
- "Vita Petrarcae", edited by Tommassini in "Petrarca redivivus" (Padua, 1701)
- "Pro redintegranda uniendaque Ecclesia" edited with introduction and notes by Combi in "Archivio storico per Trieste, l'Istria ed il Trentino" (Rome, 1882), 351–374
- "Historia principum Carrariensium ad annum circiter MXXXLV" edited by Muratori, "Rerum ital. Script.", XVI, 113–184

His letters, 146 in number, were edited by Luciani (Venice, 1887). There are still in manuscript: a Latin version of Arrian's "Gesta Alexandri Magni"; a Life of Seneca; a panegyric on St. Jerome; a few comedies, satires, and other poems.

His On Good Manners (1402) is characterised by Quentin Skinner as the first treatise about the proper education of princes.
