= Mercado de Escravos =

Former slave market, now a museum, in Lagos, Portugal

Mercado de Escravos (Lagos Slave Market, Portugal)
- Mercado de Escravos
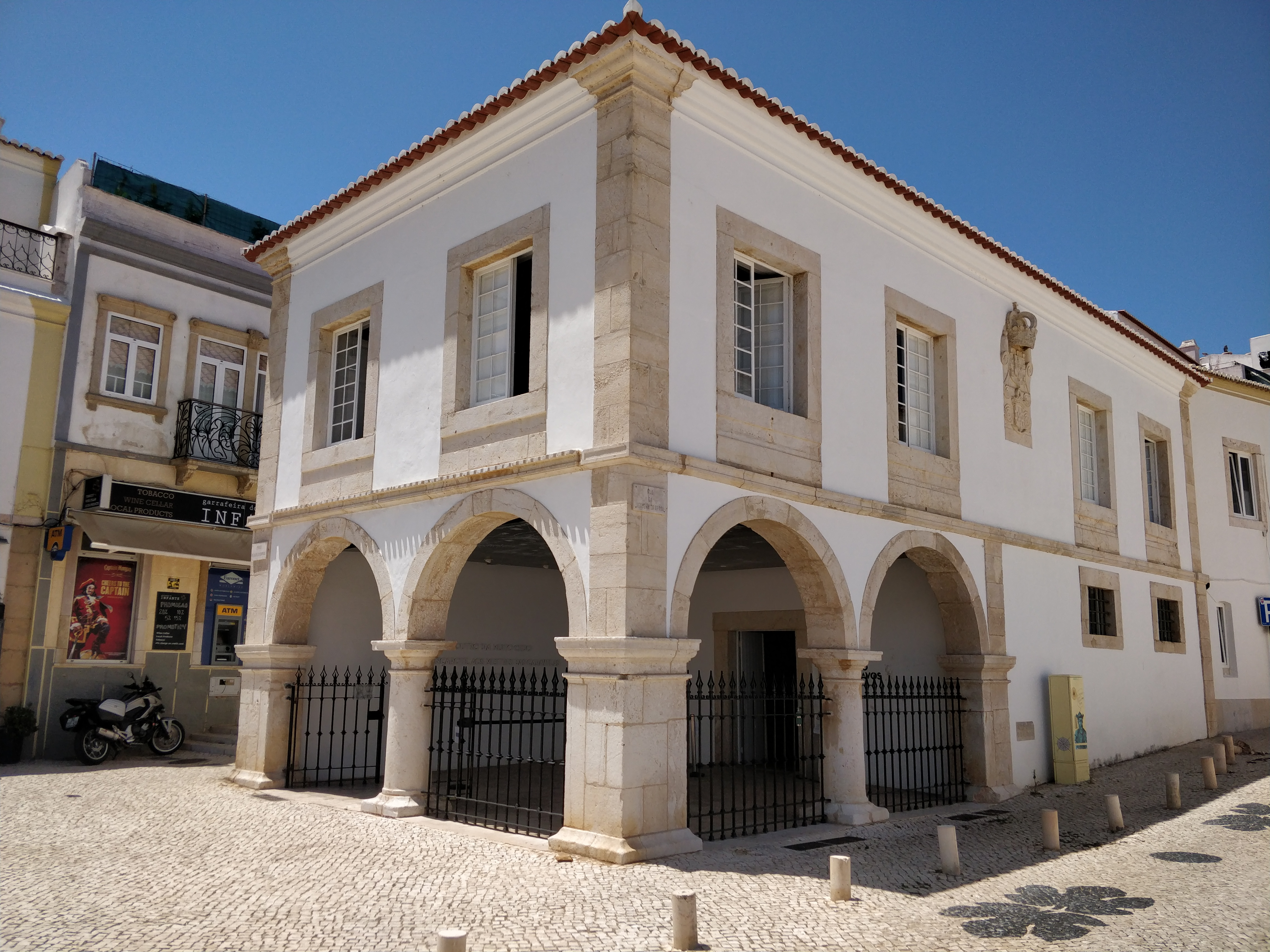
- Established: 1691 (opened as museum in 2016)
- Location: Lagos, Portugal
- Coordinates: 37°06′02″N 8°40′16.3″W
- Type: Former slave market converted to museum on slavery
- Owner: Lagos Municipality
- Public transit access: Yes
- Parking: Close

The Mercado de Escravos (lit. 'Slave Market') is a historical building in Lagos, in the Faro District of Portugal. It is located on the site where the first slave market in Europe of the modern era took place, in 1444. The building was first used for military administration and, later, as a customs house. In 2016, the whole building was occupied by a museum dedicated to the story of slavery.

== Historical background ==
In the mid-15th century, Lagos was developing into a major maritime centre, trading with the west coast of Africa. Prior to this time, African slaves had been mainly Berbers and Arabs from the North African coast, who were enslaved during ongoing conflict between indigenous Christians and Muslims. The first expeditions of discovery further south to Sub-Saharan Africa were sent out by Prince Infante D. Henrique, known today as Henry the Navigator. The first expedition that purchased slaves seems to have been one in 1441 commanded by Nuno Tristão, which went to the area known by the Portuguese as Rio do Ouro in Western Sahara, where one of the captains, Antão Gonçalves, discovered that Africa already had an internal African slave trade and bought slaves on his own initiative, returning to Portugal with 14 Africans.

In 1443, Henry the Navigator was granted an exclusive monopoly on all trade south of Cape Bojador by his brother Peter of Coimbra. A consortium of merchants in Lagos applied to Henry for a licence. Six caravels set out to the Bay of Arguin in modern-day Mauritania, commanded by Lançarote de Freitas and it was this mission that returned to Lagos in 1444 with 235 slaves, the first to be sold in Europe. As sponsor of the expeditions, Henry the Navigator was entitled to one fifth of the value of the slaves brought back. The 235 slaves were divided into five equal groups and Henry chose the group he wanted. Groups were formed without regard to family relationships, separating spouses and parents from children.

Slaves were initially rare. Only the richest could afford them and owning a slave was a symbol of social prestige. From the 16th century, however, slaves became commonplace and were employed both in a domestic context and on large-scale works such as land reclamation in the Algarve region of Portugal.

== The building ==
Constructed in 1691, the present Mercado de Escravos does not date back to the arrival of slaves in Lagos as, in 1512, King Manuel I issued a decree that from that time slaves could only be landed in Lisbon. On the instructions of Francisco Luís Baltazar da Gama (1636–1707), 6th Count of Vidigueira and 2nd Marquis of Nisa, the present building was constructed on the site of an old fourteenth-century building that had been used for the sale of slaves. The new building was used for military administration purposes and, from 1755 onwards, was the Customs House for Lagos. The building has two floors. In the Mannerist style, the ground floor has two distinct sections: one is open and limited by stone arches and by an iron fence, while the other is indoors. There is no access to the top floor from inside the building itself, the entrance being reached by walking up the hill to the west of the building.

In 2014, The Mercado de Escravos became a building of public interest (Monumento de Interesse Público, see classification).

== The museum ==
In 2009 Lagos City Council planned the installation of a museum in the Mercado de Escravos. There were initial difficulties with this as the Army, which had been occupying the ground floor, wished to use it as a recruitment centre. Following the intervention of the President of Portugal, Aníbal Cavaco Silva, at the request of the Mayor of Lagos, approval was given for the museum, and the building was ceded by the Portuguese Army to the Municipality of Lagos. It was temporarily closed in 2014 for necessary rehabilitation work and for development of the museum, which is part of the UNESCO Slave Route programme.

The museum was inaugurated on June 6, 2016. Making use of modern technology by giving visitors an electronic notebook or pad that permits a virtual visit, the museum explains the historical period when slaves were sold in the city. In December 2018 it was awarded the title of “International Centre for Living Memory of Human Dignity” by the Portugal-based Observatório Internacional de Direitos Humano (International Observatory of Human Rights).
