= Inch Island =

Island in County Donegal, Ireland

Native name: An Inis / Inis na nOsirí
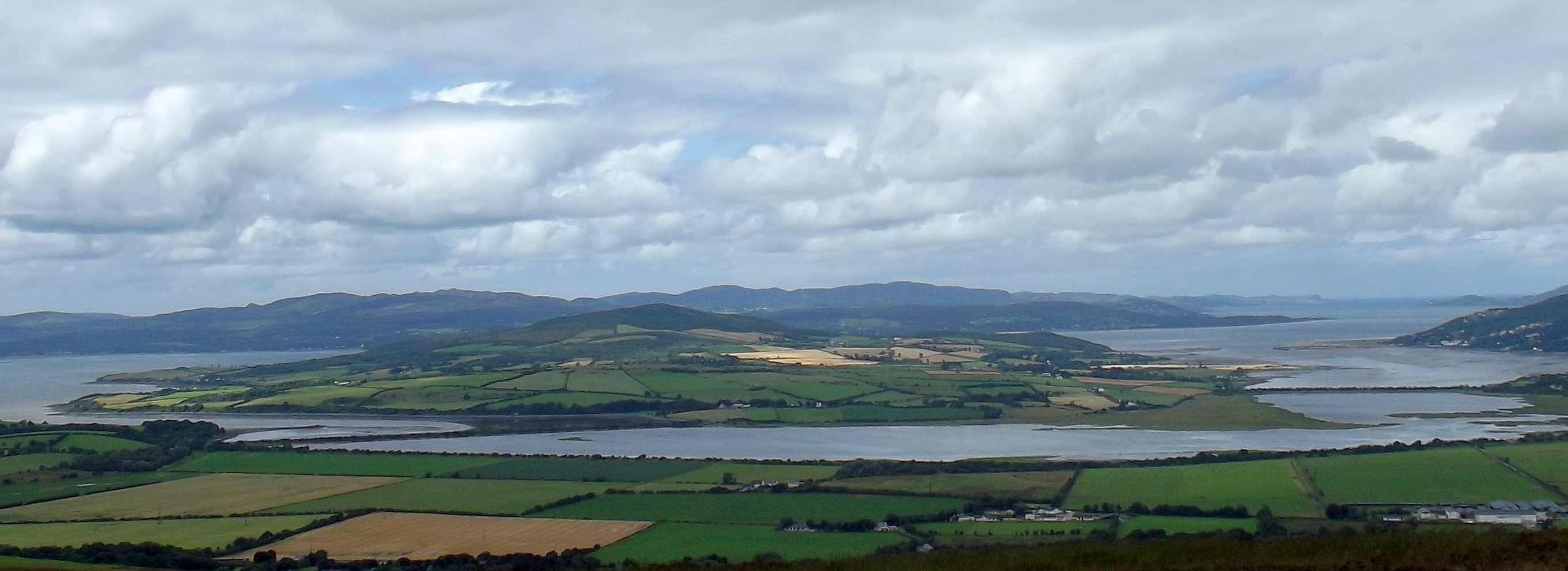
- Inch Island from Grianan of Aileach

- Location within island of Ireland

Geography
- Location: Lough Swilly
- Coordinates: 55.065°N 7.495°W
- Area: 13 km^{2} (5.0 sq mi)
- Highest elevation: 222 m (728 ft)

Administration
- Ireland
- Province: Ulster
- County: Donegal

Demographics
- Population: 396 (2022)

Inch Island (Irish: An Inis, meaning 'the island') is in Lough Swilly, a sea lough in County Donegal on the northern coast of Ireland. Inch is also the name of the civil parish covering the island.

== Geography and history ==
Inch Island is around 13 square kilometres (5 sq mi) in area. The island lies in Lough Swilly, Inch being just off the south-western coast of the Inishowen mainland, near the village of Burt. Inch Island is connected to the mainland by a causeway road, known as the Inch Banks. The island's highest hill, Inch Top, is 222 metres in height. Another Irish language name for Inch Island is Inis na nOsirí, meaning 'Island of the Oysters'.

== Population ==
Historical population

Year	Pop.	±%
1841	978	—
1851	769	−21.4%
1901	462	−39.9%
1951	414	−10.4%
1996	397	−4.1%

Year	Pop.	±%
2002	438	+10.3%
2006	438	+0.0%
2011	448	+2.3%
2016	461	+2.9%
2022	396	−14.1%

Source: John Chambers. "Islands - Change in Population 1841 - 2011". irishislands.info.

The table reports data taken from Discover the Islands of Ireland (Alex Ritsema, Collins Press, 1999) and the Census of Ireland.

== Buildings ==
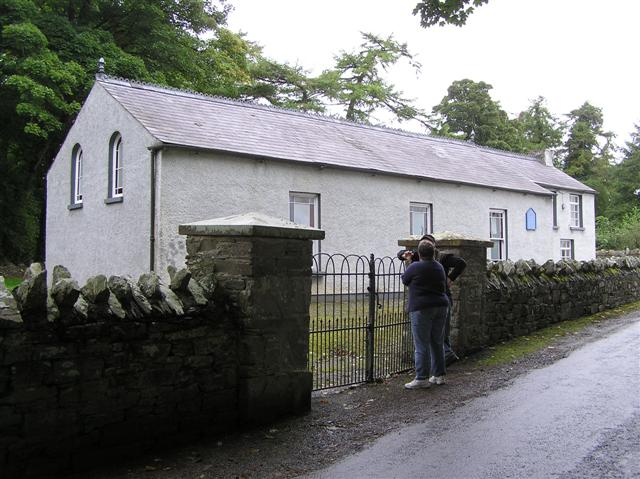
Presbyterian kirk (church), located at Carnaghan.

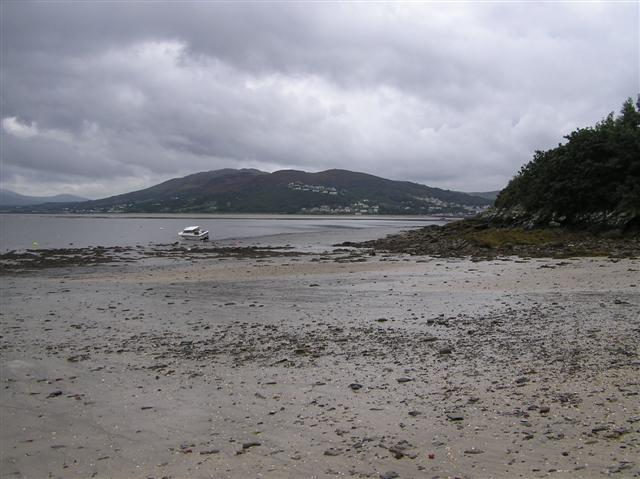
The beach looking ENE

The remains of a portal tomb with a nearby burial chamber, probably constructed using parts of the original tomb, is located near Carnaghan (Irish: Baile Mhic Cearnachain) on the south-western part of the island.

A 15th century castle, known as Inch Castle, stands on a cliff overlooking Lough Swilly. At the northern tip of the island is Inch Fort, an early 19C defensive structure.

The island's Presbyterian church is one of the smallest of the surrounding area (just some 14 families are members of it); the island's Catholic church, usually known simply as 'the Chapel', is dedicated to Our Lady of Lourdes and was built in 1932.

== Nature ==
Inch island is a well known birdwatching site with a relevant population of migratory and wintering birds. Bird species on the island include Greenland white fronted goose, whooper swan and greylag goose.

== Tourism ==
Inch Wildfowl Reserve features an 8 km looped walk, catering for outdoor recreational activity including walking, running and cycling. The site includes two car parks, seating, viewpoints and a number of bird hides open to the public. This scenic pathway follows around the lake edge and offers panoramic views of the surrounding agricultural landscape and wetlands.

== See also ==
- List of islands of Ireland
