= Inch Castle =

Ruined castle in County Donegal, Ireland

Coordinates: 55.0476°N 7.4962°W

- Interactive map of the Inch Castle area

General information
- Type: Castle
- Location: Ireland

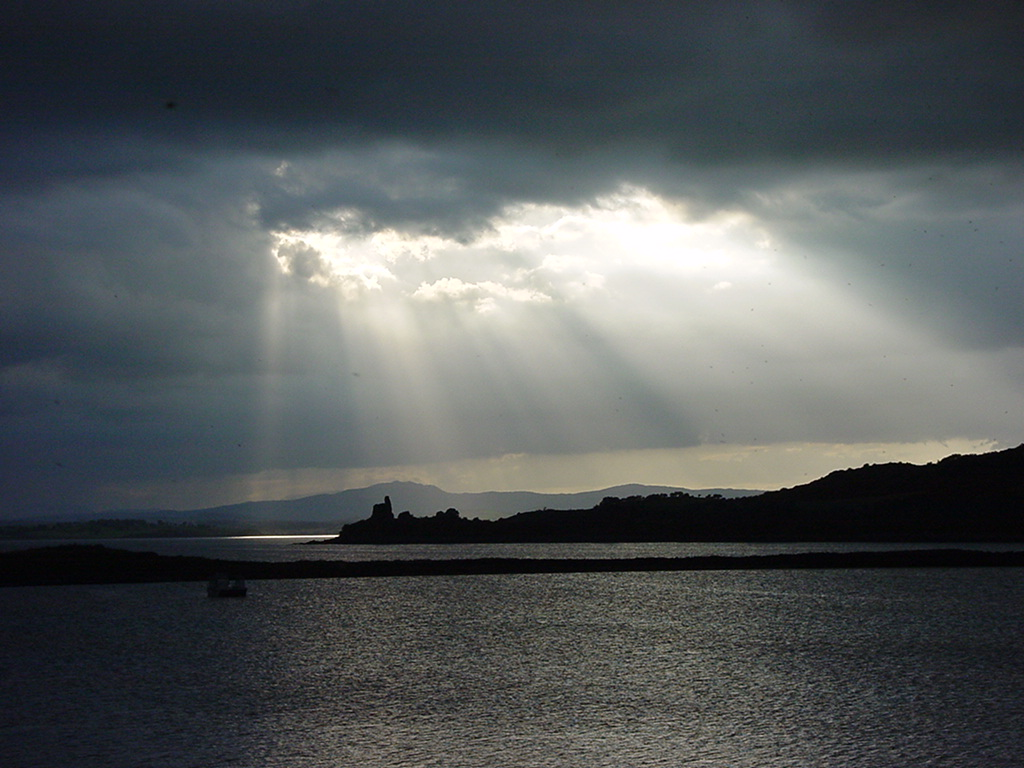
View towards Inch Castle

Inch Castle is a ruined castle located on the southern tip of Inch Island in County Donegal in Ulster, the northern province in Ireland. The castle was constructed around 1430 by the Gaelic Irish lord Neachtain O'Donnell for his father-in-law, Cahir O'Doherty. The Ó Dochartaigh (O'Doherty) clan were the dominant family on the nearby peninsula of Inishowen and had close links with the O'Donnells. It came to form part of the defensive network of O'Doherty fortifications designed to protect them from rival clans and to overawe those who accepted their overlordship.

Burt Castle is located just across Lough Swilly on the mainland, and this has sometimes led to the two being confused in historical accounts. It should also not be confused with Inch Fort, a much later development on the northern tip of the island which is now also in ruins.

== Bibliography ==
- Doherty, Richard. The Siege of Derry, 1689: The Military History. Spellmount, 2010.
- Walsh, David. Oileáin: a guide to the Irish islands. Pesda Press, 2004.
