= Bride of the Sea =

Bride of the Sea may refer to:

== Cities ==
- Rio Grande, Rio Grande do Sul, Brazil
- Jaffa, Tel Aviv, Israel
- Venice, Italy
- Tripoli, Libya
- Alexandria, Egypt

== Other ==
- Bride of the Sea (novel), a 2021 novel by Eman Quotah
- The Bride of the Sea, a 1913 film with Jeanne Eagels
- The Bride of the Sea, a 1965 film directed by Arman
- "The Bride of the Sea", a poem by H. P. Lovecraft
- Bride of the Sea (Невеста моря), a 1994 book by Rafael Grugman
- Bride of the Sea (De Bruid der Zee), a 1901 opera by Jan Blockx
- Bride of the Sea, a British ship shipwrecked in the Bosphorus in 1856
