= HMS Saldanha (1809) =

Frigate of the Royal Navy

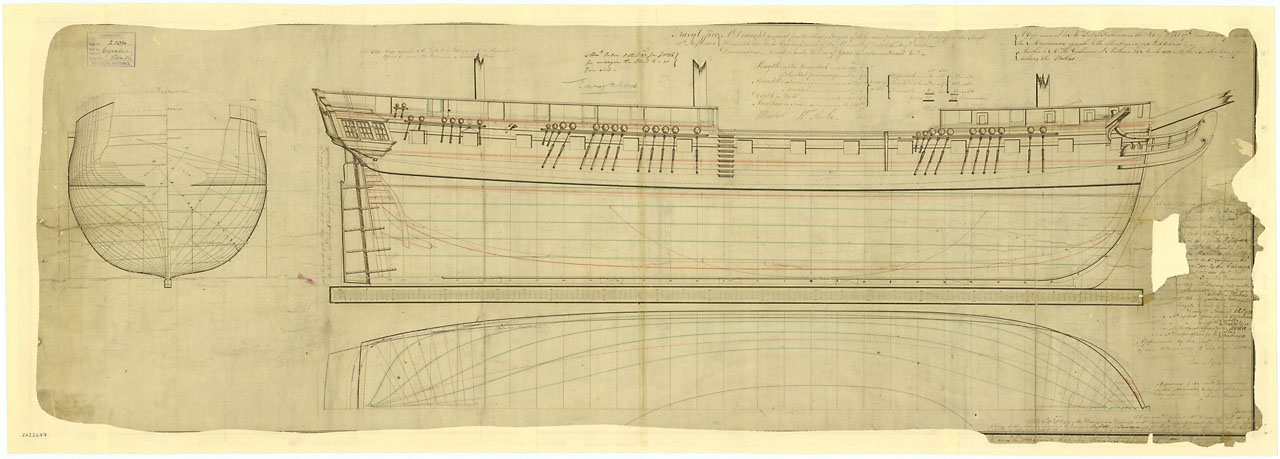
- 1803 plan of the Apollo class

History

United Kingdom
- Name: Saldanha
- Namesake: Capitulation of Saldanha Bay
- Ordered: 1 October 1806
- Builder: Temple shipbuilders, South Shields
- Laid down: March 1807
- Launched: 8 December 1809
- Completed: 6 July 1810
- Commissioned: April 1810
- Fate: Wrecked 4 December 1811

General characteristics
- Class & type: Apollo-class fifth-rate frigate
- Tons burthen: 951 29/94 (bm)
- Length: 144 ft 8 in (44.1 m) (overall); 121 ft 4 5/8 in (37.0 m) (keel)
- Beam: 38 ft 4 3/4 in (11.7 m)
- Depth of hold: 13 ft 2 1/2 in (4.0 m)
- Propulsion: Sails
- Complement: 264
- Armament: UD: 26 × 18-pounder guns; QD: 2 × 9-pounder guns + 10 × 32-pounder carronades; Fc: 2 × 9-pounder guns + 4 × 32-pounder carronades

HMS Saldanha was a 36-gun fifth-rate Apollo-class frigate of the Royal Navy. She was commissioned in April 1810 and spent her entire career serving on the Irish Station, including capturing a fast-sailing French privateer on 11 October 1811. In the evening of 4 December that year, Saldanha was serving off Lough Swilly when she was caught in a storm. Last seen sailing off Fanad Head, the ship was wrecked in a nearby bay, with every person on board being killed, and the only survivors being a parrot and a dog. Thomas Sheridan memorialised the wreck in his poem The Loss of the Saldanha.

== Design ==
Saldanha was a 36-gun, 18-pounder Apollo-class frigate. Designed by Surveyor of the Navy Sir William Rule, the Apollo class originally consisted of three ships constructed between 1798 and 1803. The class formed part of the Royal Navy's response to the French Revolutionary Wars and the need for more warships to serve in it. The original Apollo design was revived at the start of the Napoleonic Wars in 1803, with twenty-four ships ordered for it over the next nine years. This order came about as the French fleet's threat against Britain dissipated, especially after the Battle of Trafalgar in 1805. The Royal Navy stopped ordering specifically large and offensively capable warships, instead focusing on standardised classes of ships that were usually more moderate in size, but through larger numbers would be able to effectively combat the expected increase in global economic warfare.

The Apollo class became the standard frigate design for this task, alongside the Vengeur-class ship of the line and Cruizer-class brig-sloop. The Apollo class was chosen to fulfil the role of standardised frigate because of how well the lone surviving ship of the first batch, HMS Euryalus, had performed, providing "all-round excellence" according to naval historian Robert Gardiner. Trials of ships of the class showed that they could reach around 12 knots (22 km/h) and were very well balanced, although prone to pitching deeply in heavy seas. They also had a high storage capacity, allowing for upwards of six months' provisions. The biggest drawback of the class was that after about six weeks of service, when stores had been used up and the ships were riding higher in the water, the ships became far less weatherly.

== Construction ==
Half of the second batch of Apollo-class frigates were ordered to be built at commercial shipyards and half at Royal Navy Dockyards. In the former group of ships, Saldanha was ordered on 1 October 1806 to be built by shipwright Simon Temple at South Shields. She was the sixth frigate to be ordered to the renewed design.

Saldanha was laid down in March 1807 and launched on 8 December 1809 with the following dimensions: 144 feet 8 inches (44.1 m) along the upper deck, 121 feet 4 5/8 inches (37.0 m) at the keel, with a beam of 38 feet 4 3/4 inches (11.7 m) and a depth in the hold of 13 feet 2 1/2 inches (4.0 m). The ship measured 95129/94 tons burthen. She was named after the British victory at the capitulation of Saldanha Bay, the second vessel to take the name.

After her launch, Saldanha was fitted out at Chatham Dockyard, sailing from there on 6 July 1810. With a crew complement of 264, the frigate held twenty-six 18-pounder long guns on her upper deck. Complementing this armament were ten 32-pounder carronades and two 9-pounder long guns on the quarterdeck, with an additional two 9-pounder long guns and four 32-pounder carronades on the forecastle.

== Service ==
Saldanha was first commissioned in April 1810 under Captain John Stuart, serving on the Irish Station. On 3 February 1811, a boat from Saldanha was returning to the ship off Rathmullan with water casks when a wave overturned it. The midshipman commanding the boat and seven of its crew drowned, while the remaining four survived by clinging to the floating oars and casks. While in Lough Swilly on 19 March, Stuart died on board Saldanha. Later in the same month, Captain William Pakenham replaced him in command of the frigate. Pakenham's tenure was briefly interrupted in the Spring, with Captain Reuben Mangin temporarily assuming command in his absence. On 29 August, Saldanha detained the American ship Favourite as she sailed from Dublin to New York, sending her into Cork, because the vessel carried too many passengers.

Saldanha was sent to sea alongside the 36-gun frigate HMS Fortunee on 25 September in an attempt to intercept a group of French frigates that were thought to be returning to Europe after being present at the British Invasion of Isle de France. The two ships did not come across the frigates, but on 11 October, they captured the French 18-gun privateer Vice-Amiral Martin off Cape St. Vincent. The privateer had a crew of 140 men and had been four days out of Bayonne when she was captured. Captain Henry Vansittart of Fortunee remarked that Vice-Amiral Martin had superior sailing abilities that in the past had helped her escape British cruisers, and though each of the British vessels had been doing 11 knots (20 km/h; 13 mph) at the time of the capture, the French ship would have still escaped if Saldanha and Fortunee had not outnumbered her.

== Loss ==
Still serving on the Irish Station, on 19 November, Saldanha sailed from Cork to Lough Swilly, where she was to replace the 40-gun frigate HMS Endymion on patrol. Having reached harbour in Lough Swilly on 30 November, Saldanha sailed with Endymion and the 18-gun sloop-of-war HMS Talbot to patrol towards the west. From 3 December into the evening of 4 December, a storm came in from the north-west, including driving snow. Saldanha was last seen, by her lights, from Talbot at 9:30 p.m. passing Fanad Head; a light was then seen from ashore moving quickly past the Lough Swilly harbour at about 10 p.m.; Saldanha was not sighted again until her wreck was discovered 50 yards (46 m) off the shore in Ballymastocker Bay, within Lough Swilly, the following morning.

There were no human survivors from Saldanha; about 200 bodies, including that of Pakenham, washed up and were buried in a local cemetery. One man was alive when he came ashore, but was very weak, and with no doctor immediately available to help him, when he asked for a drink, the locals gave him half a pint of whisky, which almost immediately killed him. The ship's dog survived. It was thought that the frigate had been attempting to return to her anchorage in the gale, but had struck the submerged Swilly Rock off the harbour entrance, and then been pushed into Ballymastocker Bay by the storm.

Initial reports suggested that Talbot too had been wrecked, but these were mistaken; Saldanha had been broken in two as she wrecked, and these halves were initially seen as separate vessels. Twenty-one members of Saldanha's crew escaped the disaster, having been left behind on board the hospital ship HMS Trent when the frigate sailed from Cork. (Note: Two Royal Marine lieutenants, one midshipman, four able seamen, six ordinary seamen, one member of the carpenter's crew, one landsman, one Royal Marine corporal, and five Royal Marine privates.)

On 28 August 1812, a servant working at a house in Burt, County Donegal, shot a green parrot, believing it to be a hawk. Upon inspection, the parrot was found to have a gold ring around its neck, with the engraving "Captain Pakenham, of His Majesty's ship Saldanha". Bystanders reported that at the time it was shot, the parrot had been attempting to speak either French or Spanish; it was listed as the only other survivor of Saldanha, alongside the dog.

== Legacy ==
Saldanha Head, near Knockalla Fort, where Saldanha's wreck was discovered, is named after the frigate. The columns inside the Presbyterian meeting house at Ramelton were constructed using material recovered from the frigate. In the 1980s, an anchor was discovered at the wreck site and placed on the shore near that spot. Soon after the wreck, Thomas Sheridan wrote the poem The Loss of the Saldanha, one verse of which states:

O'er Swilly's rocks they soar,
Commission'd watch to keep;
Down, down with thundering roar
The exulting demons pour –
The Saldanha floats no more
On the deep!

A special ceremony was held on 4 December 2011 to mark the 200th anniversary of the sinking in Lough Swilly of Saldanha. It was the first commemorative event recalling one of Ireland's worst-ever marine disasters. Until then, there had been no memorial to their deaths. In February 2026, high winds displaced sand at Ballymastocker Beach and uncovered the timber starboard bow of a ship matching Saldanha. The remains are 14 metres (46 ft) long and 8 feet (2.4 m) deep. The wreck was subsequently re-covered by the sands, with the National Monuments Service planning further work to conclusively identify the wreck.
