= Katharine A. O'Keeffe =

Irish-born American educator, lecturer and writer

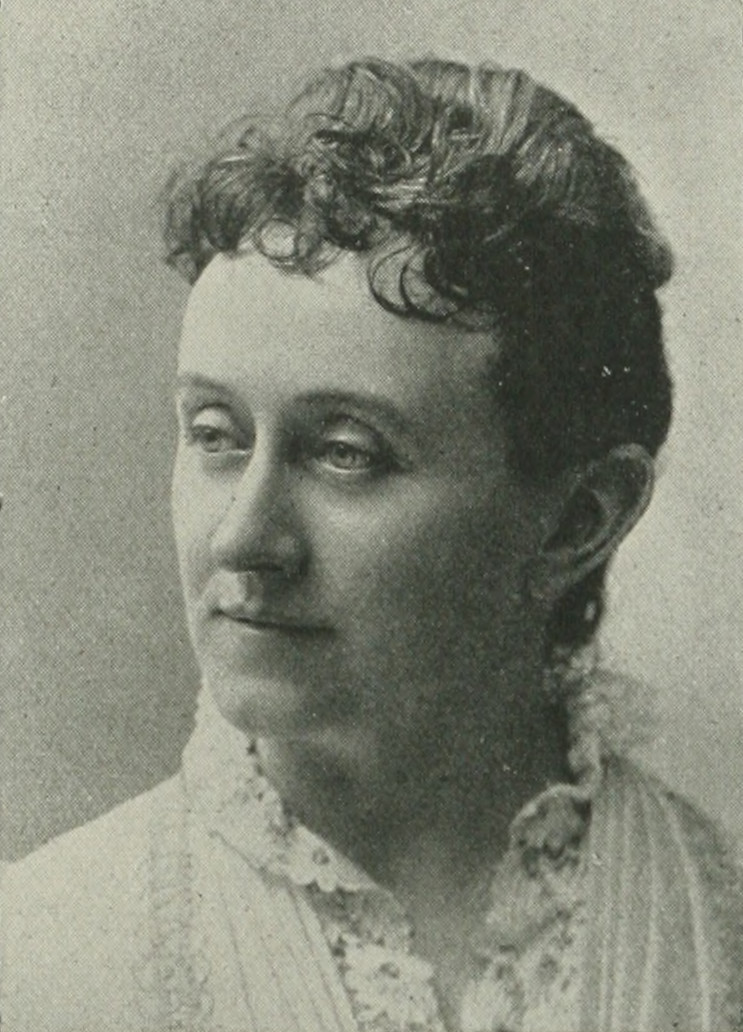
- Photo in A Woman of the Century
- Born: Katharine Aloysia O'Keeffe; 1852/1855; Kilkenny, Ireland
- Died: 2 January 1918; Lawrence, Massachusetts, U.S.
- Resting place: Immaculate Conception Cemetery, Lawrence
- Citizenship: USA
- Education: Sisters of Notre Dame, St. Mary's School, Lawrence High School
- Occupations: Educator, lecturer, writer
- Spouse: Daniel J. O'Mahoney (m. 1896)
- Writing career
- Notable work: Famous Irishwomen

Katharine O'Mahoney (née Katharine Aloysia O'Keeffe; 1852/1855 – January 2, 1918) was an Irish-born American educator, lecturer, and writer who taught poetry to Robert Frost. She was one of the first Catholic women in New England, if not in the United States, to speak in public from the platform. Among her lectures may be mentioned "A Trip to Ireland" (illustrated); "Religion and Patriotism in English and Irish History" (illustrated); "Mary, Queen of Scots", and "Joan of Arc" (both illustrated); "An Evening with Milton, including recitations from Paradise Lost", illustrated with fifty views from Dore; "An Evening with Dante, including recitations from the Divine Comedy", illustrated by seventy-six views from Dore; and "The Passion Play of Oberammergau". O'Mahoney was the author of several books. She also founded, and until marriage, edited and published The Sunday Register, a Catholic weekly.

== Early life and education ==
Katharine Aloysia O'Keeffe (Note: Her first name was sometimes spelled as Katherine.) was born in Kilkenny, Ireland, in either 1855 or 1852. Her parents were Patrick and Rose (Gore) O'Keeffe.

The O'Keeffes were an old Milesian family, whose head was Prince of Fermoy, before dispossessed by the Sassenach. About two centuries ago, one branch of the family went to Kilkenny, and, until the departure above mentioned, lived on a small farm at a place called Inch Castle, about 2 miles (3.2 km) from the City of Kilkenny, a portion of the estate of Lord Ormond. The Gore family, on the maternal side, was Anglo-Norman: but not of the branch that gave a vote for the Union. O'Mahoney's family came to the United States in her infancy and settled in Methuen, Massachusetts, removing later to Lawrence, Massachusetts.

O'Mahoney attended for several years the school of the Sisters of Notre Dame, St. Mary's School, and later she took the course in the Lawrence High School, graduating with the highest honors of her class in 1873. She was also taught by private tutors.

== Career ==
O'Mahoney taught in the Lawrence High School from 1873 to 1892, filling the position of teacher of history, rhetoric and elocution, including teaching poetry to Robert Frost. At an early age she manifested unusual cleverness in recitations, and, from the beginning of her career as a teacher, a forcible and lucid way of setting forth her subject.

From 1885, she was a lecturer on literary and historical subjects. She was, probably, the first Irish-American woman, at least in New England, to venture in the role of lecturer. She began to come into prominence in the Irish National Land League days, and made her first public appearance in Boston at the time of a visit to that city of Fanny Parnell. Since then, she developed as a lecturer, gaining steadily in strength and versatility, as well as in popularity. Among her lectures were "A Trip to Ireland", "Landmarks of English History", "Mary, Queen of Scots", "An Evening With Longfellow", "An Evening With Moore", "Catholic and Irish Pages of American History", "An Evening With Milton", "An Evening With Dante", "History of the United States", "The Passion Play", and "Scenes and Events in the Life and Writings of John Boyle O'Reilly". Some of those lectures were given before large audiences in the cities and towns of New England. In 1892, she delivered the Memorial Day oration before the Grand Army of the Republic in Newburyport, Massachusetts. She was one of the evening lecturers in the Catholic Summer School, New London, Connecticut, in the summer of 1892.

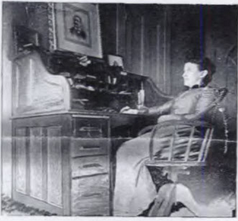
Katharine O'Keeffe (1893)

In 1892, she founded, published, and edited the Catholic Register. She contributed to the Boston Pilot, the Sacred Heart Review, Donahoe's Magazine, and Magazine of Our Lady of Good Counsel. She found time to work as an original writer and compiler, and published a "Longfellow Night" and a series of school readings. She also furnished local correspondence to the Sacred Heart Review, of Boston and Cambridge, and was an associate member of the New England Woman's Press Association. She was the author of Catholicity in Lawrence (Augustinian Fathers, Lawrence, 1882); Faith of Our Fathers (poem, Register Publishing Co., Lawrence, 1892); Moore's Birthday, a musical allegory (Register Publishing Co., 1893); Famous Irishwomen (1907), and Collection of Hibernian Odes, 1908 (both published by Lawrence Publishing Co., Lawrence, Mass.).

== Personal life ==
O'Mahoney was prominent in the women's branch of the Irish Land League; founder and president of the Aventine Literary Club, and of the Orphans' Friends' Society, of Lawrence County; organizer of a division of the Ladies' Auxiliary, Ancient Order of Hibernians, its president for five years, and Essex County president for two years. She was secretary of the Essex branch, Boston Archdiocesan Union of the American Federation of Catholic Societies; organizer and first president of St. Mary's Alumni Association; and vice-president of Lawrence Anti-Tuberculosis League.

In 1884, with her father, she visited England and Ireland, and was entertained by Michael Davitt, and his sister, at their home in Ballybrack, a suburb of Dublin. On July 9, 1896 (or 1895), she married Daniel J. O'Mahoney (1857–1922), Lawrence city's superintendent of streets. She died on January 2, 1918, in Lawrence, Massachusetts.

== Selected works ==
- Sketch of Catholicity in Lawrence and Vicinity, 1882
- An Evening with Longfellow
- Faith of Our Fathers, 1892
- Moore's Birthday: A Musical Allegory, 1893
- Famous Irishwomen, 1907
- Collection of Hibernian Odes, 1908
