= Fort Dunree =

Fort in Ireland

- Inishowen peninsula Ireland
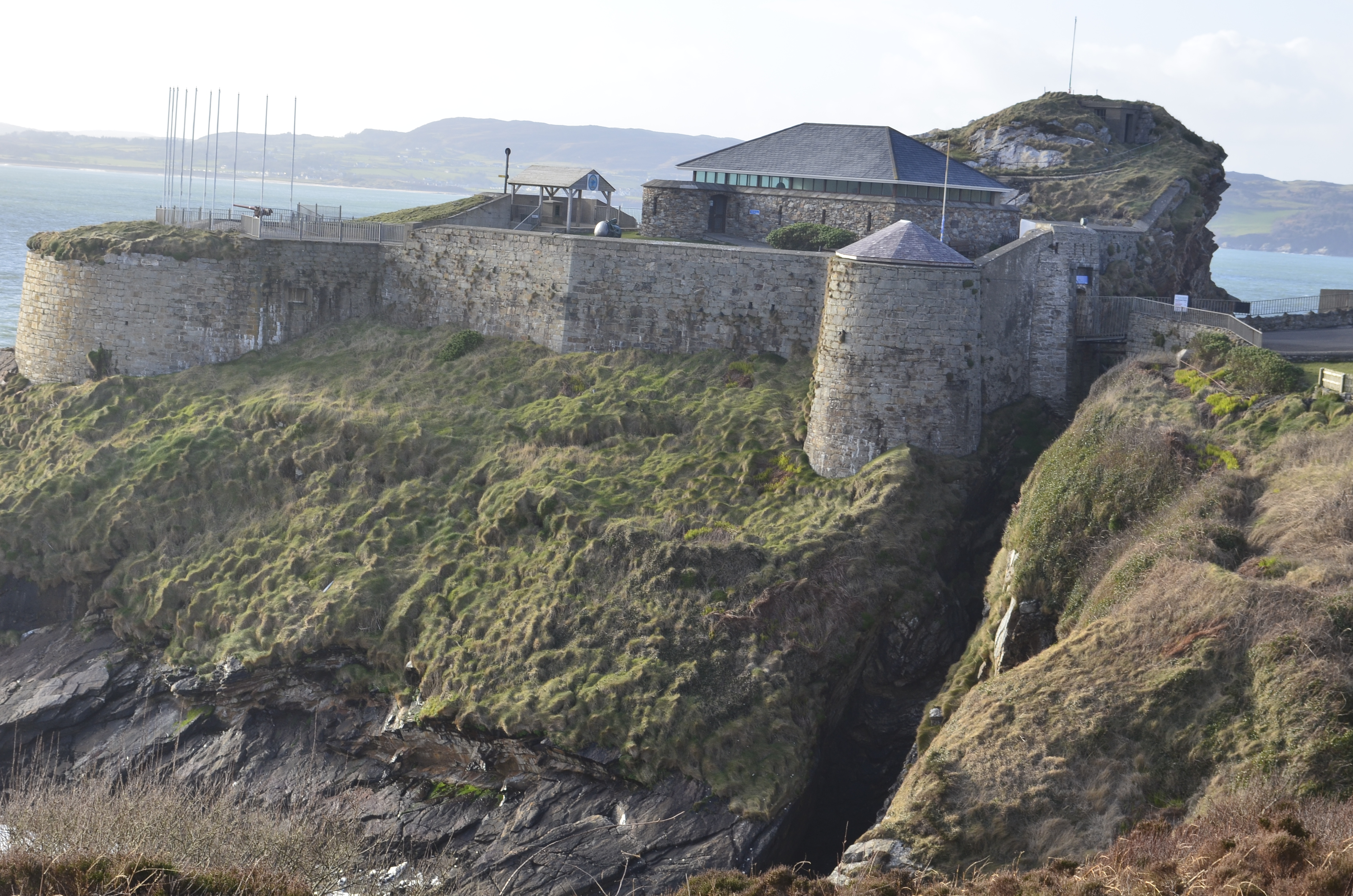
- Dunree Fort, 2015

Site information
- Open to the public: Yes
- Condition: Complete

Location
- Coordinates: 55.196739°N 7.553042°W

Site history
- Built: 1812-13 (c)
- In use: Museum
- Materials: Stone

Fort Dunree (Irish: An Dún Riabhach, meaning 'Grey Fort' or Dún Fhraoigh meaning "Fort of Heather") is a coastal defence fortification located on the west side of the Inishowen peninsula, County Donegal, Ireland.

== History ==
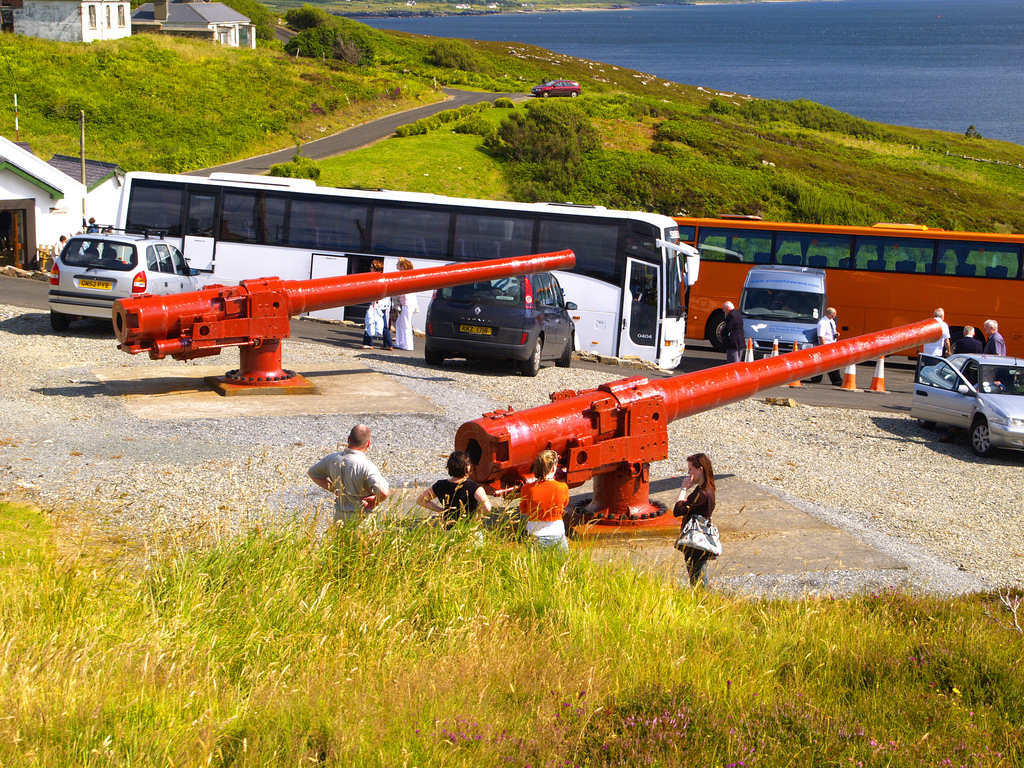
Coast defence guns from World War I at Dunree Fort

The fort is located on a rocky promontory accessed over a natural fissure. Originally built as part of a series of fortifications defending Lough Swilly during the Napoleonic Wars, located opposite Knockalla Fort on the other side of the lough.

The fort was neglected after the peace of 1815. In 1874 it was armed with seven 24 Pounder guns.

It was remodelled in 1895 to have 2 x 4.7 inch (120 mm) QF guns below, and later 12-pounder (5 kg) QF and 2 x 6 inch (152 mm) guns in an upper land battery. The top of a hill overlooking the site was walled in to form a redoubt. Both 6-inch guns were operational during the First World War.

== Treaty port ==
On 6 December 1921, the Anglo Irish Treaty was concluded. It provided for the establishment of the Irish Free State which happened on 6 December 1922. The Treaty included provisions by which the British would retain sovereignty over three strategically important ports known as the Treaty ports, one of which being described in the Treaty as:

Lough Swilly (d) Harbour defences to remain in charge of British care and maintenance parties.

Accordingly, even after the establishment of the Irish Free State, the Royal Navy continued to maintain its presence at Fort Dunree. Fort Dunree remained under British sovereignty until 3 October 1938 when, pursuant to the Anglo-Irish Trade Agreement of 25 April 1938, the territory was ceded to Ireland. On 4 October 1938, The Times reported on the handover of Lough Swilly at Fort Dunree on 3 October 1938 as follows:

FORTS HANDED OVER TO EIRE - Britain's last forts in Eire, those on the gale-swept Lough Swilly at Dunree and Leenan, were surrendered to the Eire Defence Forces yesterday. The ceremony at Dunree was witnessed by only a dozen spectators. The Union Jack, was hauled down by two Royal Artillery N.C.O.s and the Eire green, white, and orange flag was run up by two N.C.O.s of the Coastal Artillery Defence Force. The ceremony was brought forward from October 26, the date originally fixed under the Anglo-Irish Pact, on account of the international situation. When the British troops left last evening en route for Shoeburyness, their new headquarters, they were given a cordial send off. By a coincidence Sergeant O'Flynn, of the Royal Artillery, who hauled down the Union Jack, and Sergeant McLaughlin, of the Eire force, who hoisted the tricolour, are brothers-in-law.

Two brothers in-law, one hauling down a Union Jack and the other hauling up an Irish tricolour was indeed a poignant end to the long history of British military presence in the territory of the Irish state. It was also the last time sovereignty over any territory was ceded to Ireland.

The guns at the Fort were manned by the Irish Army until decommissioned following the Second World War. Fort Dunree was used by the Irish Army for training until 1990.

== Preservation ==
The fort is now a military museum with detailed exhibitions, many restored guns such as BL 6 inch Mk VII naval gun and an old military camp. There are also displays about the area birds, marine life and coastal vegetation.

Other facilities include a gift shop, auditorium, café and trail walks.

== Publications ==
Paul M. Kerrigan (1995). Castles and fortifications in Ireland, 1485–1945. Collins Press. ISBN 1898256128.
