= Macamish Fort =

Martello tower in County Donegal, Ireland

- County Donegal; Ireland
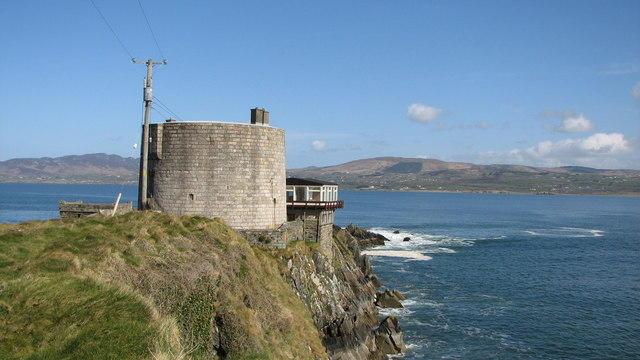
- Macamish Fort in 2008

Site information
- Owner: Privately owned
- Open to the public: No access
- Condition: Intact

Location
- Coordinates: 55.13774°N 7.5250°W

Site history
- Built: 1812-1813
- Materials: Stone; Concrete; Earth

Garrison information
- Garrison: British Armed Forces

Macamish Fort is one of several Napoleonic batteries built along the shores of Lough Swilly in county Donegal, to defend the north west of Ireland. It was part of a scheme to fortify Lough Swilly and Lough Foyle against French Invasion during the Revolutionary and Napoleonic Wars and was completed between 1812 and 1813. It was built on a rock outcrop overlooking the lough. It comprises a Martello Tower mounting a single gun and battery mounting three guns. The fort was originally entered by a drawbridge.

After the end of the Napoleonic Wars the defences were neglected and not updated. By the 1860s the Fort was obsolete and disarmed.

The fort remains substantially intact, and is now in use as a private residence.

== Publications ==
- Paul M. Kerrigan (1995). Castles and fortifications in Ireland, 1485–1945. Collins Press. ISBN 1898256128.
- Col K W Maurice-Jones, 1959. The History of Coast Artillery in the British Army, Royal Artillery Institution, London
