= Lenan Head Fort =

Fort protecting Lough Swilly, Donegal, Ireland

- County Donegal; Ireland
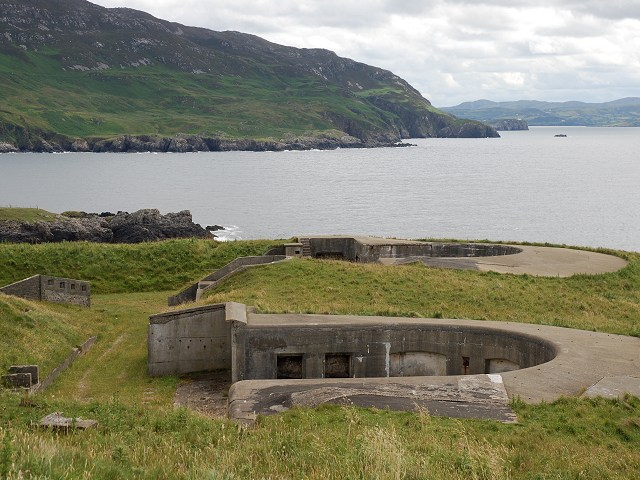
- Positions for 9.2-inch Breech Loading guns at Lenan Head Fort

Site information
- Open to the public: Accessible
- Condition: Intact

Location
- Coordinates: 55.247°N 7.532°W

Site history
- Built: 1895-1900
- Materials: Concrete; Earth

Lenan Head Fort, Lough Swilly, Inishowen, County Donegal was built in 1895, initially with three 9.2 inch Breech Loading (BL) guns. Following recommendations of the Owen Committee in 1905, it was refitted in 1911 with two newer Mark X 9.2 inch models. Both guns were operational during the First World War.

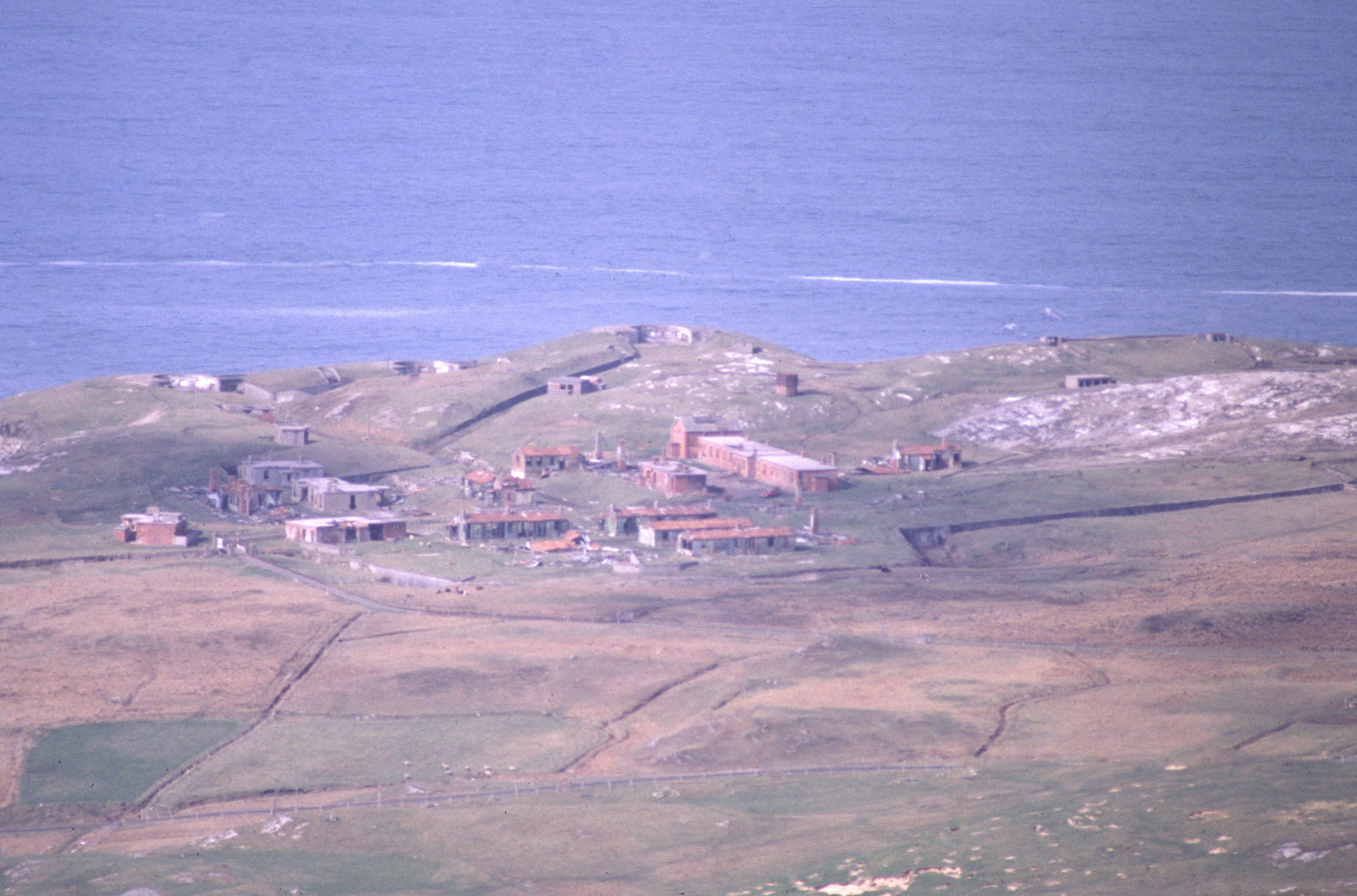
Lenan Fort from Mamore Hills 1991

== Treaty port ==
On 6 December 1921, the Anglo Irish Treaty was concluded. It provided for the establishment of the Irish Free State which happened on 6 December 1922. The Treaty included provisions by which the British would retain sovereignty over three strategically important ports known as the Treaty ports. This included a number of coastal artillery defences, including the Defences of Lough Swilly, which were retained by the British Government on a Care and maintenance basis.

All of the defences were fully transferred to the Republic of Ireland in 1938, with the last Royal Artillery personnel leaving on 10 October that year. The battery was manned by the Irish Army in the Second World War. The Irish coast artillery service was disbanded in 1952. The battery was disarmed and the guns scrapped in the 1950s.

An unusual British fortified site, because it was started so late, it includes concrete caponiers in an extensive ditch system that climbs the hill to the headland.

== Publications ==
- Col K W Maurice-Jones, 1959. The History of Coast Artillery in the British Army, Royal Artillery Institution, London
