= List of shipwrecks in February 1856 =

The list of shipwrecks in February 1856 includes ships sunk, foundered, wrecked, grounded, or otherwise lost during February 1856.

== 1 February ==
List of shipwrecks: 1 February 1856
Ship	State	Description
Christina Margaretha	Netherlands	The schooner was driven ashore east of Gibraltar. She was on a voyage from Trieste to Hamburg.
Hellespont	United Kingdom	The brig was wrecked at Algeciras, Spain.

== 2 February ==
List of shipwrecks: 2 February 1856
Ship	State	Description
Ann Jones	United Kingdom	The ship collided with Perseverance (United Kingdom) and sank off the Bishop Rock, Isles of Scilly with the loss of one of her three crew. Survivors were rescued by Perseverance. Ann Jones was on a voyage from Cardiff, Glamorgan to Liverpool, Lancashire.
Lion	United Kingdom	The brig was destroyed by fire off Cape St. Vincent, Portugal. Her crew were rescued by the galiot Jezina (Netherlands). Lion was on a voyage from Catania, Sicily to an English port.
Rival	France	The brig was driven ashore and wrecked east of Gibraltar. She was on a voyage from Marseille, Bouches-du-Rhône to the Gambia River.

== 3 February ==
List of shipwrecks: 3 February 1856
Ship	State	Description
Commerce	United Kingdom	The ship ran aground on the Breast Rock, off Girvan, Ayrshire and was damaged. She was on a voyage from Liverpool, Lancashire to Ayr. She was refloated the next day.
Josephine Willis	United Kingdom	Mangerton strikes Josephine Willis. The sailing ship was wrecked 6 nautical miles (11 km) off Folkestone, Kent when the steamship Mangerton (United Kingdom) ran into her. There was doubt about rule 296 of the Merchant Shipping Act, that ships should steer to port to avoid collision, but Mangerton was not found blameworthy. Fifty-seven passengers and twelve crew died. There were at least 48 survivors, 22 of whom were rescued by Mangerton. Josephine Willis was on a voyage from London to New Zealand.
Thora Advilda	Netherlands	The ship was wrecked near Gallipoli, Ottoman Empire. She was on a voyage from Cardiff, Glamorgan, United Kingdom to Constantinople, Ottoman Empire.

== 4 February ==
List of shipwrecks: 4 February 1856
Ship	State	Description
Corunna	United Kingdom	The ship ran aground on the Goodwin Sands, Kent. She was on a voyage from Newcastle upon Tyne, Northumberland to Constantinople, Ottoman Empire. She was refloated and put in to Ramsgate, Kent.
Friend's Increase	United Kingdom	The ship was in collision with Queen Dowager and foundered off the coast of Yorkshire. Her crew were rescued by Queen Dowager.
Hyperion	United Kingdom	The ship ran aground at Laguna and was severely damaged. She was on a voyage from Laguna to Liverpool, Lancashire. She was refloated on 8 February and taken in to Laguna but was condemned.
Simoda	France	The transport ship was wrecked in the Dardanelles or the Sea of Marmora. Her crew were rescued. She was on a voyage from Oran, Algeria to Constantinople.

== 5 February ==
List of shipwrecks: 5 February 1856
Ship	State	Description
George and Margaret	United Kingdom	The ship ran aground at Conheath, Dumfriesshire. She was refloated on 11 February.
Leopold	United Kingdom	The tug was run into by a steam barge and sank in the River Avon.
Margaret	United Kingdom	The schooner departed from Berwick upon Tweed for Newcastle upon Tyne, Northumberland. No further trace, presumed foundered in the North Sea with the loss of all hands.
Mary Ellen	United Kingdom	The ship departed from Milford Haven, Pembrokeshire for Belfast, County Antrim. No further trace, presumed foundered in the Irish Sea with the loss of all hands.
Princess Maria	United Kingdom	The ship departed from Ballina, County Mayo for Liverpool, Lancashire. She subsequently capsized with the loss of all hands. She was towed in to Tobermory, Isle of Mull on 19 April in a capsized condition.
Villager	United Kingdom	The schooner was driven ashore and sank at Sambro, Nova Scotia, British North America. All on board were rescued. She was on a voyage from Halifax, Nova Scotia to Liverpool.

== 6 February ==
List of shipwrecks: 6 February 1856
Ship	State	Description
Amity	United Kingdom	The sloop was driven ashore and severely damaged near Millport, Cumbrae, Ayrshire. Her crew were rescued. She was on a voyage from Lisbon, Portugal to Glasgow, Renfrewshire.
Anna	United Kingdom	The sloop was driven ashore and wrecked at Elie, Fife with the loss of all hands. She was on a voyage from Elie to Newcastle upon Tyne, Northumberland.
Augusta Jessie	United Kingdom	The ship was driven ashore and sank at Ned's Point, County Donegal with the loss of a crew member. She was on a voyage from Callao, Peru to Queenstown, County Cork. She was refloated on 21 June and beached at Fahan Point.
Brandon	United Kingdom	The lighter was blown out to sea from Tarbert, Argyllshire. She was driven ashore and wrecked on Skate Island, Renfrewshire. All three people on board were rescued.
British Queen	United Kingdom	The schooner was driven from her mooring at Ardrossan, Ayrshire. She subsequently collided with the schooner Glasgow and the brigs Industry and Commerce (all United Kingdom).
Charles	United Kingdom	The ship was driven ashore at Lamlash, Isle of Arran.
Clan Gregor	United Kingdom	The ship was driven ashore and damaged at Crosby Point, Lancashire. She was on a voyage from Calcutta, India to Liverpool, Lancashire. She was refloated on 9 March and towed in to Liverpool.
Clyde Vale	United Kingdom	The smack was driven ashore on Islay.
Columbia	United Kingdom	The ship was driven ashore at Liverpool. She was on a voyage from New York, United States to Liverpool.
Countess	United Kingdom	The schooner was wrecked at Port St. Mary, Isle of Man with some the loss of two of her six crew. She was on a voyage from Liverpool to Newcastle upon Tyne, Northumberland.
Creole	United Kingdom	The ship was driven ashore near Moville, County Donegal. She was refloated on 8 February and taken in to the River Foyle.
Darlington	United Kingdom	The schooner collided with the brig Margaret (United Kingdom) and sank in the North Sea off the coast of Yorkshire. Her crew were rescued. She was on a voyage from Stockholm, Sweden to London.
Elizabeth	(United Kingdom of Great Britain and Ireland) Isle of Man	The ship was driven ashore at Rostrevor, County Down. She was on a voyage from Port St. Mary to Newry, County Antrim. She had been refloated by 19 February and taken in to Warrenpoint, County Down.
Ellen	India	The brig was wrecked at the mouth of the Sittang River. She was on a voyage from Rangoon to Moulmein, Burma.
Eugenia	United Kingdom	The brigantine was wrecked at Portpatrick, Wigtownshire with the loss of seven of her eight crew. She was on a voyage from Liverpool to Dordrecht, South Holland, Netherlands.
Geertruida	Netherlands	The brig was driven ashore at Greenock.
Glenmoriston	United Kingdom	The ship ran aground and was wrecked at Southwold, Suffolk. Her crew were rescued. She was on a voyage from Middlesbrough, Yorkshire to Southwold.
Govan	United Kingdom	The ship was driven ashore and wrecked on the Kyles of Bute with the loss of a crew member.
Henry Pratt	United States	The full-rigged ship was driven ashore at Porth Neigwl, Caernarfonshire with the loss of two of her crew. She was on a voyage from New York to Liverpool.
Lark	United Kingdom	The smack was driven ashore and damaged on Islay.
Lilias	United Kingdom	The ship was run into by Rillerschaft ( Grand Duchy of Mecklenburg-Schwerin) and was abandoned 6 nautical miles (11 km) off Tynemouth, Northumberland. She was on a voyage from Penteivan, Cornwall to the River Tyne. She was towed in to South Shields, County Durham by a tug.
Lively	United Kingdom	The brig was driven ashore and capsized at Ardrossan.
Madonna	United Kingdom	The schooner was driven ashore a Beoch, Wigtownshire and was destroyed by fire when her cargo of quicklime got wet.
Mary	United Kingdom	The ship was driven ashore at Port Ellen, Islay.
Nelly	United Kingdom	The sloop was driven ashore at Kilmun, Argyllshire.
Novelty	United Kingdom	The ship was driven ashore at Lamlash.
Ocean Rover	United Kingdom	The ship was driven ashore and broke her back at Crosby Point. She was on a voyage from Charleston, South Carolina, United States to Liverpool. She was refloated on 22 February and beached.
Origen	United Kingdom	The sloop sank at St. Monance, Fife. Her crew survived. She was on a voyage from Newcastle upon Tyne to Aberdeen. Origen was refloated and taken in to Dundee, Forfarshire the next day in a derelict condition.
Richard Cobden	United Kingdom	The ship was driven ashore at Helensburgh, Argyllshire. She was on a voyage from Glasgow to Genoa, Kingdom of Sardinia. She had become a wreck by 12 February.
Sarah Ann	United Kingdom	The barque was driven ashore at Abererch, Caernarfonshire. Her crew were rescued. Sarah Ann was on a voyage from Pernambuco, Brazil to London. She was refloated on 21 February and taken in to Pwllheli, Caernarfonshire.
Sarah Jane	United Kingdom	The barque was driven ashore and damaged at Pwllheli, Caernarfonshire.
Sirius	United Kingdom	The ship was driven ashore at Bowmore, Islay, Inner Hebrides. She was on a voyage from Liverpool to Sligo.
Spec	United Kingdom	The ship was driven ashore at Greenore Point, County Louth. Her crew were rescued. She was on a voyage from Cardiff, Glamorgan to Cork.
Strang	United Kingdom	The barque was driven ashore at Greenock.
Sumana	Netherlands	The schooner was driven ashore at Jérémie, Haiti.
Talisman	(United Kingdom of Great Britain and Ireland) British North America	The ship was driven ashore at Tobermory, Isle of Mull, Inner Hebrides. She was on a voyage from Saint John, New Brunswick, British North America to Liverpool. She was refloated on 12 February and towed in to Tobermory.
Victoria	United Kingdom	The sloop was driven ashore and severely damaged near Millport. Her crew were rescued.
Walton	United Kingdom	The brig was driven ashore at Greenock.
Wellington	United Kingdom	The ship was driven ashore at Lamlash.
Woodside	United Kingdom	The schooner ran aground and sank in the River Tay. She was refloated on 13 February and beached.

== 7 February ==
List of shipwrecks: 7 February 1856
Ship	State	Description
Advance	United Kingdom	The brig was in a floating dock which sank in a gale at South Shields, County Durham.
Agnes	United Kingdom	The brig was driven ashore on Inchcolm. She was refloated the next day with assistance from a steamship and taken in to Leith, Lothian.
Alma	United Kingdom	The ship was damaged in a gale at Bowling, Dunbartonshire.
Amazon	United Kingdom	The ship was driven onto the Insand, in the North Sea off the coast of County Durham in a gale.
Antelope	United Kingdom	The brig was driven ashore and damaged in a gale at South Shields.
Ariadne	United Kingdom	The ship was severely damaged in a gale at South Shields.
Atalanta	United Kingdom	The barque ran aground at Berbice, British Guiana. She was on a voyage from Berbice to London. She was refloated and resumed her voyage, but consequently put in to Barbados on 28 February in a leaky condition.
Attwood	United Kingdom	The ship was damaged in a gale at South Shields.
Blossom	United Kingdom	The smack ran aground on the Fisherman's Rock, off the coast of Argyllshire with the loss of two of her three crew. She was on a voyage from Moville, County Donegal to the Clyde. She subsequently came ashore at Duntroon, Argyllshire. Blossom was taken in to Crinan, Argyllshire on 14 February.
Brimas	United Kingdom	The ship was driven onto the Insand in a gale.
Brothers	United Kingdom	The fishing smack was wrecked in Morecambe Bay. Her crew were rescued.
Caroline and Henrietta	United Kingdom	The ship was driven onto the Insand in a gale.
Catherine	United Kingdom	The sloop was driven out to sea from Leith. No further trace, presumed foundered with the loss of all hands.
Centenary	United Kingdom	The ship was damaged in a gale at South Shields.
Challenger	United Kingdom	The brig ran aground on the Haisborough Sands, in the North Sea off the coast of Norfolk. She was on a voyage from London to Leith. She was refloated and taken in to Sunderland, County Durham, where she arrived on 10 February in a leaky condition.
Chancellor	United Kingdom	The paddle steamer was driven ashore and severely damaged at Bowling.
Commercial Packet	United Kingdom	The sloop was driven ashore and wrecked near North Berwick, Lothian.
Countess of Westmorland	United Kingdom	The ship was damaged in a gale at South Shields.
Craignish Castle	United Kingdom	The paddle steamer was severely damaged in a gale at Bowling.
Deolindo	(United Kingdom of Great Britain and Ireland) Guernsey	The ship was damaged in a gale at South Shields.
Eagle	United Kingdom	The ship was damaged in a gale at South Shields.
Eagle	United Kingdom	The steamship was driven ashore and wrecked at Bowling.
Edward Bilton	United Kingdom	The ship was damaged in a gale at South Shields.
Enrico	Portugal	The barque was damaged in a gale at South Shields.
Equator	United Kingdom	The brig was wrecked on the Northumberland Reef, off Cape Agulhas, Cape Colony. Her crew survived. She was on a voyage from Colombo, Ceylon to London.
Ernomango	United Kingdom	The ship was driven from her moorings and collided with Cambria (United Kingdom) at Bowling.
Eugenia	United Kingdom	The brigantine was wrecked at Portpatrick, Wigtownshire with the loss of six of her seven crew. She was on a voyage from Liverpool, Lancashire to Dordrecht, South Holland, Netherlands.
Europa	Portugal	The barque was damaged in a gale at South Shields.
Eva	United Kingdom	The sloop was wrecked on the Chicken Rock, Isle of Man. She was on a voyage from Peel, Isle of Man to Chester, Cheshire.
Evadne	United Kingdom	The ship was damaged in a gale at South Shields.
Express	United Kingdom	The ship was damaged in a gale at South Shields.
Fibra	Sweden	The schooner capsized in a gale at South Shields.
Flying Fish	United Kingdom	The ship was driven onto the Insand in a gale.
Forth	United Kingdom	The gabbart was wrecked in Gourock Bay with the loss of all three people on board.
Frances	United Kingdom	The lighter sank at Greenock, Renfrewshire. She was later refloated.
Gemini	United Kingdom	The ship was damaged in a gale at South Shields.
George Glen	United Kingdom	The brig foundered in the North Sea 50 nautical miles (93 km) off the north east coast of County Durham. Her crew were rescued by St. Martin (France).
Glow-worm	United Kingdom	The steamship was driven ashore and damaged at Bowling.
Helen	United Kingdom	The lighter was driven ashore in a gale at Douglas, Lanarkshire.
Hercules	United Kingdom	The ship was wrecked in a gale at South Shields.
Idis	United Kingdom	The ship was damaged in a gale at South Shields.
Invincible	United Kingdom	The ship was damaged in a gale at Bowling.
Isabella	United Kingdom	The ship was damaged in a gale at South Shields.
Isabella	United Kingdom	The ship was severely damaged at Elie, Fife when Myrtle (United Kingdom) drove into her.
James and Francis	United Kingdom	The ship was driven onto the Insand in a gale.
Jane	United Kingdom	The gabbart was wrecked in Gourock Bay.
Janet	United Kingdom	The lighter sank in a gale at Douglas, Lanarkshire.
Jannets	United Kingdom	The ship was driven ashore at Dumfries. She was on a voyage from Bangor, Caernarfonshire to Dumfries. She was refloated on 11 February.
Jean	United Kingdom	The ship was driven ashore on Islay, Inner Hebrides. She was on a voyage from Liverpool to Sligo.
Jean and Margaret	United Kingdom	The ship was driven ashore at Torcliff Point, Dumfriesshire.
John White	United Kingdom	The ship was damaged in a gale at South Shields.
Lady Brisbane	United Kingdom	The paddle steamer ran aground off Largs, Ayrshire. Her passengers were taken off. She was later refloated.
Lawson	United Kingdom	The ship was damaged in a gale at South Shields.
Leo	(United Kingdom of Great Britain and Ireland) Guernsey	The brig was damaged in a gale at South Shields.
Lucy Neal	United Kingdom	The ship was driven ashore at "Rhomeheran", Argyllshire. She was on a voyage from Ballina, County Mayo to Fleetwood, Lancashire.
Maid of the Mill	United Kingdom	The gabbart capsized at Rhu, Dunbartonshire with the loss of two of her crew.
Majestic	United Kingdom	The barque was damaged in a gale at South Shields.
Malta	United Kingdom	The ship was damaged in a gale at South Shields.
Maria	United Kingdom	The ship was abandoned off Robin Hoods Bay, Yorkshire. Her crew were rescued. She was on a voyage from Rye, Sussex to Sunderland. She was taken in to Scarborough, Yorkshire in a derelict condition on 9 February.
Marion Davies	United Kingdom	The ship was driven ashore on Islay. She was on a voyage from Liverpool to Westport, County Mayo.
Martha	United Kingdom	The schooner was driven ashore on Læsø, Denmark. Her crew were rescued. She was on a voyage from Hartlepool, County Durham to Nyborg, Denmark. She was declared a total loss.
Mary and Ellen	United Kingdom	The ship was driven ashore at Bowness-on-Solway, Cumberland. She was on a voyage from Preston, Lancashire to Port Carlisle, Cumberland.
Mary Pring	United Kingdom	The ship was damaged in a gale at South Shields.
Matilda	United Kingdom	The brig was severely damaged in a gale at South Shields.
Merlin	United Kingdom	The steamship was driven ashore and broke her back at Bowling.
Mobile	United States	The ship was driven ashore on Islay, Inner Hebrides, United Kingdom and was severely damaged. She was on a voyage from Mobile, Alabama to Liverpool.
Murray	United Kingdom	The ship was driven onto the Steel Ends Rocks, on the coast of Northumberland and sank. She was on a voyage from Bo'ness, Lothian to Newcastle upon Tyne, Northumberland. She was refloated on 15 February and towed in to Berwick upon Tweed, Northumberland for repairs.
North American	United Kingdom	The steamship was driven ashore at Dumbarton. She was refloated on 9 February.
Ocean	United Kingdom	The ship was damaged in a gale at South Shields.
Penelope	United Kingdom	The ship was damaged in a gale at South Shields.
HMS Perseverance	Royal Navy	The troopship ran aground west of Portland Bill, Dorset.
Premier	United Kingdom	The paddle steamer was driven ashore at Bowling.
Premium	United Kingdom	The ship was damaged in a gale at South Shields.
Red Rover	United Kingdom	The brig was driven ashore and wrecked on the Troad, Ottoman Empire.
Rosebud	United Kingdom	The ship was driven onto the Insand in a gale.
Rosina	United Kingdom	The ship was driven against the quayside and severely damaged at Annan, Dumfriesshire.
Royalist	United Kingdom	The ship was driven onto the Insand in a gale.
Seabird	United Kingdom	The ship foundered in the North Sea. Her crew were rescued.
Servius	United Kingdom	The ship was damaged in a gale at South Shields.
Sir Charles Napier	Norway	The ship was driven onto the Insand in a gale.
Sirius	United Kingdom	The ship was damaged in a gale at South Shields.
Sirocco	United Kingdom	The brig was driven ashore at Blyth, Northumberland.
Sylph	Not flagged	The paddle tug, under construction, was severely damaged in a gale at Jarrow when William Shepherd United Kingdom was driven into her and crushing her against the quayside.
Tempest	United Kingdom	The clipper ship was driven ashore and capsized in the Clyde at Greenock. She was refloated on 12 March and towed in to Greenock.
Theresa	United Kingdom	The brig foundered in the North Sea 30 nautical miles (56 km) off Tynemouth, Northumberland. Her crew were rescued.
Venus	United Kingdom	The paddle steamer was severely damaged in a gale in Bowling Bay.
Venus	United Kingdom	The ship was damaged in a gale at South Shields.
Wellington	United Kingdom	The paddle steamer was run into by Sir Colin Campbell and was severely damaged in a gale in Bowling Bay. She was later taken in to Glasgow for repairs.
William Sheppard	United Kingdom	The ship was severely damaged in a gale at Jarrow, County Durham with the loss of a crew member.
xxxx	flag unknown (foreign)	The brig was driven onto the Insand in a gale.
xxxx	Netherlands	The galiot was driven onto the Insand in a gale.
xxxx	Denmark	The brig was driven onto the Insand in a gale.-->

== 8 February ==
List of shipwrecks: 8 February 1856
Ship	State	Description
Alma	United Kingdom	The ship was driven ashore west of Boulogne, Pas-de-Calais, France. She was on a voyage from Jersey, Channel Islands to Shoreham-by-Sea, Sussex.
Ann	United Kingdom	The sloop was driven ashore and wrecked at Newcastle upon Tyne, Northumberland with the loss of all hands.
Bon Leon	France	The derelict lugger was driven ashore and wrecked north west of Porthcawl, Glamorgan, United Kingdom.
Catherine Jenkins	United Kingdom	The barque was driven ashore and wrecked in Lucas Cove, Glamorgan, with the loss of seven or eight of her eleven crew. She was on a voyage from Santiago de Cuba, Cuba, to Swansea, Glamorgan, Wales.
Great Duke	United States	The full-rigged ship was driven ashore and wrecked in Portslaughter Bay with the loss of 30 of her 33 crew. She was on a voyage from New Orleans, Louisiana to Liverpool, Lancashire, United Kingdom.
Helen	United Kingdom	The barque struck an iceberg in the Atlantic Ocean and was abandoned. Her crew were rescued by the brigantine Pursuit (United Kingdom). Helen was on a voyage from Saint John, New Brunswick, British North America to Montrose, Forfarshire.
Kitty's Wake	United Kingdom	The ship was abandoned in the North Sea off Dunbar, Lothian. She was on a voyage from Sunderland, County Durham to Port Dundas, Renfrewshire.
Sultan	United Kingdom	The ship was abandoned in the North Sea 40 nautical miles (74 km) off Tynemouth, Northumberland. Her crew were rescued by Selby (United Kingdom). Sultan was on a voyage from South Shields, County Durham to Lisbon, Portugal. She was taken in tow by two schooners and arrived at South Shields in a derelict condition on 9 February.
Tirzah	United Kingdom	The ship was wrecked in the Black Sea. Her crew were rescued.

== 9 February ==
List of shipwrecks: 9 February 1856
Ship	State	Description
George Glen	United Kingdom	The brig was discovered abandoned 30 nautical miles (56 km) off Scarborough, Yorkshire by the smack Welcome (United Kingdom). Eight holes had been bored in her bottom. Some of the holes were stopped, and an attempt was made to take her into port, but she had to be abandoned and subsequently foundered.
Imbert	(United Kingdom of Great Britain and Ireland) British North America	The brig was wrecked in the Berry Islands, Bahamas. She was on a voyage from Jamaica to Bremen.
Maria	United Kingdom	The ship was wrecked near Lagos, Portugal.
Onderneming	Netherlands	The ship foundered in the North Sea off the coast of Yorkshire, United Kingdom. Her crew were rescued. She was on a voyage from Amsterdam, North Holland to Newcastle upon Tyne, Northumberland, United Kingdom.
St. Martin	France	The ship was in collision with William Henry (United Kingdom) and sank in the North Sea. All on board were rescued by William Henry. Saint Martin was on a voyage from Caen, Calvados to Blyth, Northumberland.
Traube	Stettin	The ship was wrecked at Torekov, Sweden. She was on a voyage from Sunderland, County Durham, United Kingdom to Stettin.

== 10 February ==
List of shipwrecks: 10 February 1856
Ship	State	Description
Augusta	United Kingdom	The ship struck a rock off the coast of County Clare and was damaged. She was on a voyage from Demerara, British Guiana to Liverpool, Lancashire.
Edith	United Kingdom	The schooner was driven ashore and wrecked at Cartaya, Spain. She was on a voyage from Seville, Spain to London.
Lean Racer	United States	The schooner was driven ashore and wrecked at Cape Henry, Virginia. She was on a voyage from Palermo, Sicily to Baltimore, Maryland.
Pauline	Kingdom of Hanover	The brig was driven ashore and wrecked at "Talboll", Denmark. Her crew were rescued. She was on a voyage from Bremen to Newcastle upon Tyne, Northumberland, United Kingdom.
Singular	United Kingdom	The ship ran aground on the Haisborough Sands, in the North Sea off the coast of Norfolk. She was on a voyage from Antwerp, Belgium to Bilbao, Spain. She was refloated and assisted in to Great Yarmouth, Norfolk.

== 11 February ==
List of shipwrecks: 11 February 1856
Ship	State	Description
Amelia	United Kingdom	The ship was driven ashore and wrecked at Jersey, Channel Islands. She was on a voyage from Saint Helier, Jersey to Liverpool, Lancashire. She was refloated on 13 February but was driven onto the Rockquiter. She was refloated on 20 February and taken in to Saint Helier, Jersey.
John	United Kingdom	The barque was driven ashore at Staithes, Yorkshire.
Maria	United Kingdom	The schooner was run down and sunk in the Irish Sea off the Copeland Island Lighthouse by Niger (United Kingdom). Her crew were rescued.
Resolucão	Portugal	The ship sprang a leak and was beached with the loss of about 50 lives. There were about 360 survivors. She was on a voyage from Macao, China to Havana, Cuba.

== 12 February ==
List of shipwrecks: 12 February 1856
Ship	State	Description
Driver	United Kingdom	The ship departed from Liverpool, Lancashire for New York, United States. No further trace, presumed foundered with the loss of all hands.
J. G. Hall	United Kingdom	The ship was driven ashore in Carskey Bay, Argyllshire. She was on a voyage from Ardrossan, Ayrshire to Corfu, United States of the Ionian Islands.
Mary Hartley	United Kingdom	The barque foundered in the Atlantic Ocean. Her crew survived. She was on a voyage from Pernambuco, Brazil to Liverpool.
New Union	United Kingdom	The schooner was driven ashore at Marske-by-the-Sea, Yorkshire and was abandoned by her crew. She was on a voyage from Seaham, County Durham to London. She was refloated on 15 February and taken in to Hartlepool, County Durham.
Polonais	France	The ship was driven onto the Longhorne Sands, Glamorgan, United Kingdom and was wrecked. Her crew were rescued. She was on a voyage from Brest, Finistère to Swansea, Glamorgan.
Proteous	United Kingdom	The ship was wrecked on the coast of County Wexford with the loss of one of her fourteen crew. Survivors were rescued by the fishing smack Sarah (United Kingdom). Proteous was on a voyage from Liverpool to Jamaica.
Success	United Kingdom	The ship was run ashore in Carskey Bay with the loss of her captain. She was on a voyage from Maryport, Cumberland to Belfast, County Antrim.
William Carey	United Kingdom	The ship ran aground in Carnarvon Bay with the loss of one of her twenty crew. Survivors were rescued by the Llandwyn Lifeboat. William Carey was on a voyage from Calcutta, India to Liverpool, Lancashire. She was refloated and taken in to Caernarfon.

== 13 February ==
List of shipwrecks: 13 February 1856
Ship	State	Description
Enniskillen	United Kingdom	The steamship ran ashore at Maughold Head, Isle of Man. She was on a voyage from Liverpool, Lancashire to Londonderry. She was refloated and taken in to Ramsey, Isle of Man in a leaky condition. Subsequently repaired at Liverpool.
Margiena	Netherlands	The ship ran aground on the Wicklow Bank, in the Irish Sea. She was refloated and put in to Holyhead, Anglesey, United Kingdom in a leaky condition. She was on a voyage from Liverpool to Seville, Spain.
Princess Victoria	United Kingdom	The schooner was driven ashore at Hartlepool, County Durham.
Queen	United Kingdom	The ship struck the South Maiden Rocks and sank. Her crew were rescued. She was on a voyage from Troon, Ayrshire to Belfast, County Antrim.

== 14 February ==
List of shipwrecks: 14 February 1856
Ship	State	Description
Unity	United Kingdom	The brigantine ran aground on the Whittaker Spit and was holed by her anchor. She was on a voyage from South Shields, County Durham to London. She was refloated with assistance from five smacks and assisted in to Wivenhoe, Essex.

== 15 February ==
List of shipwrecks: 15 February 1856
Ship	State	Description
Brigand	United Kingdom	The schooner ran aground at Hartlepool, County Durham. She was refloated and taken in to Hartlepool.
Mangalore	United Kingdom	The ship was abandoned in the Atlantic Ocean. Her crew were rescued by Emerald (United Kingdom). Mangalore was on a voyage from Mauritius to Queenstown, County Cork.
Ocean Queen	United Kingdom	The steamship was sighted off the Isle of Wight whilst on a voyage from London to New York, United States. No further trace, presumed foundered with the loss of all 110 people on board.

== 16 February ==
List of shipwrecks: 16 February 1856
Ship	State	Description
Caleb	United Kingdom	The barque ran aground on the Holm Sand, in the North Sea off the coast of Suffolk. She was on a voyage from South Shields, County Durham to London. She was refloated and resumed her voyage.
Deptford	United Kingdom	The barque ran aground in the Black Sea. She was later refloated with assistance from the steamship Contrast (United Kingdom).
Don Antonio	Netherlands	The ship ran aground on the Burbo Bank, in Liverpool Bay. She was on a voyage from Liverpool, Lancashire, United Kingdom to Cardiff, Glamorgan, United Kingdom. She had been refloated by 19 February and resumed her voyage.
Howard Tagus	(United Kingdom of Great Britain and Ireland) British North America	The ship was wrecked at the mouth of the Tagus. She was on a voyage from Saint John, New Brunswick to Lisbon, Portugal.
Pace	Kingdom of Sardinia	The barque struck a sunken rock 40 nautical miles (74 km) east of Boa Vista, Cape Verde Islands and was abandoned. Her crew were rescued. She was on a voyage from Málaga, Spain to Rio de Janeiro, Brazil. She was subsequently taken in to Demerara, British Guiana on 28 March in a derelict condition.
Sabrina	United Kingdom	The barque ran aground on the Holm Sand. She was on a voyage from South Shields to London. She was refloated and resumed her voyage.
Success	United Kingdom	The brig ran aground on the Burbo Bank. She was on a voyage from Trieste to Liverpool. She was refloated on 18 February and taken in to Liverpool.

== 17 February ==
List of shipwrecks: 17 February 1856
Ship	State	Description
Comorn	United Kingdom	The brigantine was in collision with the steamship Butjadingen (flag unknown) in The Down. She was on a voyage from Sunderland, County Durham to Folkestone, Kent. She was assisted in to Dover, Kent in a sinking condition.
Despatch	United Kingdom	The schooner was driven ashore at Penman Point, Anglesey She was refloated.
Falcon	United Kingdom	The steamship struck a sunken rock and sank off Cape Varkos, Lesbos, Greece. Her crew were rescued. She was on a voyage from Constantinople to Smyrna, Ottoman Empire.
Henrietta	France	The sloop was driven ashore near New Romney, Kent, United Kingdom. She was on a voyage from Dunkerque, Nord to Morlaix, Finistère.
Hope	United Kingdom	The ship ran aground on the Thorpeness Reef, in the North Sea off the coast of Suffolk. She floated off, but was driven ashore and wrecked at Thorpeness. Her crew were rescued, but a rescuer was drowned. She was on a voyage from the Clyde to Woolwich, Kent and London.
Hubertus	Stettin	The brig ran aground on the Cheek Stone. She was refloated and beached at Dartmouth Castle, Devon, United Kingdom, where she was wrecked. Her crew were rescued. She was on a voyage from Sunderland, County Durham to Bordeaux, Gironde, France.
J. H. Boardman	United States	The ship ran aground at the mouth of the Mississippi River.
Weymouth	United Kingdom	The ship ran aground at the mouth of the Mississippi River.

== 18 February ==
List of shipwrecks: 18 February 1856
Ship	State	Description
Agnes, and Saratoga	United States	The full-rigged ship Agnes was driven against the schooner Saratoga by ice at New Castle, Delaware. Both vessels were damaged.
Clansman	United Kingdom	The barque was abandoned in the Atlantic Ocean. Her crew were rescued by Cambria' (United Kingdom). Clansman was on a voyage from Savannah, Georgia, United States to Greenock, Renfrewshire.
Friendship	United Kingdom	The ship was abandoned in the North Sea off the Farne Islands, Northumberland. Her crew were rescued by Rose in June (United Kingdom). Friendship was on a voyage from the River Tyne to Aberdeen.
Helen	United Kingdom	The ship was driven ashore at Great Yarmouth, Norfolk. She was on a voyage from Great Yarmouth to London.
Rapid	United Kingdom	The brig was wrecked at Sambro, Nova Scotia, British North America. Her crew were rescued. She was on a voyage from Antigua to Halifax, Nova Scotia.
Sarah	United Kingdom	The full-rigged ship ran aground on the Memory Rock, Bahamas. She was on a voyage from Matanzas, Cuba to the Clyde. She was refloated.
Wilhelmina	United Kingdom	The ship was lost off Bourgas, Ottoman Empire with the loss of six of her crew. She was on a voyage from the Danube to a British port.

== 19 February ==
List of shipwrecks: 19 February 1856
Ship	State	Description
Bess	United Kingdom	The ship ran aground, capsized and sank at "Hantoon". She was on a voyage from Liverpool, Lancashire to Waterford.
Ibis	(United Kingdom of Great Britain and Ireland) Jersey	The cutter struck a sunken rock and foundered off Jersey. Her crew were rescued. She was on a voyage from Plymouth, Devon to Jersey. She was refloated on 20 February and taken in to Jersey.

== 20 February ==
List of shipwrecks: 20 February 1856
Ship	State	Description
Edina	United Kingdom	The ship was driven ashore in Elbury Cove, Devon. Her crew were rescued. She was on a voyage from Newcastle upon Tyne, Northumberland to Constantinople, Ottoman Empire. She was refloated on 8 March with assistance from the tug Lord Yarborough (United Kingdom) and taken in to Dartmouth, Devon in a severely leaky condition.
Harriet	United Kingdom	The ship sprang a leak and was beached at Ramsey, Isle of Man. Her crew were rescued. She was on a voyage from Londonderry to Liverpool, Lancashire.
Hermine	Stralsund	The brig was driven ashore at "Palmerort", Prussia. She was on a voyage from Sunderland, County Durham, United Kingdom to Stettin and Stralsund.
John Rutledge	United States	The ship struck an iceberg and sank in the Atlantic Ocean with the loss of 148 of the 149 people on board. One survivor was rescued by Germania (United States). Four boats containing survivors were reported missing. John Rutledge was on a voyage from Liverpool, Lancashire, United Kingdom to New York.

== 21 February ==
List of shipwrecks: 21 February 1856
Ship	State	Description
Hero	United Kingdom	The ship ran aground in the River Moy. She was on a voyage from Liverpool, Lancashire to Ballina, County Mayo. She was refloated and taken in to Ballina.
Solo	United Kingdom	The ship struck a sunken rock off Kenmare, County Kerry and was damaged. She was towed in to Queenstown, County Cork for repairs.

== 22 February ==
List of shipwrecks: 22 February 1856
Ship	State	Description
Astarte	United Kingdom	The ship ran aground at Rio de Janeiro, Brazil. She was on a voyage from Rio de Janeiro to Liverpool, Lancashire. She was refloated and resumed her voyage.
Catherine	United Kingdom	The schooner was driven ashore at Eyemouth, Berwickshire. She was on a voyage from Nairn to Sunderland, County Durham. She was refloated and put in to Eyemouth.
Iris	United Kingdom	The ship was driven ashore on the Île du Ré, Charente-Inférieure, France. She was on a voyage from Sunderland to the Charente. She had become a wreck by 27 February.
Sylph	United Kingdom	The ship ran aground in the Black Sea.

== 23 February ==
List of shipwrecks: 23 February 1856
Ship	State	Description
Catherine	Norway	The barque struck the Barrels Rocks, off the Smalls Lighthouse and sank. Her crew survived. She was on a voyage from Queenstown, County Cork, to Cardiff, Glamorgan, United Kingdom.
Hope	(United Kingdom of Great Britain and Ireland) British North America	The schooner was wrecked in Bow Bay, Cape Breton Island, Nova Scotia with the loss of a crew member. She was on a voyage from Newfoundland to Halifax, Nova Scotia.
Ramsgate	United Kingdom	The sloop foundered in the North Sea 9 nautical miles (17 km) north east of Dimlington, Yorkshire. Her crew were rescued by the pilot boat No. 6. (United Kingdom). Ramsgate was on a voyage from Newcastle upon Tyne, Northumberland to London.

== 24 February ==
List of shipwrecks: 24 February 1856
Ship	State	Description
Albertine	United States	The sternwheeler was sunk by ice in the Ohio River at Cincinnati, Ohio.
Bridge City	United States	The sternwheeler was sunk by ice at Cincinnati.
Flag	United States	The sternwheeler was sunk by ice at Cincinnati.
Grapeshot	United States	The sternwheeler was sunk by ice at Cincinnati.
Madonna	United States	The sternwheeler was sunk by ice at Cincinnati.
Salem	United States	The sternwheeler was sunk by ice at Cincinnati.
Yorktown	United States	The sternwheeler was sunk by ice at Cincinnati.

== 25 February ==
List of shipwrecks: 25 February 1856
Ship	State	Description
Archimedes	United States	The full-rigged ship was abandoned in the Atlantic Ocean. Her crew were rescued by Abram (Netherlands). Archimedes was on a voyage from South Shields, County Durham, United Kingdom to Boston, Massachusetts.
Croxdale	United Kingdom	The ship ran aground at Middlesbrough, Yorkshire. She was on a voyage from Middlesbrough to Genoa, Kingdom of Sardinia. She was refloated and put in to Hartlepool, County Durham in a leaky condition.
R. L. Gilchrist	United States	The full-rigged ship caught fire at New Orleans, Louisiana.
Romp	(United Kingdom of Great Britain and Ireland) British North America	The schooner was driven ashore by ice near Yarmouth, Nova Scotia. She was on a voyage from Prince Edward Island to Boston, Massachusetts, United States.
Romulus	United Kingdom	The ship was abandoned in the Atlantic Ocean. Her crew were rescued by Chariot of Fame (United States). Romulus was on a voyage from Saint John, New Brunswick, British North America to Bristol, Gloucestershire.
Vanguard	United Kingdom	The barque ran aground on the Broadstairs Knoll, off the coast of Kent. She was on a voyage from London to Melbourne, Victoria. She was refloated and resumed her voyage.
Zodiacus	United Kingdom	The ship was wrecked on Samana Cay, Bahamas. She was on a voyage from Saint Domingo to a British port.

== 26 February ==
List of shipwrecks: 26 February 1856
Ship	State	Description
A. B. Chambers	United States	The steamboat was damaged by ice in the Missouri River at St. Louis, Missouri.
A. C. Goddin	United States	The steamboat was damaged by ice in the Missouri River at St. Louis.
Adriatic	United States	The steamboat was severely damaged by ice in the Missouri River at St. Louis.
Alice	United States	The steamboat was driven ashore and damaged by ice in the Missouri River at St. Louis.
Altoona	United States	The steamboat was severely damaged by ice in the Missouri River at St. Louis.
Australia	United States	The steamboat was by severely damaged ice in the Missouri River at St. Louis.
Badger State	United States	The steamboat was driven ashore and damaged by ice in the Missouri River at St. Louis.
Ben Bolt	United States	The steamboat was severely damaged by ice in the Missouri River at St. Louis.
Bon Accord	United States	The steamboat was by wrecked ice and sank in the Missouri River at St. Louis.
Brunette	United States	The steamboat was severely damaged by ice in the Missouri River at St. Louis.
Challenge	United States	The steamboat was severely damaged by ice in the Missouri River at St. Louis.
Clara	United States	The steamboat was severely damaged by ice in the Missouri River at St. Louis.
Die Vernon	United States	The steamboat was damaged by ice in the Missouri River at St. Louis.
Dunedin	United Kingdom	The steamship ran aground off Bosch, Groningen, Netherlands.
Falls City	United States	The steamboat was severely damaged by ice in the Missouri River at St. Louis.
Federal Arch	United States	The steamboat was wrecked by ice and sank in the Missouri River at St. Louis.
Forest Rose	United States	The steamboat was sunk by ice in the Missouri River at St. Louis.
F. X. Aubry	United States	The steamboat was driven ashore and severely damage by ice in the Missouri River at St. Louis.
Gossamer	United States	The steamboat was driven ashore and damaged by ice in the Missouri River at St. Louis.
G. W. Sparhawk	United States	The steamboat was sunk by ice in the Missouri River at St. Louis.
Henry Warburton	United Kingdom	The brig struck a sunken rock and sank at Alexandria, Egypt.
Highland Mary	United States	The steamboat was wrecked by ice and sank in the Missouri River at St. Louis.
Isabella	United Kingdom	The ship ran aground on the Barber Sand, in the North Sea off the coast of Suffolk. She was on a voyage from London to Leith, Lothian. She was refloated and taken in to Lowestoft, Suffolk.
Jeannie Deands	United States	The steamboat was severely damaged by ice in the Missouri River at St. Louis.
Jenny Lind	United States	The steamboat was severely damaged by ice in the Missouri River at St. Louis.
J. S. Pringle	United States	The steamboat was by ice in the Missouri River at St. Louis.
Laclede	United States	The steamboat was damaged by ice in the Missouri River at St. Louis.
Lamartine	United States	The steamboat was severely damaged by ice in the Missouri River at St. Louis.
Louisville	United States	The steamboat was wrecked by ice in the Missouri River at St. Louis.
Luella	United States	The steamboat was driven ashore and damaged by ice in the Missouri River at St. Louis.
Minnesota	United States	The steamboat was damaged by ice in the Missouri River at St. Louis.
Nebraska	United States	The steamboat was damaged by ice in the Missouri River at St. Louis.
New St. Paul	United States	The steamboat was severely damaged by ice in the Missouri River at St. Louis.
N. L. Milburn	United States	The steamboat was damaged by ice in the Missouri River at St. Louis.
Paul Jones	United States	The steamboat was severely damaged by ice in the Missouri River at St. Louis.
Polar Star	United States	The steamboat was by sunk ice in the Missouri River at St. Louis.
Sam Cloon	United States	The steamboat was wrecked by ice and sank in the Missouri River at St. Louis.
Sarah	United Kingdom	The ship was abandoned off the coast of Surinam. She subsequently came ashore near the mouth of the Pomeroon River. She was on a voyage from Belfast, County Antrim to Surinam.
Shenandoa	United States	The steamboat was wrecked by ice and sank in the Missouri River at St. Louis.
Sonora	United States	The steamboat was sunk by ice in the Missouri River upstream of St. Louis.
Submarine No. 4	United States	The steamboat was wrecked by ice and sank in the Missouri River at St. Louis.
Submarine No. 8	United States	The steamboat was severely damaged by ice in the Missouri River at St. Louis.
Westerner	United States	The steamboat was damaged by ice in the Missouri River at St. Louis.
Wiggin's Ferry	United States	The steamboat was severely damaged by ice in the Missouri River at St. Louis.
William Baird	United States	The steamboat was damaged by ice in the Missouri River at St. Louis.

== 27 February ==
List of shipwrecks: 27 February 1856
Ship	State	Description
Arctic	United Kingdom	The whaler ran aground at Peterhead, Aberdeenshire. She was refloated and resumed her voyage to Greenland waters.
Sarah	United Kingdom	The ship capsized off the coast of British Guiana and was abandoned. Her crew were rescued by Nugget (United Kingdom). Sarah was on a voyage from Suriname to Belfast, County Antrim.
Telegraph	United States	The ship caught fire and was scuttled near Savannah, Georgia. She was on a voyage from Savannah to Australia. She had been refloated by 17 March and taken in to Savannah.

== 28 February ==
List of shipwrecks: 28 February 1856
Ship	State	Description
City of Worcester	United Kingdom	The steamship ran aground in the Aran Islands, County Galway and was wrecked. All on board were rescued. She was on a voyage from Westport, County Mayo to Liverpool, Lancashire.
Emperor	United Kingdom	The paddle steamer was driven ashore and wrecked at Cádiz, Spain. She was on a voyage from Liverpool to Constantinople, Ottoman Empire.
Valkyrien	Norway	The schooner was wrecked at Höganäs, Sweden. Her crew were rescued. She was on a voyage from Hartlepool, County Durham, United Kingdom to Malmö, Sweden. She was later refloated and towed in to Helsingør, Denmark for repairs, arriving on 2 April.

== 29 February ==
List of shipwrecks: 29 February 1856
Ship	State	Description
Beehive	United Kingdom	The schooner collided with the paddle steamer Leith (United Kingdom) and was abandoned in the North Sea 15 nautical miles (28 km) off the Dudgeon Shoal. Her crew were rescued by Leith. Beehive was on a voyage from Hartlepool, County Durham to London.
Eliza	United Kingdom	The ship was wrecked near "Cape St. Angelo", Greece. Her crew were rescued by a Royal Sardinian Navy frigate. She was on a voyage from Constantinople, Ottoman Empire to Cardiff, Glamorgan.

== Unknown date ==
List of shipwrecks: Unknown date in February 1856
Ship	State	Description
Alice	United Kingdom	The tug ran aground and sank in the River Ribble in late February. She was refloated and placed under repair.
Atalanta	United Kingdom	The barque ran aground at Berbice, British Guiana. She was on a voyage from Berbice to London. She was refloated and resumed her voyage, but sprang a leak four days later and consequently put in to Barbados, where she arrived on 13 February.
Balaklava	United Kingdom	The ship was driven ashore whilst on a voyage from Mobile, Alabama, United States to Liverpool, Lancashire. She was refloated on 3 February and taken in to Key West, Florida, United States, where she was condemned.
Boyne	United Kingdom	The ship was wrecked 4 nautical miles (7.4 km) north of Shabla Point, Ottoman Empire before 5 February. Her crew were rescued.
Bride of the Sea	United Kingdom	The ship was driven ashore and wrecked at the New Fort, in the Bosphorus before 4 February.
Coriolanus	United Kingdom	The barque was wrecked in the Dardanelles at "Lampensus", Ottoman Empire between 18 and 25 February.
Estrella	Flag unknown	The ship ran aground before 23 February.
Falcon	United Kingdom	The brig was damaged by ice at Annapolis, Maryland.
Henry Wells	United States	The steamship was wrecked at Honda before 23 February.
Index	United Kingdom	The brig was abandoned in the Atlantic Ocean.
Iron Duke	United Kingdom	The barque ran aground off "Port William", Mauritius before 21 February. She was refloated and taken in to Mauritius for repairs.
Isabel	United States	The ship struck a submerged object and sank before 23 February.
Jane	United Kingdom	The schooner ran aground on the Herd Sand, in the North Sea off the coast of County Durham. Her crew were rescued by a fishing boat. She was on a voyage from London to Newcastle upon Tyne, Northumberland. She was refloated and taken in to South Shields, County Durham on 18 January.
J. D. Norton	United Kingdom	The brig was abandoned in the Atlantic Ocean before 20 February.
Julia Ann	United States	The ship was wrecked on Scilly, Society Islands before 20 February with the loss of five lives. She was on a voyage from Sydney, New South Wales to San Francisco, California.
L'Invincible	France	The chasse-marée sank off Portland, Dorset, United Kingdom. She was refloated and towed in to Weymouth, Dorset.
Lavinia Adams	United Kingdom	The ship sank off the coast of Florida, United States. Her crew were rescued. She was on a voyage from Liverpool to New Orleans, Louisiana.
Lucinda Sears	United States	The ship was driven ashore and wrecked at Constantinople, Ottoman Empire before 25 February.
Maria Catharina	Netherlands	The ship was driven ashore at Brindisi, Kingdom of the Two Sicilies. She was on a voyage from Trieste to Rotterdam, South Holland.
Ocean Guide	United Kingdom	The ship ran aground in the Dardanelles before 28 February.
Puffin	United Kingdom	The steamship was wrecked at Lagos whilst trying to salvage the guns from HMS Hecate (Royal Navy).
Roxana	United Kingdom	The ship foundered off the coast of Spain on or before 11 February. Her crew were rescued. She was on a voyage from Newcastle upon Tyne to .New York
Sabrina	United Kingdom	The steamship ran aground in the River Avon. She was on a voyage from Bristol, Gloucestershire to Cork. She was refloated on 6 March and towed back to Bristol for repairs.
Sea Sprite	United Kingdom	The ship was sighted off Rattray Head, Caithness whilst on a voyage from Newcastle upon Tyne to Stromness, Orkney Islands. No further trace, presumed foundered with the loss of all hands.
Sola	Spain	The ship struck a sunken rock off Kenmare, County Kerry, United Kingdom and was damaged. She was on a voyage from Havana, Cuba to Liverpool. She was towed in to Cork on 28 February for repairs.
Sylph	United Kingdom	The steamship ran aground at Penlee Point, Rame, Cornwall. She was on a voyage from Dublin to London. She was refloated and taken in to Millbay, Plymouth, where she arrived on 22 February.
William	United Kingdom	The ship ran aground on the Herd Sand. She was refloated on 11 February.
Yorkshire	United Kingdom	The ship was driven ashore by ice at New York, United States. She was on a voyage from Liverpool to New York.
