= Ned's Point Fort =

Coordinates: 55.141°N 7.474°W

- County Donegal; Ireland
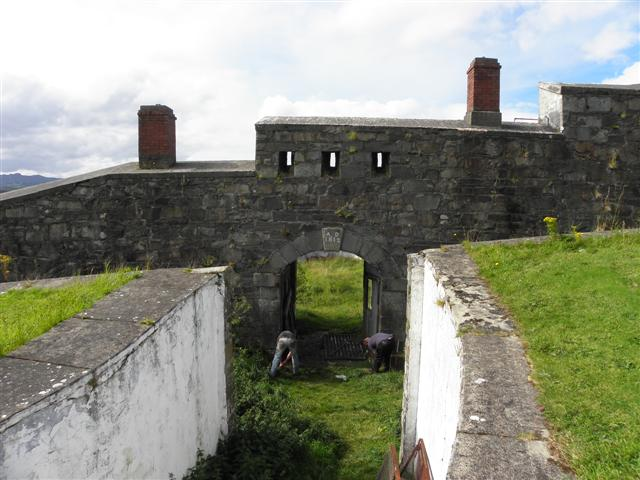
- Ned's Point Fort entrance gate

Site information
- Owner: Local authority
- Open to the public: No
- Condition: Intact

Location

Site history
- Built: 1812-1813; Reconstructed 1895-1899
- Materials: Stone, concrete, earth

Garrison information
- Garrison: British Armed Forces

Ned's Point Fort is one of several Napoleonic batteries built along the shores of Lough Swilly in county Donegal, to defend the north west of Ireland. It was part of a scheme to fortify Lough Swilly and Lough Foyle against French Invasion during the Revolutionary and Napoleonic Wars. It is situated on Ned's Point, near the once important naval town of Buncrana, and its current form largely dates to works completed between 1812 and 1813. It comprised a rectangular blockhouse mounting two guns and a supporting battery mounting four guns. The fort is surrounded by a ditch.

After the end of the Napoleonic Wars the defences were neglected and not updated. In 1874, the fort was armed with two 5.5-inch Howitzers in the tower and four 24 Pounder smooth bore guns in the main battery.

It was remodeled in the 1890s as a battery with two 6-inch guns on hydropneumatic mountings. This included a central underground magazine complex and the height of the tower or blockhouse was also reduced. In addition two practice batteries were constructed for six 64 Pounder guns and four 5-inch Breech Loading (BL) guns. In 1905 it was recommended by the Owen Committee that the fort be disarmed. This was completed by 1907, and no armament was listed at the fort in a report dated to 1913.

The fort remains substantially intact, along with the practice batteries. Parts of the site were restored by Buncrana Town Council in the 1990s, and subject to some additional restoration as of 2012. While there are a number of walking routes in the area, the fort itself is not open to the public.
