= Knockalla Fort =

Fort defending Lough Swilly, Donegal, Ireland

- County Donegal; Ireland
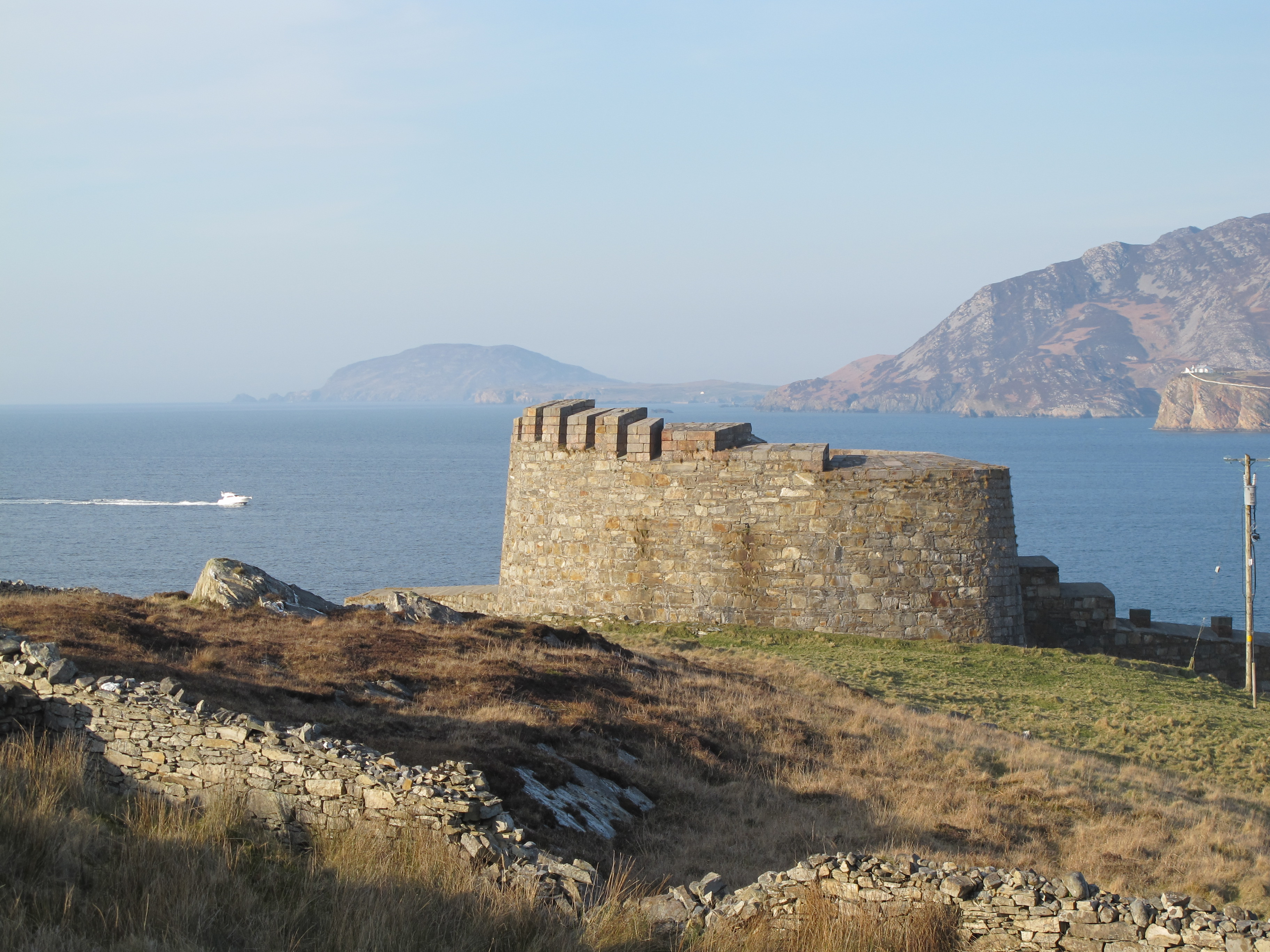
- Battery tower

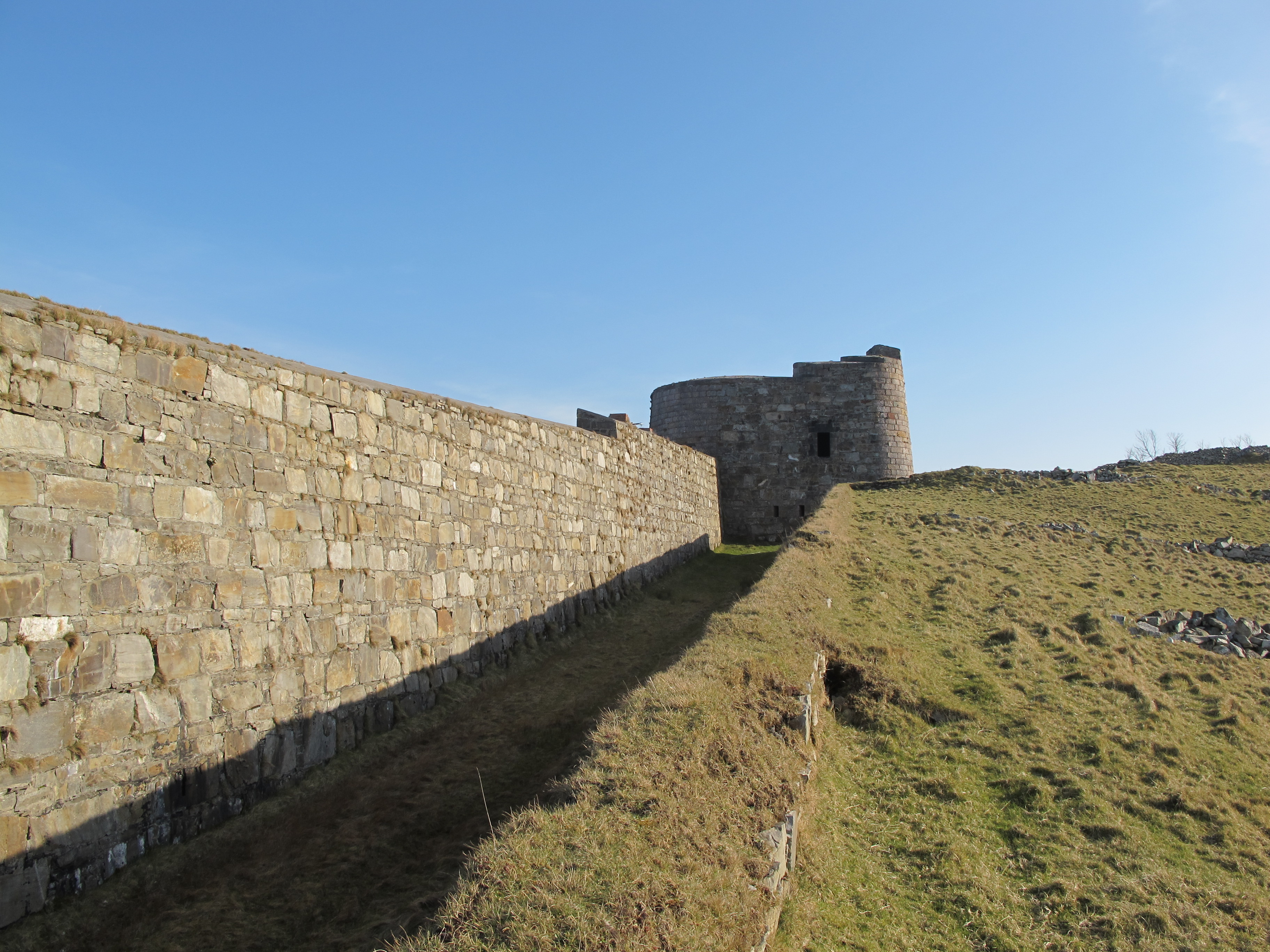
- Wall and moat

Site information
- Owner: Privately owned
- Open to the public: No access
- Condition: Intact

Location
- Coordinates: 55.1802°N 7.5739°W

Site history
- Built: 1812-1813
- Materials: Stone

Garrison information
- Garrison: British Armed Forces

Knockalla Fort is one of several Napoleonic batteries built along the shores of Lough Swilly in county Donegal, to defend the north west of Ireland. It was part of a scheme to fortify Lough Swilly and Lough Foyle against French Invasion during the Revolutionary and Napoleonic Wars and was completed between 1812 and 1813. On the other side of the Lough is Fort Dunree. The fort was built on the site of a temporary fortification first built in 1798.

It is triangular in shape with a tower on the landward salient angle. From the tower, the two walls of the fort, protected by a dry moat partly cut into the rock, lead down to the edge of steep rocky cliffs, where there are batteries on two levels. The lower battery with seven gun emplacements, originally mounted French 42 Pounder smooth bore guns on traversing platforms. The upper level contains barrack accommodation, magazine, casemates, entrance gateway and an upper battery for two 24 Pounder smooth bore guns on the northern flank of this level. The tower is quadrant-shaped in plan with corners rounded off and was armed with a 24 Pounder gun and a 5.5-inch howitzer.

After the end of the Napoleonic Wars the defences were neglected and not updated. By the 1860s the Fort was armed with an 18 Pounder gun and 5.5-inch howitzer in the tower. The upper battery had a 24 pounder gun. By this time the Fort was obsolete and was disarmed and abandoned by the military in the 1870s.

The fort remains substantially intact, and is now in use as a private residence.

== See also ==
- Martello tower

== Publications ==
- Paul M. Kerrigan (1995). Castles and fortifications in Ireland, 1485–1945. Collins Press. ISBN 1898256128.
- Col K W Maurice-Jones, 1959. The History of Coast Artillery in the British Army, Royal Artillery Institution, London
