= Lough Swilly =

Sea inlet in County Donegal, Ireland

- Loch Súilí (Irish)
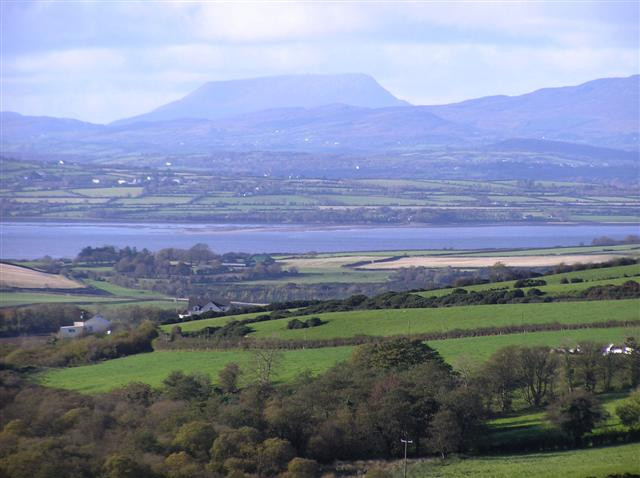

- Location in Ireland
- Location: County Donegal, Ireland
- Coordinates: 55.138°N 7.499°W
- Primary inflows: River Swilly
- Settlements: Inishowen

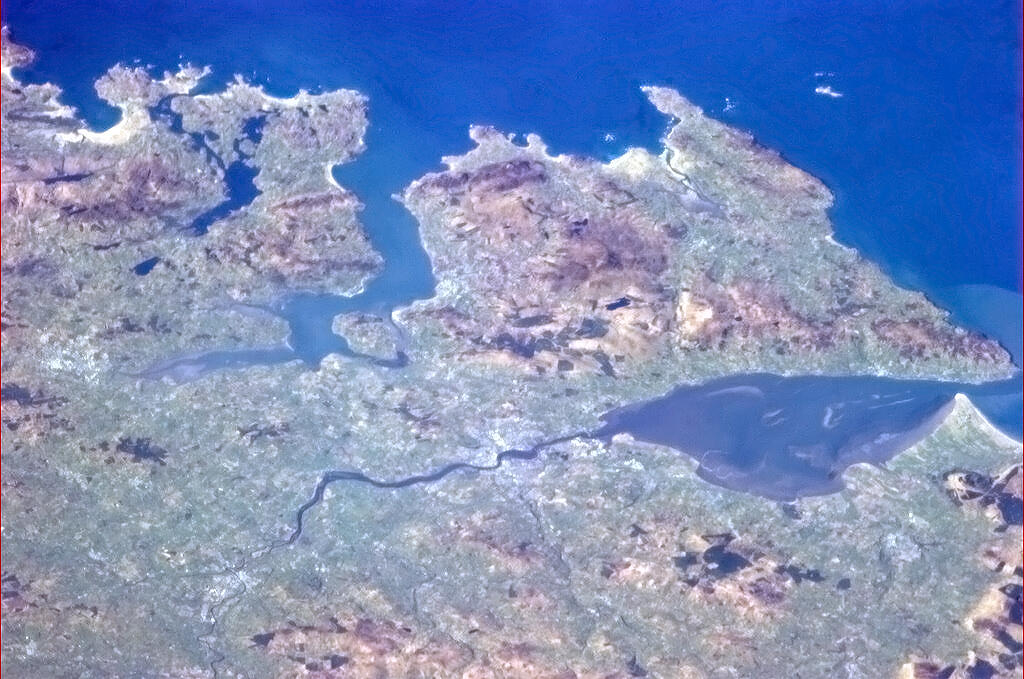
View from the International Space Station: Derry and the Ulster coastline, with Lough Swilly to the west and Lough Foyle and Inishowen to the north of the city

Lough Swilly (Irish: Loch Súilí, meaning 'lake of eyes') in Ireland is a glacial fjord or sea inlet lying between the western side of the Inishowen Peninsula and the Fanad Peninsula, in County Donegal. Along with Carlingford Lough and Killary Harbour it is one of three glacial fjords in Ireland.

== Name ==
Both Lough Swilly (Irish: Loch Súilí) and the adjoining River Swilly (An tSúileach) have the same derivation, and are sometimes associated with a legendary multi-eyed sea monster, Suileach, that was reputedly killed by Saint Colmcille (521–597). In The Origin and History of Irish Names of Places (1900), the historian Patrick Weston Joyce writes that súil may refer to whirlpools or to eyes and that suileach means "abounding in eyes or whirlpools".

== Geography and ecology ==
Located on the Fanad Peninsula, in County Donegal, the northern extremities of the lough are marked by Fanad Head with its lighthouse and Dunaff Head. Towns situated on the lough include Buncrana on Inishowen and Rathmullan on the western side. At the southern end of the lough lies Letterkenny.

In the south of the lough, a number of islands (Burt, Inch, Coney, Big Isle) were poldered and the land reclaimed during the 19th century for agriculture. The Londonderry and Lough Swilly Railway constructed embankments on the line from Derry to Letterkenny. These reclaimed lands are now wetlands associated with wildlife conservation and birdwatching, and support over 4,000 whooper swans and thousands of Greenland white front, barnacle, greylag and brent geese.

The lough is known for its wildlife-watching (dolphins, porpoise, seabirds, migratory geese and swans) and diving on a number of ship wrecks, including SS Laurentic sunk by a German mine (possible torpedo), which went down with 3,211 ingots of gold of which 3,191 were recovered.

== History ==
=== Prehistoric and ancient history ===
Lough Swilly has a number of early Stone Age monuments and Iron Age fortifications along its shores, as well as a number of shell middens dated to approximately 7000 BC.

The lough, and the Grianán Ailigh hill fort (early fortification and palace dating from 2000 to 5000 BC) at its southeastern bend, were recorded on Ptolemy's map of the world.

=== The flight of the earls ===
Swilly was the departure point for the 'Flight of the Earls' in 1607. This event, which followed a failed uprising in September 1607, saw Hugh O'Neill, 2nd Earl of Tyrone, and Rory O'Donnell, 1st Earl of Tyrconnell (the last Gaelic chieftains in Ireland at that time), set sail from Rathmullan with ninety of their followers.

=== Napoleonic and Victorian era ===
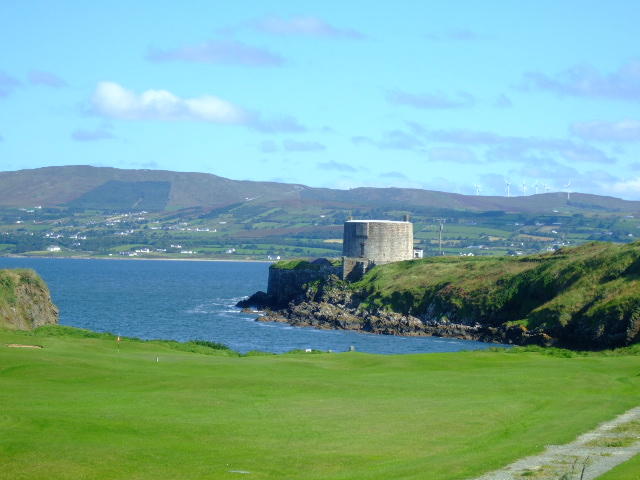
A Martello tower that sits on the banks of Lough Swilly.

Due to its natural shelter and its depth, the lough was an important naval port. In October 1798, immediately prior to the outbreak of the Napoleonic Wars, a French fleet carrying Wolfe Tone of the United Irishmen, plus troops to assist in 1798 rebellion, was intercepted and defeated in a naval battle at the entrance to Lough Swilly. Subsequently, Tone was captured and taken ashore at Buncrana on the east side of the Swilly.

A subsequent reassessment of the threat of invasion led to the building of a series of fortifications guarding the different approaches and landing points within the lough which were completed between 1800 and 1820. Martello towers were built around 1804 to defend the approaches to Derry. The six on the lough cost €1,800 each, were armed with smoothbore cannon, firing round shot and were completed in six months.

During a gale on 4 December 1811, the Royal Navy 36-gun Apollo-class frigate HMS Saldanha was shipwrecked in Lough Swilly. There were no survivors out of the estimated 253 aboard, with approximately 200 bodies washed up on shore.

=== First World War naval base ===
Immediately prior to World War I the War Office improved the Napoleonic forts and their armaments as well as adding another fort at the entrance to the lough at Lenan Head with 9-inch (23 cm) guns (12-mile range) – the largest in Ireland at the time. The remains of these fortifications are still at Lenan Head Fort, Fort Dunree (now a military and wildlife museum), Ned's Point, Buncrana, Inch Fort and on the west coast at Rathmullan, Knockalla and Macamish Point.

During the war, the lough was used by the Royal Navy as an anchorage for elements of the Grand Fleet, an amalgamation of the pre-war Home and Atlantic Fleets, under Admiral Sir John R. Jellicoe and a gathering/staging point for Atlantic convoys. During this period a boom was placed across the lough between Macamish Point and Ned's Point, supported by a number of trawlers, to prevent U-boat attacks.

=== Treaty port and World War Two neutrality ===
After the Irish War of Independence the lough was one of the Treaty Ports specified in the Anglo-Irish Treaty until its final handing over at Fort Dunree in 1938. According to exhibits at Fort Dunree, during World War II Irish troops operated the guns there with explicit instructions to fire at any ship that might threaten Irish neutrality by entering the natural harbour. On one occasion in this period, a Royal Navy ship entered the lough and – while it did not initially respond to signals that it should turn back – left the area without any action being taken.

=== Transport ===
The trains of the Londonderry and Lough Swilly Railway served the area around Lough Swilly until 1953, when the company's trains were replaced by buses. These operated until 2014, when the company was closed down and liquidated.

== See also ==
- List of loughs in Ireland
- Londonderry and Lough Swilly Railway
