= Inch Fort =

Fort defending Lough Swilly, Donegal, Ireland

- County Donegal; Ireland
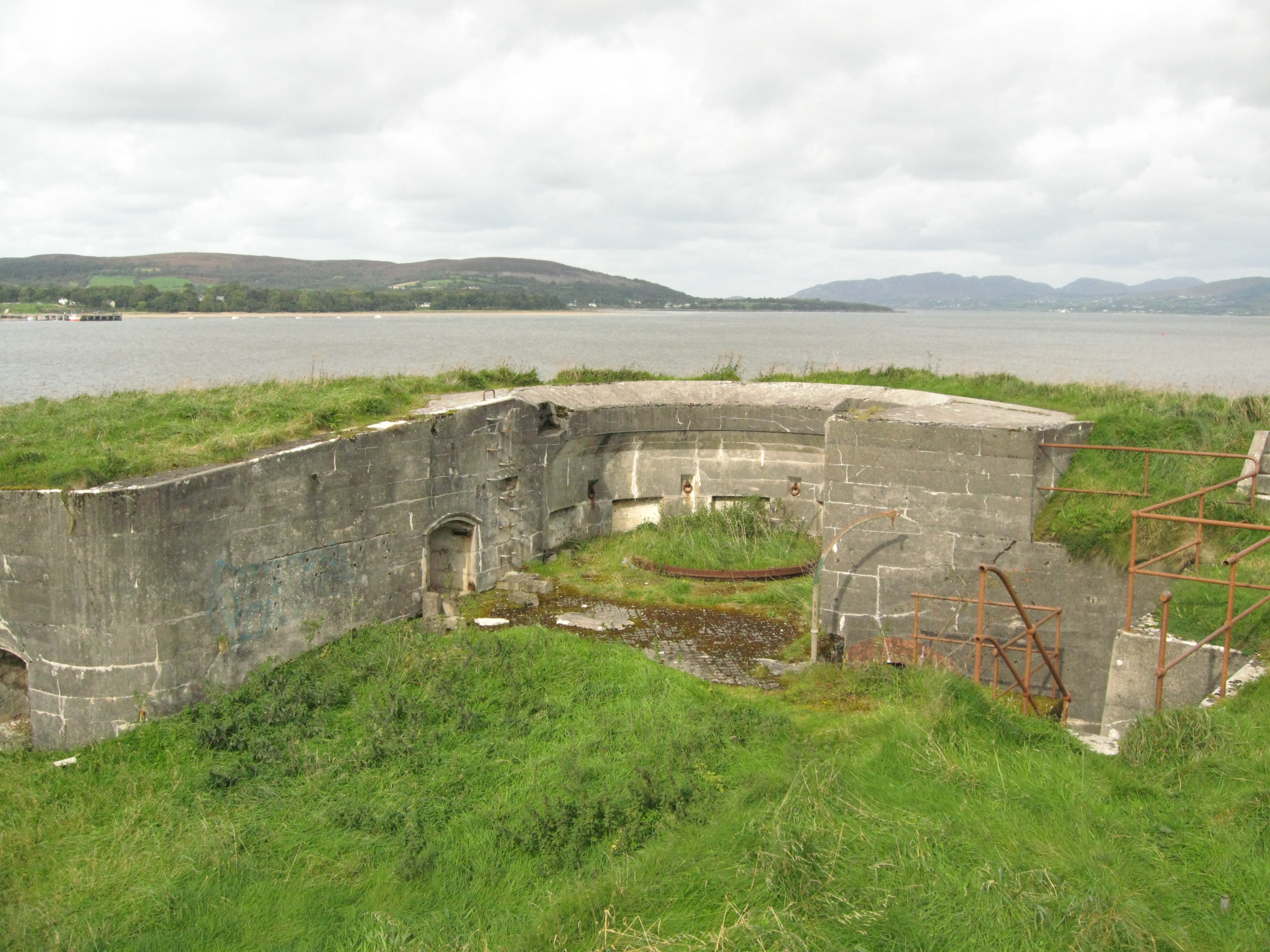
- Gun emplacement overlooking Lough Swilly

Site information
- Open to the public: No
- Condition: Intact, part demolished

Location
- Coordinates: 55.0842°N 7.5153°W

Site history
- Built: 1812-1813; Reconstructed 1895-1899
- Materials: Stone; Concrete; Earth

Garrison information
- Garrison: British Armed Forces

Inch Fort, Lough Swilly, Inishowen, County Donegal was built between 1812 and 1813, during the Napoleonic Wars. It had positions for nine guns, six in an open battery and a further three in a blockhouse. Following the peace in 1815, the defences of Lough Swilly were neglected.

During the 1880s a scheme to strengthen the defences in Lough Swilly was put into effect. By 1893 Inch Fort had been rearmed with two 6-inch guns on hydropneumatic carriages. A small barrack complex was added at the same time. Following recommendations of the Owen Committee in 1905, the guns were deemed surplus and the fort was disarmed and abandoned.

Today the site includes the two 6-inch gun positions and associated magazines, but the Napoleonic blockhouse was mostly demolished during the 1890s remodelling.
