= 1360s =

Decade

The 1360s was a decade of the Julian Calendar which began on January 1, 1360, and ended on December 31, 1369.

== Events ==
=== January–March ===
- January 11 – Reims campaign: The Army of France, led by the regent Charles, breaks the Kingdom of England's siege of Reims, then leads the worn-out soldiers into the Duchy of Burgundy to recuperate at Tonnerre.
- January 18 – In Italy, Guido Gonzaga becomes the new Capitano del popolo (Captain of the People) and leader of the city-state of Mantua upon the death of his father, Ludovico I Gonzaga.
- January – The Goryeo Army of Korea launches a counterattack against the invasion by China's Red Turbans, and recaptures Seogyeong only 20 days after it had been lost.
- February 19 – The French Army relocates to Guillen on the borders of Burgundy and remains for a month.
- February 28 – Qulpa of Borjigin, Khan of the Golden Horde, is assassinated after a reign of only six months that followed the murder of his brother, Berdi Beg.
- March 10 – Reims campaign: Philip of Rouvres, Duke of Burgundy, reaches an agreement with King Edward III of England and Edward the Black Prince to avoid an invasion of the Duchy in return for the payment of 200,000 gold moutons.

=== April–June ===
- April 3 – King Edward III summons the English Parliament to assemble at Westminster on May 15.
- April 5 – King Peter I of Cyprus is crowned as King of Jerusalem at a ceremony at Saint Nicholas Cathedral at Famagusta in Cyprus. Although King Peter will never visit Jerusalem, and Palestine has been under Muslim control since 1291, the Kings of Cyprus have continued to claim the title for 70 years.
- April 6 – Reims campaign: King Edward III and the English troops withdraw from Saint-Germain-lès-Arpajon and march toward the English-ruled territory of Brittany, intending to refresh and to make another attempt to attack Paris later in the year. They stop at the gates of Chartres, hoping to provoke the Dauphin of France, Charles, into leading his outnumbered party into battle.
- April 13 – Reims campaign: On what is later called "Black Monday", a freak hail storm strikes at Chartres, where the English are leading a siege. The unsheltered English troops are caught in a severe thunderstorm, accompanied by a drop in the temperature and huge hailstones began falling from the sky, killing more than 1,000 of the 10,000 English troops and 6,000 horses in half an hour. King Edward concludes that the strom is a sign from God to halt the Reims campaign and to drop all claims to the French throne.
- April 14 – The day after the Black Monday hailstorm, French emissary Androin de la Roche, the Abbot of Clurry, arrives at the English camp and proposes a peace agreement to end the war between England and France. King Edward begins the withdrawal of his army from the gates of Chartres.
- April 18 – Jayarjunadeva is proclaimed as the ceremonial King of Nepal, though his actual assumption of office waits until the death of his father, Jayarajadeva, in 1361.
- May 8 – The Treaty of Brétigny is drafted by the Dauphin Charles of France and six English knights at the Hôtel de Sens, the Dauphin's residence, in Paris to set terms for the end of the ongoing war between the kingdoms of England and France.
- May 15 – The English Parliament opens at Westminster, but history does not record when it adjourned and what, if any legislation it enacted.
- June 7 – (8th waning of Nayon, 722 ME) In what is now Myanmar, the coronation of King Narathu the Pinya kingdom in the Mandalay Region of Myanmar. Narathu has reigned since March 19, 1359 after the death of his father, Kyawswa II.
- June 14 – King Jean II of France, who has been held as a prisoner of war in England since 1356, signs the Treaty of Brétigny at a banquet attended by England's King Edward III, Edward, Prince of Wales, and other French prisoners of war. Under the treaty, King Edward obtains 19 territories on the French mainland in return for renouncing any claims to the French throne, while King Jean obligates France to pay a ransom of 3,000,000 gold écu coins for the release of himself and the other French prisoners, with the condition that he will be allowed to return to France after the first one million écus is paid and send two of his sons to England as hostages, along with more than 40 French citizens.
- June 22 – Russian prince Dmitry Konstantinovich is installed by the Khan of the Golden Horde as the new Grand Prince of Vladimir.
- June 30 – King Jean II of France is released from the Tower of London after having been taken as a prisoner of war since 1356, and is feted with a farewell dinner at Eltham Palace, hosted by Queen consort Philippa, then begins his journey back to France.
- June –
  - Khiḍr Khan is enthroned as the Khan of the Golden Horde
  - Valdemar IV Atterdag attacks Skåne and conquers Lindholmen Castle.

=== July–September ===
- July 8 – King Jean II of France returns to the continent after four years as a prisoner of war in England, landing at Calais, in order to raise the 3,000,000 gold crown ransom owed to England under the terms of the Treaty of Brétigny. To take his place, Jean's son Louis I of Anjou boards the English ship to be held as a hostage in England.
- July 13 – (27 Shaban 761 AH) Sultan Ismail II of Granada is assassinated, less than a year after he ascended the throne on August 23, 1359. He is succeeded by Muhammad VI of the Nasrid dynasty.
- August 10 – Peace is concluded between Sweden and Denmark with the arbitration in Helsingborg. Magnus IV Eriksson cedes the Scanian lands except northern Halland to Denmark. In return, Valdemar IV Atterdag must help Magnus against his domestic enemies.
- September 26 – Philip of Rouvres, Duke of Burgundy, becomes the Count of Auvergne upon the death of his mother, the Queen consort Joan I of Auvergne.

=== October–December ===
- October 24 – The Treaty of Brétigny is ratified at Calais, marking the end of the first phase of the Hundred Years' War. Under its terms, Edward III of England gives up his claim to the French throne, and releases King John II of France in return for French land, including Calais and Gascony.
- November 20 – King Edward III summons the English Parliament, directing the members of the Lords and Commons to assemble at Westminster on January 24.
- December 5 – The French franc, worth one livre tournois and consisting of 3.73 grams of gold, is minted for the first time as the franc à cheval after King Jean of France returns from captivity, and is designed initially to paid the ransom of three million gold crowns owed by France to England. The franc will as France's monetary unit for the next 638 years until it is phased out in favor of the euro by the European Community on December 31, 1998.

=== Date unknown ===
- Red Turban Rebellions: Chen Youliang murders Xu Shouhui and proclaims himself the emperor of Han in Wuchang before unsuccessfully attempting to capture Nanjing from Zhu Yuanzhang.
- Shah Shuja regains rule of the Muzaffarid tribe in Persia after the death of his brother, Shah Mahmud.
- Earliest known Kırkpınar oil wrestling tournament in the Ottoman Empire, which will still be staged into the 21st century.

=== January–March ===
- January 24 – The English Parliament is opened at Westminster by King Edward III for a 25-day session.
- February 16 – In what is now Spain, the Muslim Sultan Muhammad VI of Granada concludes a six-year treaty of alliance with the Christian King Pedro IV of Aragon.
- February 18 – The English Parliament closes after a 25-day session. Among the acts passed and given royal assent are the Justices of the Peace Act 1361, defining, for the first time, the duties and powers of a justice of the peace and setting for the qualifications required. as well as acts governing weights and measres, the limitation of purveyances to "the King, the Queen and the King's eldest son", several acts for punishment of labourers and servants for "departing from their service into another county," and directing that if they "If a labourer or servant do flee to a city or borough, do flee to a city or borough, the chief officer upon request shall deliver him up."
- March 17 – An-Nasir Hasan, Mamluk Sultan of Egypt, is killed by one of his own mamluks, Yalbugha al-Umari, who, with the senior Mamluk emirs, has al-Mansur Muhammad installed as the new sultan.

=== April–June ===
- April 13 – The University of Pavia is founded, on the Italian Peninsula.
- May 1 – King Magnus Eriksson of Sweden and Norway sends a letter to the citizens of Visby, with a warning of an upcoming Danish invasion.
- May 18 – With the mediation of Cardinal Guy of Boulogne, the legate of Pope Innocent VI, the Peace of Terrer is agreed upon in Spain by representatives of King Pedro of Castile and King Pedro IV of Aragon to end the War of the Two Pedros between Castile and Aragon. Boulogne returns to Avignon on November 8, but the treaty he negotiated is not ratified by either kingdom.
- June 24 – Thirteen years after the Black Death disease came to England, a two-day spike in deaths occurs in London with 1,200 people dying from the bubonic plague on June 24 and June 25.
- June – Ahi Ayna, monarch of the Emirate of Erzincan in what is now eastern Turkey leads an expedition of conquest into the Kingdom of Georgia, capturing Akhaltsikhe, Samstskhe, and Atsquri, taking 12,000 people captive and collecting the jizya, a special tax on non-Muslims.

=== July–September ===
- July 27 – Battle of Visby: King Valdemar IV of Denmark conquers the city of Visby by defeating the defending Gutnish country yeomen, killing 1,200 of their number, and takes Gotland. To avert being sacked and looted, the leaders of Visby pay a large ransom to King Valdemar, which is collected in payments by sheriffs sent regularly to the city for tribute.
- August 3 – (24th day of 6th month of Shōhei 16) The Shōhei earthquake, estimated centuries later as being at least 8.4 magnitude, strikes off of the eastern coast of Japan and causes a tsunami which sweeps 1,700 houses and their thousands of inhabitants around Yukinominato Bay out to sea.
- August 6 – The Emir Ahi Ayna guides his army into the Empire of Trebizond and besieges the cities of Lazica, Golacha and Koukos.
- August 23 – King Peter I of Cyprus lands 10 ships at Antalya in what is now Turkey and, after a one-day siege, conquers the city
- September 22 – King Peter and his fleet arrive back in Cyprus after bringing back spoils of war and tributes from various regions of Asia Minor.

=== October–December ===
- October 10 – Edward the Black Prince marries Joan of Kent at Windsor Castle.
- October – A force of 200,000 soldiers of the Red Turbans of Yuan dynasty China, unable to retreat to China's Heibei region, cross the Yalu River and invade northern Korea, ruled by the kingdom of Goryeo. Led by Pan Cheng, Sha Liu, Guan Xiansheng, and Zhu Yuanshu, they capture Sakju and Iseong, and then assemble at Muju (now Yeongbyeon by early November.
- November 11 – China's Red Turbans break through the Korean defense line at Jeoryeong, and King Gongmin of Goryeo is forced to evacuate his capital at Gaegyeong (now Kaesong, North Korea) and to flee to Bokju (now Andong, North Gyeongsang Province, South Korea).
- November 21 – Philip of Rouvres, the 15-year old Duke of Burgundy, dies from the plague has no heirs, bringing an end to rule by the House of Capet and leaving the Duchy open to conquest by King Jean II of France.
- November 24 – China's Red Turbans, already occupying much of the Goryeo Kingdom (now North Korea), invade the capital city of Gaegyeong and burn down the royal palace.
- December 21 – The Battle of Linuesa is fought between invaders from the Emirate of Granada and defenders from the Kingdom of Castile at the city of Huesa in Castile's autonomous Kingdom of Jaén (now the Jaén Province of Spain). The Castilian Army, led by the Christian Diego García de Padilla, is able to defeat the Muslim troops of Granada. Most of the 600 Granadan troops are slaughtered before they can retreat.
- December 28 – King Jean II of France, nicknamed "John the Good" in English accounts, invades and takes control of the Duchy of Burgundy. He chooses to keep the Duchy as a separate state with himself as Duke, rather than to annex it to the Kingdom of France.

=== Date unknown ===
- Buda became the capital of the Kingdom of Hungary.
- In the Marinid Empire in modern-day Morocco, Abu Salim Ibrahim is overthrown by Abu Umar, who is in turn overthrown by Abu Zayyan.
- Great Troubles: the Blue Horde descends into anarchy. Between 1361 and 1378, over 20 khans succeed each other in different parts of the Blue Horde's territory.
- Ottoman Emirate conquered Didymoteicho
- Chinese rebels capture the Goryeo capital.
- The earliest known musical keyboard instrument is built, with the layout of black and white keys that becomes standard.

=== January–March ===
- January 1 – The Grand Duchy of Lithuania switches New Year to January 1, before any other country does.
- January 16 – The "Grote Mandrenke" storm tide kills more than 25,000 people after striking the Netherlands, England, Germany and Denmark on the feast day of Saint Marcellus, and destroying the Danish settlement of Rungholt in the Duchy of Schleswig, and the Humber estuary port of Ravenser Odd in England. The East Frisian island of Buise is broken into two islands by North Sea floods.
- February 7 – General Hu Dahai, the chief military adviser to the Chinese warlord Zhu Yuanzhang, the future Emperor of China and the ruler of most of the Anhui and Jiangsu provinces, is assassinated by General Jiang Ying after being lured to the city of Jinhua in the Zhejiang on the pretext of reviewing the troops. Distracting Hu, Jiang kills him with an iron hammer, as well as killing two other visitors, Hu Guanzhu and Geng Zaicheng.
- February 15 – King Haakon VI of Norway, son of King Magnus Eriksson of Sweden, proclaims himself king of Sweden in opposition to his father. However, later in the year, father and son are reconciled and rule Sweden together.
- March 13 – Sultan Muhammad V of Granada, returns to the throne after the usurper Muhammed VI flees the Alhambra and seeks asylum from King Pedro I of Castile.
- March 20 – Simon Sudbury is consecrated as the Bishop of London, serving in the office until becoming the Archbishop of Canterbury in 1375.
- March –
  - Murad I succeeds his father Orhan as sultan of the Ottoman Empire.
  - The nation of Champa (now in southern Vietnam), ruled by King Po Binasuor, raids the Hóa Châu prefecture of Đại Việt (now in northern Vietnam), then withdraws.

=== April–June ===
- April 6
  - Battle of Brignais: The Free Companies defeat a French army.
  - A fire destroys much of St Patrick's Cathedral in Dublin.
- April 17 – Kaunas Castle in Lithuania falls to the Teutonic Order, after a month-long siege.
- April 25 – After the former Sultan Muhammad VI of Granada arrives in the Crown of Castile, King Pedro I not only denies him asylum, but has him executed.
- May 1 – Ulrich IV, co-ruler with his brother Eberhard II as Count of Württemberg in Germany, is forced by the Holy Roman Emperor Charles IV to resign after his insistence that Württemberg be divided between the two counts. As compensation, Ulrich receives Hohenneuffen Castle and several towns and castles.
- May 26 – Giovanna I di Napoli becomes the sole ruler of the Kingdom of Naples after the death, from bubonic plague, of her husband, King Ludovico di Napoli, with whom she had allowed the sharing of power since their marriage in 1347.
- June 8 – Pir Husayn, ruler of Karahisar, invades the Emirate of Erzincan to confront the Emir Ahi Ayna.
- June 22 – An alliance is formed between the Kingdom of England and the Crown of Castile.
- June – Under the terms of the will of Sir John de Wingfield (died 1361), the church of St. Andrew and a college of priests are founded in Wingfield, Suffolk, England.

=== July–September ===
- July 3 – Ahi Ayna, the Emir of Erzincan and conqueror of much of eastern Turkey, the Kingdom of Georgia and the Kingdom of Trebizond and reportedly dies as a martyr after Pir Husayn's invasion of the emirate.
- July 8 – Valdemar IV of Denmark defeats the Hanseatic League in the naval Battle of Helsingborg.
- July 10 – Pir Husayn becomes the new Emir of Erzincan.
- August 14 – King Edward III summons the English Parliament members to assemble at Westminster on October 13.
- August 22 – In what is now Croatia, peace is concluded at Onogoste (now Nikšić in Montenegro) between he Republic of Ragusa and Prince Vojislav Vojinović of the Republic of Dubrovnik.
- September 7 – Joan, Queen of Scots, the Queen consort of Scotland, wife of King David II and sister of King Edward III of England, dies at Hertfordshire in England at the age of 41 after having been separated from David for many years.
- September 22 – A papal concave begins at the Palais des Papes in Avignon as 20 of the Roman Catholic cardinals meet to elect a successor to Pope Innocent VI, who had died on September 12.

=== October–December ===
- October 13 – The English Parliament is opened for the first time with a speech in English, as delivered by the Lord Chancellor, after having been opened for centuries with a speech in Latin. Under Edward III, the Pleading in English Act makes English rather than Law French the official language in English law courts. Sir Henry Green, Chief Justice of the King's Speech, is elected as the Speaker of the House of Lords.
- October 28 – Guillaume de Grimoard, the apostolic legate to the Kingdom of Naples, is selected in absentia as the new Pope of the Roman Catholic Church after 30 days of disagreements in Avignon on a successor, in that none of the proposed candidates receives the require two-thirds (14 of 20) necessary votes. Rather than informing Grimoard of his election, the cardinals send a message to Florence, stating that they wish to consult with him at Avignon, in that Grimoard (who wishes to keep the papacy at Avignon rather than returning it to Rome) might be detained by authorities in Italy. Grimoard reaches Avignon after nine days of travel from Florence, and takes the papal name of Pope Urban V.
- October 30 – The English Parliament ends its session after 17 days, and royal assent is given by King Edward III to laws passed therein, including the Purveyance Acts 1363, limiting government purchases to the King and Queen (or authorized representatives), and penalties for purveyors who violate the law, as well as the Parliament Act 1363 ("A parliament shall be holden once in the year.")
- November 6 – Pope Urban V is crowned after his arrival in Avignon and his consecration as a bishop of the Roman Catholic Church, after having been elected on October 28.
- November 13 – Lionel of Antwerp, the second son of King Edward III of England, is created Duke of Clarence. and John of Gaunt, King Edward's third son, is created Duke of Lancaster
- December 5 – The Battle of Launac is fought in France between Jean II, Count of Armagnac and Gaston III Febus, Count of Foix. Not only does Febus triumph in battle, supported by a archers for Foix who fire a volley of arrows into the Armagnac cavalry, Count Jean II and most of the Armagnac leaders are captured as prisoners of war and held for a total ransom of 600,000 gold florins, each with 3.5g of pure gold, equal to 2,100 kilograms (more than 74,000 ounces) of gold. Of this, 300,000 florins are paid for the release of Count Jean.
- December 21 – Constantine IV succeeds his cousin, Constantine III, as King of Armenia.

=== Date unknown ===
- Autumn 1362 or 1363 – Battle of Blue Waters: Grand Duke of Lithuania Algirdas defeats the Tatars, and takes over Kyiv.
- Red Turban Rebellions: Hu Dahai, aide to Zhu Yuanzhang, is killed by Miao chieftains in Yanzhou (part of modern-day Jinhua and Hangzhou). Chaghan Temur is killed and succeeded by his nephew Köke Temür.
- The Öræfajökull volcano erupts in Iceland, resulting in the destruction of the district of Litlahérað by flood and tephra fall.
- The English Hospice of the Most Holy Trinity and St Thomas is founded in Rome. It goes on to become the English College, a centre for training English priests in Rome.

=== January–March ===
- January 4 – The Lombardy towns of Magenta and Corbetta are captured from the control of Galeazzo Visconti by British mercenaries hired by the Marquis of Monferrato, Guglielmo VII Aleramici.
- February 21 – Simon Langham is appointed by King Edward III as the new Lord Chancellor of England after the retirement of the Chancellor William Edington.
- March 14 – Gabriele Adorno is elected as the new Doge of the Republic of Genoa following the sudden death of the Doge Simone Boccanegra.

=== April–June ===
- April 9 – King Haakon VI of Norway marries Princess Margrethe of Estridsen, the daughter of King Valdemar IV of Denmark in a ceremony at the Copenhagen Cathedral. Margrethe will become Queen of Denmark in 1387 after Haakon's death.
- May 7 – (12 Pashons 1080 AM) In Egypt, the bishop Youhanna of Damascus is elected as the new Pope of the Coptic Orthodox Christians and takes the regnal name of Pope John X of Alexandria. He serves until his death on July 13, 1369.
- May 8 – Charles IV, Holy Roman Emperor and his former son-in-law, King Lajos of Hungary meet at Uherské Hradiště (now in the Czech Republic) to conclude a peace agreement to avoid a battle over control of Bohemia.
- May 29 – Al-Ashraf Sha'ban is installed as the Sultan of Egypt at the age after the Emir Yalbugha al-Umari leads a coup d'état against the Sultan Al-Mansur Muhammad, who had reigned for two years.
- June 1 – King Edward III of England summons the English Parliament, directing the members to assemble at Westminster on October 6.
- June 15 – at the age of 2, Prince Wenceslaus of Luxembourg, the son of Charles IV, Holy Roman Emperor, is crowned at St. Vitus Cathedral in Prague as Vaclav IV, King of Bohemia, the position formerly held by his father. The Archbishop of Prague, Arnošt of Pardubice, places the crown on the head of the child, despite his protest that crowning an infant is a mockery of the coronation ceremony.
- June 29 – Edward, the Black Prince, son of King Edward III of England and heir to the English throne, arrives in Bordeaux to become the new administrator of the Duchy of Aquitaine, a principality that had been ceded by France to England under the Treaty of Bretigny.

=== July–September ===
- July 1 – Louis, Duke of Anjou, the son of the French King John the Good, arrives in France after having been held a hostage in London since 1360 in exchange for King John's release from captivity as a prisoner of war. The escape leads to a crisis that ends with King John's voluntary return to imprisonment in England six months later.
- July 2 – An envoy of Pope Urban V, Jean de la Grange, arranges the signing of the Peace of Morvedre (now Sagunto in Spain) to end the "War of the Two Pedros between King Pedro of Castile (aided by England and other nations) and King Pedro IV of Aragon (aided by France), but neither side attempts to ratify the accords. Fighting continues until 1369 when Pedro of Castile is overthrown and replaced by Enrique de Trastámara.
- July 8 – King Lajos I of Hungary leads an attack on Sokograd in Bosnia and begins a three-day siege that is defended by Vukac Hrvatinić, whose son Hrvoje Vukčić Hrvatinić will later become the Grand Duke of Bosnia. The Bosnian defense saves the city and King Lajos is forced to retreat with his troops back to Hungary after three days.
- August 8 – The Revolt of Saint Titus, against the rule of the Republic of Venice in the Kingdom of Candia (island of Crete), begins.
- August 15 – The Army of China's rebel leader Zhu Wenzheng marches from Nanjing with 100,000 troops toward the Han State to confront Zhang Shicheng.
- August 30– The Battle of Lake Poyang, one of the largest naval battles in history begins in Yuan dynasty China between multiple ships and 650,000 rebels led by Chen Youliang, against a smaller force of 200,000 troops led by the Red Turban Rebel Zhu Yuanzhang and continues for five weeks.
- September 6 – Philip the Bold (Philippe II le Hardi), son of King John the Good (Jean le Bon) is secretly designated as the new Duke of Burgundy by the King after the death of the previous Duke, Philip of Rouvres. Previously, Guillaume IV de Melun, Count of Tancarville, had been administrator of Burgundy since the death in 1361 of the prior Duke, Philip of Rouvres, until King John had become dissatisfied with him.

=== October–December ===
- October 4 – The Battle of Lake Poyang ends as Zhu Yuanzhang and his Red Turban Rebels defeat the rebels led by Chen Youliang.
- October 6 – The English Parliament is opened at Westminster for a 24-day session.
- October 30 – King Edward III gives royal assent to laws passed by the Parliament as its session closes, including the Statute Concerning Diet and Apparel 1363, a sumptuary law limiting the style of clothing that people of different classes were allowed to wear, aimed at halting a trend by lower class and middle class to wear fashions similar to more wealthy English citizens, as well as requiring higher prices for "hen, capon, pullet and goose". The new law has 19 chapters setting the dress code for "handicraftsmen and yeomen" (c. 9), "gentlemen under the estate of knights" (c.10), merchants (c.11), knights with lands of a value of 200 marks and knights with lands of 400 marks (c.12), clerks (c.13), and ploughmen (c.14).
- November 26 – Pope Urban V selects Cardinal Androin de la Roche to replace Cardinal Gil Álvarez Carrillo de Albornoz as the papal negotiator to establish peace with the Lord of Milan, Bernabò Visconti.
- December 20 – John de Coupland, the ruthless Sheriff of Northumberland in England who had taken King David II of Scotland as a prisoner of war for 11 years following the 1346 Battle of Neville's Cross, is assassinated by a group of his enemies as he is trying to cross through Bolton le Moors in Lancashire. A contemporary account notes that later that "nine of the attackers wielded lances and eleven were archers," and that they all fled across the border to Scotland after the murder.

=== Date unknown ===
- Ottoman Turks seize Filibe (Philippopolis) in Thrace in the Byzantine–Ottoman wars.
- Dmitry Donskoy, Prince of the Grand Duchy of Moscow, dethrones Dmitry of Suzdal to become Grand Prince of Vladimir.
- Al-Afdal al-Abbas succeeds Al-Mujahid Ali as Rasulid Sultan of Yemen.
- The Mosque-Madrassa of Sultan Hassan is completed in Cairo, Egypt.

=== January–March ===
- January 3 – Jean II le Bon ("John the Good"), King of France, voluntarily returns to imprisonment in England to secure the payment of his remaining ransom under the Treaty of Brétigny and in order to free the other hostages who had taken his place upon his release in 1363. King Jean's incarceration takes place as house arrest at the Savoy Palace in London, where he resides until his death on April 8.
- February 4 – Zhu Yuanzhang, the Duke of Wu, proclaims himself as "King of Wu" after defeating the rebel Chen Youliang at the Battle of Lake Poyang. At the same time, the rebel Zhang Shicheng also claimed the same title in the lower Yangtze River region.
- February 15 – Joint kings Magnus Eriksson and Haakon Magnusson of Sweden are both deposed by noblemen, who instead elect Magnus's nephew Albrekt of Mecklenburg the new king of Sweden. Albrekt is crowned as King on February 18 at a ceremony at the Stones of Mora of Knivsta, near Uppsala.
- February 20 – David II of Scotland marries Margaret Drummond.
- March 3 – In Italy, peace is worked out between the Duchy of Mirandola and the anti-Milan league after the January 10 attack on the city of Mirandola.

=== April–June ===
- April 1 – Pope Urban V issues a series of seven papal bulls to fund the Savoyard Crusade to be led by Count Amadeus VI of Savoy against the Moslem Ottoman Turks who control the Holy Land in the area surrounding Jerusalem.
- April 8 – Charles V becomes King of France upon the death of his imprisoned father, Jean II, in England.
- May 12 – The Jagiellonian University is founded in Kraków.
- May 16 – The Battle of Cocherel is fought in France over the matter of claim to the French throne recently vacated by the April death of King John the Good. Less than 3,000 troops commanded by General Bertrand du Guesclin, on behalf of King John's son Charles of Valois defend against a larger force of more than 5,000 soldiers and 300 archers sent by a rival claimant, King Carlos II of Navarre and commanded by Jean III de Grailly, with the help of English troops led by John Jouel. Guesclin is able to deceive the Navarrese and English troops by retreating and then surrounding the enemy, and King Charles is formally crowned three days later.
- May 19 – The coronation of King Charles V of France takes place at the Reims Cathedral in Reims.
- June 2 – King Charles V of France issues a letters patent to recognize that the King's youngest son, Philip the Bold, as the rightful Duke of the autonomous Duchy of Burgundy. King John II, Philip's late grandfather, had been allowed Philip to serve as Duke since September 6.

=== July–September ===
- July 28 – Battle of Cascina: Forces of the Republic of Florence, led by Galeotto Malatesta, defeat those of the Republic of Pisa.
- August 6 – Ignatius Saba I becomes the Syriac Orthodox Patriarch of Tur Abdin.
- September 10 – Philip of Anjou becomes Titular Emperor of Constantinople and Prince of Taranto.
- September 29 – Battle of Auray: The Breton War of Succession ends, with the victory of the House of Montfort over Charles of Blois.

=== October–December ===
- October 8 – Philotheos Kokkinos is appointed by the Byantine Emperor John V Palaiologos to the position of the Ecumenical Patriarch of Constantinople for the second time in his life, as leader of the Eastern Orthodox Christians. He had previously been the Patriarch from 1353 to 1354.
- November 16 – Vladislav I (also known as Vlaicu-Vodă) becomes voivode of Wallachia.
- December 4 – King Edward III of England summons the English Parliament and directs the members of the House of Lords and the House of Commons to assemble at Westminster on January 20.

=== Date unknown ===
- Bogdana Monastery is built in Moldavia.
- Rana Kshetra Singh succeeds Rana Hamir Singh, as ruler of Mewar (part of modern-day western India).
- Anavema Reddy succeeds Anavota Reddy, as ruler of the Reddy Dynasty in Andhra Pradesh (part of modern-day southern India).
- The Kingdom of Ava is established by Thado Minbya in modern-day northern Burma. Some chronicles and sources however date the event in 1365.

=== January–March ===
- January 20 – The English Parliament assembles at Westminster to begin a four week session but adjourns on February 17 without any legislation of record having been enacted.
- February 20 – In Italy, Paolo Alboino della Scala, Lord of Verona, is arrested on orders of his brother Cansignorio della Scala, on charges of "conjuring" and imprisoned for the rest of his life, before being strangled to death in 1375.
- February 25 – (6th waxing of Tabaung The Burmese King Thado Minbya proclaims the founding of the Kingdom of Ava at what are now the ruins of Inwa near what is now Manadalay in Myanmar.
- March 3 – At the Battle of Gataskogen, King Albrekt of Sweden defeats and captures the former King, Magnus Eriksson, whom he had overthrown on February 18, 1364, confirming his entitlement to the Sweden.
- March 6 – The Treaty of Pamplona is signed by King Carlos II of Navarre and King Charles V of France to begin a truce between the two kingdoms.
- March 12 – The University of Vienna is founded by Rudolf IV, Duke of Austria, commemorated more than 650 years later as the oldest university in the German-speaking world.

=== April–June ===
- April 12 – The Treaty of Guérande is signed at Guérande between the English Duke John IV of Brittany and King Charles V of France, ending the War of the Breton Succession after 24 years.
- May 14 – The Council of Apt is held in France between the archbishops and bishops of Arles, Embrun and Aix-en-Provence and results in the publication of 28 decrees, including the granting of 11 days of indulgence to persons who visit "with pious sentiments", the Church of the Blessed Virgin at Apt on the feast of the Exaltation of the Holy Cross and venerate there certain relics of the Cross.
- May 17 – Otto of Wittelsbach becomes the sole Elector of Brandenburg in the Holy Roman Empire upon the death of his brother, Ludwig II.
- May 28 – Raymond Berengar becomes the new Grand Master of the Knights Hospitaller upon the death of the Grand Master Roger de Pins, who had led the island of Rhodes since 1355.
- June 2 – The Hungarian occupation of Vidin begins, with the capture of the city by the forces of King Lajos of Hungary and the capture of the Tsar Ivan Sratsimir of Bulgaria, as a prisoner of war.
- June 4 – At a coronation ceremony held at the Church of St. Trophime at Arles, Charles IV, Holy Roman Emperor, is crowned as the King of the two Burgundies.
- June 27 – King Peter II of Cyprus and Duke Amadeus of Savoy depart from Venice in 165 ships to begin the Alexandrian Crusade to attack Egypt.

=== July–September ===
- July 21 – Marco Cornaro is elected as the new Doge of the Republic of Venice, three days after the death of Lorenzo Celsi.
- July 27 – Albrecht III and Leopold III become the joint rulers of the Duchy of Austria and the lands of the Habsburg family upon the death of their older brother, Rudolf IV.
- August 16 – The warlord Bolad Temür, who has held control of the court of the Yuan dyanasty Chinese Emperor Huizong as father of the ailing Empress Consort Bayan Khutugh, is assassinated by Bayan Dar on orders of the Emperor.
- September 8 – Öljei Khutuk, the Korean born wife of the Emperor Huizong of Yuan dynasty China, becomes his primary consort upon the death of at age 42 Huizong's primary wife, the Empress consort Bayan Khutugh. In December, Öljei is proclaimed by Huizong as the Empress Gi.

=== October–December ===
- October 9 – Alexandrian Crusade: The city of Alexandria in the Mamluk Sultanate of Egypt is sacked by an allied force of King Peter I of Cyprus and the knights of the Order of St. John of Jerusalem after a three day siege. After the killing of more than 20,000 civilians and the capturing of 5,000 others to be sold into slavery, the knights abandon Alexandria.
- November 22 – The Peace of Vordingborg is signed between representatives of the Kingdom of Denmark and the Hanseatic League to temporarily end the Danish–Hanseatic War. The war will resume in 1367.
- November 30 – The Nagarakretagama, a Javanese eulogy chronicling the journey of the Majapahit king, Hayam Wuruk, through his kingdom, is completed by Mpu Prapanca.
- December 6 – Edward the Black Prince, son of King Edward III of England, sends a letter to King Charles V of France demanding that the French monarch's intervention in Edward's conflict with Count Gaston III of Foix and threatening an armed conflict if Charles refuses.

=== Date unknown ===
- In modern-day southern India, Bahmani Sultan Mohammed Shah I invades the Vijayanagara Empire.
- Muhammed V begins building the Maristan of Granada (a hospital) in Granada (in modern-day Spain).
- The Chagatai Khanate defeats Timur in the Battle of Tashkent.

=== January – March ===
- January 3 – Count Amadeus VI of Savoy, preparing to lead a Christian crusade against the Muslim Turks in the Balkans, names Bonne de Bourbon, his wife, as the regent to govern Savoy during his absence.
- January 6 – As the members of the Savoyard crusade are preparing to depart from Le Bourget-du-Lac in France to fight the Turks in the Balkans, Pope Urban V announces from Avignon that all funding from the Vatican will be discontinued, and revokes two papal bulls that had been issued on April 1, 1364 for a crusade to the Holy Land. While Amadeus persuades Pope Urban to give a papal blessing, no funding is made and Count Amadeus issues a tax on the citizens of Savoy to pay for the crusade.
- January 18 – Dmitry Donskoy, the Grand Prince of Moscow and ruler of much of Russia, marries Eudoxia Dmitriyevna, daughter of Dmitry of Suzdal, Grand Prince of Vladimir, who had taken the office from Donskoy in 1360.
- January 28 – Adam de Bury is removed from the office of Lord Mayor of London by the city's aldermen, and replaced by John Lovekyn.
- January 20 – King Edward III of England sends a summons directing the members of the English Parliament to assemble at Westminster on May 4 for an eight-day session.
- February 8 – Savoyard crusade: Amadeus of Savoy departs from France with a fleet of ships toward Venice, and arrives at Rivoli by February 15.
- February 18 – The Statutes of Kilkenny are passed by the Irish Parliament, which had been summoned by Lionel, Duke of Clarence, Lord Lieutenant of Ireland and son of King Edward III of England, to curb the decline of the Hiberno-Norman Lordship of Ireland.
- March 13 – Enrique of Trastámara deposes his half-brother, King Pedro of Castile, to become the new King of Castile.
- March 19 – Otto VII of Wittelsbach, Elector of Brandenburg, marries Katharine of Luxembourg, daughter of the reigning monarch, Charles IV, Holy Roman Emperor, and widow of the late Rudolf IV, Duke of Austria.Urban 1989, p. 244 On the same day, Katharine's sister Elisabeth marries the new Duke of Austria, Albrecht III.
- March 29 – The coronation of Enrique of Trastamara as King Enrique II of Castile takes place at the Abbey of Santa María la Real de Las Huelgas in Burgos, now in Spain.

=== April – June ===
- April 17 – Paul of Thebes is appointed by Pope Urban V as the new Latin Patriarch of Constantinople
- April 26 – Simon Islip, the Archbishop of Canterbury since 1349, dies at Mayfield, Sussex, three years after having suffered a stroke that deprived him of the power of speech, beginning a vacancy that lasts for a year and a half after Bishop William Edington, declines to become the leader of the English Roman Catholic Church.
- May 4 – The English Parliament assembles at Westminster, but the session adjourns on May 11 without any accomplishments, and does not meet again until 1368.
- May 10 – King Edward III elects William Edgington, Bishop of Winchester, as the new Archbishop of Canterbury, but Edgington declines the office for reasons of health.
- May 25 – Arnaud de Cervole, who had assembled a group of mercenaries to join a crusade against the Turks in Hungary, is murdered by his own men while they are encamped on the Rhône river in France near Mâcon.
- May 29 – After the city councilmen of Bremen refuse to comply with the orders of Bremen's Archbishop-Prince Albert II of Brunswick, troops sent by Albert invade the city, drive out the existing council, and burn the symbol of Bremen's autonomy, the Bremen Roland.
- June 8 – Having raised funding in Pavia and stopped in Padua on June 1 with his fleet, Amadeus of Savoy and his troops arrive at the Republic of Venice, where the Republic provides him additional support.
- June 21 – The Savoyard crusade reaches its next phase as Amadeus and his troops depart from Venice toward Bulgaria.
- June 27 – Count Conrad II of Oldenburg captures the city of Bremen and drives out troops that had been sent by Albert II of Brunswick to end the city's autonomy. Members of the city council, who had been installed temporarily by Albert to replace the existing council members, are beheaded and the autonomy of Bremen and neighboring Stade is restored.
- June 28 – King Lajos of Hungary issues the Decree of Turda in what is now Romania, granting special privileges to nobles of the province of Transylvania "in order to remove, from this country, malefactors belonging to any nation, especially Romanians," including the power to take measures against non-resident Romanian landowners.

=== July – September ===
- July 22 – Pope Urban V suspends aid to the Greek Orthodox Church for a year, and conditions further aid to the return of the Orthodox clergy to Roman Catholicism. In response, the Emperor of Byzantium, John V Palaiologos declines to assist the Savoyard Crusade.
- July 23 – Bahmani–Vijayanagara War (1362–1367): The Battle of Kauthal takes place in what is now the Andhra Pradesh state of India as troops of the Bahmani Kingdom (led by the Sultan Mohammed Shah I defeat a larger force from the Vijayanagara Empire, ruled by the Emperor Bukka Raya I.
- August 11 – Tvrtko Kotromanić, ruler of Bosnia, grants his general, Vukac Hrvatinić, the Pliva Valley župa and the town of Sokol for his loyalty during Bosnia's war against Hungary.
- August 22 – Savoyard crusade: The crusaders under Amadeus launch a naval attack and invasion, led by Francesco I Gattilusio, Prince of Lesbos, against the Turkish-held city of Gelibolu (Gallipoli). The Turks abandon the city and Gelibolu falls to the Crusaders on August 26.
- September 4 – Savoyard crusade: The crusaders' ships arrive off of the coast of Constantinople.
- September 23 – The Treaty of Libourne is signed at the city of Libourne in Aquitaine (now in France) between the recently-deposed King Pedro of Castile, Edward the Black Prince, son of King Edward III of England and heir to the throne; and King Carlos II of Navarre as Prince Edward commits English troops to aid the Spanish troops in fighting invaders from the Kingdom of France and Castile's King Enrique II during the Castilian Civil War.

=== October – December ===
- October 4 – Savoyard crusade: After leaving a contingent of troops to protect Constantinople and the Christian community, Amadeus and his fleet arrive at the coast of Turkish-held Bulgaria, after crossing the Black Sea. By October 20, the crusaders capture Nesebar.
- October 12 – Frederick the Simple, King of Sicily, promulgates a law prohibiting the external decoration of Jewish synagogues, and directs that any existing decorating be taken down.
- October 26 – Comet 55P/Tempel–Tuttle passes within 0.0229 AU (3,430,000 km; 2,130,000 mi) from Earth.
- November 6 – In the city of Amer in what is now the Rajasthan state of India, the Raja Udaikaran becomes the new ruler of the Kingdom of Amber in India as the Raja Johnsi Dev dies after a reign of almost 50 years.
- November 7 – Gerald FitzGerald, 3rd Earl of Desmond replaces Prince Lionel as the Lord Lieutenant of Ireland and Lionel, who had served since 1361, leaves Ireland, vowing never to return.
- December 9 – At the urging of the Mamluk nobles, the Mamluk Sultan Al-Ashraf Sha'ban arrests the Emir Yalbugha al-Umari, who is then taken from prison and dismembered by his attackers.
- December 27 – Red Turban Rebellions: Zhu Yuanzhang begins the 10-month siege of the Chinese city of Suzhou, controlled by the rebel warlord Zhang Shicheng who has plundered the cities of the Jiangsu province and the Zhejiang province for the past 13 years. Zhang is able to resist until the fall of Suzhuou on October 1, 1367, when he is captured and imprisoned at the Ming dynasty center at Nanjing, where Zhu declares himself as the Hongwu Emperor and becomes ruler of China.

=== Date unknown ===
- Abu Faris Abd al-Aziz I of Morocco succeeds assassinated Abu Zayyan as Sultan of the Marinid Empire in Morocco.
- The Den Hoorn brewery is founded at Leuven in the Low Countries. In 1717 this will be renamed the Brouwerij Artois, and later releases a beer in 1926 named Stella Artois.
- Zhu Yuanzhang, leader of the Red Turban Rebellion that will overthrow the Yuan dynasty and establish the Ming dynasty two years later, begins building the walls for a new capital city at Nanjing.
- Thomas Fraser obtains lands in Aberdeenshire (Scotland) on which he starts the building of a towerhouse, that will later be known as Muchalls Castle.

=== January–March ===
- January 18 – Fernando the Handsome becomes King of Portugal after the death of his father, King Pedro the Avenger.
- January 29 – At Chur in what is now the Swiss Canton of Raetia, the League of God's House is founded in the Old Swiss Confederacy as an agreement between nine communities to come to each other's aid in the event of a crisis.
- February 28 – King Enrique II of Castile sends a letter of challenge to Edward, the Black Prince of England, who has already crossed the Pyrenees into Spain with 27,000 troops, daring him to help King Pedro to reclaim the Castilian throne, prompting Edward to organize an army and invade Spain.
- March 19 – The Battle of Inglesmendi is fought in the Crown of Castile (now in Spain) by English troops led by Edward the Black Prince and supporters of the recently deposed King Pedro of Castile who are seeking to restore Pedro to the Castilian throne, against the supporters of the reigning King Enrique II. The knight William Felton is killed and his brother Thomas Felton is taken prisoner of war.
- March 29 – (14th waning of Tagu 728 ME) In what is now Myanmar, Pyanchi becomes the King of Toungoo upon the death of his father, King Theingaba.

=== April–June ===
- April 3 – Battle of Nájera: Pedro of Castile is restored as King of Castile (in modern-day Spain) after defeating his half-brother, King Enrique the Fratricidal. Pedro is aided in the battle by the English under Edward the Black Prince, and Henry by the French.
- April 24 – Otto I, "the Evil", becomes Duke of the independent city of Göttingen (in modern-day Germany) on the death of his father, Ernst I.
- May 2 – At Burgos in Spain, Edward the Black Prince of England attempts to get himself and his soldiers paid by King Pedro of Castile for their services at the battle of Najera, but receives instead a renewal of a bond to secure the debt owed.
- May 20 – John of Ashwell becomes the new Attorney General for England and Wales upon the departure of Thomas of Shardelow.
- May 31 – King Robert III of Scotland names his son Prince James of Stewart as the Earl of Atholl, a title traditionally given to the heir of the Scottish throne.
- June 20 – The author Geoffrey Chaucer is appointed by King Edward III of England as a valet de chambre as a means of receiving a regular income while pursuing his writing. By 1372, Chaucer delivers his first epic poem, The Book of the Duchess, in honor of Duchess Blanche of Lancaster.

=== July–September ===
- July 9 – Guy de Blois, Count of Sissons, held hostage by Enguerrand VII de Coucy, Earl of Bedford, is forced to surrender Soissons to Bedford in return for his freedom.
- July 19 – King Charles V of France issues a royal edict ordering the bonne villes (defined as "the French town that enjoyed especial royal favour") to improve their defenses by improving town walls, towers and gateways.
- July 26 – At Avignon, Pope Urban V learns of a possible invasion of France by John of Gaunt and his intention to capture Provence, and writes to England's King Edward III to take steps to prevent it.
- August 31 – In Switzerland, Amadeus IV, Count of Geneva become the new Count of Geneva when his brother, Aymon III, dies of battle wounds after only seven months after taking office on January 18.
- September 5 – In what is now Myanmar, Swa Saw Ke becomes the new King of Ava two days after the death of his brother-in-law, King Thado Minbya, and following the decision of Thilawa of Yamethin to reject the offer of the throne.
- September 17 – One month before his appointment as Bishop of Winchester, William of Wykeham is confirmed as the Chancellor of England following his appointment by King Edward III.
- September 28 – The Battle of Tripoli is fought in Lebanon as the Muslim Mamluk Syrian army, led by the Emir Idmor, repels Christian invaders led by King Peter of Cyprus

=== October–December ===
- October 1 – Red Turban Rebellions: Zhu Yuanzhang takes Suzhou from Zhang Shicheng, who unsuccessfully attempts suicide before being captured and taken to Nanjing, where he dies.
- October 16 – Pope Urban V makes the first attempt to move the Papacy back to Rome from Avignon. This move is reversed in 1370, when he is forced to return to Avignon, and shortly afterwards dies.
- November 19 – In Germany, the Kölner Konföderation is founded by eight German members of the Hanseatic League (Lübeck, Rostock, Stralsund, Wismar, Kulm and Thorn, and five non-League Dutch cities (Amsterdam, Brielle, Harderwijk,Elbing and Kampen) to fight against the Kingdom of Denmark, whose ruler King Valdemar IV, has been seizing land to expand the territory owned by the Danish crown.
- December 28 – During the Red Turban Rebellions, Hu Mei captures Shaowu, while Xu Da and Chang Yuchun capture Jinan, bringing both under the Hongwu Emperor Zhu Yuanzhang's control.

=== Date unknown ===
- Winter – Construction of a stone Moscow Kremlin Wall around the city is begun to resist invasion by the Grand Duchy of Lithuania.
- Petru I succeeds his grandfather Bogdan I as voivode (ruler) of Moldavia.
- The first university in Pécs, Hungary, is founded by King Louis I.

=== January–March ===
- January 12 – Zhu Yuanzhang declares himself as Emperor of China and forces Emperor Huizong of the Yuan dynasty to flee the capital, Yingtian (now Nanjing).
- January 23 – Zhu Yuanzhang establishes the Ming dynasty with himself as the Emperor Hongwu. The new dynasty will last until 1644. The Emperor immediately orders every county magistrate to set up four granaries, and halts government taxation on books. Work begins later year on restoring the surviving Great Wall of China.
- February 13 – Otto VII, Elector of Brandenburg signs the Treaty of Dramburg a treaty with King Casimir III of Poland, returning the town of Wôłcz (now Walcz) to Poland's control.
- February 24 – King Edward III of England summons the English Parliament to meet at Westminster on May 1.
- March 4 – On behalf of Louis of Anjou, brother of France's King Charles V, Bertrand Du Guesclin and 2,000 troops began a siege of the city of Tarascon, which surrenders to him on March 22.
- March 7 –
  - Mamluk raid on Cyprus (1368): Acting at the orders of Egypt's Mamluk Sultan al-Ashraf Sha'ban, General Ibrahim al-Tazi lands with 500 troops at Cyprus and begins a 23-day raid.
  - The new Ōan era is proclaimed in Japan, ending the Jōji era because of problems in 1367 with an epidemic and natural disasters.
- March 16 – 12th waning of Tabaung, 729 ME. In what is now Myanmar, the coronation of Swa Saw Ke as King of Ava is held. Swa Saw Ke had taken power on six months earlier on September 5, but waited for the court astrologers to determine the ideal date for the coronation ceremony.
- March 29 – Emperor Chōkei accedes to the throne of Japan.
- March 30 – Mamluk raid on Cyprus (1368): Ibrahim al-Tazi completes raid by Egypt's Mamluk Sultanate on the Kingdom of Cyprus and begins sending back captured treasure.

=== April–June ===
- April 4 – The siege of Copenhagen, capital of the Kingdom of Denmark, is started by the Hanseatic League as 37 ships and 2,000 soldiers arrive at the city after sailing from the German city of Lübeck under the leadership of the city's leader, Bruno von Warendorp. The invaders bring with them 400 horses and eight trebuchets (long range catapults) and four regular catapults. While the city falls in four weeks, the Absalon fortress on Slotsholmen island holds out for two months.
- April 30 – Henry of Trastámara, deposed a year earlier from his position as King of Castile and Leon, captures the city of León after a siege of more than three months.
- May 1 – The English Parliament is opened for a 21-day session by King Edward III.
- May 2 – Copenhagen, capital of Denmark, falls to the Hanseatic League four weeks after the April 4 invasion of the kingdom and King Valdemar IV is forced to flee while the city is pillaged and looted by troops led by Bruno von Warendorp.
- May 10 – Forces of the Republic of Venice suppress the Revolt of Saint Titus against Venetian rule in the Kingdom of Candia on the island of Crete).
- May 21 – The English Parliament adjourns and King Edward III gives royal assent multiple new laws, including the landmark Observance of Due Process of Law, "declaring that none shall be put to answer an accusation made to the King without presentment", still in effect more than 650 years later. The King also approves the Naturalisation Act (" Children born beyond sea in the King's dominions shall be inheritable in England".
- May 25 – The Duchy of Wolgast, created more than 200 years earlier in 1160 as part of the division of the Duchy of Pomerania, is divided among the heirs of the late Barnim IV, who had been co-ruler with his brothers Wartislaw V and Bogislaw V.
- June 10 – Michele Morosini becomes the new Doge of the Republic of Venice and replaces the late Doge Andrea Contarini, but he serves for only four months before dying in office at the age of 74.
- June 16 – The siege of Copenhagen by the Hanseatic League ends as the remaining defenders of Absalon Castle surrender and the building is destroyed.

=== July–September ===
- July 28 – With the death of Bolko II the Small, one of the Dukes of Silesia, his widow Agnes of Austria receives control of the Duchy of Świdnica, the duchies of Jawor, Lwówek Śląski and Lusatia, and half of five other Polish duchies (Brzeg, Oława from, Siewierz, Głogów and Ścinawa. Upon her death 14 years later, the duchies are all incorporated into the Crown of Bohemia and its ruler, Wenceslaus IV.
- August 15 – The Ming General Xu Da sets off from Kaifeng at the direction of the Chinese Emperor Hongwu, with plans to rid China of the former Yuan dyansty Emperor Huizong.
- August 25 – Count Gottfried IV of Ambsbe, who has no children, sells Arnsberg to the Duchy of Westphalia by way of the Archbishop of Köln, for 30,000 guilders, allowing Westphalia to complete its reunification.
- September 10 – Xu Da captures the city of Tongzhou after defeating a Yuan army, forcing Huizong to flee to Shangdu.
- September 14 – General Xu Da captures the Yuan city of Khanbaliq and renames it Beiping ("northern peace"), a forerunner to the current name of Beijing ("northern capital").

=== October–December ===
- October 11 – Pope Urban V issues a papal bull appointing William Whittlesey as Archbishop of Canterbury, and "primate of all England".
- October 16 – Michele Morosini dies in office from the bubonic plague, only four months after becoming Doge of Venice, and is replaced by Antonio Venier as the Republic's chief executive.
- October 17 –
  - Lionel, Duke of Clarence, second only to Edward the Black Prince as heir to the throne of England, dies in Italy at the age of 29, less than five months after her May 28 marriage to Violante Visconti, daughter of Galeazzo II Visconti Lord of Milan. Lionel's death, suspected to have been from accidental food poisoning, ends any chance for an alliance between England and Milan.
  - Charles IV, Holy Roman Emperor and Pope Urban V meet at Viterbo in Italy and make plans to enter Rome together after the Pope's travel from Avignon.
- October 21 – Charles greets Pope Urban at Monte Mario, and the two ride together to a welcome in Rome.
- November 1 – Elizabeth of Pomerania, wife of the Charles IV, is crowned as the Empress of the Holy Roman Empire by Pope Urban V.
- November 21 – King Algirdas of Lithuania and the Grand Duke Mikhail II of Tver defeat troops of the Grand Duchy of Moscow in the Battle of the Trosna River, and reach the outside of the Moscow Kremlin Wall that surrounds the capital, but find it to be insurmountable and are unable to mount a siege.
- December 3 – Joanna of Bourbon, Queen consort of France as wife of King Charles V, gives birth to his first child, the Dauphin Charles of Valois. The Dauphin will become King Charles VI in 1380 upon the death of his father.
- December 7 – The Treaty of Plüschow is signed, allowing Albrecht II, Duke of Mecklenburg, to purchase neighboring Schwerin for 20,000 silver Marks to create Mecklenburg-Schwerin, jointly ruled by his wife, Richardis.

=== Date unknown ===
- Durrës, the second-largest city in modern-day Albania (at this time known as Dyrrhachium), is captured from the Angevins by Karl Thopia, a powerful feudal prince and warlord.
- Lațcu, son of Bogdan I, deposes his nephew Petru I, and becomes voivode of Moldavia. (Other sources state that Lațcu had succeeded his father Bogdan in 1367).
- Timur ascends the throne of Samarkand (in modern-day Uzbekistan).
- Maha Thammaracha II becomes ruler of the Sukhothai Kingdom (in modern-day northern Thailand) after the death of Maha Thammaracha I.
- Mikhail Aleksandrovich becomes the sole ruler of Tver (in modern-day western Russia), after the death of co-ruler and rival Vasiliy Mikhailovich of Kashin.
- Moscow attacks Tver, which counter-attacks with the aid of Lithuania and the Blue Horde.
- The King of Norway sends the last Royal Ship from Norway to the Greenland Eastern Settlement. This event is part of both the Norse colonization of the Americas, and of the History of Greenland.
- A peace treaty is signed between Norway and the Hanseatic League.
- The Bibliothèque nationale de France (National Library of France) is founded as the Royal Library at the Louvre Palace in Paris, by Charles V of France.
- Petrarch concludes writing the sequence of Italian sonnets and other poems known as Il Canzoniere.

=== January–March ===
- January 17 – Peter the Fat becomes the new King of Cyprus when his father, King Peter I, is stabbed to death while in bed at the Palace of La Cava in Nicosia. The murder is carried out by a group of noblemen, led by Philip of Ibelin, Henry of Jubail, John of Gaurelle, and James of Nores, along with some outlaws freed from imprisonment earlier in the evening.
- January 25 – King Charles of France sends a summons to Edward the Black Prince, who is residing at Bordeaux, demanding that Edward appear before the King in Paris to answer for Edward's assessment of taxes on the people of Aquitaine. The Black Prince reportedly responds with the threat "We will willingly attend at Paris on the day appointed since the King of France sends for us, but it shall be with our helmet on our head and 60,000 men in our company".
- February 19 – Abu Ishaq Ibrahim II, the Muslim Caliph of Tunis, is killed in a shipwreck at the age of 32 and is succeeded by his 12-year-old son Abu-al-Baqa Khalid II.
- February – Vladislav I of Wallachia liberates Vidin from the Hungarians, resulting in the restoration of Ivan Sratsimir on the throne of Bulgaria, in the autumn.
- March 14 – King Pedro of Castile loses the Battle of Montiel to French soldiers led by Bertrand du Guesclin and Castilians led by his half-brother, Enrique. Pedro takes refuge in a fortress and offers du Guesclin 200,000 gold coins and a promise of several towns in Castile, in return for betraying Enrique. Afterwards, du Guesclin informs Enrique of the offer.
- March 18 – In a period of a few days, more than 800 communities in the Duchy of Aquitaine send requests to King Charles V of France for aid in escaping England's rule.
- March 23 – Enrique of Castile assassinates King Pedro of Castile after Pedro is betrayed by Bertrand du Guesclin.

=== April–June ===
- April 6 –
  - The city of Lucca in Italy pays the Holy Roman Emperor Charles V for the right for self-government, and Cardinal Guy de Montfort is appointed the imperial vicar to secure the debt.
  - King Edward III summons the members of the House of Lords and House of Commons to assemble on June 3 for a session of the English Parliament.
- April 13 – Joanna I of Naples, in her capacity as Countess of Provence, signs a treaty with Louis, Duke of Anjou to end the war between Anjou and Provence.
- April 15 – Saint Elzéar of Sabran (1285-1323) is canonized by Pope Urban V as a saint of the Roman Catholic Church.
- May 7 – Košice, in Slovakia, becomes the first town in Europe to be granted its own coat of arms as King Louis of Hungary grants the right in a charter in recognition of the city's assistance in the Battle of Rozhanovice.
- May 9 – At a meeting of the Estates General in Paris, the delegates approve the resumption of hostilities between France and England.
- May 21 – The Yuan dynasty Chinese warlord of Shaanxi province, Li Siqi, surrenders to the Ming dynasty Emperor Hongwu.
- May 25 – Dương Nhật Lễ becomes the new Emperor of Vietnam (Dai Viet) upon the death of the Emperor Trần Dụ Tông.
- May – King Charles V of France renounces the Treaty of Brétigny, and war is declared between France and England.
- June 3 – At the opening of the English Parliament at Westminster, King Edward III of England proclaims himself to the rightful heir to the throne of France after the Hundred Years' War is resumed by France's King Charles V.
- June 5 – Jean de Lusignan, regent for the King of Cyprus, uses his navy to attack Sidon in what is now Lebanon, but is then forced to retreat because of a storm.
- June 11 – The Parliament of England adjourns after eight days, as King Edward III gives royal assent to acts passed, removing the wool staple of Calais, as well as specifying limits to the import of wine from Gascoigne, and prohibiting the king's butler and lieutenants from taking "more wines than is commanded."
- June 19 – At Ghent, Philip the Bold, Duke of Burgundy and ruler of a realm that includes much of present-day Netherlands and Belgium, marries Margaret, daughter of Louis II of Flanders.
- June 27 – Thomas de Brantingham succeeds John Barnet as the Lord High Treasurer of England.

=== July–September ===
- July 9 – Lusignan of Cyprus leads the Cypriots in an unsuccessful attack on Alexandria in Egypt, then retreats, attacks Sidon again on July 19 and then is force by the weather to return to Cyprus, landing back at Famagusta on July 22.
- July 20 –
  - In the continued conquest of Yuan dynasty China by the Ming dynasty, General Chang Yuchun captures the Yuan capital, Shangdu, forcing the Yuan Emperor Huizong to flee further northward.
  - The kingdoms of England and Scotland sign a 14-year-truce.Dowden, John (1912). The Bishops of Scotland. Glasgow: J. Maitland Thomson.
- August 15 – Philippa of Hainault, wife of King Edward III, dies after 39 years as Queen consort of England.
- August 23 – John of Gaunt, Duke of Lancaster, lands with English troops at Calais to begin a raid in France while Philip the Bold, Duke of Burgundy, assembles troops to confront the English invasion. The standoff continues while Lancaster waits for additional troops from the Earl of Warwick.
- August 24 – Danish–Hanseatic War (1361–1370): After an 18-month siege by the armies of the Hanseatic League and the Kingdom of Sweden, Denmark recaptures Lindholmen Castle and forces a retreat by King Albert of Sweden along with the Hansa and Swedish forces.
- August 29 – Vladislav I of Wallachia obtains, by permission from the King of Hungary, control of the Transylvanian duchies of Almas and Fagaras
- September 2 – Philip the Bold, Duke of Burgundy, is forced to disband the army that he had assembled to capture Normandy from the control of England, after being ordered by King Charles V of France.
- September 22 – Ludovico II Gonzaga becomes the new Lord of Mantua upon the death of his father, Guido Gonzaga.
- September 29 – The Treaty of Scharding is signed between Duke Albrecht III of Austria and Duke Stephen II of Bavaria to end the dispute over control of Tyrol.
- September – Hundred Years' War: The French burn Portsmouth, England; the English raid Picardy and Normandy.

=== October–December ===
- October 18 – John V Palaiologos, partiarch of Constantinople and leader of the Eastern Orthodox Christian faith, meets in Rome with the Roman Catholic Pope Urban V and agrees to recognize the Pope as the leader of all Christendom, after negotiation between Rome and Constantinople had been made by Demetrios Chrysoloras.
- November 30 – Hundred Years' War: Charles V of France recaptures most of Aquitaine from the English.
- December 7 – The Estates General in France approves the request by King Charles V to raise taxes in order to finance the renewed war with England.
- December 25 – Frederick the Simple, King of Sicily, issues an order on Christmas Day directing all Jews on the island to wear a red badge identifying their heritage.S. O. "Sicily". The Jewish Encyclopedia. p. 324. "The wearing of a special badge was ordered by the same monarch on Dec. 25, 1369. The badge consisted of piece of red material, not smaller than the largest royal seal; men were required to wear it, under the chin, and women on the breast."
- December – Financed by Charles V of France, Welshman Owain Lawgoch launches an invasion fleet against the English, in an attempt to claim the throne of Wales.A storm causes Owain to abandon the invasion.

=== Dates unknown ===
- The Ottoman Empire invades Bulgaria.
- The Ottomans capture Adrianople (the modern-day city of Edirne) from the Byzantine Empire, reducing its territory to the city of Constantinople, Thessaloniki, part of the Peloponessus, and some islands. Adrianopole becomes the capital city of the Ottoman Sultanate.
- Venice repels a Hungarian invasion.
- The Thai Ayutthaya Kingdom incursions Cambodia for a second time.
- Charles V of France orders Hugues Aubriot to construct the fortress of the Bastille in Paris.
- Timur names the city of Samarkand as the capital of his empire.
- The Hongwu Emperor of the Chinese Ming dynasty issues a decree ordering every country magistrate in the empire to open a Confucian school of learning.
- The official production of Jingdezhen porcelain in Ming dynasty China is on record.

== Significant people ==
- The Hongwu Emperor (Zhu Yuanzhang), founder of the Ming dynasty

== Births ==
1360

- January 8 – Ulrich von Jungingen, German Grand Master of the Teutonic Knights (d. 1410)
- March 31 – Philippa of Lancaster, queen consort of Portugal (d. 1415)
- May 2 – Yongle Emperor of China (d. 1424)
- June 24 – Nuno Álvares Pereira, Portuguese general (d. 1431)
- August 10 – Francesco Zabarella, Italian jurist (d. 1417)
- date unknown
  - Amadeus VII, Count of Savoy (d. 1391)
  - Bayezid I, sultan of the Ottoman Empire (d. 1403)
  - Giovanni di Bicci de' Medici, Italian banker, founder of the Medici dynasty of Florence (d. 1429)
  - Yi Chongmu, Korean general (d. 1425)
  - Andrei Rublev, Russian painter (d. 1430)
  - Stanislaw of Skarbimierz, Polish religious writer (d. 1431)

1361

- February 26 – Wenceslaus, King of the Romans, King of Bohemia (d. 1419)
- date unknown
  - John Beaumont, 4th Baron Beaumont, Constable of Dover Castle (d. 1396)
  - Isabella, Countess of Foix, vassal ruler (d. 1428)
  - King Charles III of Navarre (d. 1425)
  - She Xiang, Chinese tribute chieftain (d. 1396)

1362

- January 16 – Robert de Vere, 9th Earl of Oxford and Duke of Ireland (d. 1392)
- Empress Xu (Ming dynasty) of China (d. 1407)
- probable – Wang Fu, Chinese painter (d. 1416)
- date unknown
  - Adolf I, Count of Nassau-Siegen (d. 1420)
  - Murdoch Stewart, 2nd Duke of Albany (d. 1425)

1363

- July 2 – Maria, Queen of Sicily (d. 1401)
- December 13 – Jean Gerson, chancellor of the University of Paris (d. 1429)
- date unknown
  - Margaret of Bavaria, Burgundian regent (d. 1423)
  - Thomas Langley, bishop of Durham and lord chancellor of England (d. 1437)
- probable – Zeami Motokiyo, Japanese actor and playwright (d. 1443)

1364

- September – Christine de Pizan, French writer (d. c.1430)
- November 30 – John FitzAlan, 2nd Baron Arundel, English soldier (d. 1390)
- December 16 – Emperor Manuel III of Trebizond (d. 1417)
- date unknown
  - al-Maqrizi, Egyptian historian and biographer (d. 1442)
  - Gyaltsab Je, first throne holder of the Gelug tradition of Buddhism (d. 1432)
  - Qāḍī Zāda al-Rūmī, Persian mathematician (d. 1436)

1365

- January 27 – Edward of Angoulême, French-born royal prince of England (d. 1370)
- July 25 – U of Goryeo, Korean king (d. 1389)
- September 11 – Charles II, Duke of Lorraine, French noble (d. 1431)
- date unknown – Abd al-Karīm al-Jīlī, Baghdadi Sufi author (d. 1424)
- approximate date – Violant of Bar, queen regent of Aragon (d. 1431)

1366

- May 11 – Anne of Bohemia, queen of Richard II of England (d. 1394)
- August 28 – Jean Le Maingre, marshal of France (d. 1421)
- date unknown
  - Elizabeth Fitzalan, Duchess of Norfolk, English noblewoman (d. 1425)
  - Miran Shah, governor of Azerbaijan (d. 1408)
- Approximate
  - Eleanor de Bohun, English noble (d.1399)

1367

- January 6 – King Richard II of England (d. 1400)
- March 22 or 1368 – Thomas de Mowbray, 1st Duke of Norfolk, English politician (d. 1399)
- June 13 – King Taejong of Joseon, Korean king (d. 1422)
- date unknown – Michael de la Pole, 2nd Earl of Suffolk, English politician (d. 1415)
- probable – Mary of Enghien, queen consort of Naples (d. 1446)

1368

- February 14 – Sigismund, Holy Roman Emperor (d. 1437)
- December 3 – King Charles VI of France (d. 1422)
- probable
  - Louis VII, Duke of Bavaria (d. 1447)
  - Ida de Grey, Cambro-Norman noble (d. 1426)
  - Thomas Hoccleve, English poet (d. 1426)

1369

- January/February – Pope Martin V (d. 1431)
- May 28th – Muzio Sforza, Italian condottiero (d. 1424)
- date unknown – William de Ros, 6th Baron de Ros, Lord Treasurer of England (d. 1414)
- probable – King Constantine I of Georgia (d. c. 1412)
- approximate – Jan Hus, Czech priest and philosopher (d. 1415)
- approximate – Margareta, Swedish Sami missionary (d. 1425)

== Deaths ==
1360

- February 26 – Roger Mortimer, 2nd Earl of March, English military leader (b. 1328)
- September 16 – William de Bohun, 1st Earl of Northampton (b. 1319)
- September 29 – Joanna I of Auvergne, queen consort of France (b. 1326)
- November 4 – Elizabeth de Clare, English noblewoman (b. 1295)
- December 26 – Thomas Holland, 1st Earl of Kent
- date unknown
  - David IX of Georgia, King of Georgia
  - Geoffrey the Baker, English chronicler
  - Isabella, Countess of Brienne, Countess of Lecce
  - Nicephorus Gregoras, Byzantine historian (b. 1295)
  - Xu Shouhui, Chinese rebel leader, emperor of Tianwan (b. 1320)

1361

- January 7 – Gerlach I of Nassau-Wiesbaden
- March 17 – An-Nasir Hasan, Mamluk Sultan of Egypt (b. 1334/35)
- March 23 – Henry of Grosmont, Duke of Lancaster, English soldier and diplomat
- May 21 – Orhan Ghazi, Ottoman Sultan (b. 1274)
- June 9 – Philippe de Vitry, French composer (b. 1291)
- June 15 – Johannes Tauler, German mystic theologian
- June 17 – Ingeborg of Norway, princess consort and regent of Sweden (b. 1301)
- September 18 – Louis V, Duke of Bavaria (b. 1315)
- October 4 – John de Mowbray, 3rd Baron Mowbray, English baron (b. 1310)
- October 8 – John Beauchamp, 3rd Baron Beauchamp, Warden of the Cinque Ports
- November 21 – Philip of Rouvres, Duke of Burgundy (plague) (b. 1346)
- date unknown
  - Giovanni, son of Francesco Petrarch (plague)
  - Richard Badew, Chancellor of the University of Cambridge
  - Reynold Cobham, 1st Baron Cobham of Sterborough, English knight and diplomat (b. 1295)
  - Hajji Beg, Barlas leader
  - c. 1362 Blanche of Bourbon

1362

- March – Orhan, Ottoman sultan (b. 1281)
- April 6 – James I, Count of La Marche, French soldier (b. 1319)
- April 10 – Maud, Countess of Leicester (b. 1339)
- May 26 – Louis of Taranto (b. 1320)
- July 11 – Anna von Schweidnitz, empress of Charles IV (b. 1339) (childbirth)
- July 22 – Louis of Durazzo, Italian soldier (poisoned) (b. 1324)
- September 7 – Joan of the Tower, Queen consort of king David II of Scotland (b. 1321)
- September 12 – Pope Innocent VI (b. 1282 or 1295)
- December 10 – Frederick III, Duke of Austria, second son of Duke Albert II of Austria (b. 1347)
- December 21 – Constantine III of Armenia (b. 1313)
- date unknown
  - Hu Dahai, Chinese general
  - Emperor John III of Trebizond

1363

- January 13 – Meinhard III, Count of Tyrol
- March 3 – Simone Boccanegra, first doge of Genoa (approximate date)
- c. April – Blanche of Namur, queen consort of Sweden (b. 1320)
- July 29 – John Bardolf, 3rd Baron Bardolf (b. 1314)
- October 3 – Chen Youliang, founder of the Dahan regime (b. 1320)
- October 7 – Eleanor de Bohun, Countess of Ormonde (b. 1304)
- date unknown
  - Adil-Sultan, khan of the Chagatai Khanate
  - Jean Buridan, French philosopher (b. 1295)
- probable – Ranulf Higdon, English chronicler (b. c. 1299)

1364

- April 8 – King John II of France (b. 1319)
- June 19 – Elisenda of Montcada, queen consort and regent of Aragon (b. 1292)
- June 30 – Arnošt of Pardubice, Archbishop of Prague (b. 1297)
- August 5 – Emperor Kōgon of Japan (b. 1313)
- September 10 – Robert of Taranto
- September 29 – Charles I, Duke of Brittany (b. 1319)
- date unknown
  - Nicholas Alexander, voivode of Wallachia
  - Gajah Mada, prime minister of the Majapahit empire
  - King Valdemar III of Denmark (b. 1314)

1365

- March 8 – Princess Noguk of the Yuan dynasty and queen consort of Goryeo
- May 17 – Louis VI the Roman, Duke of Bavaria and Elector of Brandenburg (b. 1328)
- July 27 – Rudolf IV, Duke of Austria (b. 1339)
- December 8 – Nicholas II, Duke of Opava (b. 1288)
- date unknown – Zhu Derun, Chinese painter and poet (b. 1294)

1366

- January 25 – Henry Suso, German mystic (b. c. 1295)
- April 26 – Simon Islip, Archbishop of Canterbury
- May 20 – Maria of Calabria, Empress of Constantinople (b. 1329)
- Summer – Ming Yuzhen, founder of the rebel empire of Daxia (b. 1331)
- October 14 – Ibn Nubata, Arab poet (b. 1287)
- October 18 – Petrus Torkilsson, Archbishop of Uppsala

1367

- January – Han Lin'er, Chinese rebel leader, emperor of Han Song (b. 1339)
- January 9 – Giulia della Rena, Italian saint (b. 1319)
- January 18 – King Peter I of Portugal (b. 1320)
- April 13 – John Tiptoft, 2nd Baron Tibetot (b. 1313)
- August 23 – Gil Álvarez Carrillo de Albornoz, Spanish cardinal (b. 1310)
- September 25 – Jakushitsu Genkō, Japanese poet (b. 1290)
- December 28 – Ashikaga Yoshiakira, Japanese shōgun (b. 1330)
- date unknown
  - Bogdan I of Moldavia
  - Zhang Shicheng, Chinese rebel leader, King of Wu (b. 1321)

1368

- March 29 – Emperor Go-Murakami of Japan (b. 1328)
- August 25 – Andrea Orcagna, Italian painter, sculptor and architect
- September 12 – Blanche of Lancaster, English duchess, spouse of John of Gaunt (b. 1345)
- October 7 – Lionel of Antwerp, Duke of Clarence, son of Edward III of England (b. 1338)
- undated – Maha Thammaracha I, Thai ruler of the Sukhothai Kingdom and Buddhist philosopher (b. c.1300)
- probable – Ibn Battuta, Arabian traveler

1369

- January 17 – King Peter I of Cyprus (murdered) (b. 1328)
- March 23 – King Peter of Castile (b. 1334) (murdered after the battle of Montiel)
- August 15 – Philippa of Hainault, queen of Edward III of England (b. 1311) (dropsy)
- October 3 – Margaret, Countess of Tyrol (b. 1318)
- November 13 – Thomas Beauchamp, 11th Earl of Warwick
- date unknown
  - Sir John Chandos, English knight
  - Agnes Dunbar, Countess of Moray
  - Magnus I, Duke of Brunswick-Lüneburg
  - Ramathibodi I, first king of Ayutthaya (b. 1314)
