= 1396 =

1396 in various calendars
- Gregorian calendar: 1396; MCCCXCVI
- Ab urbe condita: 2149
- Armenian calendar: 845; ԹՎ ՊԽԵ
- Assyrian calendar: 6146
- Balinese saka calendar: 1317–1318
- Bengali calendar: 802–803
- Berber calendar: 2346
- English Regnal year: 19 Ric. 2 – 20 Ric. 2
- Buddhist calendar: 1940
- Burmese calendar: 758
- Byzantine calendar: 6904–6905
- Chinese calendar: 乙亥年 (Wood Pig); 4093 or 3886 — to — 丙子年 (Fire Rat); 4094 or 3887
- Coptic calendar: 1112–1113
- Discordian calendar: 2562
- Ethiopian calendar: 1388–1389
- Hebrew calendar: 5156–5157
- Hindu calendars
- Vikram Samvat: 1452–1453
- Shaka Samvat: 1317–1318
- Kali Yuga: 4496–4497
- Holocene calendar: 11396
- Igbo calendar: 396–397
- Iranian calendar: 774–775
- Islamic calendar: 798–799
- Japanese calendar: Ōei 3 (応永３年)
- Javanese calendar: 1310–1311
- Julian calendar: 1396; MCCCXCVI
- Korean calendar: 3729
- Minguo calendar: 516 before ROC 民前516年
- Nanakshahi calendar: −72
- Thai solar calendar: 1938–1939
- Tibetan calendar: ཤིང་མོ་ཕག་ལོ་ (female Wood-Boar); 1522 or 1141 or 369 — to — མེ་ཕོ་བྱི་བ་ལོ་ (male Fire-Rat); 1523 or 1142 or 370

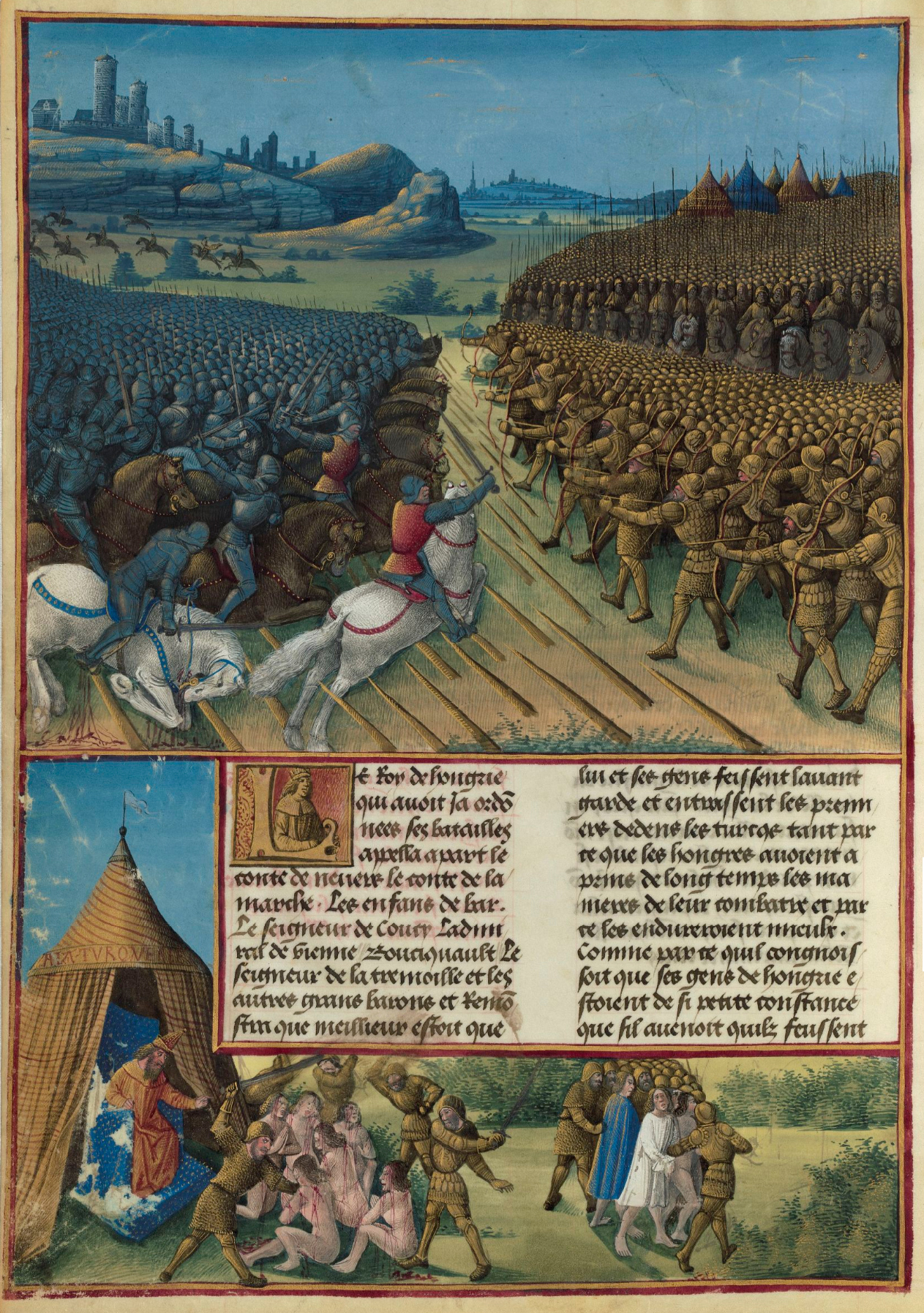
September 25: The Ottoman Empire defeats the Christian Crusaders at the Battle of Nicopolis.

Year 1396 (MCCCXCVI) was a leap year starting on Saturday of the Julian calendar.

== Events ==
=== January–December ===
- January 4 – Irene Shpata, daughter of Gjin Bua Shpata, becomes the new Ottoman Despotess of Ioannina when she marries the despot Esau de' Buondelmonti of Epirus.
- February 4 – (24 Rabi II 798 AH) Hasan ibn Ajlan becomes the Emir of Mecca as his brother Muhammad ibn Ajlan steps aside.
- March 9 – King Richard II of England, 29, marries Princess Isabelle of France, the 6-year-old daughter of King Charles VI of France, by proxy. The two will marry in person on October 31 in Calais.
- March 28 – A War Council in Buda, led by King Sigismund of Hungary is held with representatives of various Christian nations to begin the Nicopolis Crusade against the Muslims of the Ottoman Empire for the liberation of Bulgaria.

=== April–June ===
- April 30 – Thousands of Christian crusaders from France depart from Dijon and march to Strasbourg, then sail on the Danube river to join forces with King Sigismund.
- May 19 – Martin I succeeds his brother, John I, as King of Aragon (modern-day northeastern Spain).
- June 14 – The University of Zadar is founded with the establishment of a theological seminary in the Croatian city.
- July 20 – Queen Margaret I of Denmark, Norway and Sweden publishes the Treaty of Kalmar, proposing the personal union of the three kingdoms of Denmark, Norway (with Iceland, Greenland, the Faroe Islands, Shetland and Orkney) and Sweden (including Finland and Åland).

=== July–September ===
- July 23 – Queen Margaret makes her great-nephew and adopted son Erik of Pomerania joint ruler of Sweden. Eric has already been made joint ruler of Norway.
- August 29 – The Battle of Schoterzijl is fought in the third of the Friso-Hollandic Wars between Holland, led by Albert I of Bavaria, and Friesland, a semi-independent kingdom, led by Juw Juwinga. Although Juwinga is killed in battle, the Frisians are able to hold onto independence.
- September 12 – The Crusaders, with more than 17,000 troops from France, Hungary, the Knights Hospitaler, Wallachia and the Holy Roman Empire, arrive at the outskirts of Nicopolis (now Nikopol in Bulgaria).
- September 19 – John V marries Joan of France.
- September 25 – Battle of Nicopolis: The Ottomans defeat a joint crusade by Hungary, France, the Holy Roman Empire, and Wallachia, led by King Sigismund of Hungary. This is the last large-scale crusade of the Middle Ages.
- late September – Battle of the North Inch ("Battle of the Thirty"): In a mass trial by combat on the North Inch of Perth, Scotland, the Clan Cameron defeat the Clan Mackintosh. Records refer to "warpipes" being carried into battle, perhaps predecessors of the Great Highland bagpipe.

=== October–December ===
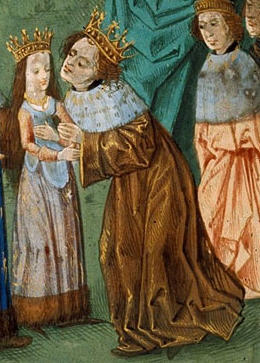
King Richard and his six-year-old bride

- October 31 – The widowed Richard II of England (29), and six-year-old Isabella of Valois (daughter of Charles VI of France), are married in Calais, resulting in a temporary peace between the kingdoms of England and France.
- October – A Transylvanian expedition captures Vlad I Uzurpatorul, thus allowing the restoration of Mircea the Elder of Wallachia to the throne.
- November 24 – The Transit of Venus, the last not to be part of a pair, is possibly observed by Aztec astronomers.
- November 27 – Antoniotto I Adorno, Doge of the Republic of Genoa, voluntarily steps down and turns control of the republic over to France's King Charles VI. King Charles then appoints Adorno as the governor of French-ruled Genoa.
- November 29 – Ralph Neville, 1st Earl of Westmorland, marries Joan Beaufort in England.
- November 30 – King Richard II summons the members of the English House of Lords and the House of Commons to open the English Parliament on January 22.
- December 30 – Waleran III of Luxembourg, becomes the French Governor of the former Republic of Genoa.

=== Date unknown ===
- The Ottomans capture the Bulgarian fortress of Vidin and Tsar Ivan Sratsimir, ending the Second Bulgarian Empire. The Bulgarian state is reestablished in 1878 as the Principality of Bulgaria.
- France conquers the Republic of Genoa.
- After a 14-year interregnum, Pedro de San Superano is declared ruler of the Principality of Achaea (modern-day Peloponnese, southern Greece).
- Abu Amir succeeds Abdul Aziz II as ruler of the Marinid dynasty, in modern-day Morocco.
- Timur appoints his son Miran Shah, as Timurid viceroy of present-day Azerbaijan.
- The Kart dynasty is brought to an end in east Persia after its remaining rulers are murdered at a banquet by Miran Shah.
- Philibert de Naillac succeeds Juan Fernández de Heredia, as Grand Master of the Knights Hospitaller.
- Huitzilihuitl succeeds his father, Acamapichtli, as ruler of the Aztecs.
- The Ulu Camii Mosque is built in Bursa by the Ottomans.
- The Ming dynasty court of China sends two envoys, Qian Guxun and Li Sicong, to the Ava Kingdom of Burma and the Tai polity of the Mong Mao, in order to resolve a dispute between these two. The travels of the Chinese ambassadors are recorded in the historical text of the Baiyi Zhuan.
- Timur orders the construction of a garden in a meadow, House of Flowers.
- Peasants in the modern-day provinces of Hunan and Hubei in the east of China plant 84 million fruit trees.

== Births ==
- July 31 – Philip the Good, Duke of Burgundy (d. 1467)
- October 16 – William de la Pole, 1st Duke of Suffolk, English noble (d. 1450)
- date unknown
  - Alfonso V of Aragon (d. 1458)
  - Bonne of Artois, countess regent of Nevers (d. 1425)
  - Ambroise de Loré, baron of Ivry in Normandy (d. 1446)
  - Michelozzo, Italian architect and sculptor (d. 1472)
  - Ponhea Yat, ruler of the Khmer Empire (d. 1460?)

== Deaths ==
- January 11 – Isidore Glabas, Metropolitan bishop of Thessalonica (b. 1341/2)
- May 19 – John I of Aragon (b. 1350)
- July 31 – William Courtenay, Archbishop of Canterbury
- September 15 – Queen Sindeok, politically active Korean queen (b. 1356)
- November 29 – Robert Ferrers, 3rd Baron Ferrers of Wemme (b. 1373)
- date unknown
  - John Beaumont, 4th Baron Beaumont, Constable of Dover Castle (b. 1361)
  - Frederick II, Marquess of Saluzzo
  - Maddalena Buonsignori, Italian law professor at the University of Bologna
  - Saint Stephen of Perm (b. 1340)
  - She Xiang, Chinese tribute chieftain (b. 1361)
