= Mamluk raid on Cyprus (1368) =

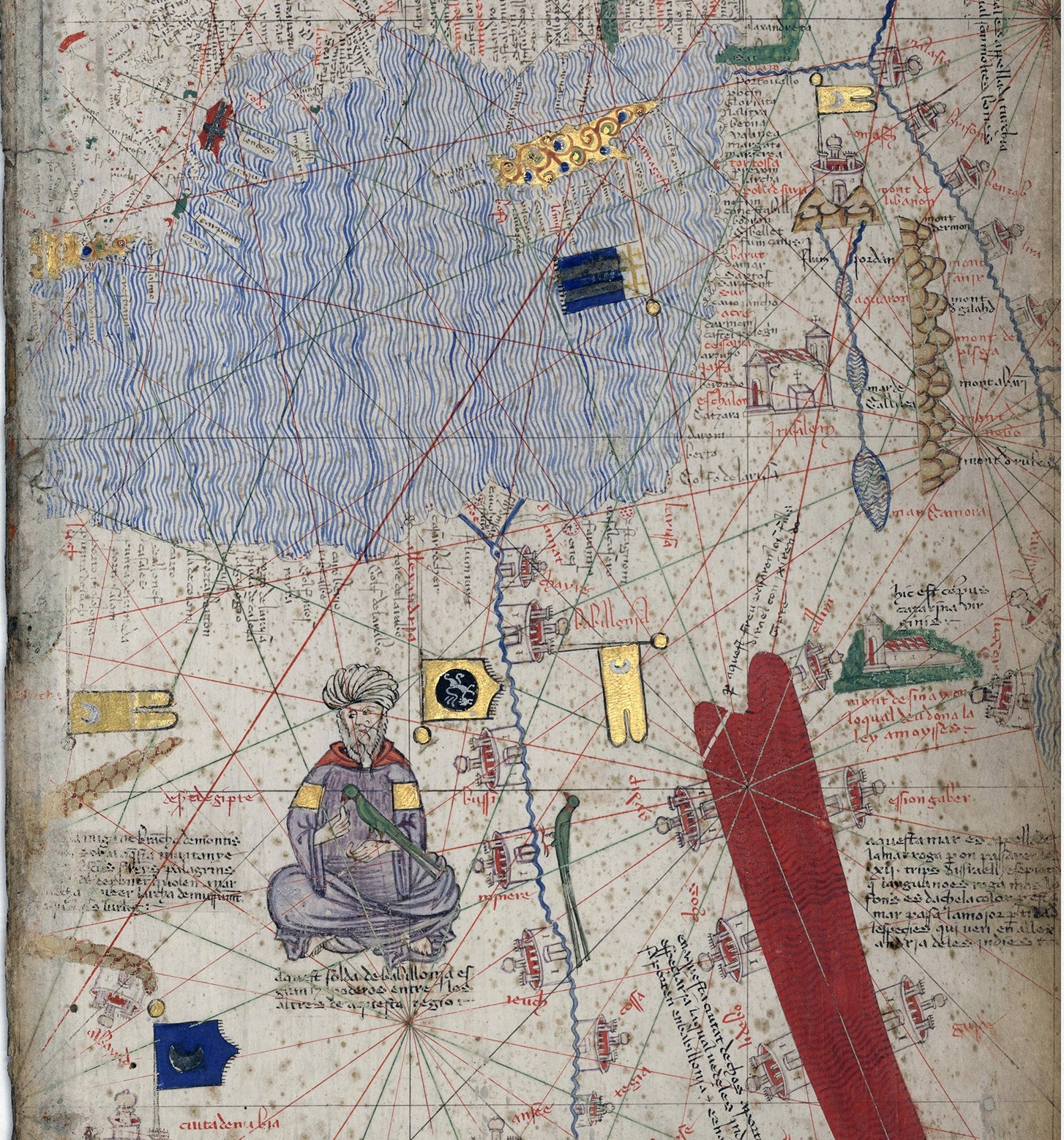
- The eastern Mediterranean in the contemporary Catalan Atlas (1375), with a representation of the Mamluk sultan figuring prominently
Date	March–April 1368
Location	Cyprus

Belligerents
Mamluk Sultanate	Kingdom of Cyprus

Commanders and leaders
Ibrahim al-Tazi	Unknown

Strength
500 men 2 ships	Unknown

Casualties and losses
Unknown	35 prisoners 1 or 2 ships

The Mamluk Sultanate launched a naval raid on the Kingdom of Cyprus in March 1368. The raid was a delayed response to the Alexandrian Crusade of October 1365, which had been spearheaded by King Peter I of Cyprus.

The main sources for the expedition are Leontios Makhairas, al-Maqrizi and al-Nuwayri.

== Construction of the Mamluk fleet ==
In response to the Alexandrian Crusade of 1365, the Mamluk atābak Yalbugha al-Umari ordered the construction of a fleet at Cairo. Ibn Qāḍī Shuhba dates this to November–December 1365, but al-Maqrizi, who is probably more reliable, places it in January–February 1366, at the same time as a fleet was ordered in Beirut.

Procurement in Cairo was the responsibility of the vizier Mājid ibn al-Qazwīna, while construction was overseen by Ṭaybughā and Bahāʾ al-Dīn ibn al-Mufassar. According to al-Maqrizi, the craftsmen and sailors were imported from the Maghreb or recruited from among the Turcomans of Upper Egypt. According to al-Nuwayri, the fleet cast off on 28 November 1366. According to al-Maqrizi, there were 100 ships, each under the command of an emir. The Prise d'Alexandrie, however, puts the number of ships at 200.

== Raid on Cyprus ==
In May 1366, the Ottomans offered to send 100 ships in a joint attack on Cyprus, but the Mamluks could not commit, since their fleet was still under construction. In March 1368, the privateer brothers Peter and John Grimante, sailing from Famagusta raided Alexandria and Damietta, seizing several ships. In Alexandria, they faced strong resistance from the captain of the arsenal, Ibrahim al-Tazi, who was from the Maghreb.

Sultan al-Ashraf Sha'ban immediately summoned al-Tazi to Cairo and offered him command of the fleet, moored at Boulaq, for a raid against Cyprus. Al-Tazi opted to take only a single ship from Cairo together with another from Alexandria. He set sail from the port of Alexandria with 500 of his crew for an armed reconnaissance of the Cypriot coast. According to al-Nuwayri, he sent back a boat full of booty on 30 March. He captured one or two boats before being forced to retreat by Genoese galleys in Cypriot service. He returned to Alexandria in mid-April or early May. The sources are not entirely consistent, but the raid lasted about 23 days. During the raid the Mamluks captured 35 Cypriots.
