= St Michael Chapel =

- Kostol svätého Michala
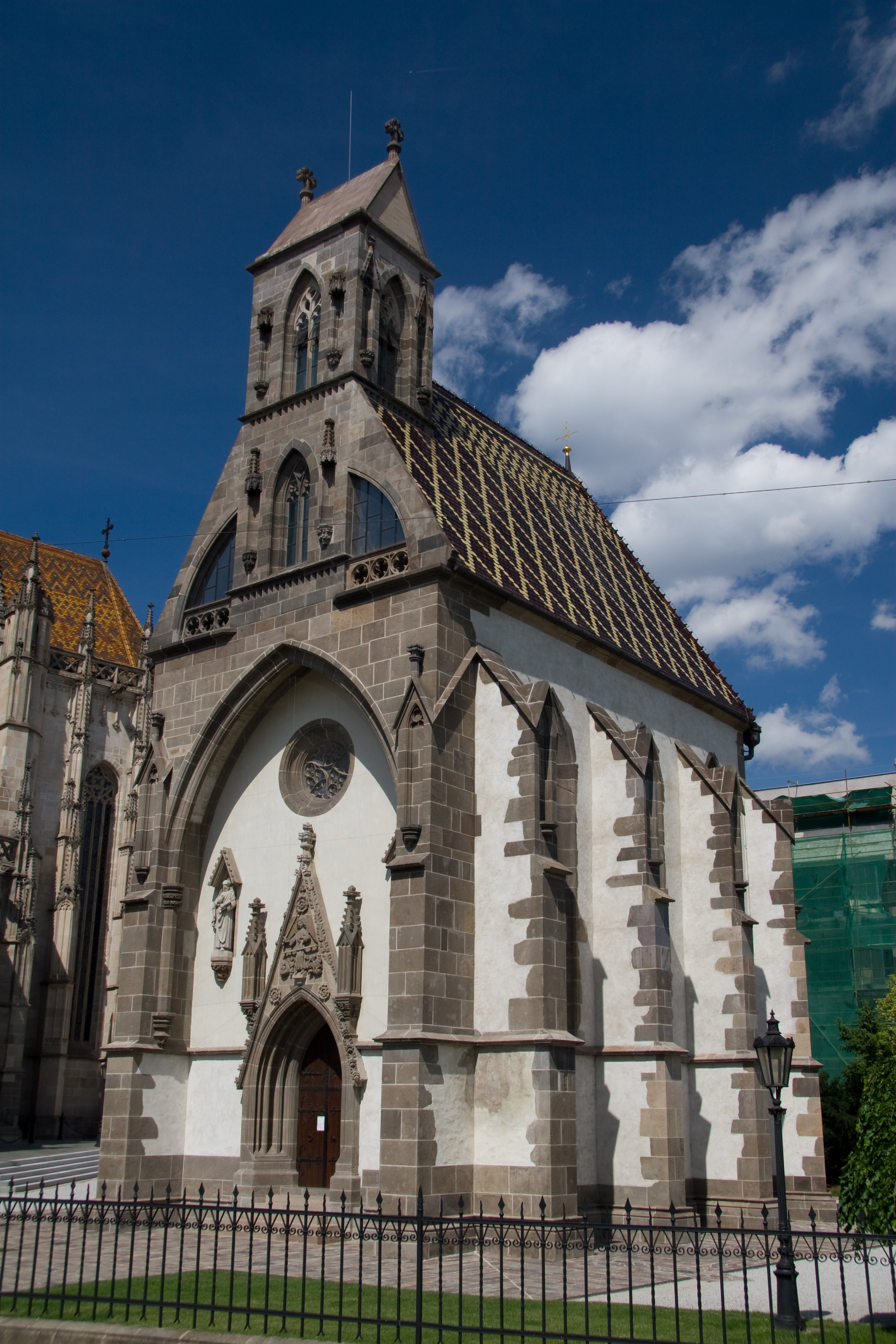
- Interactive map of St Michael Chapel

General information
- Architectural style: Gothic
- Location: Old Town, Košice, Slovakia
- Coordinates: 48°43′12″N 21°15′30″E
- Year built: 1340 – 1380

The Saint Michael Church (Slovak: Kostol svätého Michala) is a Gothic style church in Košice, Slovakia. Originally a chapel (Slovak: Kaplnka svätého Michala), the building became officially a church after its reconstruction in 2006.

== History ==
The Saint Michael Chapel was probably erected in the first half of the 14th century. It was built as a cemetery chapel inside the town walls in the place of the present-day park at Hlavná ulica (English: Main Street). The lower part of the chapel was initially an ossarium, while the upper one served for praying the Office of the Dead.

The chapel served as a Slovak church whereas the Cathedral of Saint Elisabeth was a German and Hungarian church.

During its rebuilding between 1902–1904, they pulled down the northern aisle (erected in 1508) and bricked 17 old gravestones (from the 14th century until the 17th century) into the exterior walls of the chapel to save them from destruction.

The poor condition of the building was the reason of the complex reconstruction from 1998 to 2006. The reconstructed chapel was consecrated on 22 January 2006 by Alojz Tkáč, Archbishop of Košice. After construction was finished, the chapel has since officially become a church.

== Interior ==
The patron of the dead, Saint Michael the Archangel, trampling the Devil, is shown on the facade. The archangels Raphael and Gabriel are on his sides. In the interior, there is a nice stone tabernacle, the ornamental sculpture Ecce Homo and wall paintings from the Middle Ages. The first municipal coat of arms in Europe (dated back to 1369) is situated above the door leading to the vestry.

== Gallery ==
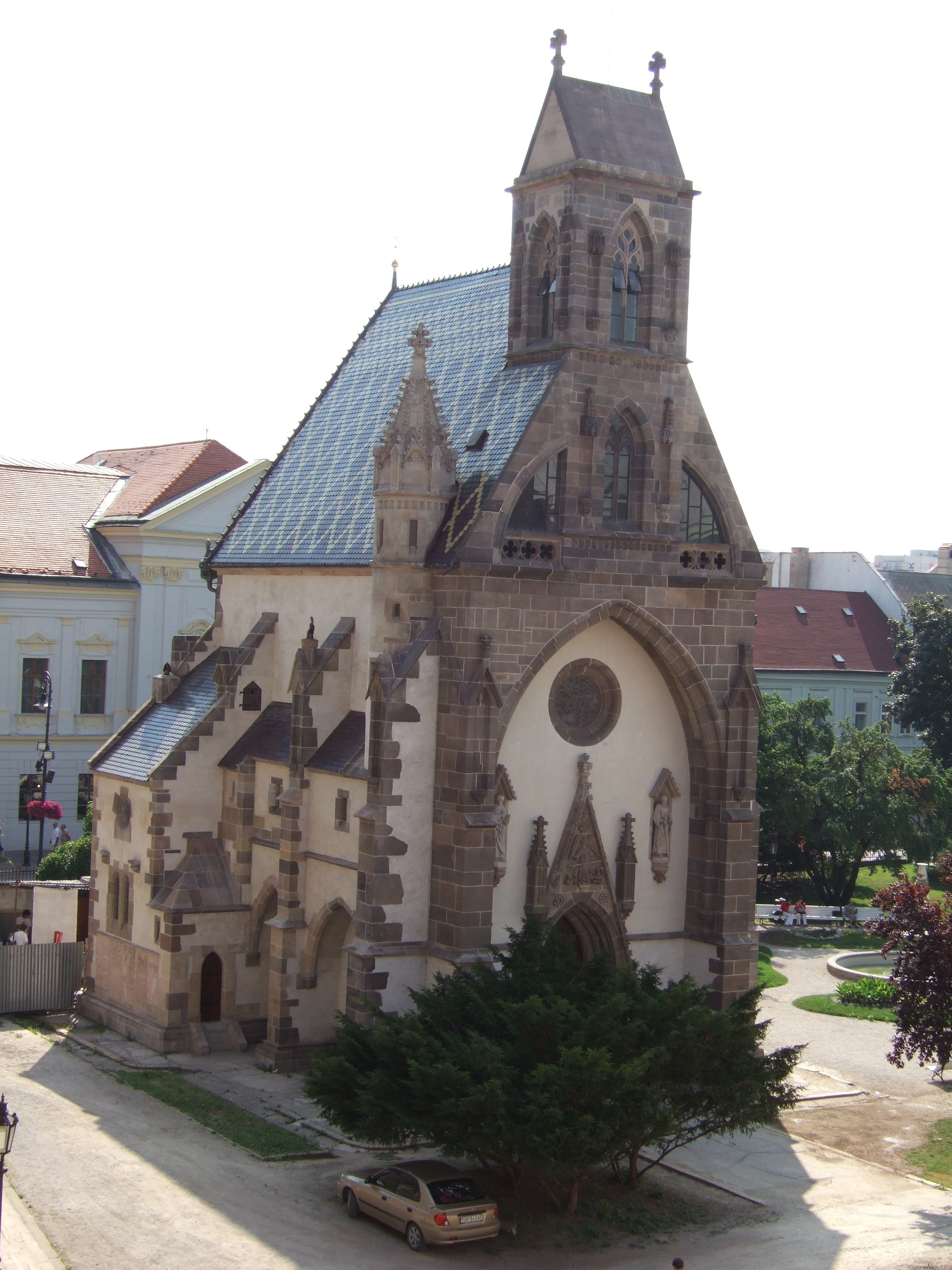

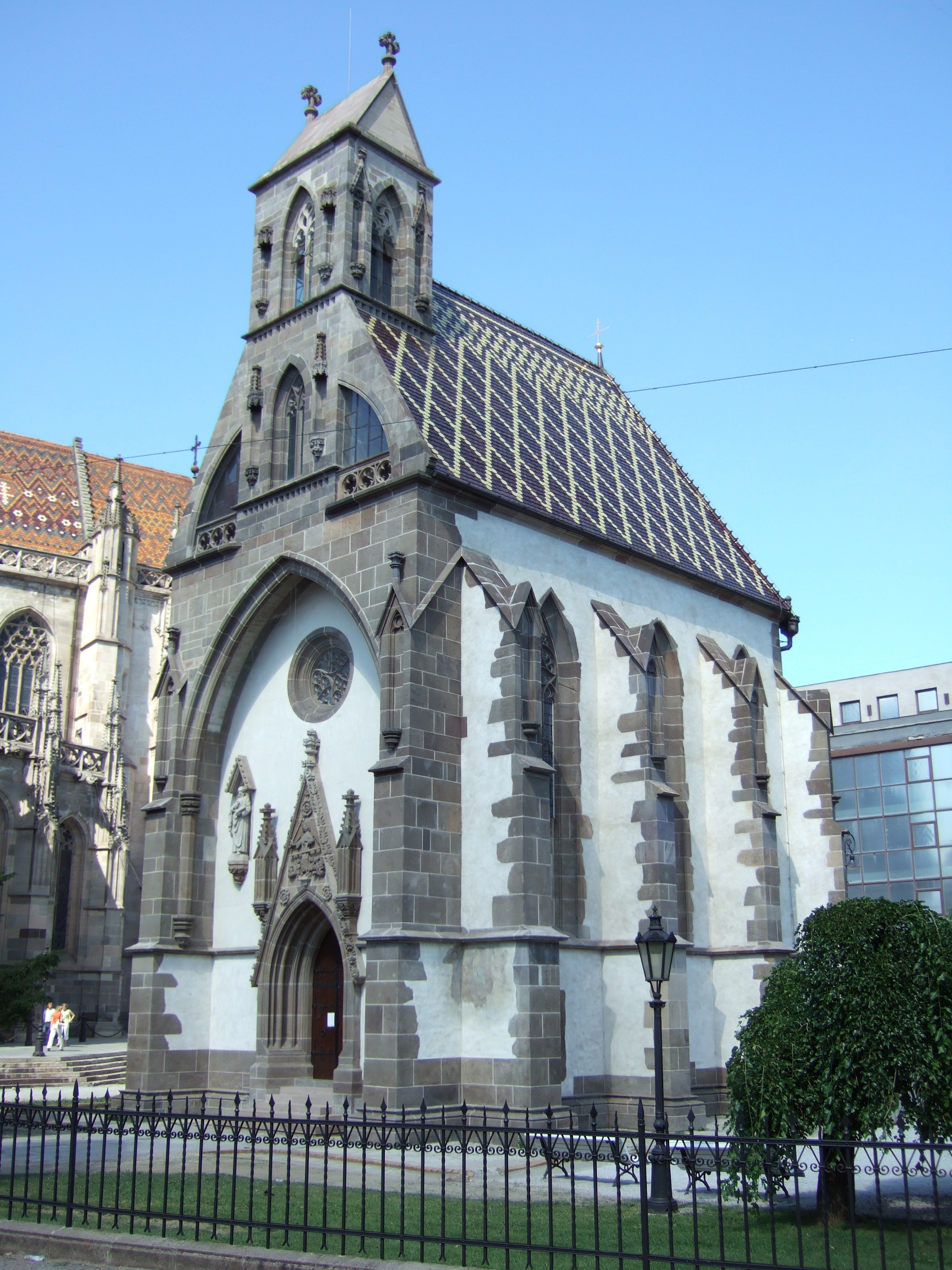

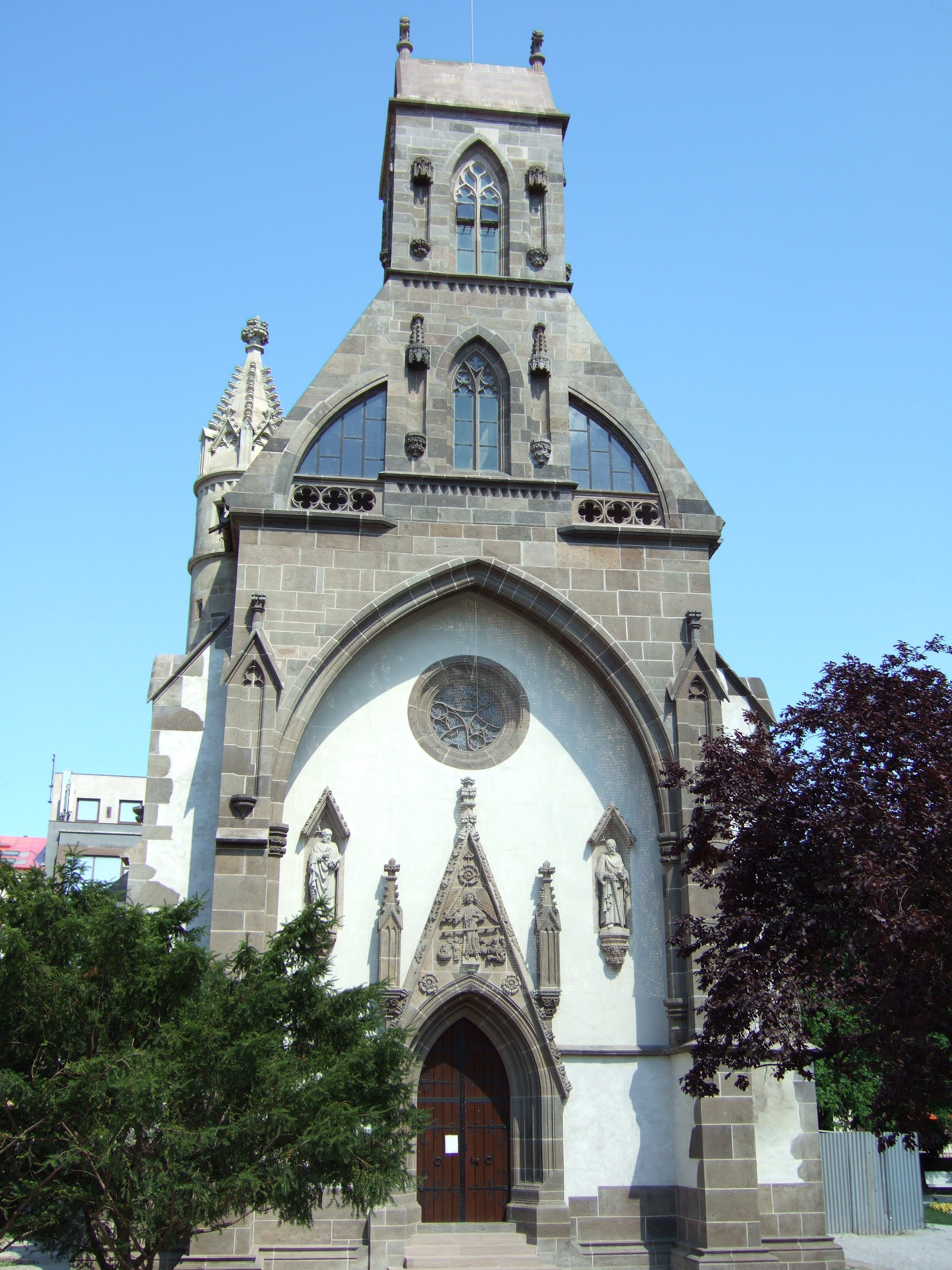

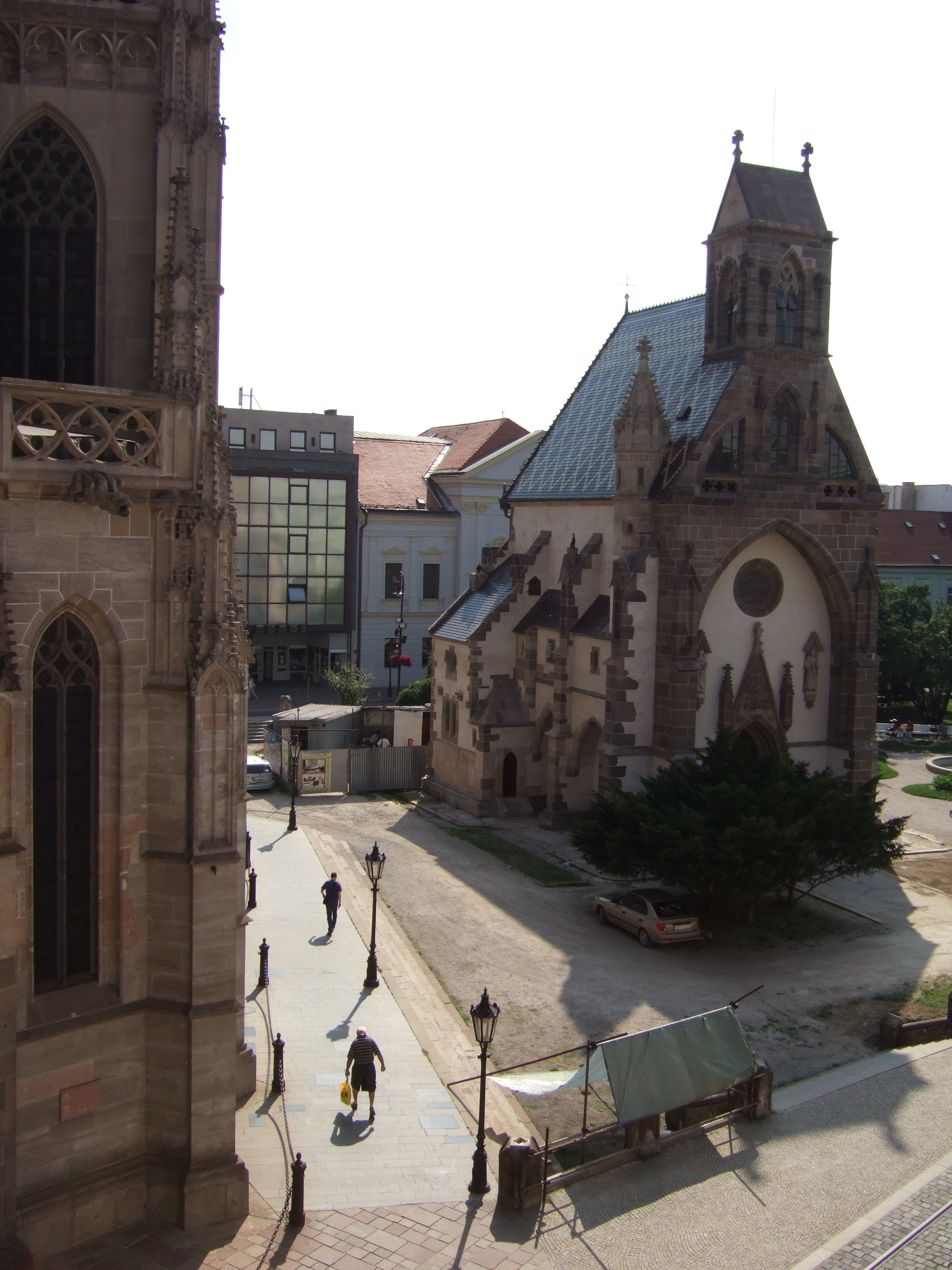

== See also ==
- Košice
