= Maddalena Buonsignori =

14th-century law professor

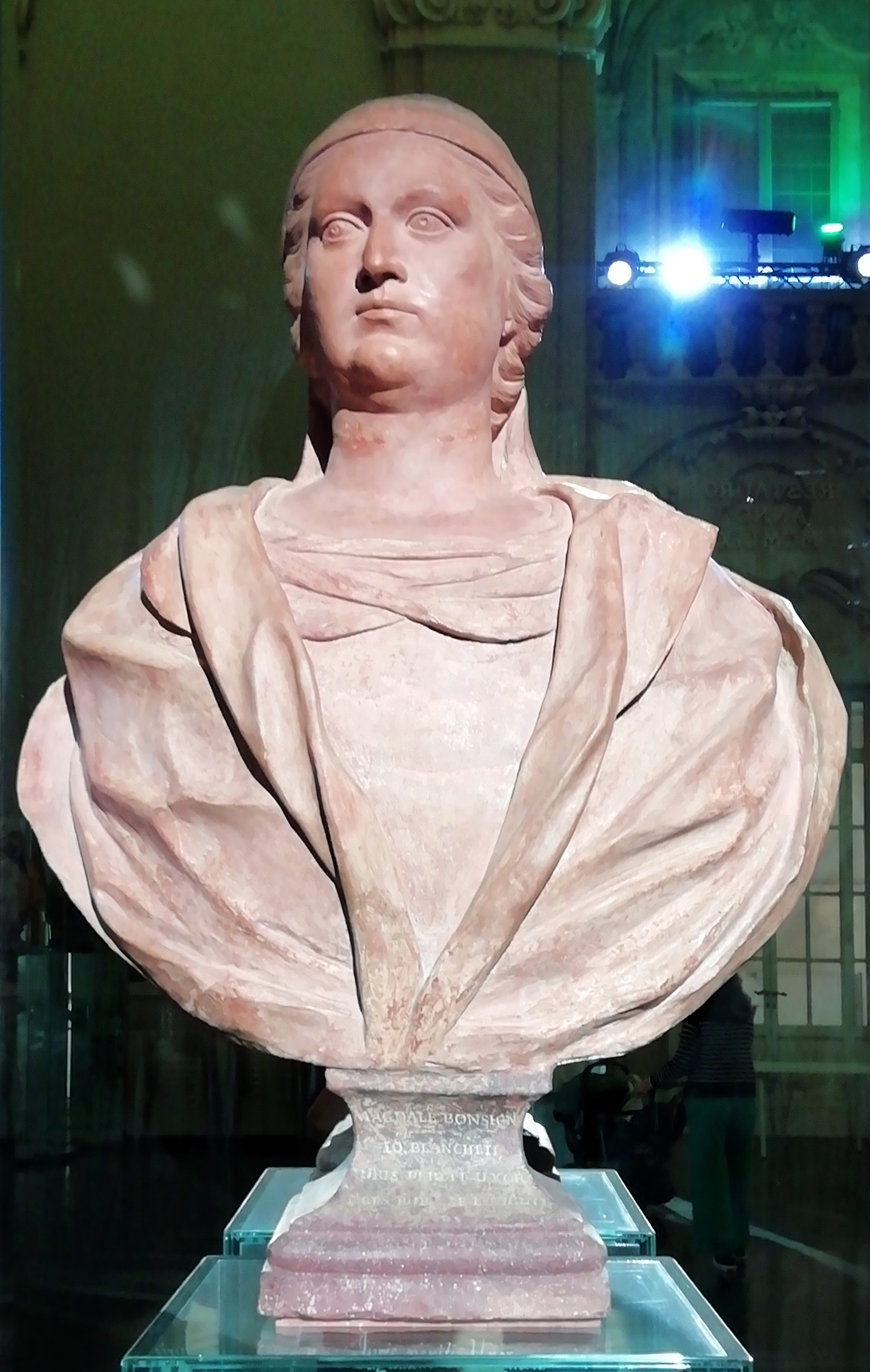

Maddalena Buonsignori (died 1396), was an Italian law professor at the University of Bologna.

Buonsignori taught jurisprudence from 1380 until the year of her death in 1396. Around this time, other women were given similar opportunities at Bologna University, however, this opportunity was unique to the school. She wrote a Latin treatise, De Legibus Connubialibus, in which she explored the legal status of the women in her time from various points of view.

== Biography ==
According to various sources, such as Antonio Masini in his Bologna perlustrata and Ginevra Canonici Fachini, who cites Giammaria Mazzuchelli, Maddalena Buonsignori was born in Bologna and after earning a law degree, she served as a lecturer in law at the University of Bologna from 1380 until her death in 1396.

Sources identify her as the wife of Giovanni Bianchetti, also a jurist, which is why she is also known as Maddalena Bianchetti Bonsignori.

== In popular culture ==
Maddalena Buonsignori appears in the video game Tsardoms Total War mod and in the opera The Dinner Party by Judy Chicago.
