= Muhammad ibn al-Qasim al-Nuwayri al-Iskandarani =

Egyptian Muslim historian

Muḥammad ibn al-Qāsim al-Nuwayrī al-Iskandarānī al-Mālikī (fl. 1365–1373) was an Egyptian Muslim historian and native of Alexandria who wrote in the tradition of secular local historiography. He wrote a three-volume history ostensibly of the Cypriot-led crusade that sacked his city in October 1365, to which he was an eyewitness. In fact, as his contemporary Ibn Ḥajar al-ʿAsḳalānī noted, the Kitāb al-Ilmām fīmā jarat bihi ʾl-aḥkām al-maḳḍiyya fī wāḳiʿat al-Iskandariyya mostly meanders through the earlier history of the city, leaving little room for the crusade with which he begins. It includes the story of Alexander the Great and Aristotle, and even many events unrelated to the city. It was written between AH 767 (AD 1365–66) and 775 (1373–74). The dates of al-Nuwayrī's birth and death are unknown. There is a manuscript copy of al-Masʿūdī's Murūj in al-Nuwayrī's handwriting.

The Kitāb al-Ilmām was edited in six volumes by Aziz Atiya between 1968 and 1973. Atiya regards al-Nuwayrī as the most important historian for the crusade of 1365 from the Egyptian perspective.

== Bibliography ==
- Atiya, Aziz Suryal (1977). A Fourteenth-Century Encyclopedist from Alexandria: A Critical and Analytical Study of al-Nuwairy al-Iskandarāni's "Kitāb al-Ilmām". Middle East Center, University of Utah.
- Bosworth, C. E. (1995). "al-Nuwayrī, Muḥammad b. al-Ḳāsim". In Bosworth, C. E.; van Donzel, E.; Heinrichs, W. P. & Lecomte, G. (eds.). The Encyclopaedia of Islam, Second Edition. Volume VIII: Ned–Sam. Leiden: E. J. Brill. p. 155. ISBN 978-90-04-09834-3.
- Rosenthal, Franz (1968). A History of Muslim Historiography (2nd ed.). E. J. Brill.
- Van Steenbergen, Jo (2003). "The Alexandrian Crusade (1365) and the Mamlūk Sources: Reassessment of the Kitāb al-Ilmām of an-Nuwayrī al-Iskandarānī (d. A.D. 1372)" (PDF). In K. Ciggaar; H. G. B. Teule (eds.). East and West in the Crusader States: Context – Contacts – Confrontations. Peeters. pp. 123–137. Archived from the original (PDF) on 2006-10-18.
- Wrisley, David Joseph (2012). "Historical Narration and Digression in al-Nuwairī al-Iskandarānī's Kitāb al-Ilmām". In Renate Blumenfeld-Kosinski; Kiril Petkov (eds.). Philippe de Mézières and His Age: Piety and Politics in the Fourteenth Century. Brill. pp. 451–473. doi:10.1163/9789004211445_023. ISBN 9789004211445.
