= Alexandrian Crusade =

14th-century crusade

Coordinates: 31°11′59″N 29°52′16″E

- Part of the Crusades
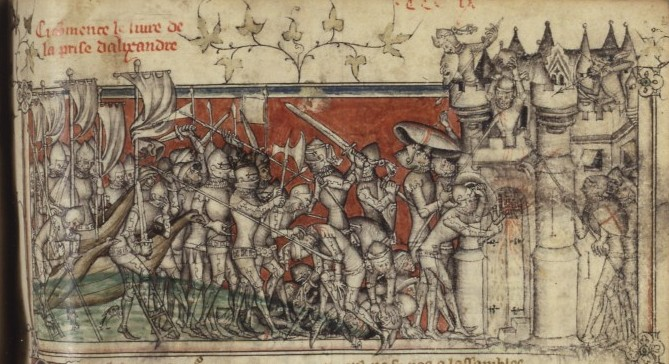
- Miniature of the sack of Alexandria (1365), Reims, from manuscript of the Prise d'Alexandrie by Guillaume de Machaut
Date	9–12 October 1365
Location	Alexandria, Mamluk Sultanate
Result	Crusader victory; Cypriots control the city for three days before abandoning it

Belligerents
Kingdom of Cyprus; Republic of Venice; Knights Hospitaller	Mamluk Sultanate

Commanders and leaders
Peter I of Cyprus; Florimont de Lesparre; Humphrey de Bohun; Robert Hales; Ferlino d 'Airasca; Stephen Scrope; Norman Leslie; Walter Leslie	Sultan Al-Ashraf Sha'ban; Emir Yalbugha al-Umari

Strength
165 ships	Unknown

Casualties and losses
Unknown	5,000 civilians enslaved; 20,000 civilians killed

The brief Alexandrian Crusade, also called the sack of Alexandria, occurred in October 1365 and was led by King Peter I of Cyprus against Alexandria in Egypt. The Crusade was sanctioned by Pope Urban V at the request of Peter I. Although often referred to as and counted among the Crusades, it was relatively devoid of religious impetus and differs from the more prominent Crusades in that it seems to have been motivated largely by economic interests.

== History ==
King Peter I of Cyprus spent three years (1362–1365), amassing an army and seeking financial support for a Crusade from the wealthiest courts of the day. In 1365, he received a papal bull sanctioning his campaign as a crusade from Pope Urban V. When he learned of a planned Egyptian attack against Cyprus, he employed the same strategy of preemptive war that had been so successful against the Turks and redirected his military ambitions against Egypt. From Venice, he arranged for his naval fleet and ground forces to assemble at the Crusader stronghold of Rhodes, where they were joined by the Knights Hospitaller.

In October 1365, Peter I set sail from Rhodes, himself commanding a sizable expeditionary force and a fleet of 165 ships, despite Venice's greater economic and political clout. Landfall was made in Alexandria around 9 October, and over the next three days, Peter's army pillaged the city killing thousands and taking 5000 people to be enslaved. Mosques, temples, churches and possibly the library also bore the brunt of the raid.

Facing an untenable position, Peter's army permanently withdrew on 12 October. Peter had wanted to stay and hold the city and use it as a beachhead for more crusades into Egypt, but the majority of his barons refused, wishing only to leave with their loot. Peter himself was one of the last to leave the city, only getting onto his ship when Mamluk soldiers entered the city. Monarchs and barons in Europe, struck by the abandonment of the city, referred to Peter as the only good and brave Christian to have crusaded in Alexandria.

The attack is mentioned in line 51 of the Prologue to The Canterbury Tales, noting that the Knight participated.

== Aftermath ==
The Mamluks prepared a large fleet to respond to the crusade, but in the end they only launched a small raid in 1368.

== Interpretations ==
Jo van Steenbergen, citing Peter Edbury, argues that the crusade was primarily an economic quest. Peter wanted to end the primacy of Alexandria as a port in the Eastern Mediterranean in the hope that Famagusta would then benefit from the redirected trade.

Van Steenbergen's description of contemporary Muslim accounts, such as those of al-Nuwayrī al-Iskandarānī and Alī al-Maqrīzī, indicates that the crusading force succeeded partially because of superior diversionary tactics. The Alexandrian defensive force occupied itself fighting in the area around the western harbor, while the "real" force, including cavalry, made landfall elsewhere in the city, apparently hiding in a graveyard, undetected by the defenders. The crusading force was thus able to attack from both the front and the rear, panicking the Alexandrians, who did not recover from this setback.
