= Prise d'Alexandrie =

Start of the Prise in the manuscript BnF ff 9221 (c. 1390)

The Prise d'Alexandrie (or d'Alixandre, 'Capture of Alexandria') is a historical narrative in Old French verse composed by Guillaume de Machaut. It is essentially a biography of King Peter I of Cyprus, extolling his devotion to the Crusade. The central event of the poem is the capture of Alexandria in 1365.

The poem must have been written after the assassination of Peter on 16 January 1369. Given its length, it is likely that it was no completed before 1370 at the earliest. It was finished by 1372.

== Historical value ==
Although written when he was seventy years old, the Prise is Machaut's first attempt at history. He declares that he writes only in the pursuit of truth. He used both documents and eyewitnesses as sources. Some of the former were incorporated, as prose, into the narrative. These include a letter from Florimont de Lesparre dated 4 August 1367 challenging King Peter to a duel and Peter's letter of acceptance dated 15 September. Two eyewitnesses are identified by name, Jean de Reims and Gautier de Conflans. Although Machaut's account of Peter's birth is mythologized and his account of his death inaccurate, the bulk of the Prise is considered a reliable and useful source and is still widely cited by historians of the Kingdom of Cyprus.

On account of its historical value, the Prise was the first of Machaut's work to be studied by modern historians. It sparked a renewal of interest in Machaut's work as a whole, beginning in 1743.

== Form ==
The Prise is 8,886 lines long, excluding the prose letters. It is written in octosyllabic rhyming couplets.

== Manuscripts ==
The Prise d'Alexandrie is preserved in five manuscripts and was also found in at least one lost manuscript. Four of the five have been digitized and are online:

- Cambridge, Corpus Christi College, Parker Library, Ferrell, 1, ff. 336r–392v
- Paris, Bibliothèque nationale de France, français, 1584, ff. 309r–365r
- Paris, Bibliothèque nationale de France, français, 1585, ff. 332r–395v
- Paris, Bibliothèque nationale de France, français, 9221, ff. 213r–238r
- Paris, Bibliothèque nationale de France, français, 22546, ff. 1r–44r

== Bibliography ==
=== Editions ===
- Dzelzainis, Angela D. (1985). An Edition and Study of Guillaume de Machaut's "La Prise d'Alixandre" (Ph. D. dissertation). Cambridge University.
- Palmer, R. Barton, ed. (2002). Guillaume de Machaut: La Prise d'Alixandre (The Taking of Alexandria). Routledge.
- Shirley, Janet; Edbury, Peter W., eds. (2001). Guillaume de Machaut: The Capture of Alexandria. Ashgate.

=== Secondary literature ===
- Calin, William (1974). A Poet at the Fountain: Essays on the Narrative Verse of Guillaume de Machaut. University Press of Kentucky.
- Earp, Lawrence (2013). Guillaume de Machaut: A Guide to Research. Taylor & Francis.
- Ribémont, Bernard (2010). "Le chroniqueur, l'hagiographe et la mer: À propos de La Prise d'Alexandrie de Guillaume de Machaut". Le Moyen Age. 116 (1): 123–138. doi:10.3917/rma.161.0123.
