= She Xiang =

Yi leader (1358-1396)

She Xiang (Chinese: 奢香; pinyin: shēxiāng ) (1358-1396) was a member of the Yi people (彝). She Zi (舍兹) is her Yi (彝) name. Guizhou female Shui Xi soil department during the Ming Dynasty. She is well-respected for her accomplishments in constructing roads and bridges as well as mediating conflicts between the Yi and Han ethnic groups.

== Life ==
She Xiang was born in 1358 (the 18th year of Yuan to Zheng) in Yongning, Sichuan Province (now Gulin County, Sichuan Province). She was the daughter of the Xuanfu Department of Yongning, Sichuan Province, and the Hengshe family of the Yi people.

In 1375 (the eighth year of Hongwu in the Ming Dynasty), she wed Ai Cui (蔼翠), the leader of Shuixi Yi Mobu and pacificator from Guizhou. After they were married, She Xiang assisted her husband in handling domestic and political matters and developed into an Ai Cui moral wife. She frequently helped her husband with matters related to the Ministry of Public Affairs. As she cohabitated with her spouse, She Xiang progressively enhanced the regent director's political acumen. The man was well-known for his proficiency across several Shui West departments, adored by the clansmen, and recognized as "Tho Mu" (King chief).

Following Ai Cui's death, She Xiang took over the role of Guizhou Xuanweishi (宣慰使) because of her son's young age.

She Xiang Regency had just caught up with the Ming Dynasty and the Yuan army during the Yunnan War. Imitating his predecessors, She Xiang allowed the Ming army to set up camp in the territory of Shui Xi and actively supported the Ming army in invading Yunnan through Guizhou. At the same time, she visited the Yunnan-Guizhou border area in person by virtue of the relatives of the clans of the Yi nationality in the southwest, proclaimed great justice to the chieftains, and carried out persuasion and enlightenment so that the separatist forces lost support. The Ming army entered Yunnan smoothly and wiped out the Yuan garrison in one stroke. She Xiang has made significant contributions to maintaining the integrity of the national territory and realizing national unity.

Ma Ye（马烨）, the commander of Guizhou in the Ming Dynasty, regarded She Xiang as a "Ghost Barbarian Girl" (鬼方蛮女) out of ethnic prejudice and was jealous and dissatisfied with her. Ma Ye was arrogant and insolent and wantonly killed the Yi people. And she was forced She Xiang to pay taxes. Guizhou is suffering from a severe drought, no grain harvest, people living in extreme hardship, and tax collection is impossible. She Xiang repeatedly complained in writing, but Ma Ye took the opportunity to catch She Xiang in Guiyang and instructed the strong men to expose her body and lash her back in an attempt to provoke the Yi soldiers. She Xiang's subordinates had long hated Ma Ye. When they learned that She Xiang had been humiliated, they became even angrier and led their soldiers to gather together. The war was on the verge of eruption. She Xiang made clear to his subordinates that she was unwilling to rebel and publicly revealed Ma Ye's intention to force opposition, thereby avoiding the disaster of war that affected the people of all ethnic groups in Guizhou. In the same year, She Xiang came to the capital on the recommendation of Liu Shuzhen and reported Ma Ye's crimes to Zhu Yuanzhang. Zhu Yuanzhang wanted to get rid of Ma Ye, so he asked She Xiang, "What will you give me in return?" She replied, "I am willing to make sure that my descendants will not dare to cause trouble again." And expressed "willingness to publish mountain chisel danger, open a post road." Zhu Yuanzhang was overjoyed, awarded her the title of "Lady Shunde," rewarded her with gold, silver, and silk goods, and called Ma Ye back to Kyoto to punish him. When She Xiang returned to Guizhou, all her subordinates felt the virtue of the court.

After She Xiang returned to Guizhou, she led various tribes to set up two post roads centered on Bianqiao (now Shibing County). One goes west through Guiyang, past Wusa, and reaches Wumeng (now Zhaotong, Yunnan); One goes north through Caotang (now Weng 'an County) to Rongshan (now Meitan County). After opening the post road, She Xiang went to Jinling many times.

In 1390 (the 23rd year of Hongwu), She Xiang sent his only son, A Qi Long di(阿期陇弟), who had grown up, to study in the Imperial School of the Capital. Zhu Yuanzhang, Emperor Taizu of the Ming dynasty, told the imperial magistrate that the suitable training of A Qi Longdi would not disappoint the people who came to study far.

In 1392 (the 25th year of Hongwu), A Qi Longdi completed his study and returned. Zhu Yuanzhang gave three imperial clothes: raiding clothes, gold belts, etc. And gave the surname "An"（安）, Han name "An Di"（安的）. In October of the same year, She Xiang sent someone to bring 60 famous horses from the Shui Xi into the court to thank him. Through her diligent and precise management, the social stability, ethnic harmony, economic development, civilization, and weather in the Shui Xi are prosperous.

In 1396 (the 29th year of Hongwu ), She Xiang became ill from overwork and died. After her death, Zhu Yuanzhang sent messengers to pay tribute to her, giving her the title of "Shunde Lady."

== Evaluate ==
=== Maintain unity ===
In the power struggle between Ming and Yuan, She Xiang judged the situation, attached great importance to national unity, and insisted on not getting involved in the vortex that divided Southwest China. In the contest with Ma Ye, she endured humiliation and finally exposed Ma Ye's conspiracy. Her victory objectively played a positive and progressive role in opposing separatism, eliminating war, and safeguarding ethnic unity and national unity.

=== Open circuit and relay ===
When She Xiang was in power, she organized people of all ethnic groups in Guizhou to cut mountains and build post roads. She stipulated that "all participants will be given food rations, the whole family will be exempt from taxes, and the payment for the construction of Bridges and roads will be fully paid by the Xuanwei Prefecture of Guizhou." This has fully aroused the enthusiasm of farmers. The construction of the road connected the areas of Yun, Guizhou, Hunan, Sichuan, and Guangxi provinces, integrated the domestic post roads into the national post road network, communicated the four provinces around Guizhou, and opened up the main traffic artery. It is an unprecedented initiative in the Yi family of Shuixi and even the whole southwest region, laying a foundation for the economic development of Shuixi, which is also her outstanding contribution to the west of Shuixi.

=== Develop agriculture ===
To develop agriculture in Shuixi, She Xiang introduced a series of reforms. For agricultural reform, she adopted a policy of both soldiers and civilians. When farming is busy, the soldiers are the people; in times of leisure or war, the people are also soldiers, so both aspects were not delayed to ensure the smooth progress of agricultural production. At the same time, she also went to the Han family to ask good farmers to help the Yi people improve their farming methods.

=== Trade construction ===
Shuixi is remote, the terrain is rugged, the road is impassable, and the outside world needs to be connected, resulting in Shuixi salt being costly and people needing help eating salt. She Xiang saw the root cause of this problem, so he took measures to protect merchants and used the method of "execute one as a warning to others"(杀一儆百） to protect free trade and solve the problem of ordinary people eating salt.

After the repair of the post road, in the historical background of national unification and a hundred disasters, she set up a series of trade measures in order to develop the local economy and make the internal and external trade circulation, such as the particular trade market set up to meet the actual production and living needs of the villagers. Trade markets are divided by region to facilitate implementation and management, and rotating open-air markets are set up nearby to facilitate the daily needs of residents. These small and large commercial streets, together with regular market trade, considerably developed local trade. During this period, the post road was not only used as an official post road to pay tribute but also an important trade road to enter the southwest. The traditional products of ethnic minorities were circulated among each other, and the understanding of ethnic minorities among the Han people in the Central Plains was constantly strengthened. A large number of Han people began to come to the southwest through this route to do business, advanced Central Plains culture was also spread through this route, and various ethnic cultures were also communicated and exchanged through this route, and ethnic integration was quietly taking shape.

=== Reforming Yi（彝） script ===
In addition to the introduction of Chinese, she also remembered to develop her own national culture. She carried out effective reforms in the use and dissemination of the Yi script, which not only liberated the Yi script from mystery and made it appear on carriers such as stone on a large scale but also expanded the function of the Yi script from the traditional transmission of scriptures and history to daily affairs such as bookkeeping, contracts, recording ballads, and correspondence, promoting the wide spread of the Yi script so that a large number of Yi culture and written historical materials can be preserved.

=== Spread Confucianism ===
She was fond of reading books in her early years, especially Chinese books. She absorbed a lot of nutrients in Sinology, from which she also realized the importance of Sinology, so she wanted to open a Sinology; she thought: "The Han family Confucius and Mencius culture, can cultivate morality and moisten the body, and then nourish the world, spread the people." After taking office, She Xiang set up Confucianism and set up a professor in the Ministry of Pacification in Guizhou. In order to learn and introduce Han culture and strengthen and promote cultural exchanges between Yi and Han, she took the lead in sending her children to Imperial schools in Beijing. In her drive and influence, the Wusa, Wumeng, Mangbu, and Yongning areas of the chiefdom have sent their children to Beijing school.

== Memorialize ==
- She Xiang Museum

She Xiang Museum, a comprehensive museum of Yi （彝）history and culture named after She Xiang, was built in March 1993, completed and opened to the public in April 1994. In 1997, it was named "Guizhou Patriotic Education Base" （贵州省爱国主义教育基地）, and in 2006, it was named "National National Unity and Progress Education Base"（ 全国民族团结进步教育基地 ）. The museum, modeled after the ancient Yi （彝）Tuosi manor building, covers an area of 20,666 square meters and a construction area of 1,380 square meters, consisting of five exhibition halls, a data center, and a collection of calligraphy work exhibition hall.

- She Xiang Park

She Xiang Park is located in Luzhou City（泸州市）. The 22-meter-high She Xiang sculpture stands on the platform at the park's highest point. It is a comprehensive park that integrates human and regional cultural characteristics, ecology, landscape, health, entertainment, and rest.

- Tomb of She Xiang

She Xiang Tomb is located in the north of Dafang County, Guizhou Province, under the Yunlong Mountain, Wulong Potou Ximatang, and is a national critical protection of cultural relics.

In 1396 (the 29th year of Ming Hongwu), She Xiang died of illness; Zhu Yuanzhang sent people to pay tribute and honored her with the posthumous title of "Lady of the Great Ming Shunde"（ 大明顺德夫人 ）, her tomb was built according to the specifications of the three products, and "Lady of the Ming Shunde She Xiang Tomb"（明顺德夫人奢香墓） was engraved on the tombstone. In the early years of Kangxi in the Qing Dynasty, when Wu Sangui, king of Pingxi, led his troops to "Pacify Nanman" （平南蛮）and "Suppress Shuixi"（剿水西）, She Xiang Tomb and ancillary facilities were destroyed. In 1833 (the 13th year of Daoguang in the Qing Dynasty), An Ganxin(安淦辛）, the descendant of She Xiang, requested for repair, which was later presided over by the Governor of Dading and the governor of Qianxi and carried out some repairs. In 1949, only Qing Dynasty stone tombs and cover tablets were left in the weeds. In 1964, the People's Government of Guizhou Province listed the She Xiang Tomb as a provincial cultural relic protection unit—with initial restoration in 1979. In 1985, the State Administration of Cultural Heritage, Guizhou Provincial Department of Culture, and local cultural relics departments at all levels jointly funded the restoration of the She Xiang tomb with reference to historical records and combined with the style of the Yi custom tomb construction at that time. In 1988, The State Council approved it as a national key cultural relic protection unit.

- She Xiang plaza

In order to express the memory and reverence for this outstanding woman, in 2008, Gulin County built Gulin She Xiang Incense Square on the occasion of the centennial county celebration.

== Cultural image ==
Year	English title	Chinese title	Actor	Chinese name	Notes
1985	Excessive Sweet Lady	奢香夫人	Hurxida Turdi	胡尔西德图尔地	
2011	Excessive Sweet Lady	奢香夫人	Ning Jing	宁静	
2017	Twenty degrees north latitude	北纬二十八度	Rain Li	李彩桦	
