= Coat of arms of Košice =

Versions
- Armiger: City of Košice
- Adopted: 1369

Košice (today in Slovakia; previously part of the Kingdom of Hungary, Kassa in Hungarian, Cassovia in Latin) was the first town in Europe to be granted its own coat of arms. It was granted by King Louis I the Great at the Castle of Diósgyőr near present-day Miskolc in 1369. By the year 1502 it had obtained all together four heraldic warrants from four monarchs. The coat of arms used today is virtually unchanged since 1502.

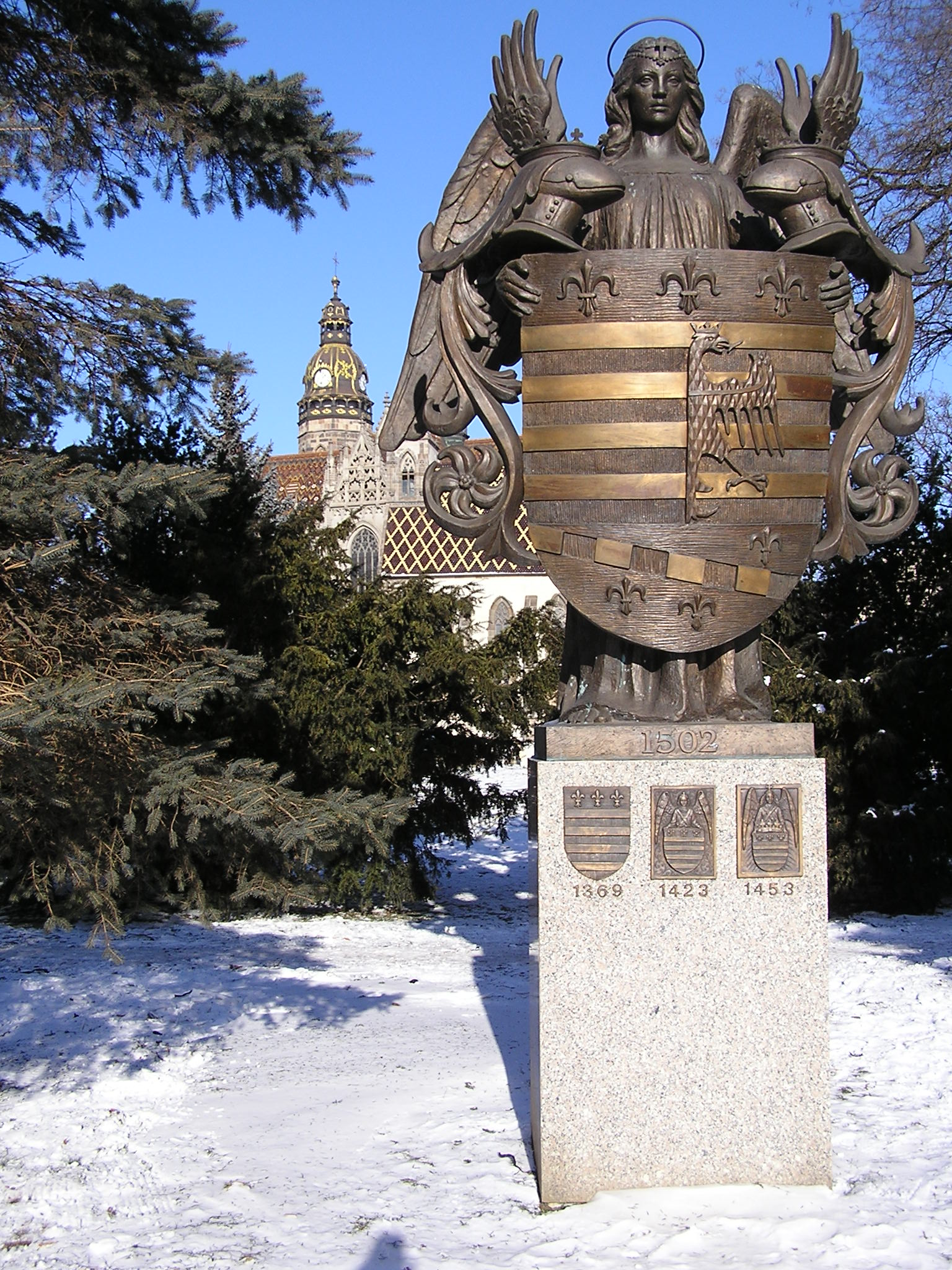
Statue of the municipal coat of arms

The original coat of arms featured only the red and silver stripes and three fleur-de-lis on a blue background.

The four red stripes in the coat of arms of Košice come from the medieval coat of arms of the Hungarian Árpád dynasty. The three golden fleurs-de-lis on an azure field refer to the Capetian House of Anjou dynasty, and the silver eagle to the Jagiellon dynasty.

A statue of the municipal coat of arms (the work of Slovak sculptor Arpád Račko) was inaugurated in December 2002 at Hlavná ulica (Main Street).

== Gallery ==
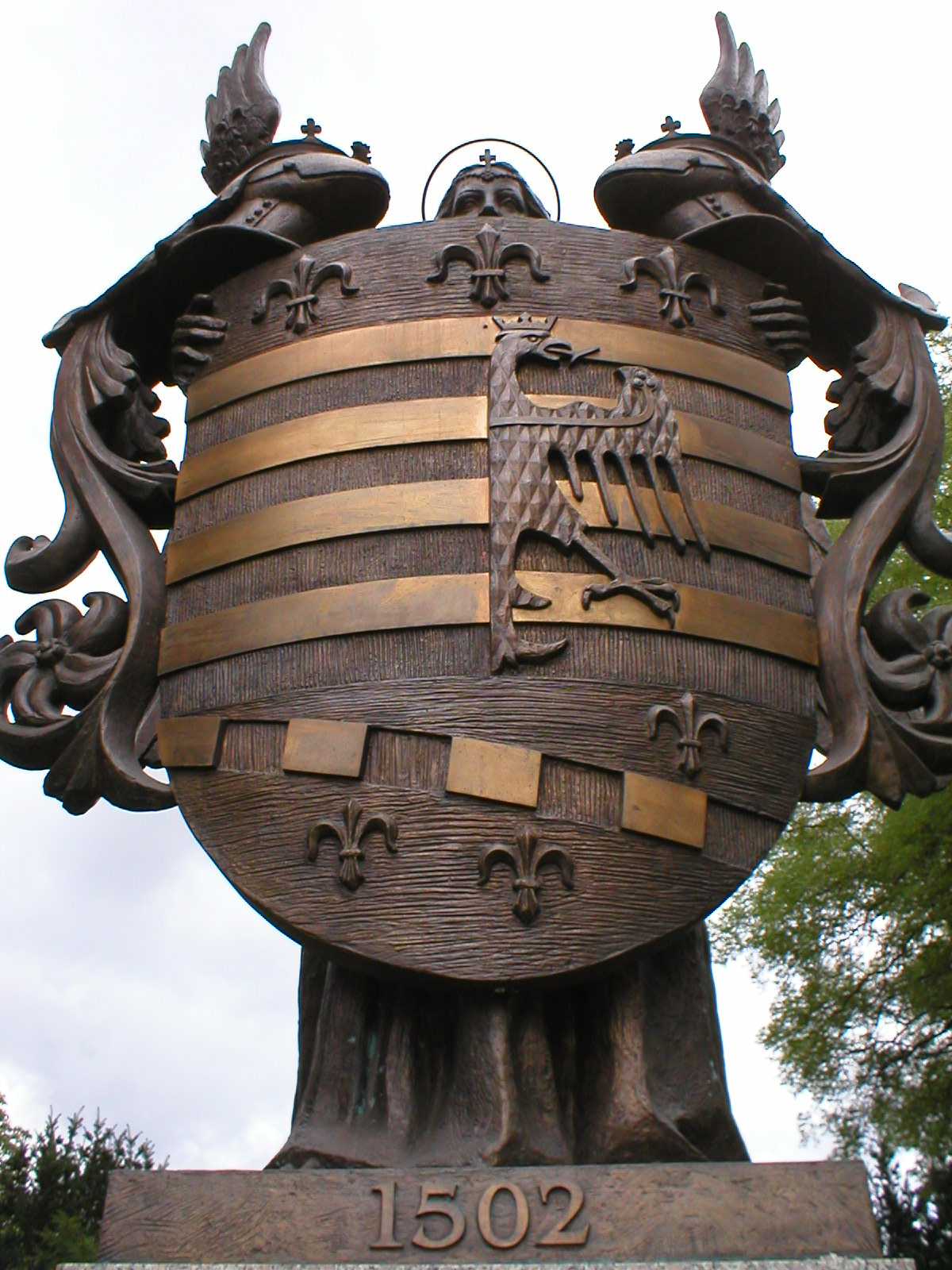

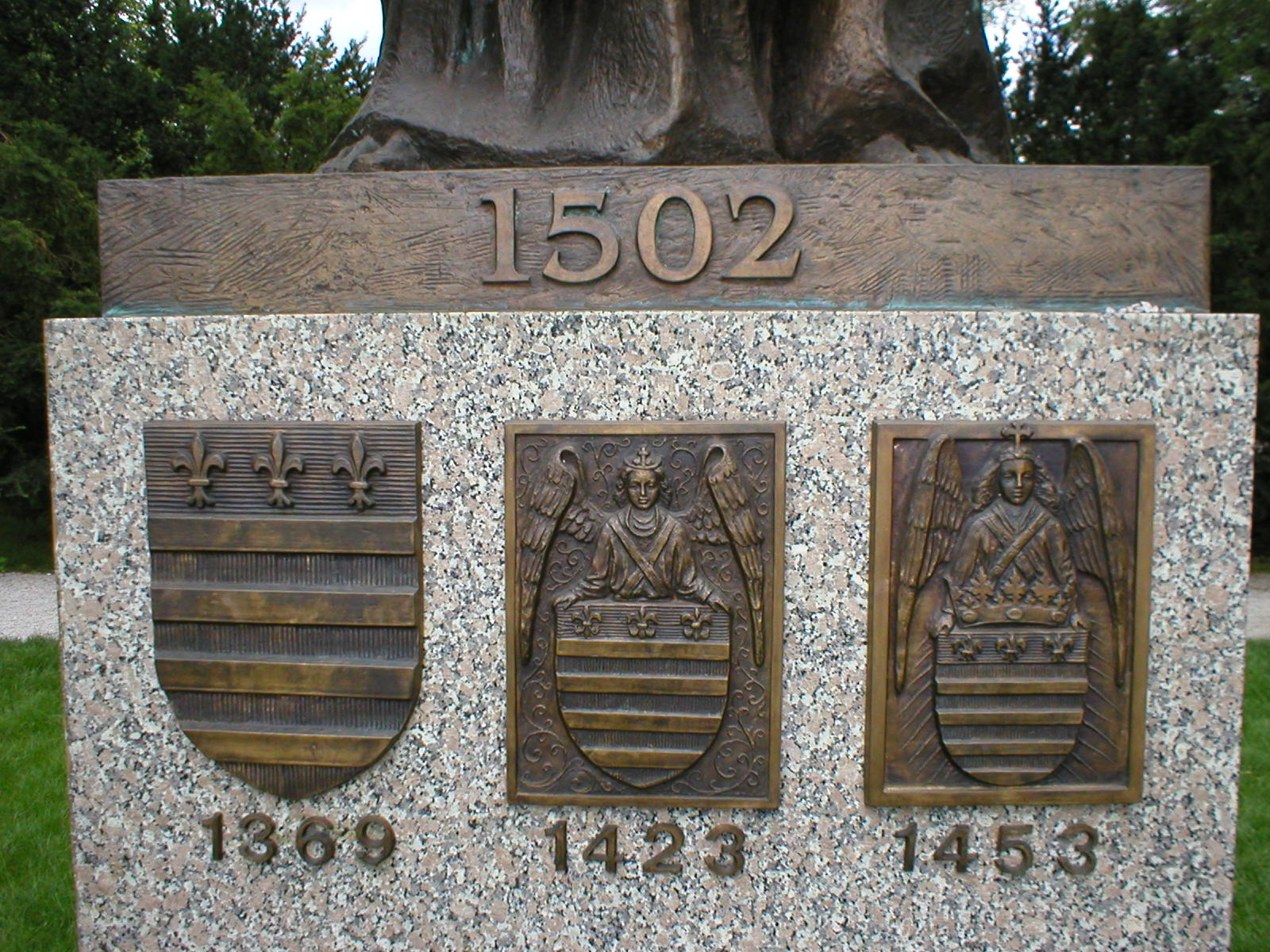

== See also ==
- Waxworks museum of the Castle of Diósgyőr
