= Tallaght =

Outer suburb of Dublin, Ireland

Tallaght Tamhlacht (Irish)
- Suburban town
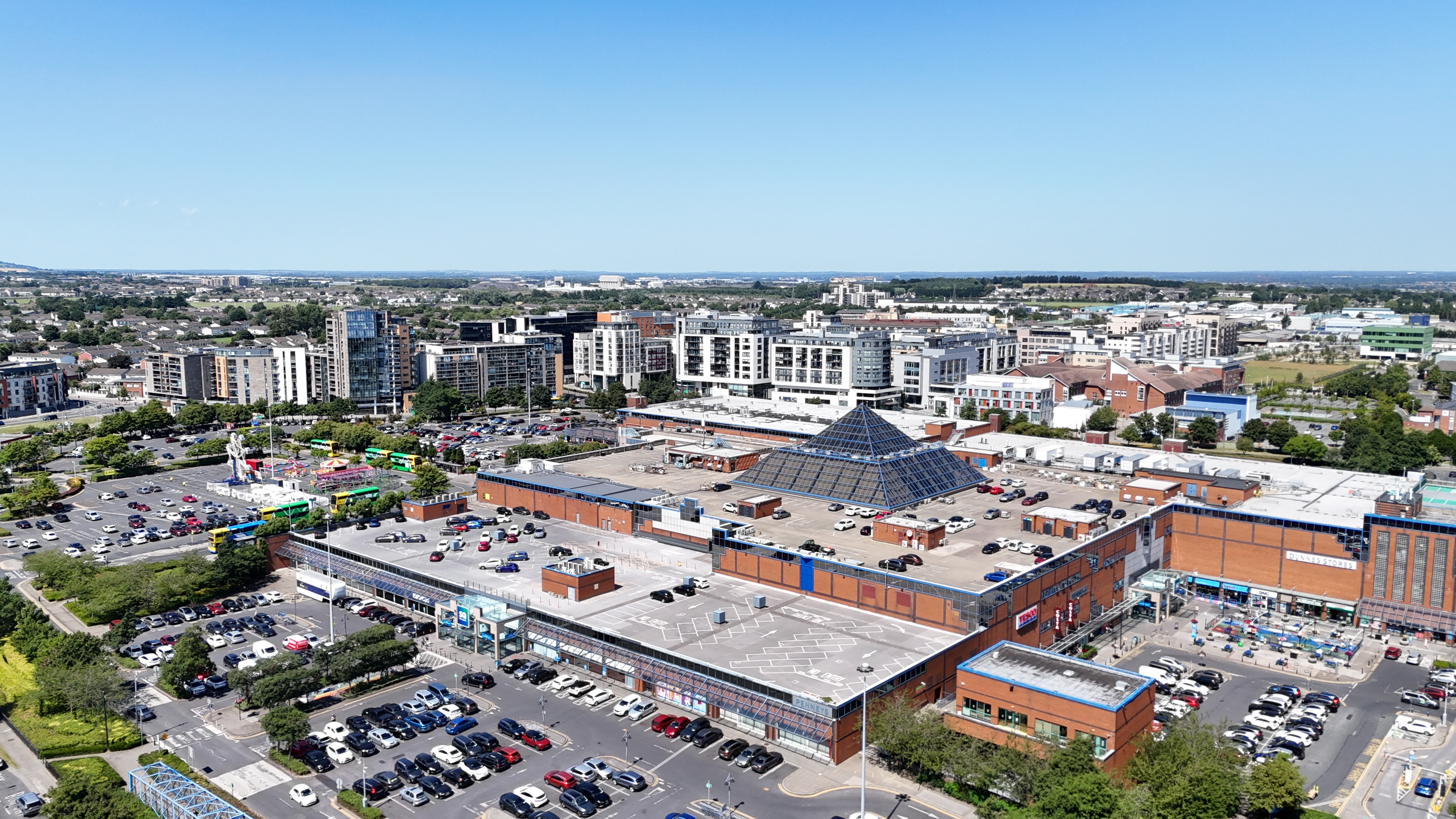
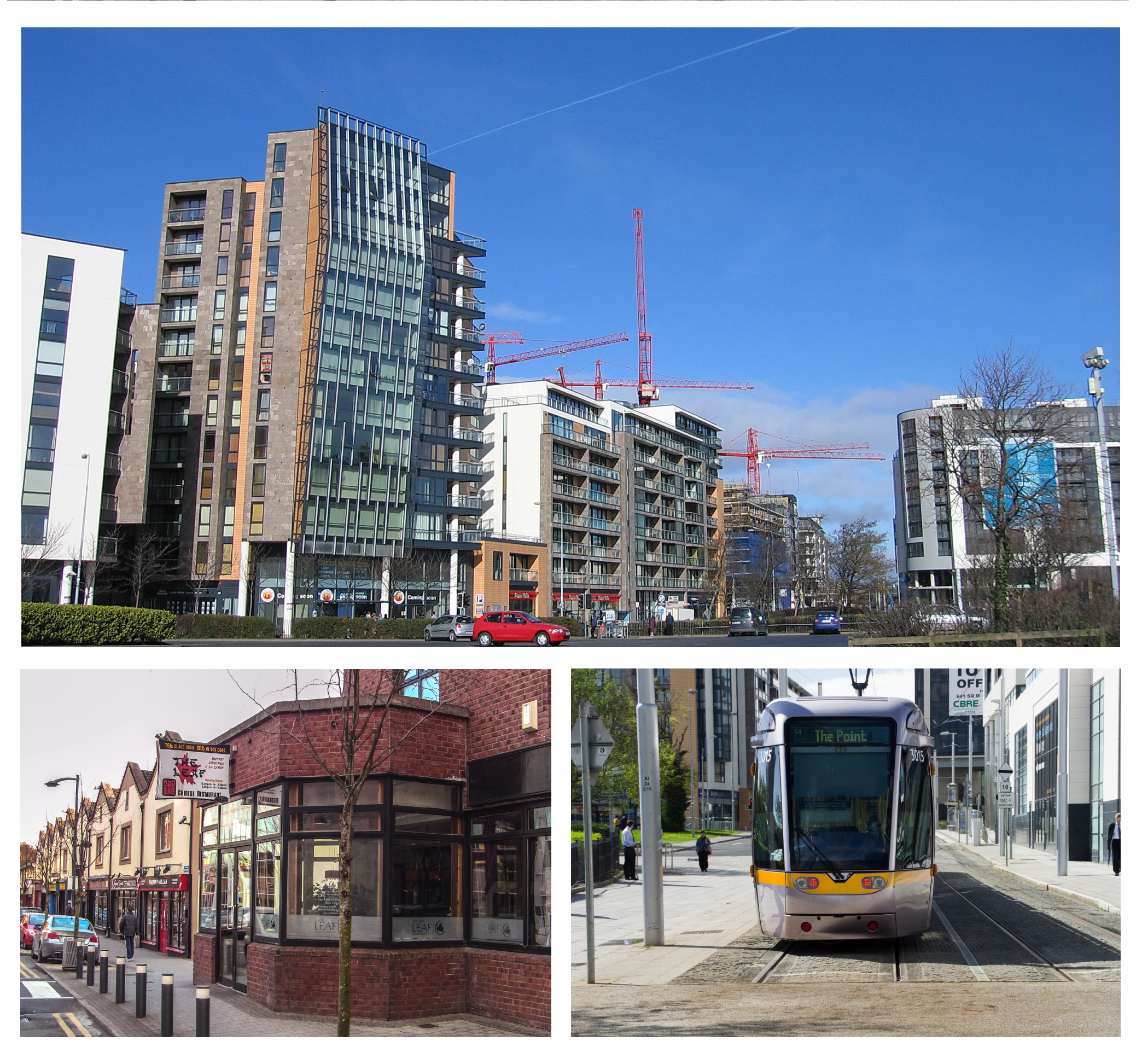
- From top, left to right: Aerial view of Tallaght, Skyline from Sean Walsh Park, High Street, Luas terminus; The Square Tallaght
- Motto: Aontacht (Irish: Unity)
- Location within Greater Dublin, Ireland Tallaght (Ireland)
- Coordinates: 53.2886°N 6.3572°W
- Country: Ireland
- Province: Leinster
- County: County Dublin
- Local government area: South Dublin

Government
  - Dáil constituency: Dublin South-West
- Elevation: 90 m (300 ft)

Population (2022 census)
  - Total: 81,022
- Time zone: UTC±0 (WET)
  - Summer (DST): UTC+1 (IST)
- Eircode routing key: D24
- Telephone area code: +353 (0)1
- Irish Grid Reference: O093265

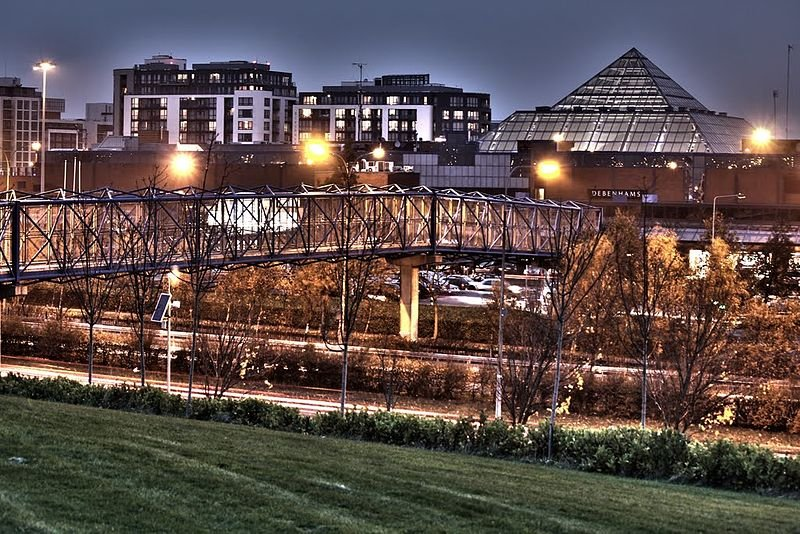
Skyline of Central Tallaght

Tallaght (/ˈtælə/ TAL-ə; Irish: Tamhlacht, IPA: [ˈt̪ˠəul̪ˠəxt̪ˠ]) is a southwestern outer suburb on the southside of Dublin, Ireland, and is the county town of South Dublin. Tallaght was the site of a monastic settlement from at least the 8th century, which became one of medieval Ireland's more important monastic centres.

Up to the 1960s, Tallaght was a small village in County Dublin, linked to several nearby rural areas which were part of the large civil parish of the same name—the local council estimates the population then to be 2,500. Suburban development began in the 1970s and a "town centre" area has been developing since the late 1980s. There is no legal definition of the boundaries of Tallaght, but the 13 electoral divisions known as "Tallaght" followed by the name of a locality have, according to the 2022 census, a population of 81,022, up from 76,119 over six years. This makes Tallaght the largest settlement on the island without city status, though there have been calls for it to be declared one.

The village core of the district is located north of, and near to, the River Dodder, and parts of the broader area within South Dublin are close to the borders of the local authority areas of Dublin City Council and Dún Laoghaire-Rathdown County Council, and close to the borders of County Kildare and County Wicklow. Several streams flow through the area, notably the Jobstown or Tallaght Stream (a tributary of the Dodder), and the Fettercairn Stream (a tributary of the River Camac), while the Tymon River, the main component of the River Poddle (Liffey tributary), rises in Cookstown, near Fettercairn.

Tallaght is also the name of an extensive civil parish, which includes other areas of southern and southwestern Dublin, from Templeogue to Ballinascorney in the mountains. A book about the civil parish was published in the 19th century, The History and Antiquities of Tallaght in the County of Dublin, written by William Domville Handcock.

== Etymology ==
The place-name Tallaght is said to derive from támh-leacht, meaning "plague pit" in Irish, and consisting of "támh", meaning plague, and "leacht", meaning grave or memorial stone. The earliest mention of a Tallaght is in Lebor Gabála Érenn ("The Book Of Invasions"), and is there linked to Parthalón, said to be the leader of an early invasion of Ireland. He and many of his followers (9000) were said to have died of the plague. The burials that have been found in the Tallaght area, however, are all normal pre-historic interments, mainly from the Bronze Age, and no evidence of a mass grave has been recorded. The Annals of the Four Masters record the legendary event as follows:

"Naoi mile do ecc fri h-aoin-sechtmain do muinter Parthaloin for Shenmhaigh Ealta Eadoir .i. cúig míle d'feroibh, & ceithre míle do mnáibh. Conadh de sin ata Taimhleacht Muintere Parthalain. Trí ced bliadhain ro caithsiot i n-Erinn."

In translation:

"Nine thousand of Parthalón's people died in one week on Sean Mhagh Ealta Edair, namely, five thousand men, and four thousand women. Whence is named Taimhleacht Muintire Parthalóin. They had passed three hundred years in Ireland."

The name in Irish, Tamhlacht, is found at other places, such as Tamlaght in Magherafelt District, Northern Ireland, though the mention of Eadoir, probably Binn Éadair (Howth) in the passage below, suggests that Tallaght is the more likely location for this tale.

Places near Tallaght featured in the ancient legends of the Fianna, a band of warriors that roamed the country and fought for the High King at Tara. In Lady Gregory's Gods and Fighting Men, mention is made of, in particular, Gleann na Smól: in Chapter 12 "The Red Woman", on a misty morning, Fionn says to his Fians, "Make yourselves ready, and we will go hunting to Gleann-na-Smol". There they meet Niamh of the Golden Hair, who chose Oisín from among all the Fianna to be her husband, told him to come with her on her fairy horse, after which they rode over the land to the sea and across the waves to the land of Tír na nÓg.

== History ==
=== 8th to 12th centuries ===
The monastery of Tallaght by St. Maelruain in 769 and was a centre of learning and piety, associated with the Céli Dé spiritual reform movement. This and the monastery at Finglas were known as the "two eyes of Ireland". St. Aengus was one of the most notable of the Céli Dé and was devoted to the religious life. A band of followers accompanied him at all time, distracting him from his devotions. In secret, he travelled to the monastery at Tallaght where he was unknown and joined as a lay brother, remaining there many years until Maeilruain uncovered his identity. They may have written the Martyrology of Tallaght together, and St Aengus also wrote a calendar of saints known as the Félire Óengusso ("Martyrology of Aengus"). St. Maelruain died on 7 July 792 and was buried in Tallaght. The influence of the monastery continued after his death, evidenced by the ability of the monks of Tallaght to prevent the holding of the Tailteann Games in 806, owing to some infringement of their rights.

The monastery was raided by the Vikings in 811, but not destroyed, and the annals of the monastery continued to be recorded for several 100 years after. Following the Anglo-Norman invasion in 1179, Tallaght and its appurtenances became part of the Diocese of Dublin and the property of the Archbishop. No trace of the monastic settlement remains today.

=== 13th to 20th centuries ===
Throughout most of the 13th century Tallaght existed in a state of relative peace, until the O'Byrnes and O'Tooles, joined by many of the Archbishop's tenants, took "offensive action". This resulted in the land was not being cultivated, the pastures were not used by livestock and the holdings were deserted. The bailiffs of Tallaght received a royal grant to enclose the town of Tallaght in 1310. There are no traces of the defensive structures now, and their exact location is unknown apart from the name of the Watergate Bridge spanning the Dodder on the Oldbawn Road. In 1324, the construction of Tallaght Castle began, and it was finished sometime before 1349. It was reported as being in need of repair a century later.

The 17th and 18th centuries brought many changes to Tallaght. Many mills were built along the Dodder and this brought new prosperity to the broad area, which saw the building of many houses.

When Archbishop Hoadly replaced Archbishop King in 1729 he found the castle in ruins and had it demolished, building himself a palace at a cost of £2,500. By 1821 the palace too had fallen into ruin and an Act of Parliament was passed which stated that it was unfit for habitation. The following year it was sold to Major Palmer, Inspector General of Prisons, who pulled the palace down and used the materials to build his mansion, Tallaght House, as well as a schoolhouse and several cottages. Parts of Tallaght House, including one tower, were incorporated into St Joseph's Retreat House, situated on the grounds of St Mary's Priory; the rest was demolished. That tower contains a spiral staircase and was originally four storeys high but is now reduced internally to two. Attached to the castle was a long building that was used in the archbishop's time as a brewery and later as a granary and stables. When the Dominicans came, it was converted into a chapel and was used as such until 1883, when the new church dedicated to Fr Tom Burke (now the older part of the parish church) was built.

The Dominicans came to Tallaght in 1842 and soon established a priory that was also a seminary for the formation of Dominicans in Ireland and on missions in Trinidad and Tobago, South America, Australia, India, and elsewhere. The cramped accommodation of Tallaght house was replaced by the austere priory in phases of 1864, 1903 and 1957. The work that goes on in these buildings is varied: St Joseph's retreat house, the Tallaght parish, St Catherine's counselling centre, at least two publishing enterprises, individual writing and international research in several domains.

The grounds of the Priory, the old palace gardens, still retain older features such as the Archbishop's bathhouse, the Friar's Walk and Saint Maelruain's Tree, an 18th-century Persian walnut.

Along an old road from Clondalkin to Tallaght were the Commons of Tallaght, an area which had been enclosed in 1829. On these commons, horse races were frequently held until the mid to late 1800s.

The old constabulary barracks on the main street were the scene of the engagement known as the 'Battle of Tallaght', which occurred during the Fenian Rising on 5 March 1867. On that night the Fenians moved out to assemble at the appointed place on Tallaght Hill. The large number of armed men alarmed the police in Tallaght who sent a warning to the nearest barracks. There were fourteen constables and a head constable under Sub-inspector Burke at Tallaght, and they took up a position outside the barracks where they commanded the roads from both Greenhills and Templeogue. The first body of armed men came from Greenhills and, when they came under police fire, retreated. Next, a party came from Templeogue and was also dispersed. In 1936 a skeleton, sword-bayonet and water bottle were found in a hollow tree stump near Terenure. It is thought that these were the remains of one of the Fenians who had taken refuge there after the Battle of Tallaght and either died of his wounds or was frozen to death.

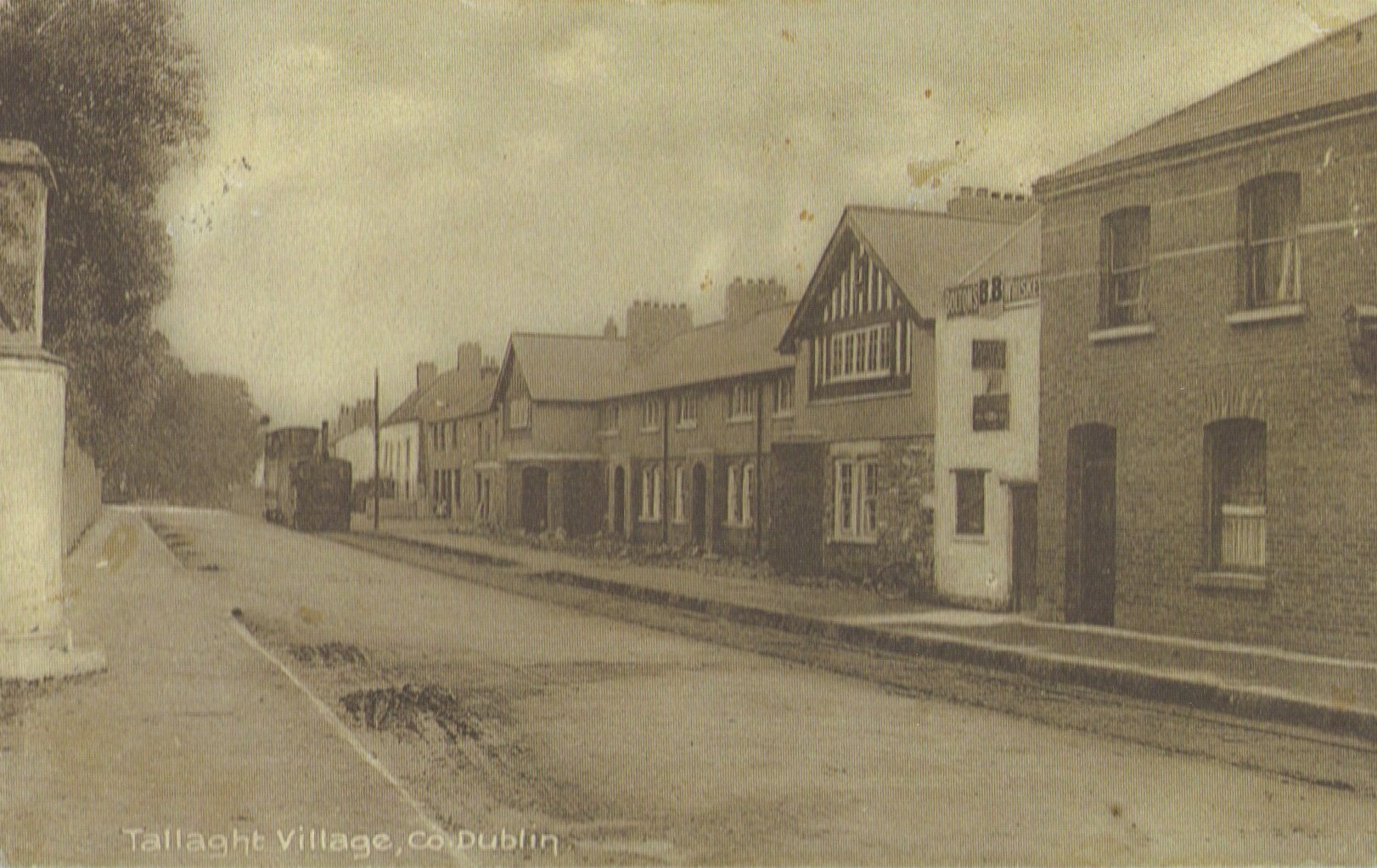
The Dublin-Blessington/Poulaphuca steam tram and the village c. 1907

In 1888, the Dublin and Blessington Steam Tramway opened and it passed through Tallaght Village. This provided a new means of transporting goods and also brought day-trippers from the city.

=== Modern development ===
In 1821, the population of the civil parish of Tallaght was 4,348. By 1961, more than a century later, it had remained practically static at 4,565 people.

While no plan was formally adopted, Tallaght was laid out as a new town, following proposals in The Dublin Region: Advisory Plan and Final Report by Myles Wright, Professor of Planning at the University of Liverpool, published in 1968. Erika Hanna, a historian specialising in modern Irish social history, writes:

As the road network (of Dublin) would not take much more traffic, he (Wright) proposed a radical remodelling of the land use and social composition of the region to create a diffuse city more suited to the demands of the car. He therefore recommended the decentralization of much industry, commerce and population to new centres at locations removed from the city centre. Published in full in 1968, this report went on to be the most influential document in shaping Dublin's development until the end of the twentieth century, presaging the growth of Dublin's western suburbs and an urban transport structure based primarily on private car ownership.

The plan, also known as the Myles Wright Masterplan, proposed four self-contained "new towns" for Greater Dublin – at Tallaght, Clondalkin, Lucan and Blanchardstown – all of which were, at that time, villages surrounded by extensive open lands, with some small settlements. Many of the social and cultural proposals in this plan were ignored by the Dublin local authorities, and contrary to planners' suggestions, Tallaght and the other "new towns" were not provided with adequate facilities. Characterised by the same problems associated with poorly planned fringe areas of many European cities, during the 1970s and 1980s Tallaght became synonymous with suburban mismanagement.

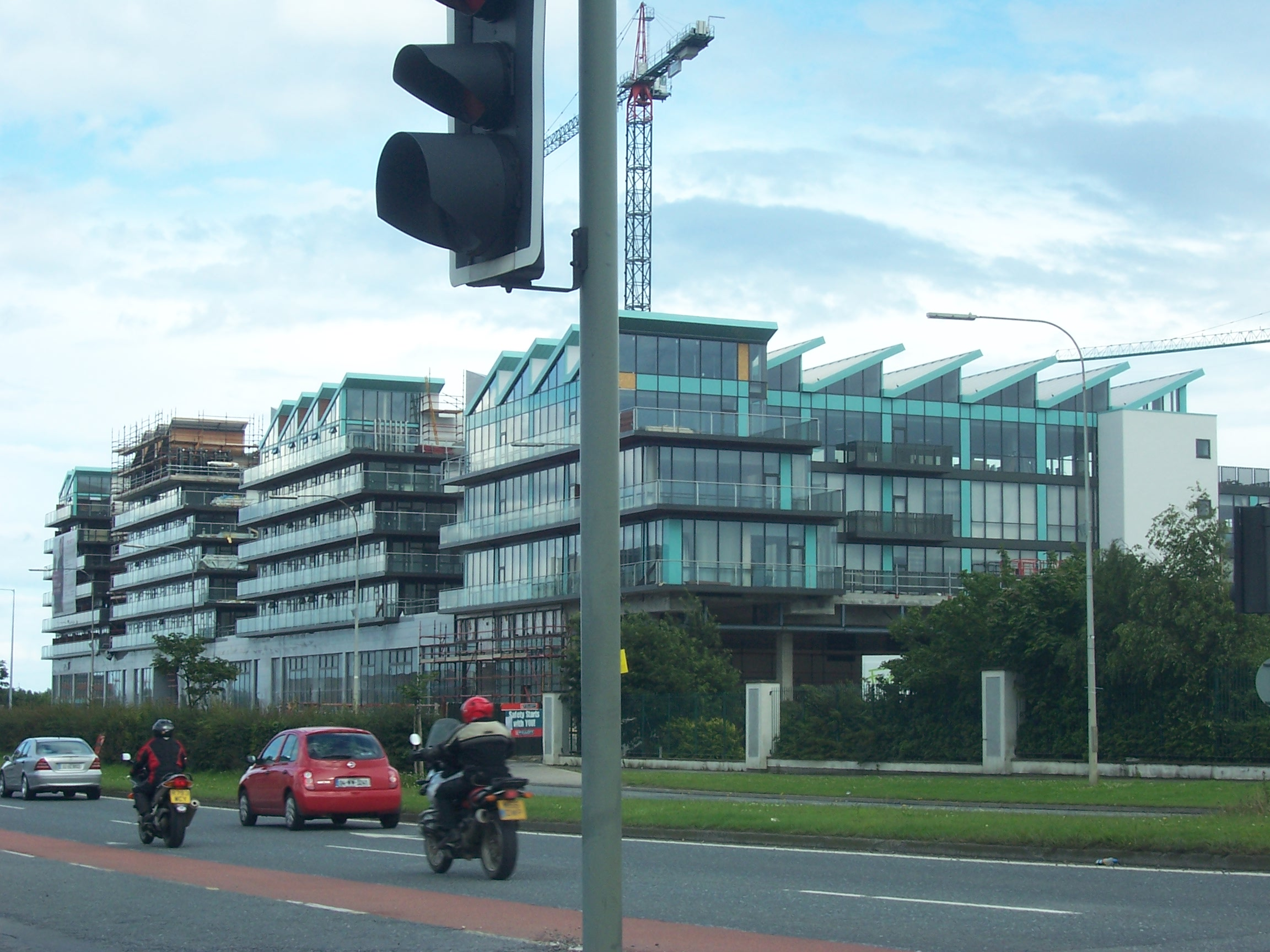
Arena Buildings

The development of high-density housing in Tallaght began about 1969, and by 1996 had become Dublin's largest suburb with a population of 85,000, with many residents having been prompted to move to Tallaght from substandard or overcrowded conditions in inner-city areas of Dublin, whilst others moved to Dublin from rural parts of Ireland in search of better opportunities. In a Dáil Éireann debate in May 1996, it was noted that "Tallaght (was comparable with) the size of Limerick — 97,000 people live there". (See: List of urban areas in the Republic of Ireland)

In January 1985, the Community Training and Employment Consortium (COMTEC) was established in Tallaght by the Youth Employment Agency, with its objective being to "to bring together and coordinate the work of manpower and education agencies in the area, and to promote community involvement in local provision of manpower services." In 1988, architect and town planner Patrick Shaffrey commented:

Tallaght, the first major development area to the west, has now a population of 90,000, but still lacks a town centre, and the usual social community facilities associated with an urban entity of that size. The improvement of Tallaght and the other major development areas will be among the great challenges in the foreseeable future.

The lack of amenities or job prospects in Tallaght afforded to the sudden influx of newcomers was still being felt into the early 1990s, with people complaining of isolation, in an area that felt like it was composed solely of 'the houses and the mountains' according to one resident. John Reid, a staff member at Tallaght Community Workshops, spoke in 1992 of the failures of planners as he saw it:

I believe the Government is certainly responsible for some of the things that have happened, particularly in west Tallaght. They've created ghettos, in that all the unemployed people are in the one area, because about five years ago the Government offered a IR£5,000 grant for people to give up their County Council or Corporation houses (in Tallaght), and move to a private housing estate, with the result that all the people that couldn't afford to do that, such as the unemployed people, are all stuck together in the one area. And everything is doom and gloom then, because there's no jobs to look forward to, there's no neighbours to look at to say 'Well they have a job, now if they have a job, I can go out and get meself a job'.

Peggy Towers of Killinarden Community Centre, speaking in 1992, noted that the community "definitely needed more employment" as around "50 to 60% of men in Killinarden" were unemployed and "an awful lot of children that are over the age of 18 are unemployed as well". Secondary school students interviewed at the same time noted that some employers were discriminating against potential candidates from Tallaght as the area had a negative reputation, which further limited their job prospects.

Brian Hayes, a Fine Gael politician, noted in Dáil Éireann in 1996 that the "Kiltalown site in west Tallaght takes up 20 acres. Most of the area has unemployment rates of 80 per cent, there are connected large-scale problems and the social amenities are minimal." Tallaght Rehabilitation Project, a local drug and alcohol rehabilitation service was set up in 1997, initiated by the Tallaght Drugs Taskforce, in an effort to support local Tallaght residents suffering from drug addiction. The organisation have used Kiltalown House near Jobstown as their headquarters since July 2005.

While it was absorbed into the larger suburban area of Dublin (including being included in the postal district Dublin 24 in the 1980s), Tallaght has developed a distinctive identity, arising largely from its rapid growth during recent decades, and now has active local arts, cultural, sports, and economic scene.

Tallaght's Civic Square contains the seat of the local authority, County Hall, a modern and well-equipped library facility, a theatre building and a "cutting edge" 4-storey arts centre named "Rua Red" (which opened on 5 February 2009). This facility offers activities in the areas of music, dancing, art, drama and literature. Along with other local libraries and arts groups, it also has another theatre building and a homegrown youth theatre company. It is also the home to the Tallaght Swim Team, Tallaght Rugby Club, the National Basketball Arena, Shamrock Rovers F.C., and several martial arts schools and Gaelic Athletic Association clubs.

=== Chronology ===
- 769: Saint Maelruain's monastery founded.
- 792: AI792.1 Kl. Mael Rúain, bishop of Tamlachta, [rested].
- 811: Saint Maelruain's monastery was devastated by the Vikings.
- 824: Tamlachta of Mael Ruain plundered by the community of Cell Dara.
- 1179: Tallaght and its hinterland, previously within the Diocese of Glendalough, were confirmed as holdings of the Archdiocese of Dublin.
- 1310: bailiffs of Tallaght given royal grant to enclose the town.
- 1324: Alexander de Bicknor begins the building of Tallaght Castle.
- 1331-1332; Tallaght Castle plundered by O'Toole of Imaile.
- 1378: Mathew, son of Redmond de Bermingham, takes up station at Tallaght Castle to resist the O'Byrnes.
- 1540: O'Tooles invade, and devastate Tallaght Castle and surrounding manors.
- 1635: Old Bawn House was built.
- 1729: Tallaght Castle demolished; Archbishop's Palace built by Archbishop Hoadley.
- 1822: Archbishop's Palace was demolished by Major Palmer, who then builds Tallaght House.
- 1829: Modern Church of Ireland parish created.
- 1856: Tallaght House is sold to the Dominicans.
- 1864: Saint Mary's Priory was built.
- 1867: Battle of Tallaght fought in March. 2 July 1882, Tom Bourke O.P. dies.
- 1883: New Priory Church built.
- 1888: The Dublin and Blessington Steam Tramway commences operation, passing through Tallaght village.
- 1903: New wing was built at the Priory, connecting Priory and the church
- 1955: New retreat house built at the Priory, enclosing Tallaght House.
- 1955: Michael Cardinal Browne buried in Tallaght Dominican church
- 1984: Public library, at Castletymon, opened in June.
- 1987: Alan Dukes outlines the Tallaght Strategy to the Tallaght Chamber of Commerce.
- 1990: The Square shopping centre opens.
- 1992: Institute of Technology, Tallaght opens.
- 1994: South Dublin County Council comes into existence, with new headquarters at Tallaght; Tallaght Youth Theatre is founded; Tallaght's second public library, situated beside the South Dublin County Council offices, opened in December.
- 1997: Tallaght Theatre is officially opened, on Greenhill's Road in Kilnamanagh.
- 1998: Tallaght Hospital opens.
- 1999: Civic Theatre opens adjacent to County Council headquarters in Tallaght centre.
- 2004: The Red Line of the Luas light rail system opens, connecting central Tallaght to Heuston Station and Connolly Station in Dublin City.
- 2008: Extensive rebuilding of Tallaght's main library is completed.
- 2009: The County Arts Centre, Rua Red, is opened; completion of Tallaght Stadium.
- 2011: On 15 September Shamrock Rovers hosted Rubin Kazan in what was the first UEFA Europa League group stage game to contain an Irish team. This game took place in the Tallaght Stadium which would host 2 more games in the group stage.

== Geography ==
=== Location ===
Tallaght is centred 13 km (8 miles) southwest of Dublin city, near the foothills of the Wicklow Mountains. While there is no formal definition as such, it can be described as beginning southwest of Templeogue, running west towards Saggart, southwest towards the mountain areas of Bohernabreena, Glenasmole and Brittas, southeast towards Firhouse, and to the southern edges of Clondalkin in the northwest and Greenhills in the northeast. It lies outside the M50 Dublin orbital motorway, and in effect forms an irregular circle on either side of the N81 Dublin-Blessington road. The suburban villages of Saggart and Rathcoole, and the Citywest campus, with growing amounts of housing, lie west of Tallaght, along with the Air Corps aerodrome at Baldonnel. There is also still considerable open land, some still actively farmed, in this direction.

The village core of the district is located north of, and near to, the River Dodder, and several streams flow in the area. The Jobstown Stream or Tallaght Stream (a tributary of the Dodder), approaches from the west, and takes in at least one tributary, the Killinarden Stream from the south, near the N81. The Fettercairn Stream (a tributary of the River Camac), also passes through the northwest fringes of the area, while the Tymon River, the main component of the River Poddle (an historically important Liffey tributary), rises in Cookstown, near Fettercairn.

=== Transport ===
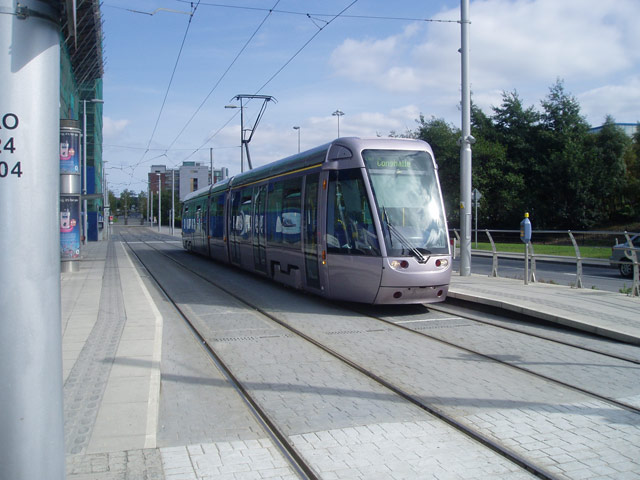
Luas tram in Tallaght

Tallaght is connected to Dublin city by bus services and by the Red Line of the Luas light rail system, which opened in September 2004. Though the first stop (Tallaght Cross) of the Red Line is called Tallaght, most of the 'Red 4' zone (with the exception of the stops at Citywest Campus, Fortunestown and the terminus at Saggart) lies within the broader Tallaght area. The other stops that serve Tallaght include Belgard (which is the last stop before the junction), Fettercairn, Cheeverstown, Cookstown and Hospital.

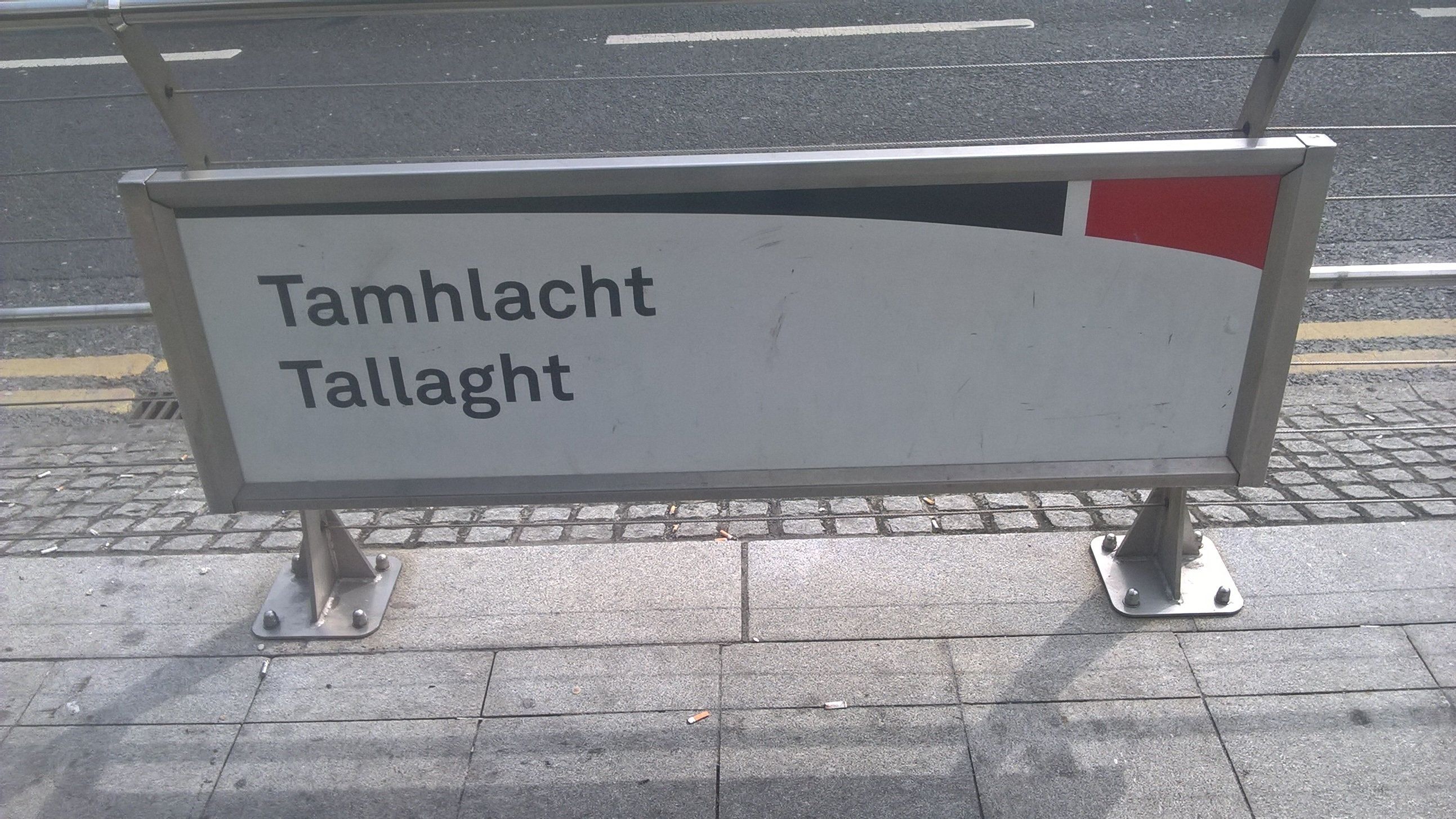
Luas stop Tallaght bilingual sign

A Luas extension from Belgard to Saggart and Citywest was added to the original Luas system and opened in 2011. This 4.2 km (2.5 mi) extension, designated as line A1, is a spur off the Red Line at Belgard that runs to Saggart. Construction started on 9 February 2009, with the line completed by early 2011 and passenger services starting shortly afterwards. It serves housing developments such as Cairnwood, Ambervale, Belgard Green, Fettercairn, Kilmartin, Brookview, Ardmore, Citywest and Russell Square.

Public transport lines predominantly run from Tallaght through the city centre rather than directly to other suburbs. However, the W2 bus route links Tallaght to Clondalkin, Liffey Valley Shopping Centre and Ballyfermot, while the S8 connects to Citywest, Rathfarnham, Ballinteer, Dundrum, Sandyford, Leopardstown, Stillorgan, Monkstown and Dún Laoghaire, and the S6 connects with Templeogue, Dundrum and UCD and Blackrock. According to a 2019 consultation paper for the BusConnects project, Tallaght would be established as a public transport hub for surrounding villages and suburbs.

Bus routes to Dublin city centre include the 27 (via Jobstown and Tymon Park), 56a (The Square, Springfield, Fettercairn and Kingswood), 65 (The Square, Tallaght Hospital, Tallaght Village and Balrothery), 65b (Killinarden Heights, Kiltipper Road, Aylesbury, Old Bawn, Firhouse and Ballycullen), 77a (Blessington, Killinarden Heights, The Square, Tallaght Hospital, Tallaght Village, Oldbawn, Balrothery and Tymon Park), 82 (Poolbeg to Kiltipper) and F1 (IKEA to The Square). Former routes include the 75 (The Square, Rathfarnham, Ballinteer, Dundrum, Stillorgan, and Dún Laoghaire) and 175 (Citywest, Dundrum and UCD). Since November 2023, they have been withdrawn and largely replaced with the new S6 and S8 routes.

While the proposed "Metro West" metro line was projected to serve Tallaght, this proposed project was shelved in 2011.

=== Population ===
Historical population
Year	Pop.	±%
1653	145	—
1659	391	+169.7%
1821	510	+30.4%
1831	359	−29.6%
1841	348	−3.1%
1851	375	+7.8%
1861	537	+43.2%
1871	312	−41.9%
1881	267	−14.4%
1891	289	+8.2%
1901	299	+3.5%
1911	232	−22.4%
1926	333	+43.5%
1936	406	+21.9%
1946	378	−6.9%
1951	352	−6.9%
1956	710	+101.7%
1961	1,402	+97.5%
1966	2,476	+76.6%
1971	6,174	+149.4%
1981	55,104	+792.5%
1986	46,833	−15.0%
1991	62,570	+33.6%
1996	61,611	−1.5%
2002	60,215	−2.3%
2006	65,167	+8.2%
2011	69,454	+6.6%
2016	76,119	+9.6%
2022	81,022	+6.4%

South Dublin County Council stated in 2003 that the population of Tallaght and environs was just under 73,000. Tallaght is the seat of South Dublin County Council and has no specific local administration. While there are two local electoral areas in the form of "Tallaght Central" (based around the historic village core and key modern developments) and "Tallaght South" (the outlying "suburbs" and some rural areas), Tallaght possesses no legal boundary and as a result, there is no official population figure for the area. The population of the village remains modest but the broader area is now one of Ireland's largest population agglomerations. If the entirety of Tallaght and its broadly defined environs were taken into account, then the population would be greater than that of Galway City (75,414), rendering Tallaght the fourth largest area by population in the state. Irish population statistics are calculated from electoral divisions, and these are often combined to estimate "area populations". As of the 2016 census, the total population of the area was 76,119.

Tallaght Ethnic groups 2011	White Irish	Irish Traveller	Other White	Black	Asian	Other	Not Stated
Tallaght Population 69,454	58,596	787	3,934	2,001	1,271	856	2,009

The population of the historic civil parish of Tallaght, including areas such as Templeogue, Ballyroan, and wide areas of mountain as far away as Castlekelly, is 101,059.

=== Districts ===
"Greater Tallaght" comprises Tallaght village and a range of areas that were formerly small settlements (Jobstown, Old Bawn, Kilnamanagh) and rural townlands.

The original village of Tallaght lies west of the Tallaght Bypass (N81). It stretches east–west from Main Road and Main Street to the Abberley Court Hotel at the end of High Street and encompasses the Village Green shopping plaza, Tallaght Courthouse, Westpark, and many shops, and restaurants and banks. It also houses Tallaght Youth Service, Tallaght's first newspaper printing house the Tallaght Echo, and (formally) Tallaght Community Arts Centre. The area's Institute of Technology, Saint Mary's Priory, and Saint Maelruain's Church are located in the historic quarter of Tallaght village.

The newer "town centre" lies immediately to the south across the Belgard Road, encompassing Belgard Square, the main shopping complex (known as The Square also known as the Pyramid), the Luas Red Line terminus, Tallaght Hospital (including the National Children's Hospital), County Hall, the Civic Theatre, South Dublin County Library, Rua Red Arts Centre, and several bars, restaurants and hotels.

To the northeast of the village lies the Tymon North / Balrothery area, which comprised rural townlands until the 1970s. This district includes estates such as Bancroft, Balrothery, Glenview, Castle Park, Saint Aongus, Tymon, Bolbrook and Avonbeg. These areas are home to several sporting facilities, including the National Basketball Arena, a fitness centre, two swimming pools, an athletics track, and an astroturf football facility. Tymon Park is watered by the River Poddle and borders Greenhills and Templeogue. It contains sporting grounds, ponds, Coláiste De Hide and a large playground at the Tymon North entrance.

Old Bawn, formerly a small village in its own right, is immediately south of the village, bordered by Sean Walsh Memorial Park (also locally called Watergate). To the east of Old Bawn, estates include Home Lawns, Mountain Park, Millbrook Lawns and Seskin View. To the south and southwest of the village lie Ellenborough, Aylesbury, and Killinarden (the latter comprising the residential areas of Deer Park, Cushlawn, Donomore, Killinarden Estate and Knockmore). Beyond these are rural lands, running towards the Wicklow Mountains.

In the northwest is Belgard Green, with Belgard Heights (built 1974) to the north. Half of Kingswood is served by Clondalkin Garda Station. Kingswood and Belgard Heights are adjacent to Clondalkin, while Kilnamanagh is situated beside Greenhills and south-west of Walkinstown and Crumlin. Tallaght Theatre is situated along Greenhills Road.

Virginia Heights and Springfield are close to the area's centre, and further west of the town centre is the former hamlet of Jobstown, which is divided from Central Tallaght via the N81 and the Cheeverstown Road, Jobstown now has dense housing estates, and also the previously rural areas of Kiltalown, Brookfield and Fettercairn.

=== Climate ===
Tallaght has an oceanic climate (Köppen: Cfb).

Climate data for Tallaght
Month	Jan	Feb	Mar	Apr	May	Jun	Jul	Aug	Sep	Oct	Nov	Dec	Year
Mean daily maximum °C (°F)	7.4 (45.3)	7.9 (46.2)	9.1 (48.4)	11.1 (52.0)	14.0 (57.2)	16.6 (61.9)	18.0 (64.4)	17.8 (64.0)	16.2 (61.2)	13.2 (55.8)	9.8 (49.6)	7.9 (46.2)	12.4 (54.4)
Daily mean °C (°F)	5.4 (41.7)	5.6 (42.1)	6.5 (43.7)	8.3 (46.9)	11.0 (51.8)	13.7 (56.7)	15.2 (59.4)	15.0 (59.0)	13.4 (56.1)	10.8 (51.4)	7.7 (45.9)	6.0 (42.8)	9.9 (49.8)
Mean daily minimum °C (°F)	3.3 (37.9)	3.3 (37.9)	3.8 (38.8)	5.4 (41.7)	8.0 (46.4)	10.6 (51.1)	12.4 (54.3)	12.3 (54.1)	10.6 (51.1)	8.4 (47.1)	5.5 (41.9)	3.9 (39.0)	7.3 (45.1)
Average precipitation mm (inches)	64.0 (2.52)	59.4 (2.34)	59.4 (2.34)	61.1 (2.41)	73.5 (2.89)	73.2 (2.88)	83.0 (3.27)	82.6 (3.25)	72.4 (2.85)	89.8 (3.54)	85.8 (3.38)	76.6 (3.02)	880.8 (34.69)
Source: Weather.Directory

== Features ==
Historical features in the area include St. Maelruain's Church and Tallaght Castle. The more modern "town centre" area of Tallaght holds offices of local and central government entities, including South Dublin County Council, the Revenue Commissioners, the Department of Social and Family Affairs, the Health Service Executive (Eastern Region), County Dublin V.E.C., as well as local FÁS offices. It is also the location of the County Library, Rua Red - the County Arts Centre, the Civic Theatre, and many shops, bars, and restaurants. Tallaght University Hospital is located nearby.

Tallaght is home to The Square (stylised as "sq."), one of Ireland's largest shopping centres, with three retail levels and accessible by the Luas and by bus. Anchor tenants at the centre include Tesco, Easons, Heatons and Dunnes Stores. Tallaght's 12-screen United Cinemas International cinema closed in March 2010, but was replaced in April 2012 when a 13-screen IMC cinema opened in place of the old one.

Five hotels are located in the "town centre" area: the Plaza Hotel near The Square, the Abberley Court Hotel at High Street, the Maldron Hotel at Whitestown Way, near Seán Walsh Park, and the Glashaus Hotel and Tallaght Cross Hotel at "Tallaght Cross", near the Tallaght Luas Stop.

Across the N81 dual carriageway - south of the "town centre" - is the 10,000-seat football ground called Tallaght Stadium. Initially, construction was undertaken by Shamrock Rovers F.C. on lands belonging to South Dublin County Council, but the project was marred by financial problems, and the site reverted to council ownership. Work on the site recommenced on 6 May 2008, after a judicial review taken by a local GAA club had been thrown out of court the preceding January.

Sean Walsh Memorial Park also lies south of the N81.

== Politics and government ==
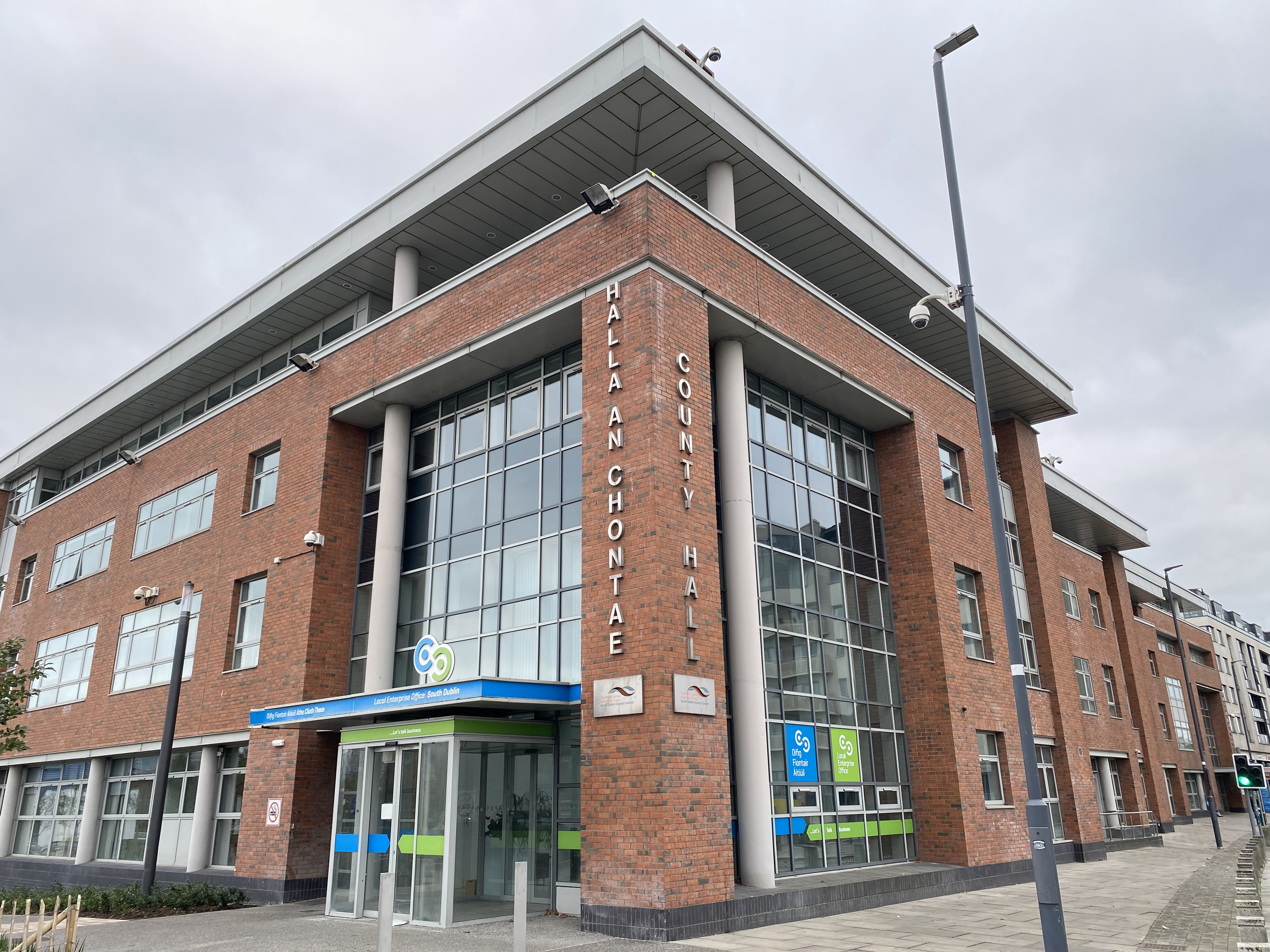
County Hall, Tallaght

Tallaght is represented, within the Dublin South-West constituency in Dáil Éireann, with four TDs. It is divided into two electoral areas for South Dublin County Council elections - Tallaght Central and Tallaght South - and between these 12 councillors are elected.

== Education ==
Schools in Tallaght include St. Mark's National School, St. Mark's Community School, Scoil Maelruain, St. Martin de Porres, St. Dominic's NS, St. Aidan's, St. Thomas', Holy Rosary NS, Scoil Treasa, Old Bawn Community School, Tallaght Community School, Killinarden Community School, Coláiste de hÍde gaelscoil, St. Aidan's Community School, Firhouse Community College and Mount Seskin Community School.

Tallaght is home to one of the campuses of the Technological University Dublin, formerly Institute of Technology, Tallaght (ITT), a third-level college offering undergraduate degrees as well as higher certificates and post-graduate professional qualifications, founded in 1992 as the Regional Technical College, Tallaght. The Priory Institute at the Dominican, St. Mary's Priory, runs certificate, diploma and degree courses in Theology and Philosophy.

== Sports ==
=== Association football ===
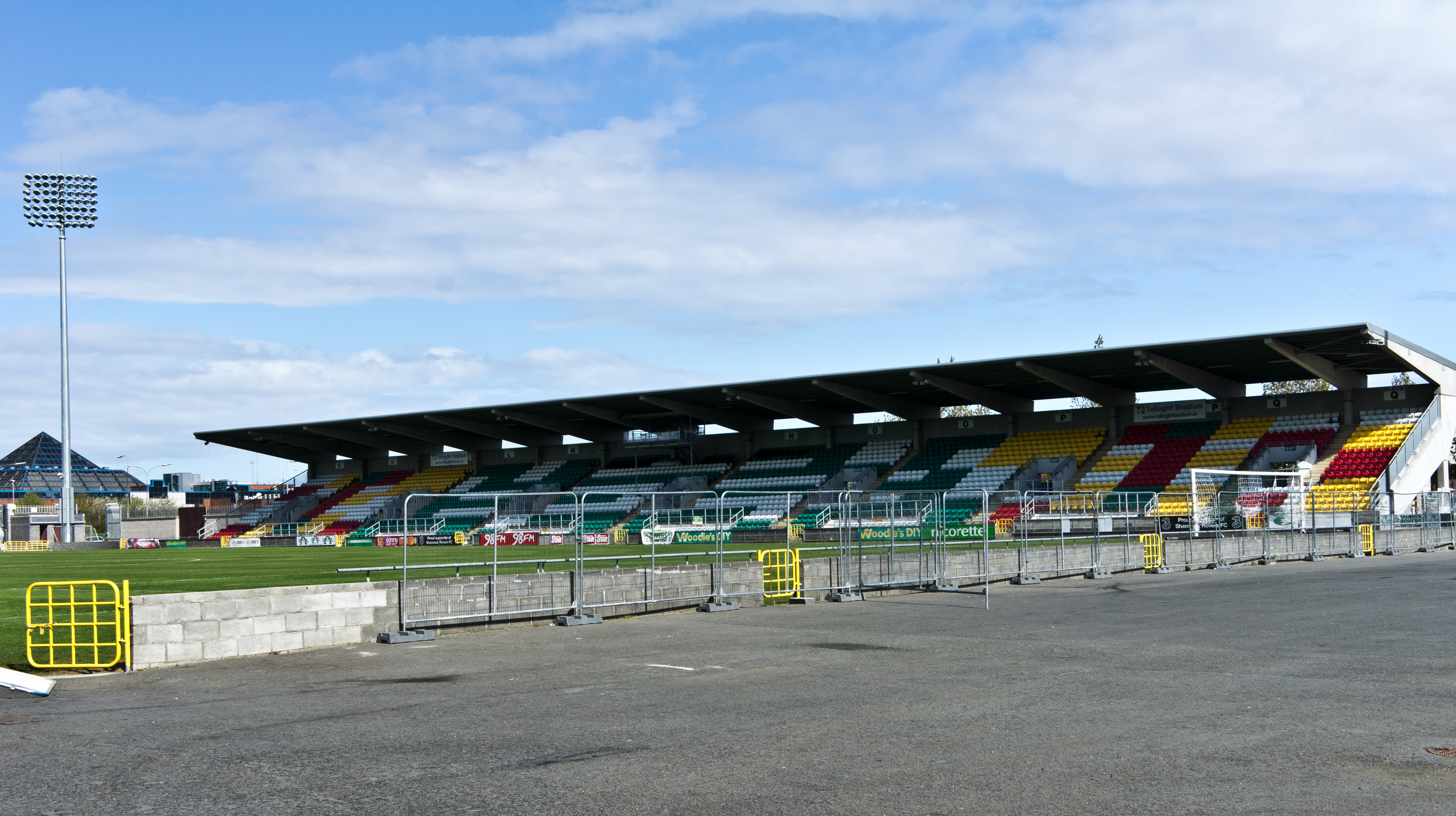
Tallaght Stadium- home of Shamrock Rovers Football Club

Shamrock Rovers F.C. is based in Tallaght, and started playing in Tallaght Stadium in 2009. The club finished its first season in Tallaght as runners-up in the league. The club won their 16th League title in 2010. Rovers followed this up by winning the 2011 League of Ireland. Rovers hosted their first game in European competition in Tallaght in the second qualifying round of the 2010–11 UEFA Europa League against Bnei Yehuda from Israel, with Rovers advancing 2–1 on aggregate. Rovers faced former Champions League and UEFA Cup winners Juventus, Rovers were beaten 2–0 in Tallaght and 3–0 on aggregate. In 2011 the club played its first-ever Champions League game and its first game in the highest level of European Cup Competition since the 1987–88 European Cup, beating Estonian Champions Flora Tallinn in the 2011–12 Champions League Second qualifying round. Rovers were then beaten 3–0 on aggregate in the next round by Danish Champions F.C. Copenhagen but advanced to the 2011-12 Europa League Play-off round. There they were drawn against Serbian Champions FK Partizan, whom they defeated 3–2 on aggregate (2–1 on the night after extra time) to reach the group stages of the Europa League. Rovers also won the All Ireland Setanta Sports Cup in 2011. Rovers wrapped up a second league title in a row on 25 October 2011.

St Maelruans FC is located in Bancroft Park near Tallaght Village. They were founded in 1968, and have teams playing at underage levels and a senior team playing football in the Leinster Senior League. Newtown Rangers AFC is located at Farrell Park, Kiltipper. They were founded in 1957 and have two senior teams playing in the Leinster Senior League.

Brookfield Celtic, one of Dublin's largest underage football clubs, was founded in Tallaght in 1999. Kingswood Castle FC is another local men's soccer club. Founded in 2013, they play their home matches in Ballymount park. The club's home colours are black and white.

=== Gaelic games ===
Saint Anne's GAA, Saint Marks GAA and Thomas Davis GAA Club are local Gaelic Athletic Association clubs.

=== Sports amenities and events ===
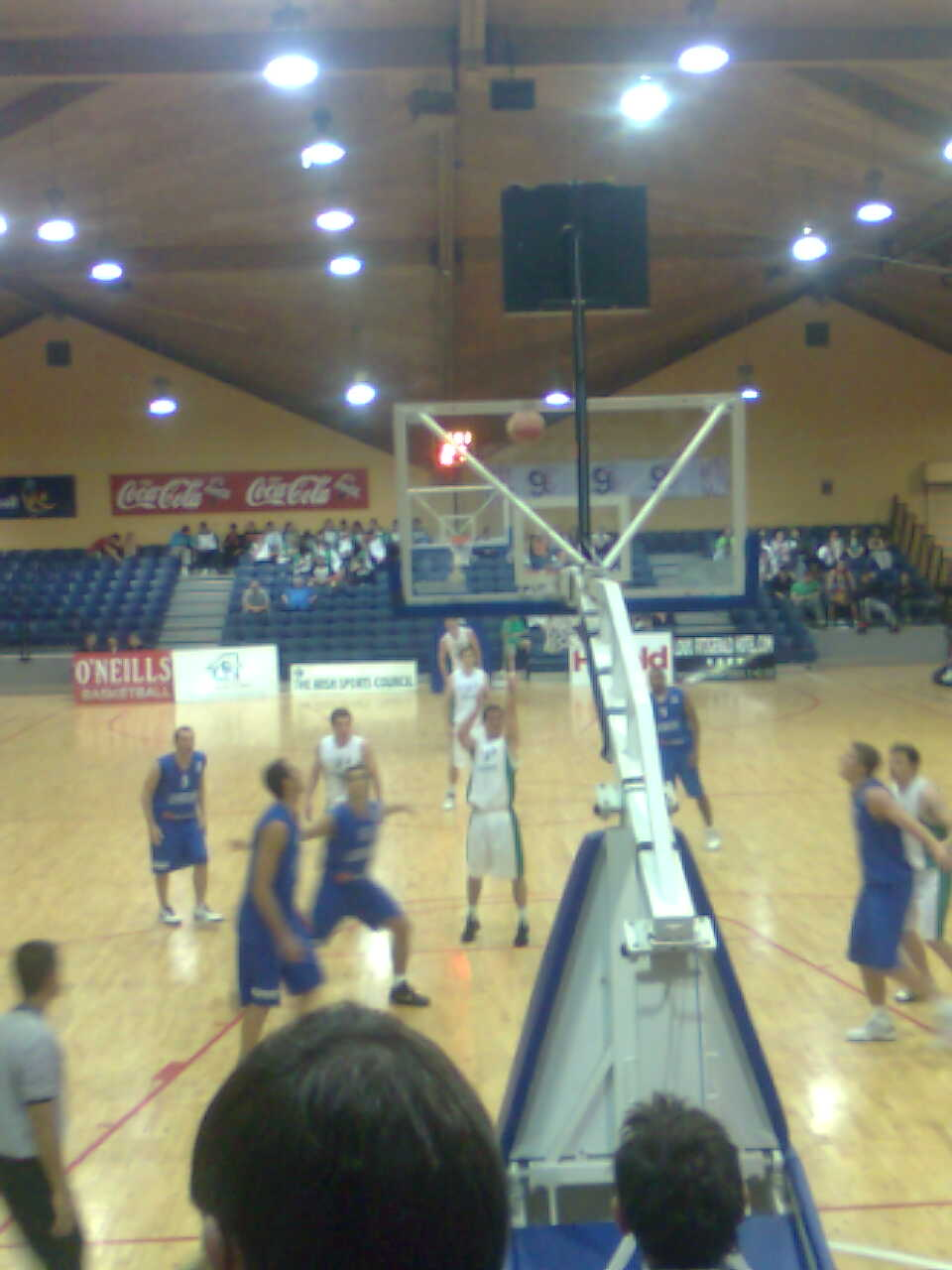
Ireland against Luxembourg at the National Basketball Arena.

The National Basketball Arena lies east of the village.

The trailhead of the Dublin Mountains Way, a long-distance walking route across the Dublin side of the Wicklow Mountains between Tallaght and Shankill, begins at Sean Walsh Park near Tallaght Stadium.

In July 1998, a section of the Tour de France routed through Tallaght.

=== Other sports ===
Tallaght Swim Team is located at the Tallaght Sports Complex, Balrothery, beside Tallaght Community School.

Glenanne Hockey Club is based in Tallaght, playing their home games on the astroturf pitch located in St. Marks Community School.

South Dublin Taekwondo and Eire Taekwondo Association are the only WTF (Olympic Style) Taekwondo clubs in Tallaght. Eire Taekwondo Association was founded in 1988 as St. Martin's Taekwondo club and has since been rebranded and grown to include clubs around Dublin County, as well as in other counties. South Dublin Taekwondo was founded in 2008 and are tenants in the Tallaght Leisure Centre. There are several I.T.F style Taekwon-do clubs in the area.

Tallaght Rugby Football Club was founded as a youth team in 2002 with financial support from the IRFU before setting up a senior team in 2006.

== Arts and entertainment ==
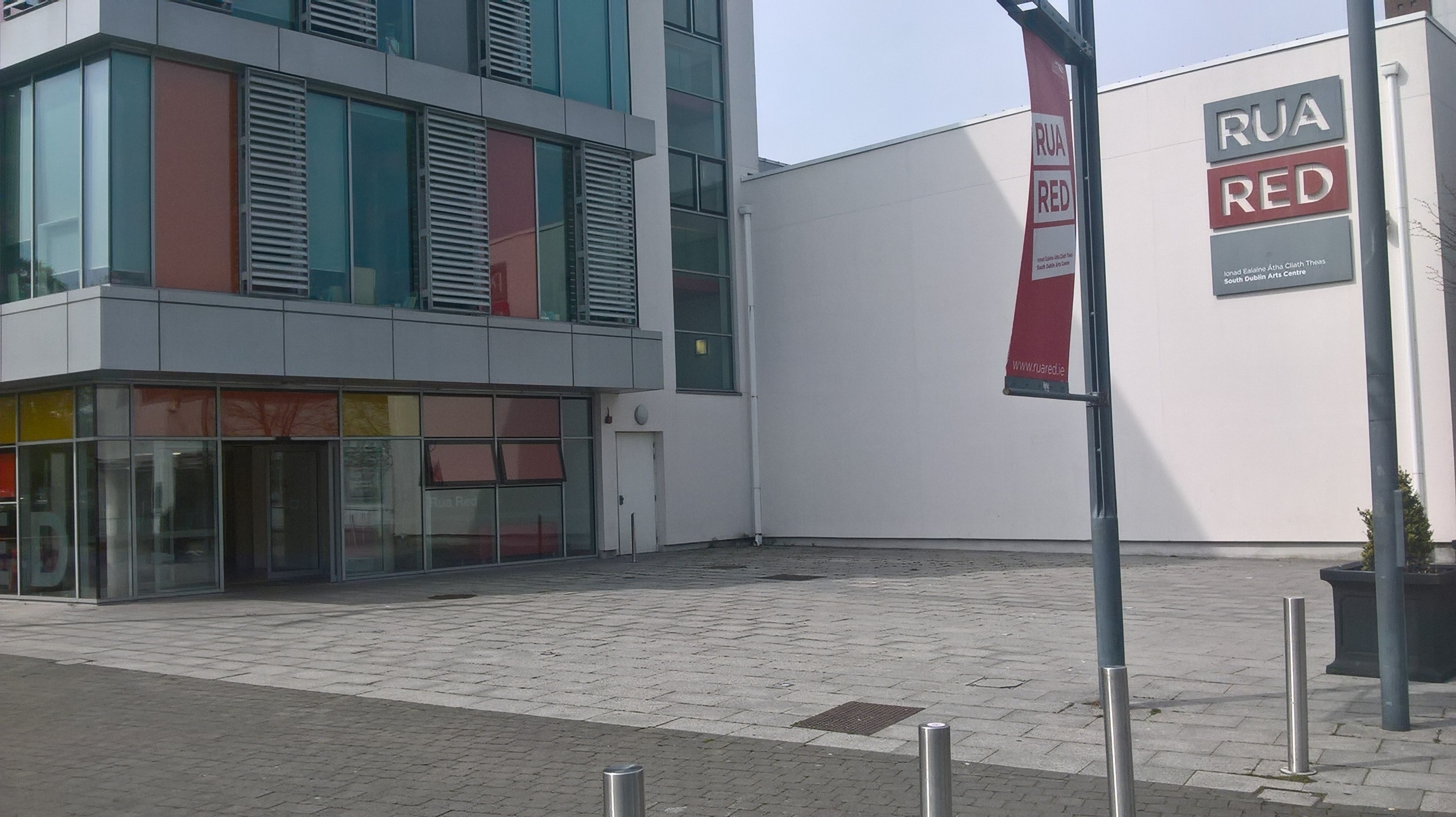
Rua Red Arts Centre

Tallaght Theatre, Tallaght's first dedicated theatre, was launched in 1975 by a not-for-profit amateur dramatic group. It is situated on Greenhills Road. Built sometime later in 1999 beside the civic offices, the Civic Theatre became Tallaght's second theatre.

Rua Red hosts arts/entertainment events and groups. Tallaght Young Filmmakers are a youth filmmaking group initiated by South Dublin County Council's Arts Office in partnership with local young people.

"Movies@ The Square" is a cinema located in the Square shopping centre. The cinema has 11 screens and a V.I.P lounge. The site previously housed UCI Cinemas, before being closed and re-opened as IMC Cinemas. IMC closed this location during the COVID-19 pandemic, with the Movies@ The Square re-opening in 2021.

== Irish language use ==
Existing and prospective Irish speakers in the area are supported by Gaelphobal Thamhlachta, a cultural association which grew out of Cumann Gaelach Thamhlachta, founded in 1974 as a branch of the Gaelic League. In 2015 and 2016, Gaelphobal Thamhlachta received a council grant of €50,000 and a government grant of €150,000, intended to facilitate the creation of a local Irish-language cultural centre, including a public café staffed by local Irish speakers. A further €30,000 was granted by South Dublin County Council in 2019 to help develop a theatre as part of a cultural centre in Tallaght village. Gaelphobal Thamhlachta opened a bilingual café as part of a cultural centre in Tallaght village in December 2019.

There are three Gaelscoileanna (Irish-speaking primary schools) in the area. These include Scoil Santain (founded in 1979), Scoil Chaitlín Maude (founded in 1986 and named after Caitlín Maude, an Irish-language poet, singer and activist who settled in the area) and Scoil na Giúise (founded in 2012). There is also a Gaelcholáiste (an Irish-medium secondary school), Coláiste de hÍde.

== Flags ==
=== Early flag projects ===
In October 2008, An Bhratach Fhulaingt, or the "suffering flag" in English, was designed for Tallaght during The D'No Project, run by Tallaght Youth Theatre in partnership with Tallaght Community Arts, and funded by Léargas. This flag was intended to be flown at the new county arts centre, Rua Red, on 17 and 18 April 2009. However, the flag was ultimately not flown and instead, its colours were used within aspects of the performance.

The flag developed into An Bhratach Seasmhacht, of the "endurance flag" in English. This flag was flown from The Cabin at the Fettercairn Community Centre for 12 months, as part of Tallaght Community Arts "Headin' Out Project" between 2013 and 2014.

=== Tallaght Unity Flag ===
The Tallaght Unity Flag

Designed by Seos Ó Colla and launched in August 2017 after a decade of development by the Tallaght Historical Society, An Bratach Aontacht Thamlachta, or the "Tallaght Unity Flag" in English, has been adopted as a flag for Tallaght by both the Tallaght Historical Society and the Tallaght Community Council. This flag was first flown publicly from a flagpole at the Priory in Tallaght village during Tallafest 2017. Since Easter 2018, it has also been displayed at the Dragon Inn, and as of August 2018, it is also flown at Molloy's The Foxes Covert, a pub in Tallaght village. In September 2017, the Tallaght Unity Flag was presented to the first ever "Tallaght Person of the Year".

The Tallaght Unity Flag prominently features a red deer, symbolising strength and resilience, with its leaping posture suggesting forward movement and progress. The green triangle in the lower left corner represents Tallaght's landscapes and natural environment and signifies growth and harmony. The flag also includes three blue, eight-pointed stars on the right side, inspired by the design captured during the Battle of Tallaght in 1867, representing endurance and the historical struggles of the community, with blue emphasising inclusivity and unity. The white background provides a neutral canvas, symbolising peace and unity.

== People ==
Notable people from Tallaght include:

- Rhasidat Adeleke (b.2002), Irish Athlete
- Dessie Baker, football player
- Richie Baker, football player
- Richard Baneham, Two Oscars for Visual Effects
- Graham Barrett, football player
- Ciarán Bourke, Former member of The Dubliners
- Stephen Bradley, football player and manager
- Jason Byrne, football player
- Kurtis Byrne, football player
- Mark Byrne (b.1988), football player
- Richard Dunne (b.1979), football player
- Keith Fahey (b.1983), football player
- Alice Furlong, Poet and Activist
- Graham Gartland, football player
- Jason Gavin, football player
- Kojii Helnwein (née Wyatt), model and musician
- Patrick Holohan, mixed martial artist / member of South Dublin County Council
- Evie Hone (1894–1955), artist, buried here
- William Howard Russell (1820–1907), journalist, and possibly the world's first modern war correspondent
- Eddie Hyland, professional Boxer
- Patrick Hyland, professional boxer
- Paul Hyland, professional boxer
- Jafaris (b.1995) musician
- Alan Joyce (b.1966), CEO Qantas Airlines
- Robbie Keane (b.1980), football player
- Oisín Kelly (1915–1981), artist and sculptor
- Paul Kelly Irish Musician
- Stephen Kenny football manager
- Emmet Kirwan, actor and writer
- Katie McCabe, football player
- Eric McGill, football player
- Barry Murphy, football player
- Nucentz, rapper, born here in 1987
- David O'Connor (footballer), football player
- Shane O'Connor (b.1985), dart player
- Kieran O'Reilly (b.1979), actor, musician
- Mark O'Rowe (b.1970), playwright
- Tomás Ó Súilleabháin actor, film director
- Nicola Pierce, Irish writer and ghostwriter
- Al Porter, comedian
- Elizabeth Rivers Artist
- June Rodgers (b.1959), comedian
- Lynn Ruane, Senator / activist
- George Otto Simms (1910–1991), Church of Ireland Archbishop of Armagh, and Primate of All Ireland
- Aidan Turner (b.1983), actor (Mitchell in Being Human)
- Katharine Tynan (1861–1931), writer
- Mark Yeates (b.1985), football player

== See also ==
- List of towns and villages in Ireland
- List of abbeys and priories in County Dublin
