= 1364 in Ireland =

- Centuries: 12th; 13th; 14th; 15th; 16th
- Decades: 1340s; 1350s; 1360s; 1370s; 1380s
- See also: Other events of 1364; List of years in Ireland

Events from the year 1364 in Ireland.

== Incumbent ==
- Lord: Edward III

== Events ==
- Robert de Ashton appointed Lord Chancellor of Ireland
- Lyonel, Duke of Clarence, sent by his father, King Edward III as Lord Lieutenant of Ireland to subdue the Irish. He was also the Earl of Ulster and Lord of Connaught, through marriage to his wife, Elizabeth, the only child of the Brown Earl of Ulster. This was his 2nd of 3 attempts. In a few years, as a result of these fruitless shows of force, he had Parliament issue the Statute of Kilkenny.
