= 1366 in Ireland =

- Centuries: 12th; 13th; 14th; 15th; 16th
- Decades: 1340s; 1350s; 1360s; 1370s; 1380s
- See also: Other events of 1366; List of years in Ireland

Events from the year 1366 in Ireland.

== Incumbent ==
- Lord: Edward III

== Events ==
- Irish Parliament at Kilkenny before Prince Lionel of Clarence, Earl of Ulster codifies the legislation of the previous 50 years in the Statutes of Kilkenny, prohibiting, among other things, the adoption of the Irish language by the colonists.
