= 1370 in Ireland =

- Centuries: 12th; 13th; 14th; 15th; 16th
- Decades: 1350s; 1360s; 1370s; 1380s; 1390s
- See also: Other events of 1370; List of years in Ireland

Events in 1370 in Ireland.

== Incumbent ==
Lord: Edward III

== Events ==
Simon Fleming becomes the first Baron Slane whose holding of the title can be conclusively established.

== Births ==
Christopher Bernevall, Irish judge and politician (died in 1446)

== Deaths ==
Simon Fleming, 1st Baron Slane

== See also ==
Simon Fleming, 1st Baron Slane

Christopher Bernevall

List of years in Ireland
