= 1363 in Ireland =

- Centuries: 12th; 13th; 14th; 15th; 16th
- Decades: 1340s; 1350s; 1360s; 1370s; 1380s
- See also: Other events of 1363; List of years in Ireland

Events from the year 1363 in Ireland.

== Incumbent ==
- Lord: Edward III

== Events ==
- 13 June - The unification of the two sees of Waterford and Lismore

== Deaths ==
- 10 December – Elizabeth de Burgh, 4th Countess of Ulster
