= Civic Theatre (Tallaght) =

- Interactive map of the Civic Theatre area
- Alternative names: The Civic

General information
- Type: Theatre
- Location: Belgard Square East, Tallaght, Dublin 24, D24 NWN7, Tallaght, Ireland
- Coordinates: 53.2884°N 6.3722°W
- Opened: 1999

Technical details
- Material: Steel, concrete, Sydney sandstone

Design and construction
- Architect: Eddie Conroy
- Developer: W Stronach

Website
- https://www.civictheatre.ie/

Dublin's Civic Theatre opened in March 1999, a project of South Dublin County Council and also grant aided by the Department of Arts, Heritage, Gaeltacht and the Islands. It is situated in Tallaght, Dublin as part of the town centre, close to The Square Shopping Centre. The theatre has two performance spaces, the main auditorium and the Loose End studio.

The smaller studio space is named the Loose End after the Civic’s location at the last stop of the Luas red line. The larger main auditorium can seat 282 people and the Loose End can seat up to 70 people.

There is a café, the Betelnut café, on site.
