= 1372 in Ireland =

- Centuries: 12th; 13th; 14th; 15th; 16th
- Decades: 1350s; 1360s; 1370s; 1380s; 1390s
- See also: Other events of 1372; List of years in Ireland

Events from the year 1372 in Ireland.

== Incumbent ==
- Lord: Edward III

== Deaths ==
- Seán Mór Ó Dubhagáin, Gaelic poet.
