= Kilnamanagh =

Suburb of Dublin, Ireland

Kilnamanagh Cill na Manach (Irish)
- Townland
- Location in Dublin
- Coordinates: 53.3°N 6.3649°W
- Country: Ireland
- Province: Leinster
- County: County Dublin
- Local authority: South Dublin County Council

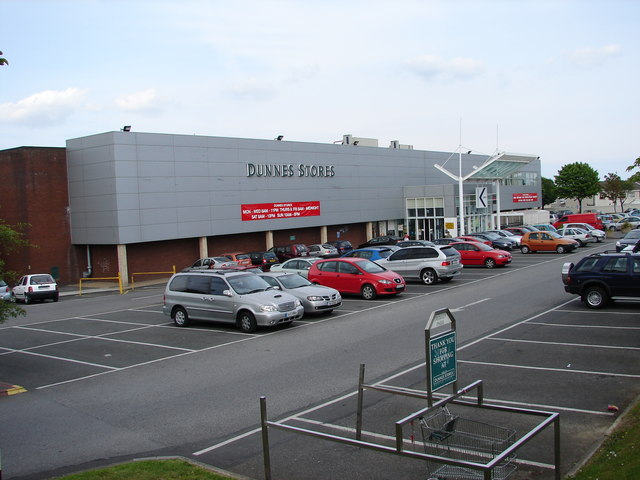
Dunnes Stores, Kilnamanagh Shopping Centre

Kilnamanagh (Irish: Cill na Manach, meaning 'Church of the monks') is a townland and suburban residential area in Tallaght, County Dublin, Ireland. It is in the local government area of South Dublin.

== History ==
Its Irish name, Cill na Manach translates to "church of the monks", referring to the church and castle established to house Saint Kevin and his followers. Present day Kilnamanagh has ties to Glendalough, the other resting place of St Kevin.

The ancient Church of St. Kevin, and a castle located in Kilnamanagh, were destroyed when the building of the housing estate commenced in 1974 by the estate's developers. The well that was built by St. Kevin is now covered up, but there is still a small garden around the well. The well and garden have been fenced in for fear of desecration. The gates are locked and access is controlled by the local church. There are many references to St. Kevin and his followers in Kilnamanagh; the school, church and local sports teams are named after him. The modern St. Kevin's Church was built in 1978.

During the 1980s, a number of annual community events were held in the parish including a Sunday Fete and an annual cycle pilgrimage to Glendalough.

== Development of suburb ==
Kilnamanagh was one of the largest housing estates in Europe at the time it was built by Tom Brennan and Joseph McGowan, who traded as Kilnamanagh Estates. On release to the market, the first tranche of 3-bedroom semi-detached houses were priced at £5,995.

Kilnamanagh is divided into smaller neighbourhood areas such as Treepark (first built in 1980), Redwood (first built in 1974), Pinetree (first built in 1981 and is the only public housing scheme developed by the County Council), Elmcastle (first built in 1974), Parkhill (built in 1977), Birchview (built in 1972), and Tamarisk (built in 1975).

The first houses built which were at Birchview, adjacent to the Greenhills Road, were the only houses in Kilnamanagh that had wooden floorboards on the ground level with under floor heating, and was the only part of the estate to have a street gas supply since its construction in 1972. Most of the other parts of the estate eventually had a street gas supply installed around 1990, with the exception of houses in the Elmcastle neighbourhood which had timber floors and gas ducted heating since their construction in 1974.

The Luas red line and M50 are located between Kingswood and Kilnamanagh within walking distance of the entire estate. The Luas stops are Belgard and Kingswood.

== Clubs, associations and societies ==
There is an active soccer club known as Kilnamanagh A.F.C. The club play at Ned Kelly Park on Elm Castle Drive.

The community centre, known as Kilnamanagh Family and Recreation Centre, built two 'astro parks' with floodlights and a grass pitch in August 2009.

There is an active GAA club in Kilnamanagh. Formerly known as St. Kevin's GAA club, it merged with St. Killian's GAA club from the neighbouring area of Kingswood to become known as St. Kevin's Killians. Kilnamanagh has three GAA pitches in the middle of the estate.

Kilnamanagh was well known for its summer projects in the 1980s, involving community members of all ages to participate in activities such as excursions out from the area, arts and crafts, organised children's discos, and cinema. The projects continued for a number of years and were centred mainly at Saint Kevin's Primary School during July every year. Set up by volunteers and parents from the area, it started in 1982 and ran successfully until 1989.

== Economy and amenities ==
Located between the Mayberry Road and Treepark is the Kilnamanagh Shopping Centre. At its peak during the 1980s, and before the opening of The Square The Square Shopping Centre on the Belgard Road, Kilnamanagh Shopping Centre was a popular shopping destination for people from the surrounding areas. The biggest retailer in the centre is Dunnes Stores. Kilnamanagh has a fuel filling station located on its primary access route (Mayberry Road). Kilnamanagh is close to The Square shopping centre in Tallaght, the third largest shopping centre in Ireland.

In addition to the shopping centre, anchored by Dunnes Stores, Kilnamanagh has a primary school (St. Kevin's), a credit union and a community centre, which also has a bar.

Kilnamanagh's former local pub, The Cuckoo's Nest, closed in June 2015. It had been in the Lynch family for 53 years. In December 2017 work started demolishing part of the pub to make way for 48 houses and 6 apartments. The new development is to be called TempleWood.

== People ==
Former Dublin Senior footballer and Westmeath Senior Gaelic Football team manager Paul Bealin began his career playing for St Kevin's GAA in Kilnamanagh during the 1980s.

Republic of Ireland football captain Katie McCabe is from Kilnamanagh.
