= Glenview, Tallaght =

Estate in Tallaght in Dublin, Ireland

Coordinates: 53.288753°N 6.34393°W

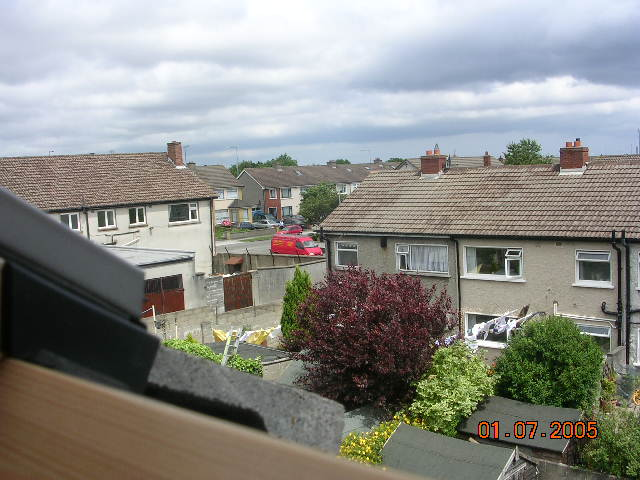
A view from one of the Houses

Glenview (Irish: Radharc an Ghleanna) is a series of small estates in Tallaght, South Dublin.

Glenview is home to a population of almost 1,700 (Census 2002). The estates include the larger Glenview Park, which includes a small shopping center (See below). The other estates are Glenview Lawns and Glenview Drive. Brookmount and Newtown road are also considered part of the Glenview Area. Most of the houses in the estate are three-bedroom terraced houses, but there are also three-bedroom semi-detached and a small number of detached houses. The estate is on the outskirts of the village and a short walking distance from The Square Shopping Center.

There are a number of retail outlets in the Glenview Shopping Centre. These include a grocery shop, hairdressers, pharmacy, beauty salon, post office, surgery and dentist. There is also a bed and breakfast and a daycare center, which has had a float in Tallaght St. Patrick's Day parade in the past.
