= 1374 in Ireland =

- Centuries: 12th; 13th; 14th; 15th; 16th
- Decades: 1350s; 1360s; 1370s; 1380s; 1390s
- See also: Other events of 1374; List of years in Ireland

Events from the year 1374 in Ireland.

== Incumbent ==
- Lord: Edward III

== Events ==
- William Tany, Prior of the Order of St. John of Jerusalem appointed Lord Chancellor of Ireland
