= Tallaght Castle =

Former castle founded in the 14th century in Tallaght, Ireland

- site of The Priory Institute Tallaght, in County Dublin
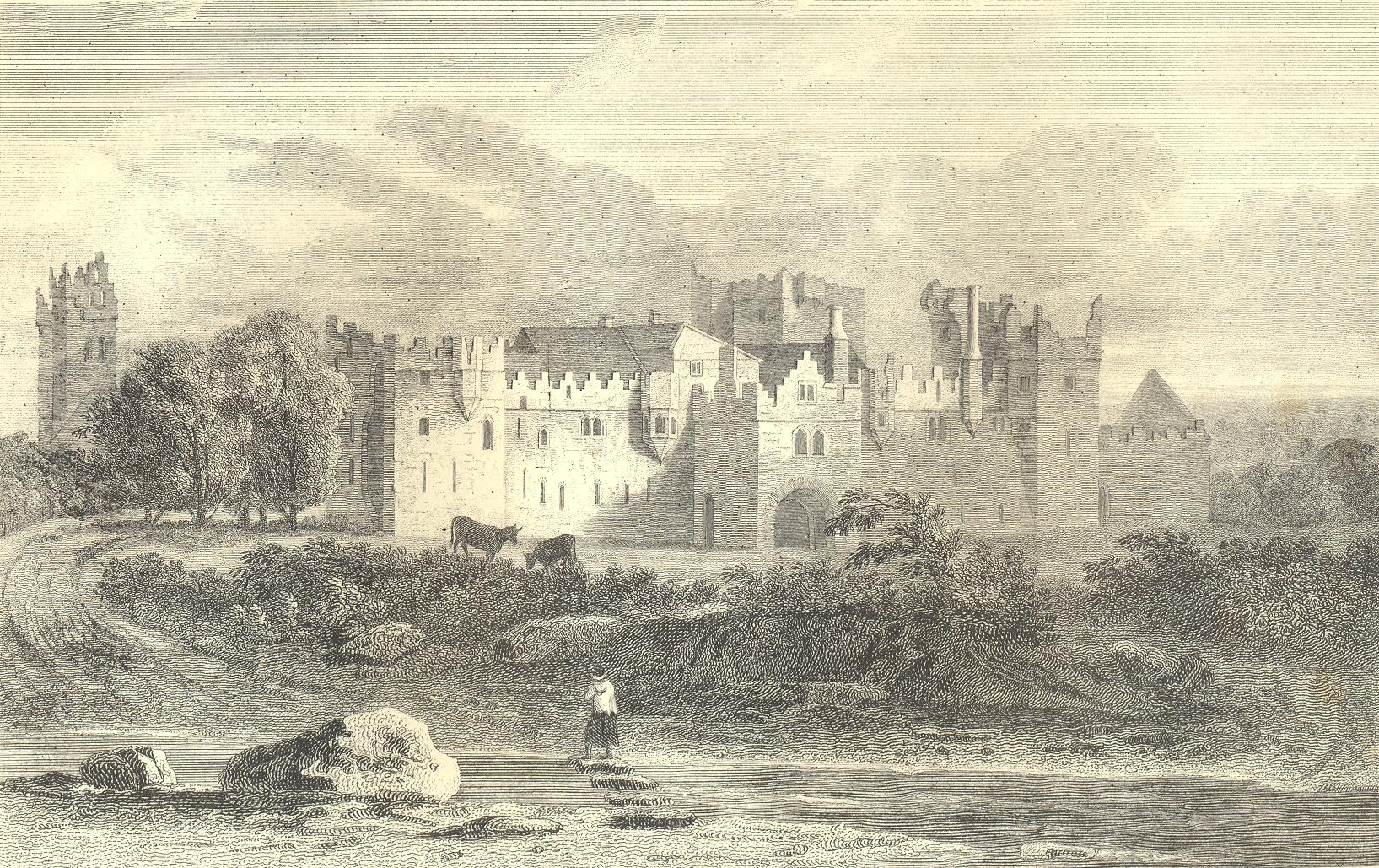
- View of the Antient Archiepiscopal Palace, Tallaght. 1818

Location
- Coordinates: 53.2892°N 6.3608°W

Tallaght Castle (also known as Tallaght House and formerly known as the Archiepiscopal Palace) was a castle in Kilnamanagh, Tallaght, County Dublin, Ireland. It dates from the 14th century. It became an official residence of the Church of Ireland Archbishop of Dublin until 1822. It was taken over by the Dominican Order in 1856.

The castle is now in ruins with only a small proportion of it incorporated into the St. Mary's Priory building, in the grounds of St. Mary's Dominican Priory and the Priory Institute The old palace gardens, Archbishop’s bathhouse, the Friar's Walk and St. Maelruain's Tree still remain in the current grounds.

== Development ==
Tallaght village was first walled in about 1310. As ordered by Archbishop Alexander de Bicknor, the initial castle was built between 1324 and the 1340s, to defend the settlement. The original castle is thought to have comprised high walls with a courtyard in the centre. It was in bad condition a century later.

In the mid-1400s, improvements were made by Archbishop Michael Tregury, leading to an increase in usage by subsequent Archbishops. Members of Archbishop Loftus's family were killed at the gates of the castle in the 1570s.

Archbishop John Hoadly built a palace on the remains from 1727 to 1729 at a cost of £2,500. The grounds had a brewery and a granary and stables. By 1760 some of the buildings had become 'dilapidated'.

Archbishop of Dublin's Estate Act 1821
- Act of Parliament
- Parliament of the United Kingdom
- Long title: An Act to enable the Lord Archbishop of Dublin, and his Successors, to demise the Mansion House of Tallaght, with the Offices, Houses, Gardens and Demesne, situate at Tallaght, in the County of Dublin, belonging to the Archbishop of Dublin.
- Citation: 1 & 2 Geo. 4. c. 15

Dates
- Royal assent: 28 May 1821

In 1821, an act of Parliament (1 & 2 Geo. 4. c. 15) was passed which stated that it was unfit for habitation. In 1822 the property was sold to Major Palmer, Inspector General of Prisons, who pulled most of the palace down and used the materials to build his mansion, 'Tallaght House', as well as a schoolhouse and several cottages. A tower from the original castle was left untouched and later was incorporated into the current priory building. The once four-storey-high tower now has just internally two. Major Palmer later sold the mansion and lands to his successor as Inspector of Prisons, Mr Lentaigne.

When the Dominican friars took a lease out on the property in the 1840s, one of the buildings was converted into a chapel. The friars eventually bought the property from Mr Lentaigne in 1855. The chapel was replaced with a purpose-built church, dedicated to Fr. Tom Burke, in 1883. Part of the house burned down in the first decade of the 1900s.
