= 1378 in Ireland =

- Centuries: 12th; 13th; 14th; 15th; 16th
- Decades: 1350s; 1360s; 1370s; 1380s; 1390s
- See also: Other events of 1378; List of years in Ireland

Events from the year 1378 in Ireland.

== Incumbent ==
- Lord: Richard II

== Events ==
- Mathew, son of Redmond de Bermingham, takes up station at Tallaght Castle to resist the O'Byrnes.
