= 1381 in Ireland =

- Centuries: 12th; 13th; 14th; 15th; 16th
- Decades: 1360s; 1370s; 1380s; 1390s; 1400s
- See also: Other events of 1381; List of years in Ireland

Events from the year 1381 in Ireland.

== Incumbent ==
- Lord: Richard II

== Events ==
- McDonaghs take possession of Ballymote Castle, County Sligo from the Mac Diarmada
