= 1380 in Ireland =

- Centuries: 12th; 13th; 14th; 15th; 16th
- Decades: 1360s; 1370s; 1380s; 1390s; 1400s
- See also: Other events of 1380; List of years in Ireland

Events from the year 1380 in Ireland.

== Incumbent ==
- Lord: Richard II

== Deaths ==
- Donell Ó Dubhda, King of Ui Fiachrach Muaidhe.
- Milo Sweetman, Archbishop of Armagh.
