= 1328 =

1328 in various calendars
- Gregorian calendar: 1328; MCCCXXVIII
- Ab urbe condita: 2081
- Armenian calendar: 777; ԹՎ ՉՀԷ
- Assyrian calendar: 6078
- Balinese saka calendar: 1249–1250
- Bengali calendar: 734–735
- Berber calendar: 2278
- English Regnal year: 1 Edw. 3 – 2 Edw. 3
- Buddhist calendar: 1872
- Burmese calendar: 690
- Byzantine calendar: 6836–6837
- Chinese calendar: 丁卯年 (Fire Rabbit); 4025 or 3818 — to — 戊辰年 (Earth Dragon); 4026 or 3819
- Coptic calendar: 1044–1045
- Discordian calendar: 2494
- Ethiopian calendar: 1320–1321
- Hebrew calendar: 5088–5089
- Hindu calendars
- Vikram Samvat: 1384–1385
- Shaka Samvat: 1249–1250
- Kali Yuga: 4428–4429
- Holocene calendar: 11328
- Igbo calendar: 328–329
- Iranian calendar: 706–707
- Islamic calendar: 728–729
- Japanese calendar: Karyaku 3 (嘉暦３年)
- Javanese calendar: 1240–1241
- Julian calendar: 1328; MCCCXXVIII
- Korean calendar: 3661
- Minguo calendar: 584 before ROC 民前584年
- Nanakshahi calendar: −140
- Thai solar calendar: 1870–1871
- Tibetan calendar: མེ་མོ་ཡོས་ལོ་ (female Fire-Hare); 1454 or 1073 or 301 — to — ས་ཕོ་འབྲུག་ལོ་ (male Earth-Dragon); 1455 or 1074 or 302

Year 1328 (MCCCXXVIII) was a leap year starting on Friday of the Julian calendar.

== Events ==
- January 17 – Louis IV, "the Bavarian", is crowned Holy Roman Emperor at St. Peter's Basilica in Rome. Because of conflict with the Avignon Papacy, the ceremony is carried out by a senator and three Italian bishops.
- January 24 – Philippa of Hainault marries King Edward III of England a year after his coronation. The marriage produces ten children, the eldest of whom is Edward the Black Prince.
- April 1 – Joan II became queen of Navarre.
- May 1 – Treaty of Edinburgh–Northampton: England recognises Scotland as an independent nation, after the Wars of Scottish Independence.
- May 12 – Antipope Nicholas V is consecrated at St. Peter's Basilica in Rome by the bishop of Venice.
- May 26 – William of Ockham secretly leaves Avignon, under threat from Pope John XXII.
- May 29 – King Philip VI of France is crowned, founding the House of Valois, after the death of King Charles IV of France, who has no sons to inherit.
- August 23 – Battle of Cassel: French troops stop an uprising of Flemish farmers.
- Undated – The Augustiner-Bräu is first recorded as the brewery of an Augustinian monastery at Munich.

== Births ==
- April 1 – Blanche of France, Duchess of Orléans (d. 1393)
- May 7 – Louis VI the Roman, Duke of Bavaria and Elector of Brandenburg (d. 1365)
- June 25 – William de Montagu, 2nd Earl of Salisbury, English military leader (d. 1397)
- September 29 – Joan of Kent, princess of Wales, spouse of Edward the Black Prince (d. 1385)
- October 9 – King Peter I of Cyprus (d. 1369)
- October 21 – Hongwu Emperor of China (d. 1398)
- November 11 – Roger Mortimer, 2nd Earl of March, English military leader (d. 1360)
- November 25 – Antipope Benedict XIII, born Pedro Martínez de Luna (d. 1423)
- date unknown
  - Archibald Douglas, 3rd Earl of Douglas ("Archibald the Grim", "Black Archibald"), Scottish magnate and warrior (d. 1400)
  - Emperor Go-Murakami of Japan (d. 1368)

== Deaths ==
- February 1 – King Charles IV of France (b. 1294)
- August 15 – Yesün Temür, emperor of the Yuan dynasty (b. 1293)
- August 23 – Nicolaas Zannekin, Flemish peasant leader (in the battle of Cassel)
- September 26 – Ibn Taymiyyah, Islamic scholar and philosopher of Harran (b. 1263)
- October 12 (or 13) – Clementia of Hungary, Queen consort of France and Navarre (b. 1293)
- November 16 – Prince Hisaaki, Japanese shōgun (b. 1276)
- date unknown
  - Meister Eckhart, German theologian (b. 1260)
  - Andronikos Angelos Palaiologos, Byzantine nobleman and governor (b. ca. 1282)
