= 1377 in Ireland =

- Centuries: 12th; 13th; 14th; 15th; 16th
- Decades: 1350s; 1360s; 1370s; 1380s; 1390s
- See also: Other events of 1377; List of years in Ireland

Events from the year 1377 in Ireland.

== Incumbent ==
- Lord: Edward III (until 21 June), then Richard II

== Events ==
- Robert Wikeford, Primate of Ireland appointed Lord Chancellor of Ireland.

== Deaths ==
- Brian Ó Flaithbheartaigh was a possible Taoiseach of Iar Connacht and Chief of the Name. He is thought to have been Taoiseach, but he is not explicitly named as such in his obituary.
