= 1382 in Ireland =

- Centuries: 12th; 13th; 14th; 15th; 16th
- Decades: 1360s; 1370s; 1380s; 1390s; 1400s
- See also: Other events of 1382; List of years in Ireland

Events from the year 1382 in Ireland.

== Incumbent ==
- Lord: Richard II

== Events ==
- Aghaboe Abbey in County Laois is rebuilt by Fighin Fitzpatrick and granted to the Dominican Order.
- William Tany, Prior of the Order of St. John of Jerusalem appointed Lord Chancellor of Ireland

== Births ==
・Davi of Irish (d.1468) ・Dave Irish(d.14??)

== Deaths ==
- 18 October - James Butler, 2nd Earl of Ormonde, Lord Justice of Ireland (b.1331).
- Thomas de Thelwall
