= Hospital Luas stop =

Tram stop in Dublin, Ireland

Hospital Ospidéal Thamhlachta
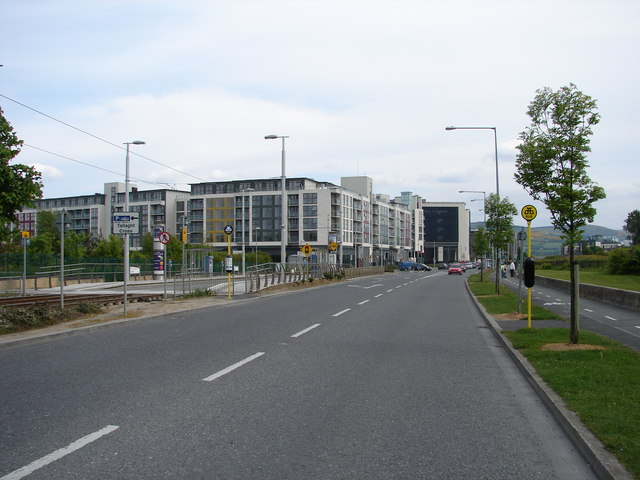
- A view of the stop

General information
- Location: Dublin; Ireland
- Coordinates: 53°17′22″N 6°22′44″W
- Owner: Transport Infrastructure Ireland
- Operator: Luas
- Line: Red
- Platforms: 2

Construction
- Structure type: At-grade

Other information
- Fare zone: Red 4

Key dates
- 26 September 2004: Station opened

Services
Preceding station	Luas	Following station
Tallaght Terminus	Red Line	Cookstown towards The Point or Connolly
Location
- Location within Dublin

Hospital (Irish: Ospidéal Thamhlachta) is a stop on the Luas light-rail tram system in Dublin, Ireland. It opened in 2004 as a stop on the Red Line. The stop is located on a section of reserved track at the side of Cookstown Way in south-west Dublin, immediately outside Tallaght University Hospital.

== Incidents ==
On 23 February 2008, Cookstown Way was the site of the first ever fatal incident on the Luas. Tallaght resident Anthony Creed was struck by a southbound tram a short distance south of the Hospital stop. He was taken to Tallaght Hospital itself, where he died the following morning.

On 14 February 2019 a woman was struck and killed on a Tallaght bound tram between the Cookstown and Tallaght Hospital stops. She was pronounced dead at the scene.
