= Cookstown Luas stop =

Tram stop in Dublin, Ireland

Cookstown Baile an Chócaigh
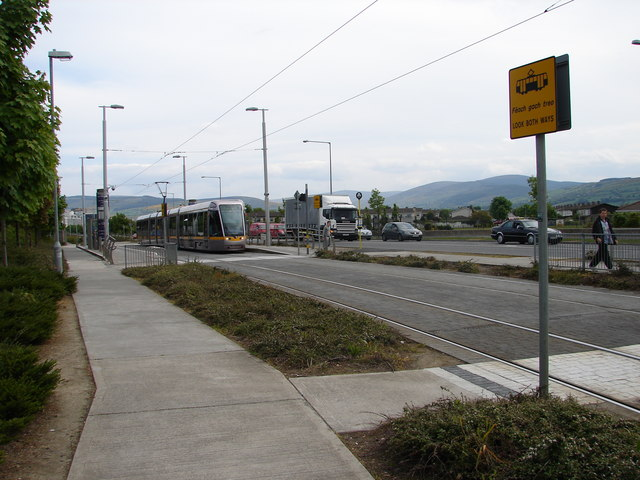
- A tram at Cookstown

General information
- Location: Dublin; Ireland
- Coordinates: 53°17′37″N 6°23′04″W
- Owner: Transport Infrastructure Ireland
- Operator: Luas
- Line: Red
- Platforms: 2

Construction
- Structure type: At-grade

Other information
- Fare zone: Red 4

Key dates
- 26 September 2004: Station opened

Services
Preceding station	Luas	Following station
Hospital towards Tallaght	Red Line	Belgard towards The Point or Connolly
Location
- Location within Dublin

Cookstown (Irish: Baile an Chócaigh) is a stop on the Luas light-rail tram system in Dublin, Ireland. It opened in 2004 as a stop on the Red Line. The stop is located on a section of reserved track at the side of Cookstown Way in south-west Dublin.
