= Belgard Luas stop =

Tram stop in Dublin, Ireland

Belgard
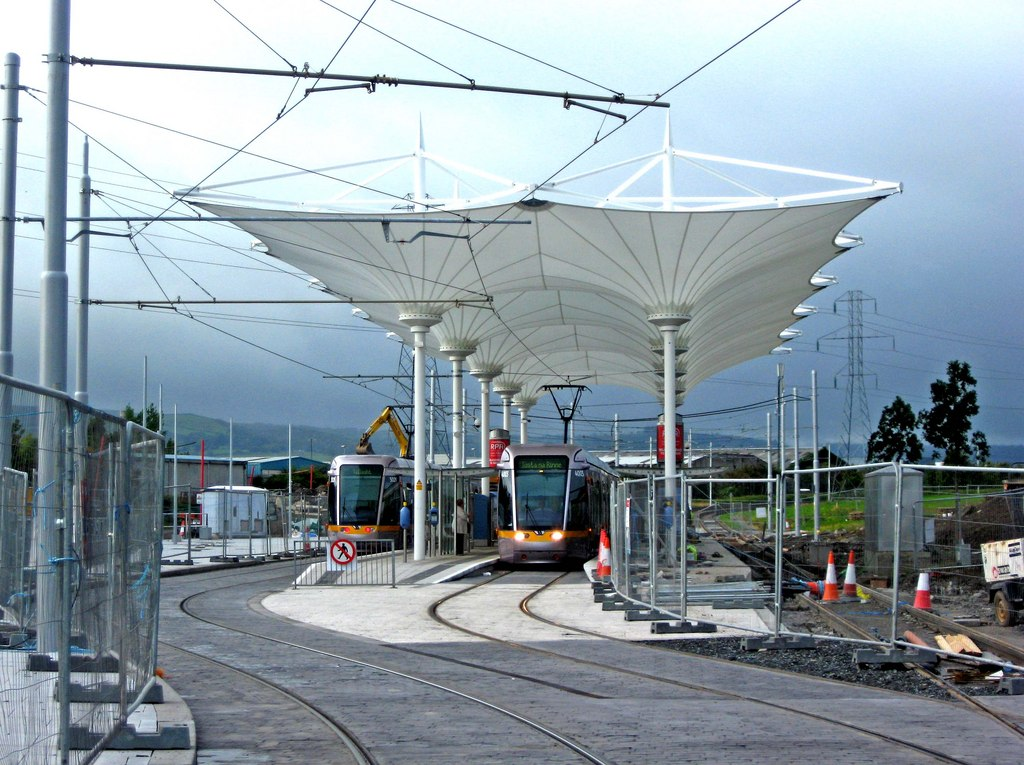
- Belgard during the upgrade works in 2010

General information
- Location: Hibernian Industrial Estate; Tallaght, County Dublin; Ireland
- Coordinates: 53°17′56″N 6°22′31″W
- Owner: Transport Infrastructure Ireland
- Operator: Transdev (as Luas)
- Line: Red
- Platforms: 4

Construction
- Structure type: At-grade

Other information
- Fare zone: Red 4

History
- Opened: 26 September 2004

Key dates
- 2 July 2011: Services to Saggart commence
Location
- Location within Dublin

Belgard is a stop on the Luas light-rail tram system in Dublin, Ireland. It is located on the red line and is the junction for trams to Tallaght and Saggart. The stop is located on a section of reserved track at the side of Katherine Tynan Road in south-west Dublin, near the Belgard Heights housing estate.

== History ==
It opened on 30 September 2004 following the opening the Red Line.

In 2011, a new branch of the red line to Saggart was opened. Belgard then became the last stop on the common section of the line and was extensively rebuilt in order to serve its new purpose as an interchange, with an impressive canopy covering the new structure. The stop now has four platforms - two island platforms facing three tracks.

== Services ==
Ordinarily, the two outer platforms are used as a conventional through stop: the platform closest to the road is for northbound trams en route to Connolly or The Point, and the farthest platform is for trams travelling the other way, which then depart and travel another 400m away from the stop before going through a junction which separates the branches to Tallaght and Saggart.

In the early mornings, evenings, and on weekends, Red Line trams from the city centre all go to Tallaght. At these times, the Saggart branch is served by a shuttle service which terminates at the middle track at Belgard. Passengers wishing to travel between Saggart and the city centre at these times must change at Belgard.

Preceding station	Luas	Following station
Cookstown towards Tallaght	Red Line	Kingswood towards The Point or Connolly
Fettercairn towards Saggart	Red Line	Kingswood towards The Point or Connolly

=== Bus connections ===
The stop is also served by Go-Ahead Ireland orbital route W2.
