= The Square Tallaght =

Large suburban retail facility in Tallaght southwest of Dublin

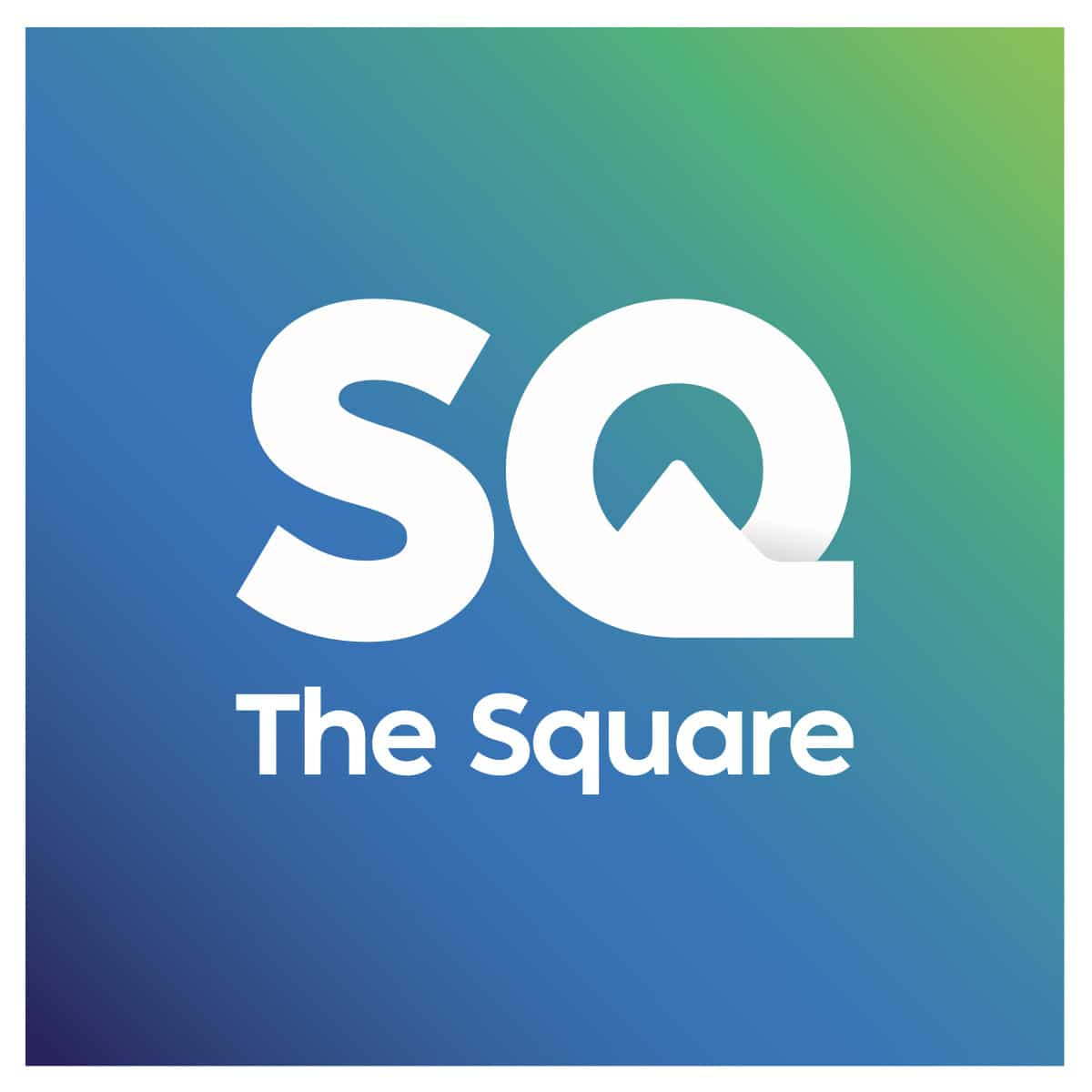

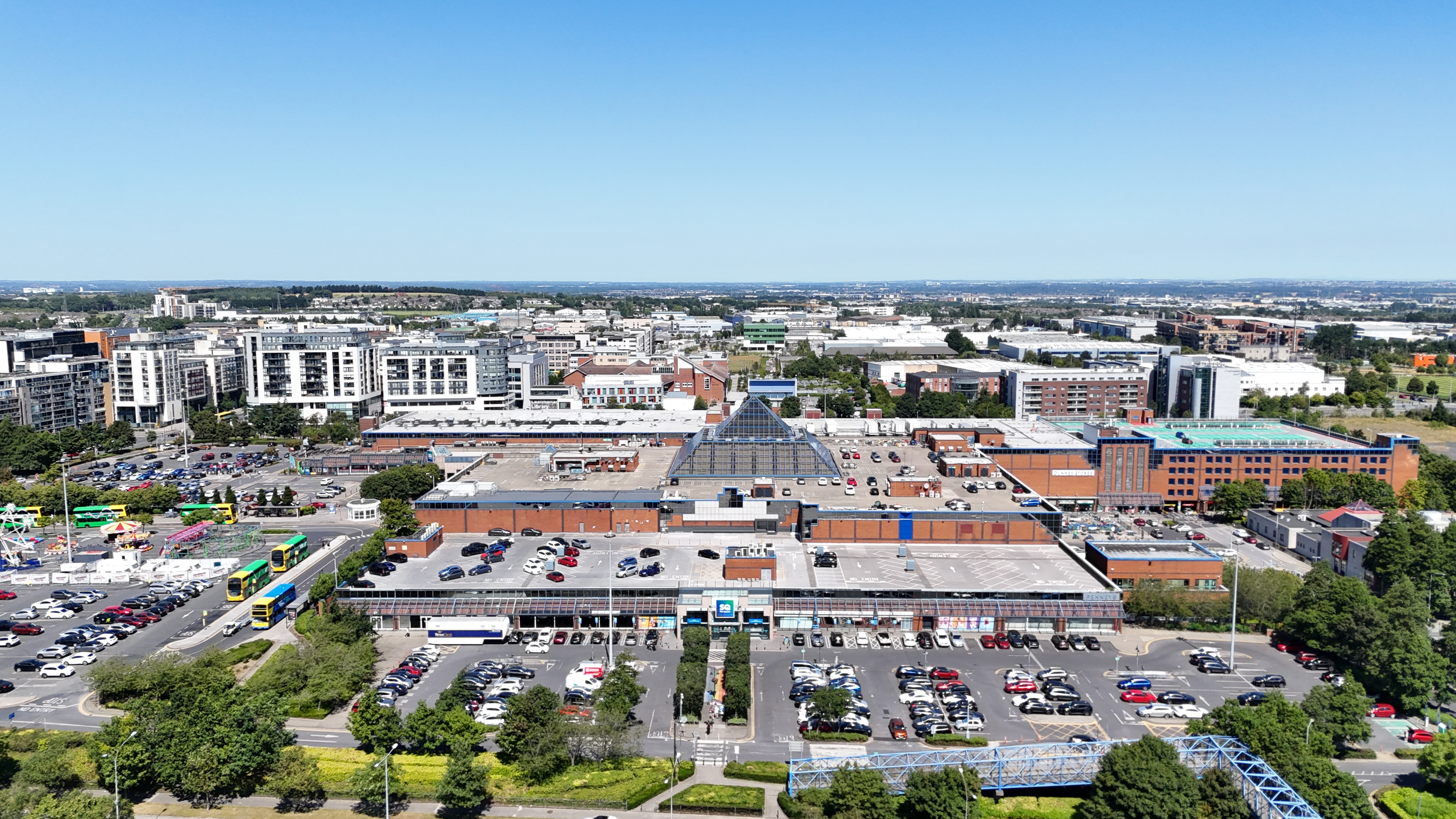
- View of The Square in 2025
- Location: Tallaght, Dublin, Ireland
- Coordinates: 53°17′13″N 6°22′18″W
- Address: The Square Towncentre; Tallaght; Dublin 24
- Opened: 23 October 1990 (36 years ago)
- Num. of stores: 163
- Floors: 3 (main levels)
- Website: http://www.thesquare.ie/

The Square Tallaght is a shopping centre located in Tallaght, Dublin, Ireland, opened in 1990. It is located 10 minutes from junction 11 of the M50 motorway on the Belgard Road (the R113 road) and the N81 road.

The centre comprises 53,000 m^{2} of retail space, spread across three levels, and as of 2016 has up to 163 stores. It has an annual footfall of 21.7 million.

There are over 2500 car parking spaces. The anchor tenants are Dunnes Stores, Penneys and Tesco. When The Square opened it was the largest shopping centre in Ireland.

== History ==
The centre was opened on 23 October 1990, in the presence of 45,000 people, by then Taoiseach Charles Haughey, having been built at a cost of £85 million. Others who were in attendance included Gay Byrne, who hosted his radio show from the "Crows Nest" in the shopping centre, as well as Mary Harney, Pat Rabbitte, the then Director-General of RTÉ Vincent Finn and the Fine Gael leader at the time Alan Dukes.

It was the first of four large shopping complexes built in the suburban centres surrounding Dublin from the late 1980s onwards and was for a while the largest shopping centre in Ireland. The others are Blanchardstown Shopping Centre, Liffey Valley Shopping Centre and Dundrum Town Centre.

The opening of the centre would be the first of many new developments in the area over the coming years. Technological University Dublin, the National Basketball Arena (The Arena), the Civic Theatre and Tallaght University Hospital all opened within a few years of the shopping centre.

The centre celebrated its 25th anniversary on 23 October 2015. The centre was later granted permission by An Bord Pleanála for a major redevelopment to the centre. The proposed project would add about 200,000 square feet of retail space.

On 23 October 2020, it was announced that the planned expansion of The Square had been postponed, with management Sigma Retail Partners blaming the COVID-19 pandemic.

== Facilities ==
The interior atrium of the Square

The Square is not only a commercial but also a civic centre, the Office of the Revenue Commissioners had an office there as does the Department of Social Protection, the Health Service Executive (HSE) the Eastern Region and FÁS share a building on the car park of level one. In addition, both the headquarters of South Dublin County Council and the Tallaght branch of South Dublin Libraries are adjacent to the site. The Civic Theatre is located close to The Square Town centre, which hosts theatre, music, dance, opera and comedy. The Tallaght University Hospital is located 250m from the Square.

It has 3 floors, surface and multi-storey car parks, with the scenic lifts in the centre locally notorious for breakdowns and due to a woman suing the centre, the lifts have been replaced over 3 times.

== Public transport ==
The centre is served by the Luas Red Line, and the nearest stop for the shopping centre is the terminus at Tallaght.

The Square Shopping Centre is also served by various bus routes, such as the 27, 56a, 65, 65a, 77a, 82, and F1 which are operated by Dublin Bus and link The Square to the city centre. Meanwhile, Go-Ahead Ireland provide orbital routes, such as the S6, S8, W2, W4, and W6, that link The Square to other local areas, such as Dundrum, UCD, Blackrock, Sandyford, Dún Laoghaire, Clondalkin, Lucan, Blanchardstown, Citywest, Newcastle and Maynooth

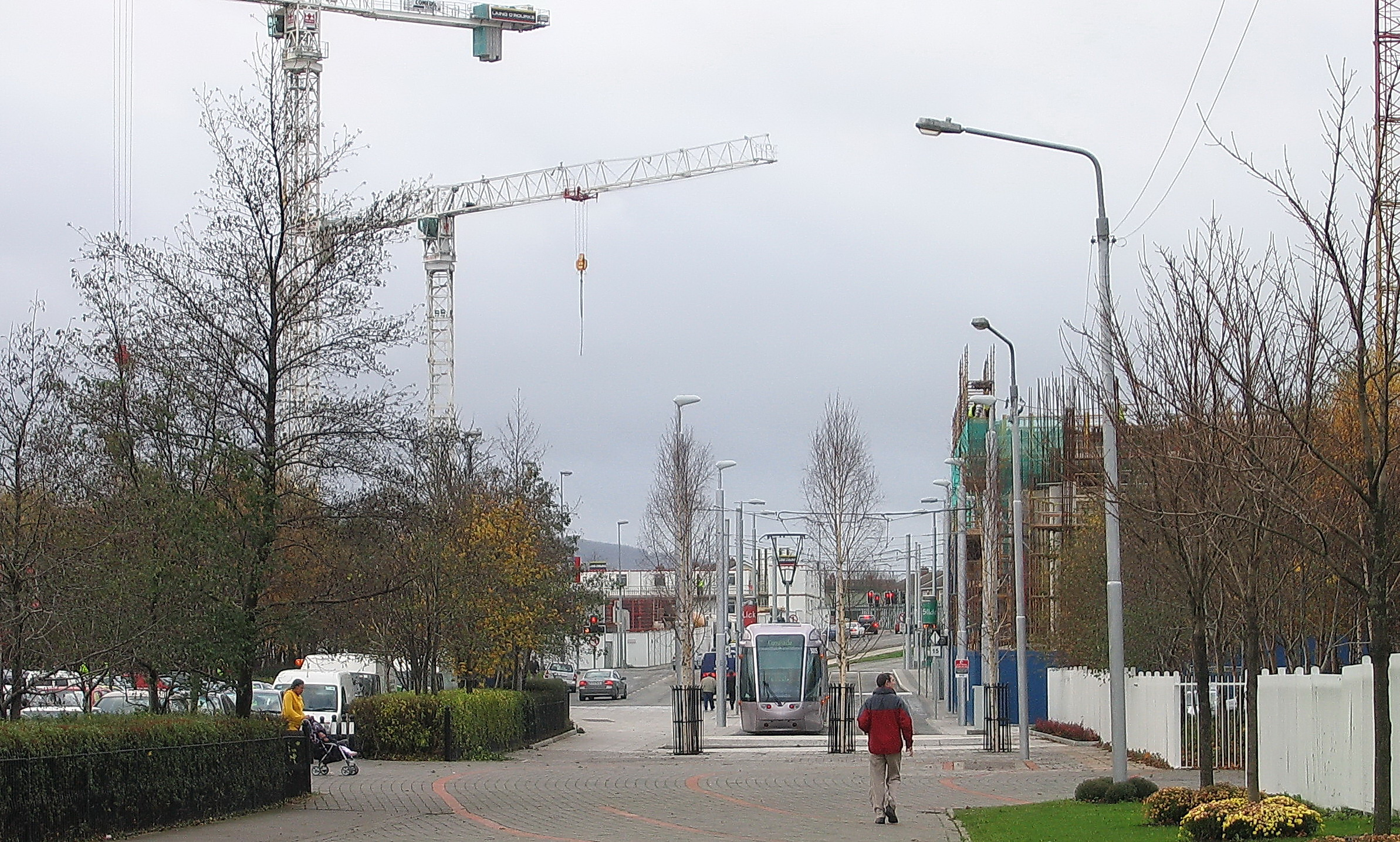
LUAS Red Line terminus near The Square
