= 1365 =

1365 in various calendars
- Gregorian calendar: 1365; MCCCLXV
- Ab urbe condita: 2118
- Armenian calendar: 814; ԹՎ ՊԺԴ
- Assyrian calendar: 6115
- Balinese saka calendar: 1286–1287
- Bengali calendar: 771–772
- Berber calendar: 2315
- English Regnal year: 38 Edw. 3 – 39 Edw. 3
- Buddhist calendar: 1909
- Burmese calendar: 727
- Byzantine calendar: 6873–6874
- Chinese calendar: 甲辰年 (Wood Dragon); 4062 or 3855 — to — 乙巳年 (Wood Snake); 4063 or 3856
- Coptic calendar: 1081–1082
- Discordian calendar: 2531
- Ethiopian calendar: 1357–1358
- Hebrew calendar: 5125–5126
- Hindu calendars
- Vikram Samvat: 1421–1422
- Shaka Samvat: 1286–1287
- Kali Yuga: 4465–4466
- Holocene calendar: 11365
- Igbo calendar: 365–366
- Iranian calendar: 743–744
- Islamic calendar: 766–767
- Japanese calendar: Jōji 4 (貞治４年)
- Javanese calendar: 1278–1279
- Julian calendar: 1365; MCCCLXV
- Korean calendar: 3698
- Minguo calendar: 547 before ROC 民前547年
- Nanakshahi calendar: −103
- Thai solar calendar: 1907–1908
- Tibetan calendar: ཤིང་ཕོ་འབྲུག་ལོ་ (male Wood-Dragon); 1491 or 1110 or 338 — to — ཤིང་མོ་སྦྲུལ་ལོ་ (female Wood-Snake); 1492 or 1111 or 339

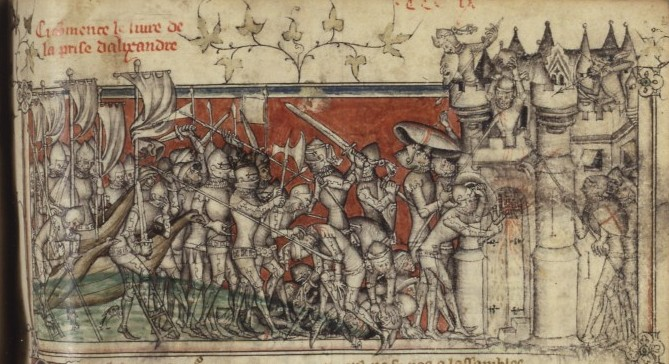
October 9: King Peter of Cyprus and Duke Amadeus of Savoy sack and pillage the Egyptian city of Alexandria.

Year 1365 (MCCCLXV) was a common year starting on Wednesday of the Julian calendar.

== Events ==
=== January–March ===
- January 20 – The English Parliament assembles at Westminster to begin a four week session but adjourns on February 17 without any legislation of record having been enacted.
- February 20 – In Italy, Paolo Alboino della Scala, Lord of Verona, is arrested on orders of his brother Cansignorio della Scala, on charges of "conjuring" and imprisoned for the rest of his life, before being strangled to death in 1375.
- February 25 – (6th waxing of Tabaung The Burmese King Thado Minbya proclaims the founding of the Kingdom of Ava at what are now the ruins of Inwa near what is now Manadalay in Myanmar.
- March 3 – At the Battle of Gataskogen, King Albrekt of Sweden defeats and captures the former King, Magnus Eriksson, whom he had overthrown on February 18, 1364, confirming his entitlement to the Sweden.
- March 6 – The Treaty of Pamplona is signed by King Carlos II of Navarre and King Charles V of France to begin a truce between the two kingdoms.
- March 12 – The University of Vienna is founded by Rudolf IV, Duke of Austria, commemorated more than 650 years later as the oldest university in the German-speaking world.

=== April–June ===
- April 12 – The Treaty of Guérande is signed at Guérande between the English Duke John IV of Brittany and King Charles V of France, ending the War of the Breton Succession after 24 years.
- May 14 – The Council of Apt is held in France between the archbishops and bishops of Arles, Embrun and Aix-en-Provence and results in the publication of 28 decrees, including the granting of 11 days of indulgence to persons who visit "with pious sentiments", the Church of the Blessed Virgin at Apt on the feast of the Exaltation of the Holy Cross and venerate there certain relics of the Cross.
- May 17 – Otto of Wittelsbach becomes the sole Elector of Brandenburg in the Holy Roman Empire upon the death of his brother, Ludwig II.
- May 28 – Raymond Berengar becomes the new Grand Master of the Knights Hospitaller upon the death of the Grand Master Roger de Pins, who had led the island of Rhodes since 1355.
- June 2 – The Hungarian occupation of Vidin begins, with the capture of the city by the forces of King Lajos of Hungary and the capture of the Tsar Ivan Sratsimir of Bulgaria, as a prisoner of war.
- June 4 – At a coronation ceremony held at the Church of St. Trophime at Arles, Charles IV, Holy Roman Emperor, is crowned as the King of the two Burgundies.
- June 27 – King Peter II of Cyprus and Duke Amadeus of Savoy depart from Venice in 165 ships to begin the Alexandrian Crusade to attack Egypt.

=== July–September ===
- July 21 – Marco Cornaro is elected as the new Doge of the Republic of Venice, three days after the death of Lorenzo Celsi.
- July 27 – Albrecht III and Leopold III become the joint rulers of the Duchy of Austria and the lands of the Habsburg family upon the death of their older brother, Rudolf IV.
- August 16 – The warlord Bolad Temür, who has held control of the court of the Yuan dyanasty Chinese Emperor Huizong as father of the ailing Empress Consort Bayan Khutugh, is assassinated by Bayan Dar on orders of the Emperor.
- September 8 – Öljei Khutuk, the Korean born wife of the Emperor Huizong of Yuan dynasty China, becomes his primary consort upon the death of at age 42 Huizong's primary wife, the Empress consort Bayan Khutugh. In December, Öljei is proclaimed by Huizong as the Empress Gi.

=== October–December ===
- October 9 – Alexandrian Crusade: The city of Alexandria in the Mamluk Sultanate of Egypt is sacked by an allied force of King Peter I of Cyprus and the knights of the Order of St. John of Jerusalem after a three day siege. After the killing of more than 20,000 civilians and the capturing of 5,000 others to be sold into slavery, the knights abandon Alexandria.
- November 22 – The Peace of Vordingborg is signed between representatives of the Kingdom of Denmark and the Hanseatic League to temporarily end the Danish–Hanseatic War. The war will resume in 1367.
- November 30 – The Nagarakretagama, a Javanese eulogy chronicling the journey of the Majapahit king, Hayam Wuruk, through his kingdom, is completed by Mpu Prapanca.
- December 6 – Edward the Black Prince, son of King Edward III of England, sends a letter to King Charles V of France demanding that the French monarch's intervention in Edward's conflict with Count Gaston III of Foix and threatening an armed conflict if Charles refuses.

=== Date unknown ===
- In modern-day southern India, Bahmani Sultan Mohammed Shah I invades the Vijayanagara Empire.
- Muhammed V begins building the Maristan of Granada (a hospital) in Granada (in modern-day Spain).
- The Chagatai Khanate defeats Timur in the Battle of Tashkent.

== Births ==
- January 27 – Edward of Angoulême, French-born royal prince of England (d. 1370)
- July 25 – U of Goryeo, Korean king (d. 1389)
- September 11 – Charles II, Duke of Lorraine, French noble (d. 1431)
- date unknown – Abd al-Karīm al-Jīlī, Baghdadi Sufi author (d. 1424)
- approximate date – Violant of Bar, queen regent of Aragon (d. 1431)

== Deaths ==
- March 8 – Princess Noguk of the Yuan dynasty and queen consort of Goryeo
- May 17 – Louis VI the Roman, Duke of Bavaria and Elector of Brandenburg (b. 1328)
- July 27 – Rudolf IV, Duke of Austria (b. 1339)
- December 8 – Nicholas II, Duke of Opava (b. 1288)
- date unknown – Zhu Derun, Chinese painter and poet (b. 1294)
