= 1369 =

1369 in various calendars
- Gregorian calendar: 1369; MCCCLXIX
- Ab urbe condita: 2122
- Armenian calendar: 818; ԹՎ ՊԺԸ
- Assyrian calendar: 6119
- Balinese saka calendar: 1290–1291
- Bengali calendar: 775–776
- Berber calendar: 2319
- English Regnal year: 42 Edw. 3 – 43 Edw. 3
- Buddhist calendar: 1913
- Burmese calendar: 731
- Byzantine calendar: 6877–6878
- Chinese calendar: 戊申年 (Earth Monkey); 4066 or 3859 — to — 己酉年 (Earth Rooster); 4067 or 3860
- Coptic calendar: 1085–1086
- Discordian calendar: 2535
- Ethiopian calendar: 1361–1362
- Hebrew calendar: 5129–5130
- Hindu calendars
- Vikram Samvat: 1425–1426
- Shaka Samvat: 1290–1291
- Kali Yuga: 4469–4470
- Holocene calendar: 11369
- Igbo calendar: 369–370
- Iranian calendar: 747–748
- Islamic calendar: 770–771
- Japanese calendar: Ōan 2 (応安２年)
- Javanese calendar: 1282–1283
- Julian calendar: 1369; MCCCLXIX
- Korean calendar: 3702
- Minguo calendar: 543 before ROC 民前543年
- Nanakshahi calendar: −99
- Thai solar calendar: 1911–1912
- Tibetan calendar: ས་ཕོ་སྤྲེ་ལོ་ (male Earth-Monkey); 1495 or 1114 or 342 — to — ས་མོ་བྱ་ལོ་ (female Earth-Bird); 1496 or 1115 or 343

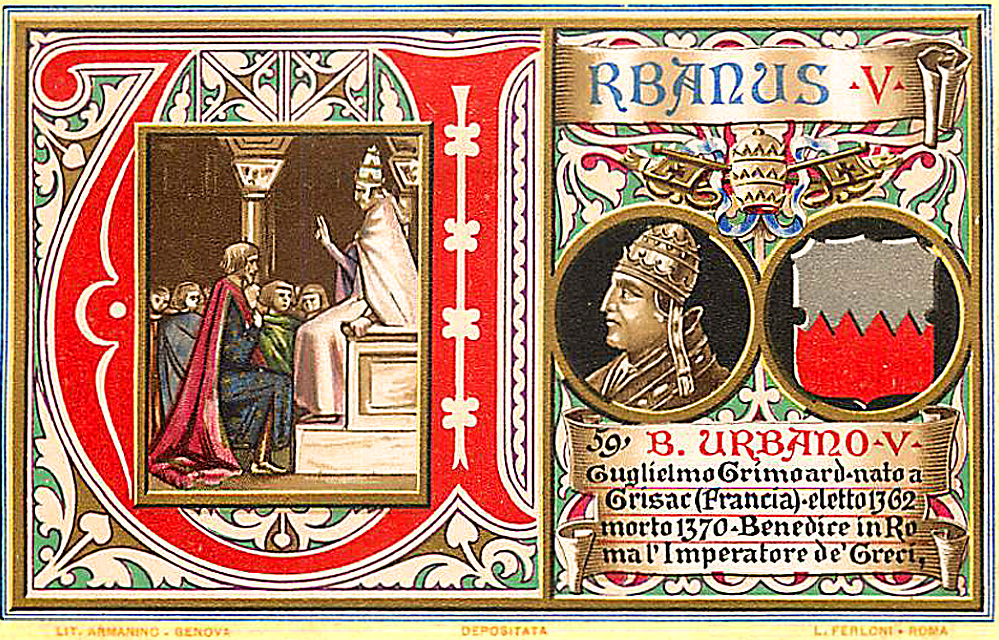
October 18: Patriarch John V of Eastern Orthodox Christians agrees to recognize Pope Urban V of the Western Roman Catholic Church as leader of all Christians, unsuccessfully proposing the end of the Great Schism.

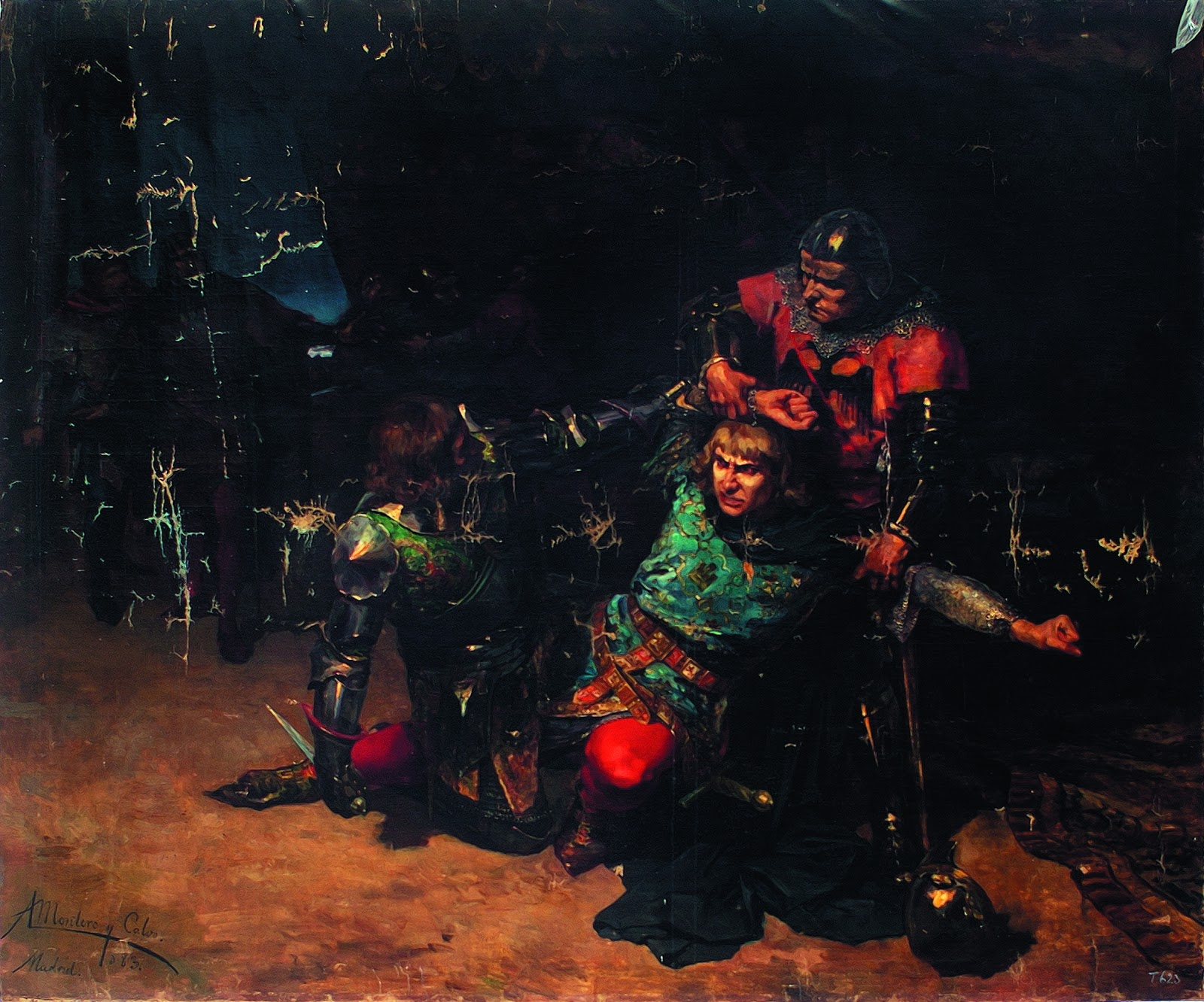
March 14: Bertrand du Guesclin betrays and kills King Pedro of the Cruel of Castile.

Year 1369 (MCCCLXIX) was a common year starting on Monday of the Julian calendar.

== Events ==
=== January–March ===
- January 17 – Peter the Fat becomes the new King of Cyprus when his father, King Peter I, is stabbed to death while in bed at the Palace of La Cava in Nicosia. The murder is carried out by a group of noblemen, led by Philip of Ibelin, Henry of Jubail, John of Gaurelle, and James of Nores, along with some outlaws freed from imprisonment earlier in the evening.
- January 25 – King Charles of France sends a summons to Edward the Black Prince, who is residing at Bordeaux, demanding that Edward appear before the King in Paris to answer for Edward's assessment of taxes on the people of Aquitaine. The Black Prince reportedly responds with the threat "We will willingly attend at Paris on the day appointed since the King of France sends for us, but it shall be with our helmet on our head and 60,000 men in our company".
- February 19 – Abu Ishaq Ibrahim II, the Muslim Caliph of Tunis, is killed in a shipwreck at the age of 32 and is succeeded by his 12-year-old son Abu-al-Baqa Khalid II.
- February – Vladislav I of Wallachia liberates Vidin from the Hungarians, resulting in the restoration of Ivan Sratsimir on the throne of Bulgaria, in the autumn.
- March 14 – King Pedro of Castile loses the Battle of Montiel to French soldiers led by Bertrand du Guesclin and Castilians led by his half-brother, Enrique. Pedro takes refuge in a fortress and offers du Guesclin 200,000 gold coins and a promise of several towns in Castile, in return for betraying Enrique. Afterwards, du Guesclin informs Enrique of the offer.
- March 18 – In a period of a few days, more than 800 communities in the Duchy of Aquitaine send requests to King Charles V of France for aid in escaping England's rule.
- March 23 – Enrique of Castile assassinates King Pedro of Castile after Pedro is betrayed by Bertrand du Guesclin.

=== April–June ===
- April 6 –
  - The city of Lucca in Italy pays the Holy Roman Emperor Charles V for the right for self-government, and Cardinal Guy de Montfort is appointed the imperial vicar to secure the debt.
  - King Edward III summons the members of the House of Lords and House of Commons to assemble on June 3 for a session of the English Parliament.
- April 13 – Joanna I of Naples, in her capacity as Countess of Provence, signs a treaty with Louis, Duke of Anjou to end the war between Anjou and Provence.
- April 15 – Saint Elzéar of Sabran (1285-1323) is canonized by Pope Urban V as a saint of the Roman Catholic Church.
- May 7 – Košice, in Slovakia, becomes the first town in Europe to be granted its own coat of arms as King Louis of Hungary grants the right in a charter in recognition of the city's assistance in the Battle of Rozhanovice.
- May 9 – At a meeting of the Estates General in Paris, the delegates approve the resumption of hostilities between France and England.
- May 21 – The Yuan dynasty Chinese warlord of Shaanxi province, Li Siqi, surrenders to the Ming dynasty Emperor Hongwu.
- May 25 – Dương Nhật Lễ becomes the new Emperor of Vietnam (Dai Viet) upon the death of the Emperor Trần Dụ Tông.
- May – King Charles V of France renounces the Treaty of Brétigny, and war is declared between France and England.
- June 3 – At the opening of the English Parliament at Westminster, King Edward III of England proclaims himself to the rightful heir to the throne of France after the Hundred Years' War is resumed by France's King Charles V.
- June 5 – Jean de Lusignan, regent for the King of Cyprus, uses his navy to attack Sidon in what is now Lebanon, but is then forced to retreat because of a storm.
- June 11 – The Parliament of England adjourns after eight days, as King Edward III gives royal assent to acts passed, removing the wool staple of Calais, as well as specifying limits to the import of wine from Gascoigne, and prohibiting the king's butler and lieutenants from taking "more wines than is commanded."
- June 19 – At Ghent, Philip the Bold, Duke of Burgundy and ruler of a realm that includes much of present-day Netherlands and Belgium, marries Margaret, daughter of Louis II of Flanders.
- June 27 – Thomas de Brantingham succeeds John Barnet as the Lord High Treasurer of England.

=== July–September ===
- July 9 – Lusignan of Cyprus leads the Cypriots in an unsuccessful attack on Alexandria in Egypt, then retreats, attacks Sidon again on July 19 and then is force by the weather to return to Cyprus, landing back at Famagusta on July 22.
- July 20 –
  - In the continued conquest of Yuan dynasty China by the Ming dynasty, General Chang Yuchun captures the Yuan capital, Shangdu, forcing the Yuan Emperor Huizong to flee further northward.
  - The kingdoms of England and Scotland sign a 14-year-truce.Dowden, John (1912). The Bishops of Scotland. Glasgow: J. Maitland Thomson.
- August 15 – Philippa of Hainault, wife of King Edward III, dies after 39 years as Queen consort of England.
- August 23 – John of Gaunt, Duke of Lancaster, lands with English troops at Calais to begin a raid in France while Philip the Bold, Duke of Burgundy, assembles troops to confront the English invasion. The standoff continues while Lancaster waits for additional troops from the Earl of Warwick.
- August 24 – Danish–Hanseatic War (1361–1370): After an 18-month siege by the armies of the Hanseatic League and the Kingdom of Sweden, Denmark recaptures Lindholmen Castle and forces a retreat by King Albert of Sweden along with the Hansa and Swedish forces.
- August 29 – Vladislav I of Wallachia obtains, by permission from the King of Hungary, control of the Transylvanian duchies of Almas and Fagaras
- September 2 – Philip the Bold, Duke of Burgundy, is forced to disband the army that he had assembled to capture Normandy from the control of England, after being ordered by King Charles V of France.
- September 22 – Ludovico II Gonzaga becomes the new Lord of Mantua upon the death of his father, Guido Gonzaga.
- September 29 – The Treaty of Scharding is signed between Duke Albrecht III of Austria and Duke Stephen II of Bavaria to end the dispute over control of Tyrol.
- September – Hundred Years' War: The French burn Portsmouth, England; the English raid Picardy and Normandy.

=== October–December ===
- October 18 – John V Palaiologos, partiarch of Constantinople and leader of the Eastern Orthodox Christian faith, meets in Rome with the Roman Catholic Pope Urban V and agrees to recognize the Pope as the leader of all Christendom, after negotiation between Rome and Constantinople had been made by Demetrios Chrysoloras.
- November 30 – Hundred Years' War: Charles V of France recaptures most of Aquitaine from the English.
- December 7 – The Estates General in France approves the request by King Charles V to raise taxes in order to finance the renewed war with England.
- December 25 – Frederick the Simple, King of Sicily, issues an order on Christmas Day directing all Jews on the island to wear a red badge identifying their heritage.S. O. "Sicily". The Jewish Encyclopedia. p. 324. "The wearing of a special badge was ordered by the same monarch on Dec. 25, 1369. The badge consisted of piece of red material, not smaller than the largest royal seal; men were required to wear it, under the chin, and women on the breast."
- December – Financed by Charles V of France, Welshman Owain Lawgoch launches an invasion fleet against the English, in an attempt to claim the throne of Wales.A storm causes Owain to abandon the invasion.

=== Dates unknown ===
- The Ottoman Empire invades Bulgaria.
- The Ottomans capture Adrianople (the modern-day city of Edirne) from the Byzantine Empire, reducing its territory to the city of Constantinople, Thessaloniki, part of the Peloponessus, and some islands. Adrianopole becomes the capital city of the Ottoman Sultanate.
- Venice repels a Hungarian invasion.
- The Thai Ayutthaya Kingdom incursions Cambodia for a second time.
- Charles V of France orders Hugues Aubriot to construct the fortress of the Bastille in Paris.
- Timur names the city of Samarkand as the capital of his empire.
- The Hongwu Emperor of the Chinese Ming dynasty issues a decree ordering every country magistrate in the empire to open a Confucian school of learning.
- The official production of Jingdezhen porcelain in Ming dynasty China is on record.

== Births ==
- January/February – Pope Martin V (d. 1431)
- May 28th – Muzio Sforza, Italian condottiero (d. 1424)
- date unknown – William de Ros, 6th Baron de Ros, Lord Treasurer of England (d. 1414)
- probable – King Constantine I of Georgia (d. c. 1412)
- approximate – Jan Hus, Czech priest and philosopher (d. 1415)
- approximate – Margareta, Swedish Sami missionary (d. 1425)

== Deaths ==
- January 17 – King Peter I of Cyprus (murdered) (b. 1328)
- March 23 – King Peter of Castile (b. 1334) (murdered after the battle of Montiel)
- August 15 – Philippa of Hainault, queen of Edward III of England (b. 1311) (dropsy)
- October 3 – Margaret, Countess of Tyrol (b. 1318)
- November 13 – Thomas Beauchamp, 11th Earl of Warwick
- date unknown
  - Sir John Chandos, English knight
  - Agnes Dunbar, Countess of Moray
  - Magnus I, Duke of Brunswick-Lüneburg
  - Ramathibodi I, first king of Ayutthaya (b. 1314)
