= 1380s =

Decade

The 1380s was a decade of the Julian Calendar which began on January 1, 1380, and ended on December 31, 1389.

== Events ==
=== 1380 ===
==== January–December ====
- February – Olaf II of Denmark also becomes Olaf IV of Norway, with his mother Margrete (Margaret) as regent. Iceland and the Faroe Islands, as parts of Norway, pass under the Danish crown.
- March 13 – The southern England town of Winchelsea in East Sussex is attacked and burned by an expeditionary force from France for a second time.
- May 31 – Grand Duke of Lithuania Jogaila signs the secret Treaty of Dovydiškės, with the Teutonic Knights. This sparks a civil war with his uncle Kęstutis.
- June 21 – Battle of Chioggia: the Venetian fleet defeats the Genoese.
- September 8 – Battle of Kulikovo: Russian forces under Grand Prince Dmitry Donskoy of Moscow resist a large invasion by the Blue Horde, Lithuania and Ryazan, stopping their advance.
- September 16 – Charles V of France is succeeded by his twelve-year-old son, Charles VI.
- October 2 – Caterina Visconti marries her first cousin, Gian Galeazzo Visconti, later Duke of Milan, at the Church of San Giovanni in Conca.
- November 3 – Charles VI of France, who succeeded his father (Charles V of France) in September, is crowned.

==== Date unknown ====
- Sir William Walworth, a member of the Fishmongers Guild, becomes Lord Mayor of London for the second time.
- Khan Tokhtamysh of the White Horde dethrones Mamai of the Blue Horde. The two hordes unite to form the Golden Horde.
- Karim Al-Makhdum arrives in Jolo, and builds a mosque.
- The Hongwu Emperor purges the chancellor of China, Hu Weiyong, and abolishes that office, as he imposes direct imperial rule over the six ministries of central government, for the Ming Empire.
- The last islands of Polynesia are discovered and inhabited.
- The Companhia das Naus is founded by King Ferdinand I of Portugal.
- The imposter Paul Palaiologos Tagaris, having been appointed Latin Patriarch of Constantinople by Pope Urban VI, takes up residence in his see at Chalcis.

=== 1381 ===
==== January–December ====
- March 14 – Chioggia concludes an alliance with Zadar and Trogir against Venice, which becomes changed in 1412 in Šibenik.
- June 12 – Peasants' Revolt: In England, rebels from Kent and Essex, led by Wat Tyler and Jack Straw, meet at Blackheath. There the rebels are encouraged by a sermon, by renegade priest John Ball.
- June 14 – Peasants' Revolt: Rebels destroy John of Gaunt's Savoy Palace in London and storm the Tower of London, beheading Simon Sudbury, who is both Archbishop of Canterbury and Lord Chancellor, and also Robert Hales, Lord High Treasurer. King Richard II of England (age 14) meets the leaders of the revolt and agrees to reforms such as fair rents and the abolition of serfdom.
- June 15 – Peasants' Revolt: During further negotiations, Wat Tyler is murdered by the King's entourage. Noble forces subsequently overpower the rebel army. The rebel leaders are eventually captured and executed and Richard II revokes his concessions. The revolt is discussed in John Gower's Vox Clamantis and Froissart's Chronicles.
- August – Kęstutis overthrows his nephew, Jogaila, as Grand Duke of Lithuania. Jogaila is allowed to remain as governor of eastern Lithuania. This marks the beginning of the Lithuanian Civil War (1381–84).

==== Date not known ====
- Due to Joanna I of Naples' support for Antipope Clement VII, Pope Urban VI bestows Naples upon Charles of Durazzo. With the help of the Hungarians, Charles advances on Naples and captures Joanna. James of Baux, the ruler of Taranto and the Latin Empire, claims the Principality of Achaea after Joanna's imprisonment.
- After a naval battle, Venice wins the three-year War of Chioggia against Genoa. The Genoans are permanently weakened by the conflict.
- Hajji I succeeds Alah-ad-Din Ali as Mamluk Sultan of Egypt. The Egyptian government continues to be controlled by rebel leader Barquq.
- Timur conquers east Persia, ending the rule of the Sarbadar dynasty.
- Sonam Drakpa deposes Drakpa Changchub as ruler of Tibet.
- The Ming dynasty of China annexes the areas of the old Kingdom of Dali, in modern-day Yunnan and Guizhou provinces, inhabited by the Miao and Yao peoples. Hundreds of thousands of Chinese (including military colonists) will migrate there from the rest of China.
- In Ming dynasty China, the lijia census registration system begun in 1371 is now universally imposed, during the reign of the Hongwu Emperor. The census counts 59,873,305 people living in China in this year. This depicts a drastic drop in population since the Song dynasty, which counted 100 million people at its height in the early 12th century. A modern historian states that the Ming census is inaccurate, as China at around this time has at least 65,000,000 inhabitants, if not 75,000,000.

=== 1382 ===
==== January–December ====
- January 20 – Princess Anne of Bohemia, a daughter of the late Charles IV, Holy Roman Emperor, becomes the Queen Consort of England by marrying King Richard II; the marriage produces no heirs before her death in 1395.
- May 12 – Charles of Durazzo executes the imprisoned Joanna I of Naples, and succeeds her as Charles III of Naples.
- May 21 – John Wycliffe's teachings are condemned by the Synod of London, which becomes known as the "Earthquake Synod", after its meetings are disrupted by an earthquake.
- August – The iconic painting the Black Madonna of Częstochowa is brought from Jerusalem, to the Jasna Góra Monastery in Poland.
- September – Following the death of Louis I of Hungary and Poland:
  - Louis' daughter Mary is crowned the "King" of Hungary.
  - The Poles, who do not wish to be ruled by Mary's fiancee, the future Holy Roman Emperor Sigismund, choose Mary's younger sister, Jadwiga, to become ruler of Poland. After two years of negotiations, Jadwiga is eventually crowned "King" in 1384.
- September 30 – The inhabitants of Trieste (now in northern Italy) donate their city to Duke Leopold III of Austria.
- October – James I succeeds his nephew, Peter II, as King of Cyprus.
- October 20 – Winchester College is founded in England.
- November 27 – Battle of Roosebeke: A French army under Louis II, Count of Flanders defeats the Flemings, led by Philip van Artevelde.
- November 27 – After a five-year revolt, Barquq deposes Hajji II as Mamluk Sultan of Egypt, marking the end of the Bahri Dynasty and Qalawunid Dynasty, and the start of the Burji Dynasty.

==== Date unknown ====
Ming dynasty conquest of Yunnan

- Khan Tokhtamysh of the Golden Horde overruns Muscovy, as punishment for Grand Prince Dmitry Donskoy's resistance to Khan Mamai of the Blue Horde in the 1370s. Dmitry Donskoy pledges his loyalty to Tokhtamysh, and is allowed to remain as ruler of Moscow and Vladimir.
- The Ottomans take Sofia from the Bulgarians.
- Ibrahim I is selected to succeed Husheng, as Shah of Shirvan (now Azerbaijan).
- Kęstutis, the Grand Duke of Lithuania, is taken prisoner by former Grand Duke Jogaila, whilst meeting him to hold negotiations. Kęstutis is subsequently murdered, and Jogaila regains the rule of Lithuania.
- Ahmed deposes his brother, Hussain, as ruler of the Jalayirid Dynasty in western Persia.
- Rana Lakha succeeds Rana Kshetra Singh, as ruler of Mewar (now part of western India).
- Conrad Zöllner von Rothenstein succeeds Winrich von Kniprode, as Grand Master of the Teutonic Knights.
- Balša II of Zeta conquers Albania.
- Dawit I succeeds his brother Newaya Maryam, as Emperor of Ethiopia.
- Abraham bar Garib becomes Syriac Orthodox Patriarch of Mardin.

=== 1383 ===
==== January–December ====
- May 17 – King John I of Castile and Leon marries Beatrice of Portugal.
- July 7 – James of Baux, ruler of Taranto and Achaea, and last titular Latin Emperor, dies childless. As a result:
  - Charles III of Naples becomes ruler of Achaea (modern-day southern Greece).
  - Otto, Duke of Brunswick-Grubenhagen, the widower of Joanna I of Naples, becomes ruler of Taranto (eastern Italy).
  - Louis I, Duke of Anjou inherits the claim to the Latin Empire (western Turkey), but never uses the title of Emperor.
- October 22 – King Fernando I of Portugal dies, and is succeeded by his daughter, Beatrice of Portugal. A period of civil war and anarchy, known as the 1383–85 Crisis, begins in Portugal, due to Beatrice being married to King John I of Castile and Leon.

==== Date unknown ====
- The Teutonic Knights recommence war against pagan Lithuania.
- Dan I succeeds his father Radu as Prince of Wallachia. He is the ancestor of the House of Dăneşti.
- Rao Chanda succeeds Rao Biram Dev as Rathore ruler of Marwar (in modern-day western India).
- Löwenbräu beer is first brewed.
- Completion of the original inner courtyard of Farleigh Hungerford Castle in Somersetshire, England.
- The Wat Phra That Doi Suthep Temple is built in modern-day Thailand, by King Kuena of Lanna.
- Construction of the Bastille fortress is completed in Paris, France.

=== 1384 ===
==== January–December ====
- May – September 3 – Siege of Lisbon by the Castilian army, during the 1383–85 Crisis in Portugal.
- August 16 – The Hongwu Emperor of Ming China hears a case of a couple who tore paper money notes, while fighting over them. Under the law, this is considered to be destroying stamped government documents, which is to be punished by a caning with a bamboo rod of 100 strokes. However, the Emperor decides to pardon them, on the grounds that it was unintentional.
- November 16 – 10-year-old Jadwiga is crowned "King" of Poland in Kraków following the death of her father, King Louis, in 1382.
- December 25 – Use of the Spanish era dating system in the Crown of Castile is suppressed.

====== Unknown Date ======
- The Hongwu Emperor of China reinstates the Imperial examination system for drafting scholar-officials to the civil service, after suspending the system since 1373, in favor of a recommendation system to office.
- The Nasrid princes of Al-Andalus replace Abu al-Abbas with Abu Faris Musa ibn Faris, as ruler of the Marinid dynasty in modern-day Morocco.
- Zain Al-Abidin succeeds his father, Shah Shuja, as ruler of the Muzaffarids in central Persia.
- Shortly before his death, John Wycliffe sends out tracts against Pope Urban VI, who has not turned out to be the reformist Wycliffe had hoped.
- Qara Muhammad succeeds Bairam Khawaja, as ruler of the Kara Koyunlu ("Black Sheep Turkomans"), in modern-day Armenia and northern Iraq.
- Timur conquers the northern territories of the Jalayirid Empire, in western Persia.
- Katharine Lady Berkeley's School is founded in Gloucestershire, England.

=== 1385 ===
==== January–December ====
- July 17 – Charles VI of France marries Isabeau of Bavaria; the wedding is celebrated with France's first court ball.
- August 6 – Edmund of Langley is elevated to become the first Duke of York in England.
- August 14
  - Battle of Aljubarrota: John of Aviz defeats John I of Castile in the decisive battle of the 1383–85 Crisis in Portugal. John of Aviz is crowned King John I of Portugal, ending Queen Beatrice's rule, and Portugal's independence from the Kingdom of Castile is secured.
  - The Union of Krewo establishes the Jagiellonian dynasty in Poland and Lithuania, through the proposed marriage of Queen regnant Jadwiga of Poland and Grand Duke Jogaila of Lithuania, and sees the acceptance of Roman Catholicism by the Lithuanian elite, and an end to the Greater Poland Civil War.
- August 31 – King Richard II of England begins an invasion of Scotland. The English burn Holyrood and Edinburgh, but return home without a decisive battle.
- September 18 – Battle of Savra: Serbian forces under Balša II and Ivaniš Mrnjavčević are defeated by Ottoman commander Hayreddin Pasha, near Berat.
- October 15 – Battle of Valverde: The armies of Portugal defeat Castile.
- December – A group of Hungarian nobles helps Charles III of Naples to overthrow Queen Mary, as ruler of Hungary and Croatia.

==== Date unknown ====
- Tokhtamysh of the Golden Horde conquers parts of the Jalayirid Sultanate in western Persia, causing a rift between himself and Timur of the Timurid Empire, who had also wanted to conquer Persia.
- Olav IV of Norway is elected as titular King of Sweden, in opposition to the unpopular King Albert.
- The Hongwu Emperor of China's Ming dynasty relents after eighteen tribute missions over the previous eight years, and agrees to invest King U of Goryeo.
- Construction of:
  - Castello Estense in Ferrara (modern-day Italy)
  - Bodiam Castle (East Sussex, England)

=== 1386 ===
==== January–December ====
- February 24 – Elizabeth of Bosnia, the mother of the overthrown Queen Mary of Hungary and Croatia, arranges the assassination of Charles III of Naples, the ruler of Hungary, Naples, Achaea and Croatia, with the result that:
  - Mary is reinstated as Queen of Hungary and Croatia.
  - Charles' son, Ladislaus, becomes King of Naples.
  - A period of interregnum begins in Achaea, lasting until 1396. The rule of Achaea is sought by numerous pretenders, none of whom can be considered to have reigned.
- March 4 – Grand Duke of Lithuania Jogaila (having been baptised on February 15 in Wawel Cathedral, Kraków, and on February 18 married Jadwiga, 12-year-old queen regnant of Poland) is crowned Władysław II Jagiełło, King of Poland, beginning the Jagiellonian dynasty.
- May 9 – King John I of Portugal and King Richard II of England ratify the Treaty of Windsor.
- May 20 – Earliest recorded mention of the city of Pitești, in modern-day Romania.
- July 9 – Battle of Sempach: The Swiss safeguard independence from Habsburg rule.
- July – John of Gaunt leaves England to make good his claim to the throne of Castile by right of his second marriage to Constanza of Castile in 1371.
- September 23 – Dan I of Wallachia (modern-day southern Romania) is killed in battle against the Bulgarians and is succeeded by Mircea the Elder, one of the greatest rulers of Wallachia.
- October 18 – Heidelberg University (Ruprecht-Karls-Universität Heidelberg), the oldest in Germany, is founded at the behest of Rupert I, Elector Palatine, by charter of Pope Urban VI.
- November 21 – Timur's invasions of Georgia: Timurid dynasty Turco-Mongol leader Timur captures and sacks the Georgian capital of Tbilisi, taking King Bagrat V prisoner.

==== Date unknown ====
- The mother and sister of Queen Jadwiga of Poland are kidnapped by rebels in Hungary-Croatia.
- Abu al-Abbas is reinstated as ruler of the Marinid dynasty in modern-day Morocco.
- The Republic of Venice takes control of the island of Corfu.
- Construction begins on the Brancacci Chapel in Florence.
- Rozhdestvensky monastery is built in Muscovy.

=== 1387 ===
==== January–December ====
- Elizabeta Kotromanic, mother of Mary, Queen of Hungary and the regent of Hungary, is murdered in prison by the Croatian rebels (her daughter is liberated on 4 June).
- January 1 – Charles III ascends to the throne of Navarre, after the death of his father, Charles II.
- January 5 – John I succeeds his father, Peter IV, as King of Aragon and Valencia, and forms an alliance with France and Castile.
- March 11 – Battle of Castagnaro: Padua, led by John Hawkwood, is victorious over Giovanni Ordelaffi of Verona.
- March 24–25 – Battle of Margate off the coast of Margate: The Kingdom of England is victorious over a Franco-Castilian-Flemish fleet.
- June 2 – John Holland, a maternal half-brother of Richard II of England, is created Earl of Huntingdon.
- August 22 – Olaf, King of Norway and Denmark and claimant to the throne of Sweden, dies. The vacant thrones come under the regency of his mother Margaret I of Denmark, who will soon become queen in her own right.
- September 27 – Petru of Moldavia pays homage to Władysław II Jagiełło, making Moldavia a Polish fief (which it will remain until 1497).
- December 19 – Battle of Radcot Bridge: Forces loyal to Richard II of England are defeated by a group of rebellious barons known as the Lords Appellant. Richard II is imprisoned, until he agrees to replace all the councillors in his court.

==== Date unknown ====
- Timur conquers the Muzaffarid Empire in central Persia, and appoints three puppet rulers.
- Khan Tokhtamysh of the Golden Horde invades the Timurid Empire, but has to withdraw soon after, due to heavy snow.
- Maghan II succeeds his brother, Musa II, as Mansa of the Mali Empire

=== 1388 ===
==== January–December ====
- February – The entire court of Richard II of England are convicted of treason by the Merciless Parliament, under the influence of the Lords Appellant, and are all either executed or exiled. Richard II effectively becomes a puppet of the Lords Appellant.
- April 9 – Battle of Näfels: Glarus, in alliance with the Old Swiss Confederacy, decisively defeat the Habsburgs, despite being outnumbered sixteen to one.
- May 18 – Battle of Buyur Lake: A Chinese Ming invasion force under General Lan Yu defeats a large Mongolian army under Uskhal Khan Tögüs Temür, and captures 100 members of the Northern Yuan Dynasty. Uskhal Khan is killed whilst trying to escape, and is succeeded as Khan of Mongolia by his rival, Jorightu. The invading Chinese army destroys Karakorum, the capital of the Mongol Empire.
- August 5 – Battle of Otterburn: A Scottish army, led by James Douglas, defeats an English army, capturing their leader, Harry Hotspur. Douglas is killed during the battle.
- August 27 – Battle of Bileća: The Bosnians check the Ottoman advance.
- December 12 – Maria of Enghien sells the Lordship of Argos and Nauplia to the Republic of Venice.

==== Date unknown ====
- Mircea I of Wallachia takes control of the region of Dobruja, thus preventing its occupation by the Ottomans.
- Petru of Moldavia receives Pokuttya, as a pawn for a loan to the Polish king.
- The revision of Wycliffe's Bible is completed by John Purvey, and Wyclif's followers, known as the Lollards, begin to be persecuted in England.
- John of Gaunt, the uncle of Richard II of England, makes peace with Castile and gives up his claim to the Castilian throne, by allowing his daughter Catherine of Lancaster to marry Prince Henry, the eldest son of John I of Castile.
- The title of Prince of Asturias is created.
- Ramesuan is reinstated as King of Ayutthaya (modern-day southern Thailand), after dethroning and executing 17-year-old King Thong Lan.
- Goryeo Revolution: General Yi Seong-gye begins a four year revolution in Goryeo (modern-day Korea), after being ordered by King U of Goryeo to attack the superior Chinese army. King U is forced from power, and replaced by his son Chang.
- Tran Ngung overthrows Tran Hien as King of Vietnam.
- Omar I is succeeded by Sa'id, as King of the Kanem-Bornu Empire (modern-day east Chad and Nigeria). Sa'id is succeeded in the same year by Kade Alunu. Omar and Sa'id are both killed by Bilala invaders from the west.
- Ghiyas-ud-Din Tughluq II succeeds Firuz Shah Tughlaq as Sultan of Delhi.
- Charles VI of France takes complete control of the government, ending the regency of his uncle, Philip the Bold.
- The University of Cologne is established; by the 21st century it will be the largest university in Germany.
- Cozia Monastery is built in Wallachia.
- Ljubostinja Monastery is built in Serbia.

=== 1389 ===
==== January–December ====
- February 24 – Queen Margaret of Norway and Denmark defeats Albert, King of Sweden in battle and becomes ruler of all three kingdoms. Albert is deposed from the Swedish throne and taken prisoner.
- May 3 – Richard II takes control of England, away from the Lords Appellant.
- May 19 – Vasili I becomes Grand Prince of Moscow after the death of his father, Dmitry Donskoy.
- June – The Käpplinge murders take place in Stockholm in Sweden.
- June 15 – Battle of Kosovo: The Ottoman Empire and the Serbs fight an inconclusive battle, with both sides suffering heavy losses. Both Sultan Murad I and Serbian Prince Lazar are killed in the battle.
  - Bayezid I (1389–1402) succeeds his father Murad I (1362–1389), as Ottoman Sultan.
  - Stefan III succeeds his father, as ruler of Serbia.
- July 18 – Hundred Years' War: The kingdoms of England and France sign the Truce of Leulinghem, ending the second phase of the war, and bringing a 13-year peace.
- November 2 – Pope Boniface IX succeeds Pope Urban VI, as the 203rd pope.

==== Date unknown ====
- Mircea I of Wallachia and Polish king Władysław II Jagiełło sign their first treaty, to protect their countries against Ottoman expansion.
- Goryeo Revolution in Korea (1388–1392): King Chang of Goryeo is forced from power and replaced by King Gongyang. The ten-year-old Chang and his predecessor, U, are both assassinated later in the year.
- Hadji II is restored as Mamluk Sultan of Egypt, after overthrowing Sultan Barquq.
- With the backing of Antipope John XXIII, supporters of Louis II overthrow the underage King Ladislaus as King of Naples. The new Pope Boniface IX recognises Ladislaus's claim to the throne.
- Wikramawardhana succeeds Hayam Wuruk, as ruler of the Majapahit Empire.
- The unpopular Sultan Tughluq Khan of Delhi is murdered and succeeded by his brother, Abu Bakr Shah.
- Biri II succeeds Kade Alunu as King of the Kanem-Bornu Empire (now eastern Chad and Nigeria), and the Empire loses its land in present-day Chad to the Bilala.
- Sandaki overthrows Magha II, as Mansa of the Mali Empire.
- Abd ar-Rahmân II succeeds Musa II as ruler of the Ziyanid Dynasty, in present-day western Algeria.
- Abu Tashufin II succeeds his nephew, Abu Hammu II, as ruler of the Abdalwadid Dynasty in present-day eastern Algeria.
- Carmo Convent is built in Lisbon, Portugal.

== Births ==
1380

- February 11 – Gian Francesco Poggio Bracciolini, Italian humanist (d. 1459)
- September 8 – Saint Bernardino of Siena, Italian Franciscan missionary (d. 1444)
- November 27 – King Ferdinand I of Aragon (d. 1416)
- date unknown
  - Abd al-Rahman ibn Muhammad al-Bistami, Ottoman Sufi (d. 1455)
  - Giovanni Berardi, Archbishop of Tarentum (d. 1449)
  - Nguyễn Trãi, Confucian scholar (d. 1442)
  - Anne de Bourbon, French noble (d. 1408)
  - Jan Želivský, Hussite priest (d. 1422)
- probable
  - Huitzilihuitl II, 2nd Tlatoani (king) of Tenochtitlan (modern Mexico City), 1396–1417, father of Moctezuma I (d. c. 1417)
  - Jamshīd al-Kāshī, Persian astronomer and mathematician (d. 1429)
  - King Lukeni lua Nimi of the Kingdom of Kongo (d. 1420)
  - Thomas à Kempis, German monk and writer (d. 1471)
  - Parameshvara, Indian mathematician (d. 1425)

1381

- January 13 – Colette of Corbie, French abbess and saint in the Catholic Church (d. 1447)
- October 13 – Thomas FitzAlan, 12th Earl of Arundel, English politician (d. 1415)
- date unknown
  - Anna of Celje, Queen consort of Poland (d. 1416)
  - Johann Schiltberger, German traveller and writer (d. 1440)
  - John I, Duke of Bourbon (d. 1434)
  - Saint Rita of Cascia (d. 1457)
  - Itzcóatl, fourth Tlatoani for the Mexica Empire (d. 1440)

1382

- January 23 – Richard de Beauchamp, 13th Earl of Warwick (d. 1439)
- date unknown
  - Frederick IV, Duke of Austria (d. 1439)
  - Joan, princess regent of Navarre (d. 1413)
  - Lope de Barrientos, powerful bishop in Castile
  - Dawit I of Ethiopia (d. 1413)
- probable – Eric of Pomerania, King of Norway, Sweden and Denmark (d. 1459)

1383

- April 30 – Anne of Gloucester, English countess, granddaughter of King Edward III of England (d. 1438)
- September 4
  - Antipope Felix V (d. 1451)
  - Amadeus VIII, Duke of Savoy (d. 1451)
- November 9 – Niccolò III d'Este, Marquis of Ferrara (d. 1441)
- date unknown – Pope Eugene IV (d. 1447)

1384

- August – Antoine, Duke of Brabant (d. 1415)
- August 11 – Yolande of Aragon (d. 1442)
- date unknown
  - St Frances of Rome (d. 1440)
  - Khalil Sultan, ruler of Transoxiana (d. 1411)
  - Sigismondo Polcastro, Italian physician and natural philosopher (d. 1473)

1385

- June 23 – Stephen, Count Palatine of Simmern-Zweibrücken (d. 1459)
- August 1 – John FitzAlan, 13th Earl of Arundel, English noble (d. 1421)
- August 15 – Richard de Vere, 11th Earl of Oxford, English noble (d. 1417)
- date unknown
  - Jean I, Duke of Alençon (d. 1415)
  - Jan van Eyck, Flemish painter (approximate date; d. 1441)
  - Margaret Holland, Duchess of Clarence, English noble (d. 1429)
  - Mircea I of Wallachia (d. 1418)

1386

- March 12 – Ashikaga Yoshimochi, Japanese shōgun (d. 1428)
- June 24 – Giovanni da Capistrano, Italian saint (d. 1456)
- August 9 or September 16 – King Henry V of England (d. 1422)
- date unknown – Niccolò Piccinino, Italian mercenary (d. 1444)
- probable – Donatello, Italian sculptor (d. 1466)

1387

- July 6 – Queen Blanche I of Navarre (d. 1441)
- date unknown – Henriette, Countess of Montbéliard, regent of Württemberg (d. 1444)

1388

- September 14 – Claudius Clavus, Danish geographer
- date unknown
  - Juliana Berners, English writer
  - Thomas of Lancaster, 1st Duke of Clarence, second son of Henry IV of England (d. 1421)
  - Thomas Montagu, 4th Earl of Salisbury (d. 1428)
  - Dai Jin, Chinese painter (d. 1462)
  - Yiğit Şahiner, Turkish musician, historian

1389

- March 1 – Antoninus of Florence, Italian archbishop (d. 1459)
- June 20 – John of Lancaster, 1st Duke of Bedford, regent of England (d. 1435)
- April 10 – Cosimo de' Medici, ruler of Florence (d. 1464)
- November 9 – Isabella of Valois, French princess and queen of England (d. 1409)
- December 5 – Zbigniew Oleśnicki, Polish cardinal and statesman (d. 1455)
- December 24 – John VI, Duke of Brittany (d. 1442)

== Deaths ==
1380

- April 29 – Saint Catherine of Siena, Italian theologian (b. 1347)
- May 5 – Saint Philotheos, Coptic martyr
- July 13 – Bertrand du Guesclin, Constable of France (b. c. 1320)
- July 26 – Emperor Kōmyō, former Emperor of Japan (b. 1322)
- September 16 – King Charles V of France (b. 1338)
- December 29 – Elizabeth of Poland, queen consort of Hungary (b. 1305)
- date unknown
  - Haakon VI of Norway (b. 1340)
  - Nissim of Gerona, Catalan rabbi (b. 1320)
  - Khadijah of the Maldives, sovereign sultan of the Maldives
  - Shams al-Dīn Abū Abd Allāh al-Khalīlī, Syrian astronomer (b. 1320)

1381

- March 24 – Catherine of Vadstena, Swedish saint (b. 1331 or 1332)
- May 15 – Eppelein von Gailingen, German robber baron
- June 14 – Simon Sudbury, Archbishop of Canterbury (murdered)
- June 15
  - John Cavendish, Lord Chief Justice of England (murdered)
  - Wat Tyler, English rebel (murdered)
- July 15 – John Ball, renegade priest (executed)
- December 2 – John of Ruysbroeck, Flemish mystic
- December 27 – Edmund Mortimer, 3rd Earl of March, English politician

1382

- January 5 – Philippa Plantagenet, Countess of Ulster (b. 1355)
- February 8 – Blanche of France, Duchess of Orléans (b. 1328)
- February 15 – William de Ufford, 2nd Earl of Suffolk (b. c. 1339)
- April 5 – Janusz Suchywilk, Polish nobleman
- May 12 – Queen Joanna I of Naples (b. 1327) (murdered)
- July 11 – Nicole Oresme, French philosopher (b. 1325)
- August 3 or August 15 – Kęstutis, Grand Duke of Lithuania (b. 1297)
- August 13 – Eleanor of Aragon, queen of John I of Castile (b. 1358)
- September 10 – King Louis I of Hungary (b. 1326)
- September 29 – 'Izz al-Din ibn Rukn al-Din Mahmud, malik of Sistan
- October 13 – King Peter II of Cyprus
- October 18 – James Butler, 2nd Earl of Ormond (b. 1331)
- November 27 – Philip van Artevelde, Flemish patriot (b. 1340) (killed in battle)
- Louis Fadrique, Count of Salona

date unknown – Newaya Maryam, Emperor of Ethiopia 1383

- March 1 – Amadeus VI, Count of Savoy (b. 1334)
- March 3 – Hugh III of Arborea
- June 5 – Dmitry Konstantinovich, Russian prince (b. 1324)
- June 8 – Thomas de Ros, 4th Baron de Ros, English Crusader (b. 1338)
- June 15 – John VI Kantakouzenos, Byzantine Emperor (b. 1292)
- July 7 James of Baux, titular Latin Emperor
- October 22 – King Fernando I of Portugal (b. 1345)
- December 7 – Wenceslaus I, Duke of Luxembourg (b. 1337)
- December 23 – Beatrice of Bourbon, Queen of Bohemia (b. 1320)
- date unknown – Radu I, Prince of Wallachia

1384

- January 30 – Louis II, Count of Flanders (b. 1330)
- May – William Douglas, 1st Earl of Douglas, Scottish magnate (b.c. 1327)
- June 8 – Kan'ami, Japanese actor and playwright (b. 1333)
- August 6 – Francesco I of Lesbos
- August 20 – Geert Groote, Dutch founder of the Brethren of the Common Life (b. 1340)
- September 10 – Joanna of Dreux, Countess of Penthievre and nominal Duchess of Brittany (b. 1319)
- September 20 – Louis I, Duke of Anjou (b. 1339)
- October – Joan Holland, Duchess of Brittany (b. 1350)
- December 23 – Thomas Preljubović, ruler of Epirus
- December 31 – John Wycliffe, English theologian, Bible translator and Catholic reform campaigner
- date unknown
  - John of Fordun, Scottish chronicler
  - Peter of Enghien, Count of Lecce
  - Ruaidri mac Tairdelbach Ó Conchobair, King of Connacht
- probable – Liubartas, King of Galicia
- Muhammad Jamaluddin al-Makki al-Amili al-Jizzini also known as al-Shahid al-Awwal, author of al-Lum'ah al-Dimashqiyah (b. ca 1334)

1385

- June 28 – Andronikos IV Palaiologos, co-ruler of the Byzantine Empire
- August 7 – Joan of Kent, Dowager Princess of Wales, widow of Edward, the Black Prince (b. 1328)
- September 18 – Balša II, ruler of Zeta
- October 15 – Dionysius I, Metropolitan of Moscow
- December 19 – Bernabò Visconti, Lord of Milan (b. 1319)
- date unknown
  - Xu Da, Chinese military leader (b. 1332)

1386

- July 9 – Leopold III, Duke of Austria (in battle) (b. 1351)
- August 20 – Bo Jonsson (Grip), royal marshal of Sweden
- September 23 – Dan I of Wallachia (in battle)
- December 31 – Johanna of Bavaria, Queen of Bohemia (b. c. 1362)
- date unknown
  - Al-Wathiq II, caliph of Cairo
  - Takatsukasa Fuyumichi, Japanese nobleman (b. 1330)
- probable – William Langland, English poet (b. 1332)

1387

- January – Elizabeth of Bosnia, regent of Hungary
- January 1 – King Charles II of Navarre (b. 1332)
- January 6 – Peter IV of Aragon (b. 1319)
- July 20 – Robert IV of Artois, Count of Eu (poisoned) (b. 1356)
- July 22 – Frans Ackerman, Flemish statesman (b. 1330)
- August 23 – King Olaf IV of Norway/Olaf II of Denmark (b. 1370)
- date unknown
  - Richard Óg Burke, second Clanricarde of Ireland
  - Sir David Hanmer, Welsh judge, father-in-law of Owain Glyndŵr

1388

- March 4 – Thomas Usk, English author
- August 14 – James Douglas, 2nd Earl of Douglas (killed in battle)
- July 15 – Agnes of Durazzo, titular Latin empress consort of Constantinople (d. 1313)
- August 15 – Adalbertus Ranconis de Ericinio, Bohemian theologian
- date unknown
  - Simon de Burley, Lord Warden of the Cinque Ports
  - Sultan Firuz Shah Tughlaq of Delhi
  - Uskhal Khan, Emperor Tianyuan of Northern Yuan

1389

- March 14 – Ghiyas-ud-Din Tughluq II, Sultan of Delhi (murdered)
- May 19 – Dmitry Donskoy, Grand Prince of Muscovy (b. 1350)
- June 15 (in the Battle of Kosovo)
  - Prince Lazar, Prince of Serbia (b. 1329)
  - Murad I, Ottoman Sultan (b. 1326)
  - Miloš Obilić, Serbian knight
- October 15 – Pope Urban VI (b. 1318)
- December 31 (assassination)
  - Chang of Goryeo, deposed Korean king (b. 1381)
  - U of Goryeo, Korean king (b. 1365)
- date unknown
  - Isabella, Countess of Fife, Scottish noblewoman (b. 1320)
  - Hayam Wuruk, ruler of the Majapahit Empire (b. 1334)
  - Ignatius Saba I, Syriac Orthodox Patriarch of Tur Abdin.
