= List of regicides =

This is a list of regicides, the killing of monarchs by others.

== Definitions ==
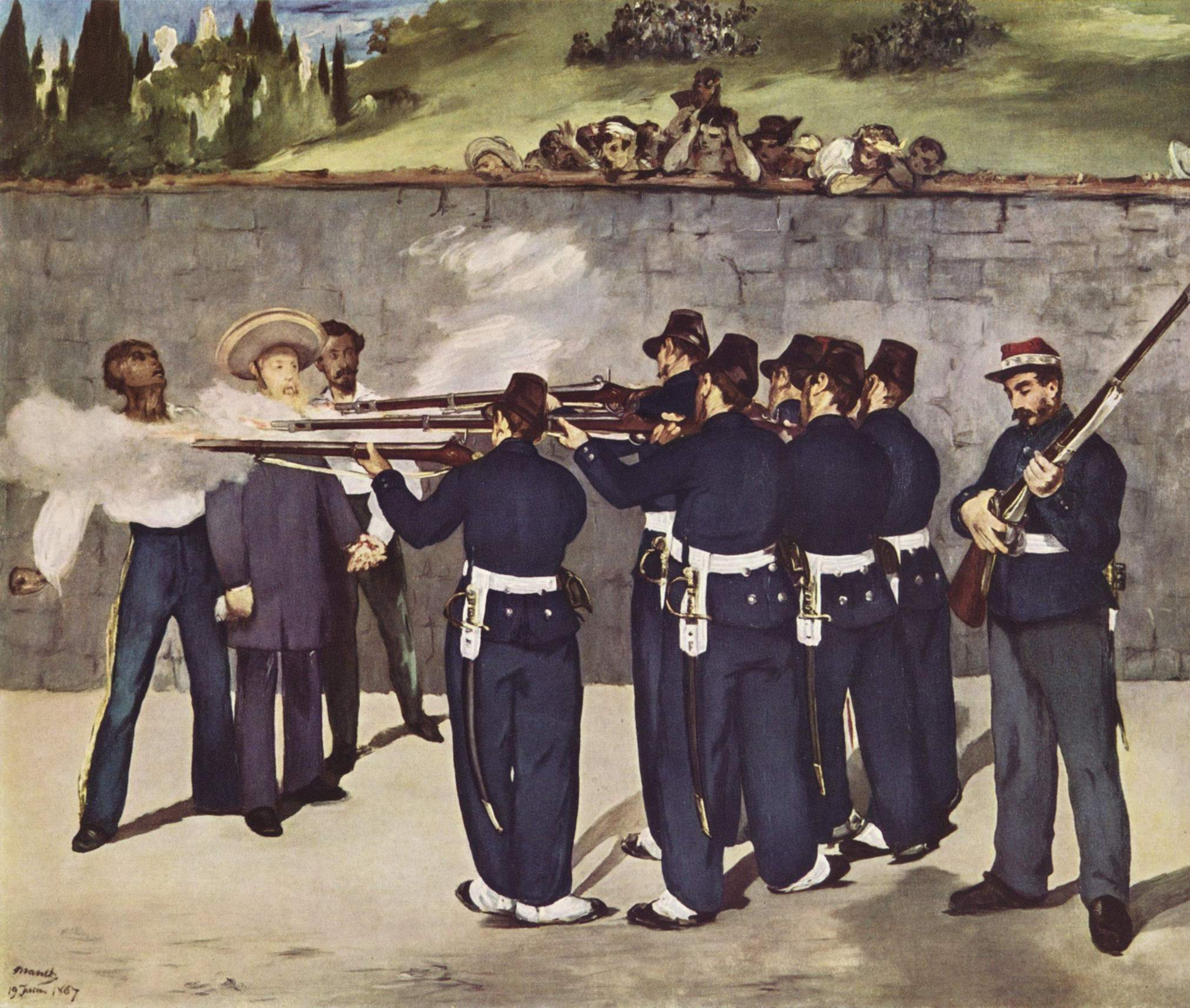
Execution of Emperor Maximilian I of Mexico, by Édouard Manet

The etymology of the term regicide is from the Latin noun rex ('king') and the Latin verb caedere ('to kill'); thus, a regicide is literally a 'king-killing'. Different cultures and authors in history have used different definitions for what constitutes the crime of regicide. Rex is usually but not always understood to refer to not just kings, but any type of monarch, which leads to semantic problems of scope. Some monarchs, such as Nicholas II and Haile Selassie, had already ceased to be de facto rulers at the time of their deaths due to forced or voluntary abdication, but especially after forced abdications (depositions), these monarchs (and their supporters) often still saw themselves as the de jure rulers; therefore, whether a current monarch or former monarch had been killed could be a point of view on their legitimacy. A well-known controversy in historiography is the 1793 Execution of Louis XVI: Legitimists might say it was a "regicide" of the legitimate "King Louis XVI" by "the rabble", but French Revolutionaries could have regarded it as the "lawful execution" of "citizen Louis Capet" after a "fair trial" that had found him guilty. Other killings, such as the assassination of Archduke Franz Ferdinand, are generally disqualified as "regicides", because this crown prince had not yet taken the throne. Suicide is generally discounted as well, as are the killings of monarchs' consorts or other relatives, such as that of Empress Elisabeth of Austria in 1898, or Earl Mountbatten in 1979. As such, it is difficult to make a universally accepted list of what constitutes a regicide. The following is a list of cases of monarchs in history who were deliberately killed by someone else in some fashion, according to reliable sources.

== 2000 – 1000 BC ==
- 1962 BC Amenemhat I, of the Middle Kingdom of Egypt by his own bodyguards
- 1526 BC Mursili I, King of the Hittites by his brother-in-law Hantili I
- Unknown date in late 2nd millennium BC, Eglon of Moab by Ehud
- 1155 BC Ramesses III of New Kingdom of Egypt from a neck wound inflicted by conspirators
- 11th century BC Agag of Amalek by the prophet Samuel
- 1005 BC Ish-bosheth of Israel, slain by his own captains

== 900 – 500 BC ==
- 900 BC Nadab of Israel, slain by his own captain Baasha
- 885 BC King Elah of Israel, murdered by his chariot commander Zimri
- 841 BC Jehoram of Israel, murdered by Jehu
- 836 BC Athaliah, Queen of Judah, by rebels that placed Jehoash on the throne
- 797 BC Jehoash of Judah by his own servants at Miloh
- 771 BC King You of Zhou by the Marquess of Shen
- 767 BC Amaziah of Judah assassinated at Lachish
- 752 BC Zechariah of Israel murdered by Shallum
- 740 or 737 BC Pekahiah, King of Israel, assassinated by Pekah, son of Remaliah
- 732 BC Pekah, King of Israel, by Hoshea
- 681 BC Sennacherib, King of Assyria, assassinated in obscure circumstances
- 641 BC Amon of Judah, assassinated by own servants
- 578 BC Lucius Tarquinius Priscus, King of Rome, by two shepherds
- 514 BC Hipparchus of Athens, assassinated by two lovers, Harmodius and Aristogeiton

== 5th century BC ==
- 465 BC Xerxes I of Persia by his chief bodyguard Artabanus
- 424 BC Xerxes II of Persia by his brother Sogdianus

== 4th century BC ==
- 336 BC Philip II of Macedon, assassinated by his own bodyguard.
- 330 BC Darius III of Persia, assassinated by his general Bessus
- 323 BC Alexander III of Macedon, Died of an unknown illness, though many speculate that he was poisoned
- 317 BC Philip III of Macedon, executed by his stepmother Olympias
- 315 BC, Porus the Elder, king of Pauravas, present day India, assassinated by one of Alexander's generals
- 309 BC Alexander IV of Macedon, assassinated at the age of 14 by the regent Cassander

== 3rd century BC ==
- 294 BC Alexander V of Macedon, assassinated by Demetrius Poliorcetes
- 281 BC Seleucus I Nicator, assassinated by Ptolemy Ceraunus
- 249 BC Demetrius of Cyrene, assassinated by his wife Berenice II
- 246 BC Antiochus II Theos, poisoned by his wife Laodice I
- 241 BC Agis IV of Sparta, executed by ephors without a regular trial
- 233 BC Deidamia II of Epirus, assassinated during a republican revolt
- 227 BC Archidamus V of Sparta, assassinated possibly by orders of his co-ruler Cleomenes III
- 223 BC Seleucus III Ceraunus, assassinated in Anatolia by members of his army
- 223 BC Diodotus II of Bactria, killed by the usurper Euthydemus I
- 214 BC Hieronymus of Syracuse, assassinated by conspirators
- 207 BC Qin Er Shi through forced suicide put on him by his eunuch Zhao Gao
- 206 BC Ziying executed by Xiang Yu

== 2nd century BC ==
- 185 BC Brihadratha Maurya of India, assassinated by Pushyamitra Shunga during a military parade
- 149 BC Prusias II of Bithynia, assassinated by supporters of his son
- 120 BC Mithridates V of Pontus, poisoned at a banquet
- 116/111 BC Ariarathes VI of Cappadocia murdered by Gordius for Mithridates VI of Pontus
- 104 BC Jugurtha, King of Numidia, captured by Roman army, paraded in Rome and starved to death in prison

== 1st century BC ==
- 100 BC Ariarathes VII of Cappadocia murdered by Mithridates VI of Pontus
- 80 BC Ptolemy XI Alexander II, lynched by the citizens of Alexandria
- 51 BC Ariobarzanes II of Cappadocia, assassinated by Parthian favorites
- 44 BC Burebista, Great King (Emperor) of Dacia was assassinated by the indigenous nobles and his advisors.
- 44 BC Ptolemy XIV of Egypt, widely suspected to have been poisoned by Cleopatra VII
- 42 BC Ariobarzanes III of Cappadocia, executed by Gaius Cassius Longinus
- 36 BC Ariarathes X of Cappadocia, executed by Mark Antony
- 30 BC Caesarion of Egypt, executed by Octavian
- 29 BC Antiochus II of Commagene, executed by Octavian

== 1st century ==
- 25 AD the Gengshi Emperor by strangulation from Xie Lu
- 41 Caligula, the Emperor of Rome by a praetorian guard and a group of conspirators supported by the Roman senate
- 69 Galba of Rome by the praetorian guard
- 69 Vitellius of Rome by troops of an indigenous commander of eastern provinces
- 96 Domitian of Rome by a group of court officials

== 2nd century ==
- 146 Emperor Zhi of Han, poisoned by Liang Ji
- 190 Emperor Shao of Han forced to drink poison by rebels
- 192 Commodus of Rome strangled by his wrestling partner supported by a group of conspirators
- 193 Pertinax of Rome murdered by Praetorian guard
- 193 Didius Julianus of Rome executed on orders by the senate

== 3rd century ==
- 217 Caracalla murdered by a soldier
- 218 Macrinus, executed by Elagabalus
- 222 Elagabalus murdered by Praetorian guard
- 235 Severus Alexander murdered by the army
- 238 Maximinus I murdered by Praetorian guard
- 238 Pupienus murdered by Praetorian guard
- 238 Balbinus murdered by Praetorian guard
- 253 Trebonianus Gallus by his own troops
- 253 Aemilian by his own troops
- 260 Cao Mao by Cheng Ji under the order of Sima Zhao
- 268 Gallienus murdered by his own commanders
- 275 Aurelian assassinated by Praetorian guard
- 276 Florianus assassinated by his own troops
- 282 Marcus Aurelius Probus assassinated by his own troops

== 4th century ==
- 307 Severus II forced to commit suicide by Maxentius
- 310 Maximian forced to commit suicide by Constantine I
- 325 Licinius executed on orders by Constantine I
- 350 Constans killed by supporters of Magnentius
- 383 Gratian murdered by army faction
- 385 Emperor Xuanzhao of Former Qin, strangled to death by Yao Chang

== 5th century ==
- 419 Emperor An of Jin, assassinated by Wang Shaozhi under the order of Liu Yu
- 421 Emperor Gong of Jin, assassinated by soldiers under the order of Liu Yu
- 422 Theodomer, king of the Franks, executed along with his mother by the Romans
- 423 Joannes captured and executed by eastern Roman army
- 451 Theodoric I, king of the Visigoths, killed in the Battle of the Catalaunian Plains
- 453 Emperor Wen of Liu Song by Crown Prince Liu Shao
- 455 Valentinian III assassinated
- 456 Emperor Ankō of Japan, by Prince Mayowa

== 6th century ==
- 507 Alaric II, King of the Visigoths, at the Battle of Vouillé
- after 507 Chararic, Frankish king, killed by Clovis I after the former had abdicated and become a monk
- 509 Sigobert the Lame, Frankish king, reportedly murdered by his son Chlodoric under the instigation of Clovis I
- 509 Chlodoric, Frankish king, assassinated by followers of Clovis I
- 509 Ragnachar, Frankish king, executed by Clovis I
- 524 Sigismund of Burgundy, King of the Burgundians, by Chlodomer, King of Orleans
- 524 Chlodomer, Frankish king, killed at the Battle of Vézeronce
- 534 Godomar, King of Burgundy, killed by the Franks
- 551 Emperor Jianwen of Liang, by Hou Jing
- 555 Gubazes II of Lazica, King of Lazica, by two Byzantine generals
- 565 Diarmait mac Cerbaill, King of Tara, by Áed Dub mac Suibni
- 572 Alboin, King of the Lombards, poisoned by his wife
- 575 Sigebert I, King of Austrasia, assassinated by slaves sent by his sister-in-law
- 584 Chilperic I, King of Neustria, assassinated by an unknown assailant during a hunting expedition
- 585 Gundoald, Merovingian usurper king, killed by a stone thrown by a follower of King Guntram
- 592 Emperor Sushun of Japan, by Soga no Umako
- 596 Childebert II, King of Austrasia, poisoned

== 7th century ==
- 602 Maurice, Byzantine Emperor, beheaded
- 610 Phocas, Byzantine Emperor, executed
- 618 Emperor Yang of Sui, strangled by soldier in coup
- 656 Uthman ibn Affan, Caliph of Islamic Caliphate, assassinated by rebels
- 661 Ali ibn Abi Talib, Caliph of Islamic Caliphate, assassinated by Ibn Muljam
- 668 Constans II, Byzantine Emperor, assassinated

== 8th century ==
- 710 Emperor Zhongzong of Tang poisoned by his wife Empress Wei

== 9th century ==
- 802 Beorhtric, King of Wessex, accidentally poisoned by his wife Eadburh, daughter of Offa, King of Mercia, this account was written by Asser, a courtier of Alfred the Great, grandson of Beorhtric's rival, Ecgberht, King of Wessex, who might've been involved
- c. 865 Ragnar Lodbrok, legendary King of Sweden & Denmark was killed after being thrown into a pit of snakes by Ælla II of Northumbria
- 867 Ælle II of Northumbria, was killed by way of blood eagle by Ragnar Lodbrok's sons, Björn, Ubba, Hvitserk, Sigurd, and Ivar
- 882 Pope John VIII of the Papal States, assassinated by other clerics via poisoning and clubbing
- 897 Pope Stephen VI of the Papal States, imprisoned and strangled

== 10th century ==
- 904 Pope Leo V of the Papal States, either murdered by Antipope Christopher or executed on the orders of either Pope Sergius III or Theophylact I of Tusculum
- 904 Emperor Zhaozong of Tang by soldiers sent by Zhu Quanzhong
- 908 Emperor Ai of Tang poisoned on orders by Zhu Quanzhong
- 912 Emperor Taizu of Later Liang, stabbed by Zhu Yougui
- 928, Pope John X of the Papal States, killed by Guy of Tuscany either by smothering him with a pillow or by poor prison conditions
- 935 Wenceslaus I, Duke of Bohemia killed by his younger brother Boleslaus the Cruel
- 964 Pope John XII of the Papal States, allegedly murdered by a man whose wife he had committed adultery with.
- 974 Pope Benedict VI of the Papal States, assassinated via strangulation by a priest on the orders of Antipope Boniface VII
- 978 Edward the martyr killed in unclear circumstances
- 984 Pope John XIV of the Papal States, killed by unknown means after being taken captive by Antipope Boniface VII

== 11th century ==
- 1014 Brian Boru killed in unclear circumstances
- 1015 Gavril Radomir, Tsar of Bulgaria, assassinated by his cousin Ivan Vladislav who usurped the throne
- 1040 Duncan I of Scotland, killed at the Battle of Pitgaveny by forces led by Macbeth
- 1046 Pope Clement II of the Papal States, rumored to have been poisoned, which was later corroborated by toxicology tests on his remains.
- 1057 Macbeth, King of Scotland, killed at the Battle of Lumphanan
- 1066 Harold Godwinson, King of England, killed at the Battle of Hastings
- 1072 Sancho II of Castile and León assassinated by Vellido Dolfos
- 1084 Saw Lu of Pagan killed by Yanmankan

== 12th century ==
- 1100 William II of England was shot with an arrow on August 2nd in New Forest possibly by Walter Tirel
- 1156 Sverker I of Sweden assassinated by his servant possibly on the orders of Magnus Henriksson
- 1157 Eystein II of Norway was killed by his captors after being defeated in battle by Inge I Haraldsson
- 1160 Eric IX of Sweden assassinated by an armed group led by Magnus II of Sweden and possibly the Sverkers
- 1161 Magnus II of Sweden killed in battle
- 1161 Inge I of Norway killed after being defeated in battle by Haakon II of Norway
- 1162 Haakon II of Norway killed in the battle of Sekken
- 1167 Charles VII of Sweden assassinated by the rival Eric dynasty led by Knut Eriksson
- 1167 Alaungsithu and Min Shin Saw of Pagan killed by Narathu
- 1171 Narathu of Pagan assassinated by assassins from Paṭṭikera.
- 1174 Andrey Bogolyubsky, Prince of Rus, was murdered by members of Kuchkovich family
- 1174 Naratheinkha of Pagan killed by Aungzwamagyi
- 1184 Magnus V of Norway killed in the Battle of Fimreite
- 1185 Andronikos I Komnenos tortured and killed by the people of Constantinople
- 1192 Conrad of Montferrat, King of Jerusalem, assassins unknown to history
- 1199 Richard I of England shot with crossbow by Pierre Basile

== 13th century ==
- 1206 Muhammad of Ghor, Sultan of the Ghurid Empire, assassinated while doing evening prayers
- 1208 Philip of Swabia, king of Germany, assassinated by Otto VIII, Count Palatine of Bavaria
- 1210 Sverker II of Sweden was killed in battle by Folke Jarl
- 1213 Peter II of Aragon is killed by a northern crusader knight and lieutenant of Simon de Montfort, 5th Earl of Leicester; Alan de Renty during the Battle of Muret
- 1227 Ken Arok, King of Singhasari, by his stepson Anusapati
- 1240 Skule Bårdsson who was a pretender to the throne of Norway was killed in battle against Haakon IV of Norway
- 1250 Eric IV of Denmark killed by Abel, King of Denmark's chamberlain Lave Gudmundsen
- 1252 Abel, King of Denmark killed by Henner the Wheelright at Husum Bridge en route to fight Frisian Peasants
- 1259 Christopher I of Denmark poisoned by abbot Arnfast of Ryd Abbey in revenge for mistreatment of Archbishop Jacob Erlandsen
- 1286 Eric V of Denmark assassinated by a group of conspirators led by his Marshal Stig Andersen Hvide and his vassal Jacob Nielsen, Count of Halland
- 1287 Narathihapate of Pagan killed by Thihathu of Prome
- 1290 Ladislaus IV of Hungary assassinated by three Cumans Árbóc, Törtel, and Kemence, at the castle of Körösszeg
- 1296 Przemysł II, King of Poland, by the Margraves of Brandenburg, some Polish families, or maybe both

== 14th century ==
- 1306 Wenceslaus III of Bohemia, King of Bohemia, Hungary and Poland
- 1308 Albert I of Germany, King of Germany, murdered by his nephew John Parricida
- 1323 Emperor Gong of Song, forced to commit suicide by Emperor Yingzong of Yuan
- 1323 Emperor Yingzong of Yuan by a plot formed among Yesün Temür's supporters
- 1327 Edward II of England after forced abdication on behalf of son Edward III of England
- 1328 Jayanegara, King of Majapahit, by Ra Tanca, his doctor
- 1359 Berdi Beg of the Golden Horde by his brother Qulpa
- 1382 Joanna I of Naples was murdered by her cousin Charles II of Hungary
- 1386 Charles II of Hungary by Blaise Forgách
- 1388 Thong Lan, King of Ayutthaya, deposed and executed by the order of Ramesuan
- 1389 Murad I, Ottoman Sultan, assassinated by Serbian knight Miloš Obilić
- 1389 Mansa Maghan II of Mali, usurped and killed by Mansa Sandaki
- 1389 Lazar of Serbia, killed at the Battle of Kosovo
- 1390 Mansa Sandaki of Mali, usurped and killed by Mansa Maghan III/Mahmud I, brother of Maghan II
- 1395 Ivan Shishman, Tsar of Bulgaria, murdered on the order of the Ottoman Sultan Bayezid I

== 15th century ==
- 1402 the Jianwen Emperor was claimed to have been burned to death in his palace by Zhu Di
- 1437 James I of Scotland assassinated by orders of his uncle Walter Stewart, his first cousin once removed Robert Stewart, and Sir Robert Graham
- 1449 Ulugh Beg, Sultan of the Timurid Empire, murdered by his son, Abdal-Latif Mirza
- 1453 Dmitry Shemyaka of Russia, was poisoned by the bandit Paganca on the orders of his cousin Vasily II of Moscow, which ended the Muscovite War of Succession
- 1471 Henry VI of England, deposed and supposedly murdered shortly after
- 1483 Edward V of England by either Richard III or some other party
- 1485 Richard III of England, killed at the Battle of Bosworth Field
- 1488 Alauddin Riayat Shah of Malacca was poisoned by his officer.

== 16th century ==
- 1513 Ahmad Shah of Malacca was murdered by his father who later succeeded him.
- 1513 James IV of Scotland, killed at the Battle of Flodden
- 1516 Lê Tương Dực was assassinated in a rebellion led by Trịnh Duy Sản
- 1520 Moctezuma II, Emperor of the Aztecs, by either the Spanish forces led by Hernán Cortés or his own people
- 1532 Huáscar, Emperor of the Incas, executed by his brother Atahualpa
- 1533 Atahualpa, Emperor of the Incas, executed by the Spanish
- 1534 Ratsadathirat, King of Ayutthaya, deposed and executed by the order of Chairachathirat
- 1543 Chai, King of Lan Na, and his royal family were murdered by the nobility
- 1545 Ket of Lan Na was assassinated by the Shan nobility
- 1546 Chairachathirat, King of Ayutthaya, was poisoned by Sisudachan, his consort
- 1548 Yotfa, King of Ayutthaya, deposed and executed by the order of Worawongsathirat
- 1548 Worawongsathirat, King of Ayutthaya, assassinated in a coup led by Khun Phirenthorathep
- 1550 Tabinshwehti, King of Burma, was assassinated by Smim Sawhtut, the Mon governor of Sittaung
- 1557 Mohammed al-Shaykh, Sultan of Morocco, by Ottoman forces
- 1561 Afonso II of Kongo, King of Kongo, Assassinated by his Half-Brother Bernardo I of Kongo
- 1571 Setthathirath, King of Lan Xang, got murdered by a group of the nobility
- 1587 Mary, Queen of Scots, executed after a trial by an English court of 36 noblemen over the Babington Plot
- 1589 Henry III of France by Jacques Clément

== 17th century ==
- 1605 Feodor II of Russia, by order of False Dmitry I
- 1606 False Dmitry I, an impostor who ascended Russian throne, was overthrown and killed by a local mob in Moscow, who shot his remains out of a cannon
- 1610 Henry IV of France by François Ravaillac
- 1610 Sanphet IV, King of Ayutthaya, deposed and executed in a coup led by Intharacha III
- 1622 Osman II of the Ottoman Empire by the Grand Vizier Davud Pasha in orders of Halime Sultan, the mother of Mustafa I
- 1629 Borommaracha II, King of Ayutthaya, deposed and executed by the nobility
- 1635 Athittayawong, King of Ayutthaya, deposed and executed by the order of Prasat Thong
- 1636 Al Walid ben Zidan, Sultan of Morocco, by French troops
- 1648 Ibrahim of the Ottoman Empire executed by orders from his mother Kösem Sultan
- 1649 Charles I of England executed following a trial set up by the Rump Parliament
- 1656 Sanpet VI, King of Ayutthaya, deposed and executed in a coup led by Si Suthammaracha, his uncle, and Narai, his half-brother
- 1656 Si Suthammaracha deposed and executed in a coup led by Narai, his nephew
- 1659 Ahmad al-Abbas, Sultan of Morocco, by his uncle, Abdul Karim Abu Bakr Al-Shabani
- 1664 Muhammad ibn Sharif, Sultan of Morocco, killed in battle by troops loyal to his half-brother Moulay Rashid, who succeeded him
- 1699 Mahmud II, Sultan of Johor, murdered by Megat Seri Rama, his admiral in carriage.

== 18th century ==
- 1718 Charles XII of Sweden killed in the Siege of Fredriksten.
- 1727 Soltan Hoseyn of the Safavid dynasty, Shahanshah of Persia (Iran), executed on the orders of Ashraf Hotak
- 1747 Nader Shah of the Afshar dynasty, Shahanshah of Persia by Salah Bey
- 1748 Adel Shah of the Afshar dynasty, Shahanshah of Persia, executed on the orders of Shahrukh Afshar
- 1762 Peter III of Russia deposed and supposedly murdered by orders from his wife Catherine the Great shortly thereafter
- 1764 Ivan VI of Russia, a lifelong prisoner who was briefly proclaimed emperor but never reigned, killed by order of Catherine the Great after the Vasily Mirovich uprising
- 1773 Šćepan Mali of Montenegro, on the orders of Ottoman governor Kara Mahmud Pasha
- 1782 Taksin, King of Thonburi, deposed and executed in a coup
- 1792 Gustav III of Sweden by Jacob Johan Anckarström
- 1793 Louis XVI of France executed following a trial by the National Convention
- 1794 Lotf Ali Khan, last Zand king of Persia (Iran), deposed and murdered by his successor, Agha Mohammad Khan Qajar
- 1797 Agha Mohammad Khan Qajar, Shahanshah of Persia, by Sadegh Gorji, Khodadad Esfahani and Abbas Mazandarani

== 19th century ==
- 1801 Emperor Paul I of Russia by Count Pahlen and his accomplices
- 1815 Joachim Murat, executed in Calabria by orders of Ferdinand I of the Two Sicilies
- 1828 Shaka King of the Zulus by his half-brother and successor Dingane and accomplices
- 1855 Hamengkubuwono V of Yogyakarta by his fifth wife, Kanjeng Mas Hemawati
- 1861 Radama II of Madagascar by a group of army officers
- 1867 Maximilian I of Mexico executed after a Mexican court-martial
- 1868 Mihailo Obrenović, Prince of Serbia by Pavle and Kosta Radovanović
- 1881 Alexander II of Russia by Ignacy Hryniewiecki, a member of Narodnaya Volya (People's Will)
- 1896 Nasser al-Din Shah, Qajar king of Persia (Iran), assassinated by Mirza Reza Kermani, a follower of the Afghan ideologue Jamal al-Din al-Afghani
- 1898 Empress Elisabeth of Austria, Empress of Austria and Queen of Hungary, stabbed in the heart by the anarchist Luigi Lucheni
- 1900 Umberto I of Italy by anarchist Gaetano Bresci

== 20th century ==
- 1903 Alexander I of Serbia and his wife Queen Draga by a group of army officers
- 1908 Carlos I of Portugal, assassinated with his son Infante Luís Filipe, Prince Royal of Portugal by Alfredo Luís da Costa and Manuel Buiça, both connected to the Carbonária (the Portuguese section of the Carbonari)
- 1908 The Guangxu Emperor by arsenic poisoning, perhaps on orders from Empress Dowager Cixi or Yuan Shikai.
- 1913 George I of Greece by Alexandros Schinas
- 1918 Nicholas II of Russia and the imperial family – including Tsarevich Alexei Romanov, both of whom already abdicated the throne - executed by a Bolshevik firing squad under the command of Yakov Yurovsky
- 1933 Mohammed Nadir Shah, king of Afghanistan, assassinated by student Abdul Khaliq Hazara
- 1934 Alexander I of Yugoslavia by Vlado Chernozemski, a member of the Internal Macedonian Revolutionary Organization
- 1936 George V of the United Kingdom, involuntarily euthanised by Lord Dawson of Penn
- 1938 Queen Genepil was shot during Stalinist repressions in Mongolia.
- 1946 Ananda Mahidol of Thailand. The King's death is still a mystery and may have been either regicide or suicide.
- 1948 Yahya Muhammad Hamid ed-Din, king of North Yemen, assassinated in the Alwaziri coup
- 1951 Abdullah I of Jordan by Mustafa Ashi
- 1958 Faisal II of Iraq executed by firing squad under the command of Captain Abdus Sattar As Sab, a member of the coup d'état led by Colonel Abdul Karim Qassim
- 1975 Faisal of Saudi Arabia by his nephew Faisal bin Musa'id (Assassin publicly beheaded)
- 1975 Haile Selassie of Ethiopia, widely suspected to have been murdered in his sleep by asphyxiation on the orders of the Derg junta, which had deposed him a year earlier.

== 21st century ==
- 2001 Birendra of Nepal, killed by his son Crown Prince Dipendra, in the Nepalese royal massacre.

== See also ==
- List of assassinations
- List of heads of state and government who were sentenced to death
- List of heads of state and government who were assassinated or executed
