= 1387 =

1387 in various calendars
- Gregorian calendar: 1387; MCCCLXXXVII
- Ab urbe condita: 2140
- Armenian calendar: 836; ԹՎ ՊԼԶ
- Assyrian calendar: 6137
- Balinese saka calendar: 1308–1309
- Bengali calendar: 793–794
- Berber calendar: 2337
- English Regnal year: 10 Ric. 2 – 11 Ric. 2
- Buddhist calendar: 1931
- Burmese calendar: 749
- Byzantine calendar: 6895–6896
- Chinese calendar: 丙寅年 (Fire Tiger); 4084 or 3877 — to — 丁卯年 (Fire Rabbit); 4085 or 3878
- Coptic calendar: 1103–1104
- Discordian calendar: 2553
- Ethiopian calendar: 1379–1380
- Hebrew calendar: 5147–5148
- Hindu calendars
- Vikram Samvat: 1443–1444
- Shaka Samvat: 1308–1309
- Kali Yuga: 4487–4488
- Holocene calendar: 11387
- Igbo calendar: 387–388
- Iranian calendar: 765–766
- Islamic calendar: 788–789
- Japanese calendar: Shitoku 4 / Kakei 1 (嘉慶元年)
- Javanese calendar: 1300–1301
- Julian calendar: 1387; MCCCLXXXVII
- Korean calendar: 3720
- Minguo calendar: 525 before ROC 民前525年
- Nanakshahi calendar: −81
- Thai solar calendar: 1929–1930
- Tibetan calendar: མེ་ཕོ་སྟག་ལོ་ (male Fire-Tiger); 1513 or 1132 or 360 — to — མེ་མོ་ཡོས་ལོ་ (female Fire-Hare); 1514 or 1133 or 361

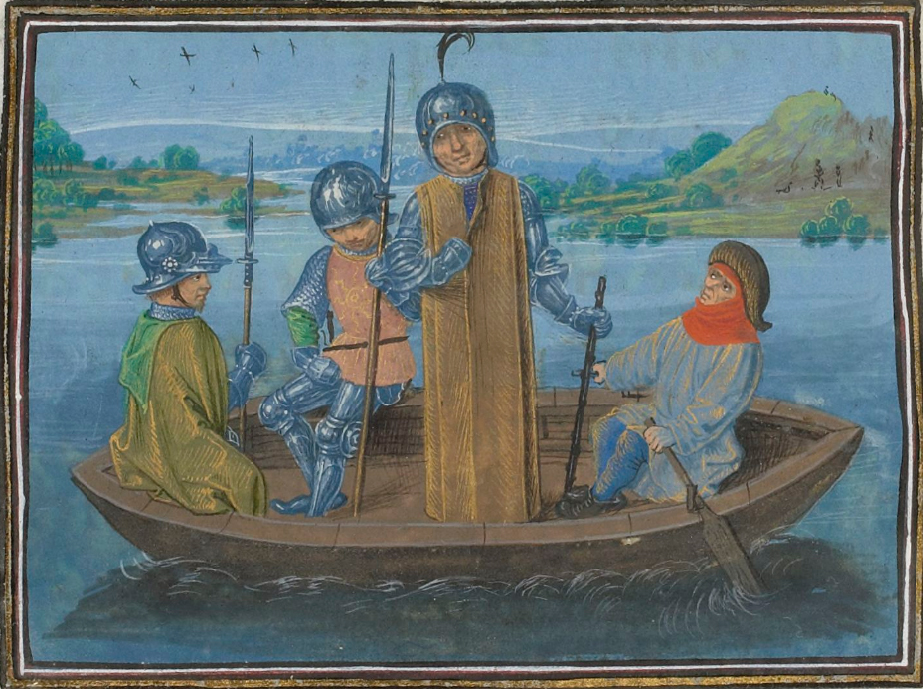
December 19: Former royal advisor Robert de Vere flees after English royalists lose the battle of Radcot Bridge.

Year 1387 (MCCCLXXXVII) was a common year starting on Tuesday of the Julian calendar.

== Events ==
=== January–March ===
- January 1 – Charles III ascends to the throne of Navarre, after the death of his father, Charles II.
- January 5 – John I succeeds his father, Peter IV, as King of Aragon, Valencia and Count of Barcelona and forms an alliance with France and Castile.
- January 16 – Elizabeta Kotromanic, the regent of Hungary for her daughter, Queen Mary, is murdered in prison by Croatian rebels.
- March 11 – Battle of Castagnaro: Padua, led by John Hawkwood, is victorious over Giovanni Ordelaffi of Verona.
- March 25– The Battle of Margate, a naval battle off the coast of England at Margate, ends with the England navy, commanded by the Earl of Arundel, victorious over a combined fleet of ships from the Kingdom of France, the Crown of Castile and the County of Flanders.

=== April–June ===
- April 12– Admiral Arundel of the English Navy brings 68 captured ships from Margate battle to the port of Orwell.
- May 1– With a larger squadron of almost 60 ships, Arundel departs from Orwell and sails to the British-controlled French port of Brest, at the time under siege by Jean de Montfort.
- May 17– At Caffa, one of the Balkan colonies of the Republic of Genoa, the Genoese Army thwarts an attack at Solkhat (Sorcati) by the Tatars.
- May 28– Anticipating a war with Burma, China's Emperor orders the troops at his forts on the Burmese border to increase the height of their walls and to begin making gunpowder to increase their supply.
- June 2 – John Holland, a maternal half-brother of Richard II of England, is created Earl of Huntingdon.
- June 4 – Queen Mary of Hungary is rescued from imprisonment after being held captive by Croatian rebels.

=== July–September ===
- July 7 – A Mongol Army unit, led by Naghachu, ambushes and massacres a Chinese Army division led by Chen Yong (陳鏞), Marquis of Linjiang, who is killed in the attack.
- July 14 – The Chinese Army commander, General Feng Sheng, leads troops across the Liao River defeats Naghachu's Mongol troops and takes Naghachu as a prisoner of war.
- August 22 – Olaf, King of Norway and Denmark and claimant to the throne of Sweden, dies. The vacant thrones come under the regency of his mother Margaret I of Denmark, who will soon become queen in her own right.
- September 8 – General Feng Sheng is removed from command of the Chinese Army by Emperor Zhu Yuanzhang and replaced by General Lan Yu.
- September 27 – Petru of Moldavia pays homage to Władysław II Jagiełło, making Moldavia a Polish fief (which it will remain until 1497).

=== October–December ===
- October 19 – The Scaliger rule over the independent Lordship of Verona comes to an end after 125 years when the dictator Antonio I della Scala is forced by the nobles of the Lordship of Milan, led by Gian Galeazzo Visconti, to flee the city.
- November 17 – The three rebel Lords Appellant— Thomas of Woodstock, 1st Duke of Gloucester, Richard FitzAlan, 11th Earl of Arundel and Thomas de Beauchamp, 12th Earl of Warwick arrive at King Richard's palace at Westminster after traveling with 300 men on horseback to confront the King, and effectively take control of the government of England. The Lords demand that advisers Neville, Pole, De Vere, Tresilian and Brembre be held in custody until a trial can take place, and the King agrees after they threaten to take the government by force.
- November 19 – By order of the Lords Appellant, Sir Robert Tresilian, Chief Justice of the King's Bench of England, is arrested along with other nobles loyal to King Richard II, and charged with treason for malfeasance in office, with trial to take place four months later at Parliament in February.
- November – The Emperor Zhu Yuanzhang of China directs General Lan Yu to attack the Mongol forces led by Tögüs Temür, whom the Emperor Zhu had deposed. The confrontation between Lan Yu and Tögüs Temür will culminate six months later at the Battle of Buir Lake, 500 miles (800 km) north of Beijing.
- December 19 – At the Battle of Radcot Bridge in England, forces loyal to King Richard II are defeated by the Lords Appellant, a group of three rebellious barons—. King Richard is taken prisoner, and not freed until he agrees to dismiss all the councillors in his court. Richard continues as the nominal King of England, with the Lords Appellant administering the kingdom.

=== Date unknown ===
- Timur conquers the Muzaffarid Empire in central Persia, and appoints three puppet rulers.
- Khan Tokhtamysh of the Golden Horde invades the Timurid Empire, but has to withdraw soon after, due to heavy snow.
- Maghan II succeeds his brother, Musa II, as Mansa of the Mali Empire

== Births ==
- July 6 – Queen Blanche I of Navarre (d. 1441)
- date unknown – Henriette, Countess of Montbéliard, regent of Württemberg (d. 1444)

== Deaths ==
- January – Elizabeth of Bosnia, regent of Hungary
- January 1 – King Charles II of Navarre (b. 1332)
- January 6 – Peter IV of Aragon (b. 1319)
- July 20 – Robert IV of Artois, Count of Eu (poisoned) (b. 1356)
- July 22 – Frans Ackerman, Flemish statesman (b. 1330)
- August 23 – King Olaf IV of Norway/Olaf II of Denmark (b. 1370)
- date unknown
  - Richard Óg Burke, second Clanricarde of Ireland
  - Sir David Hanmer, Welsh judge, father-in-law of Owain Glyndŵr
