= 1390 =

1390 in various calendars
- Gregorian calendar: 1390; MCCCXC
- Ab urbe condita: 2143
- Armenian calendar: 839; ԹՎ ՊԼԹ
- Assyrian calendar: 6140
- Balinese saka calendar: 1311–1312
- Bengali calendar: 796–797
- Berber calendar: 2340
- English Regnal year: 13 Ric. 2 – 14 Ric. 2
- Buddhist calendar: 1934
- Burmese calendar: 752
- Byzantine calendar: 6898–6899
- Chinese calendar: 己巳年 (Earth Snake); 4087 or 3880 — to — 庚午年 (Metal Horse); 4088 or 3881
- Coptic calendar: 1106–1107
- Discordian calendar: 2556
- Ethiopian calendar: 1382–1383
- Hebrew calendar: 5150–5151
- Hindu calendars
- Vikram Samvat: 1446–1447
- Shaka Samvat: 1311–1312
- Kali Yuga: 4490–4491
- Holocene calendar: 11390
- Igbo calendar: 390–391
- Iranian calendar: 768–769
- Islamic calendar: 792–793
- Japanese calendar: Kōō 2 / Meitoku 1 (明徳元年)
- Javanese calendar: 1303–1304
- Julian calendar: 1390; MCCCXC
- Korean calendar: 3723
- Minguo calendar: 522 before ROC 民前522年
- Nanakshahi calendar: −78
- Thai solar calendar: 1932–1933
- Tibetan calendar: ས་མོ་སྦྲུལ་ལོ་ (female Earth-Snake); 1516 or 1135 or 363 — to — ལྕགས་ཕོ་རྟ་ལོ་ (male Iron-Horse); 1517 or 1136 or 364

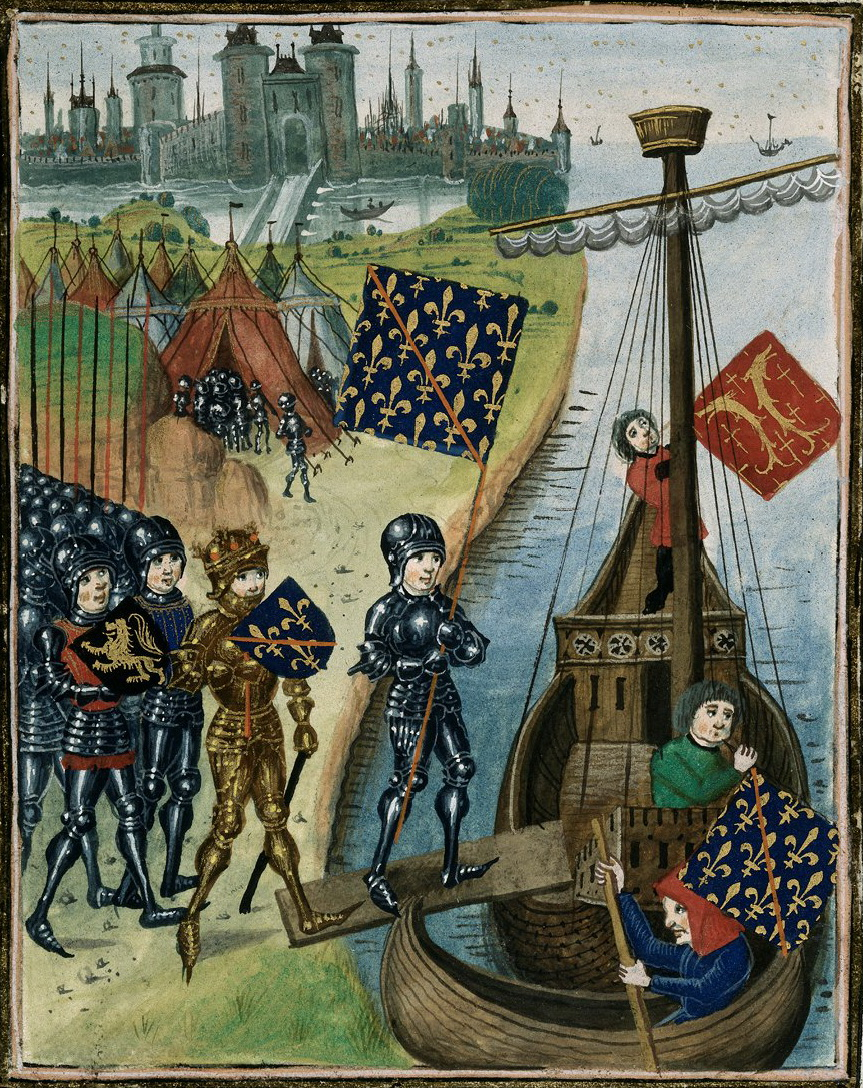
October 1; The knights of France and Genoa leave North Africa after the failure of the siege of Mahdia.

Year 1390 (MCCCXC) was a common year starting on Saturday (link will display full calendar) of the Julian calendar.

== Events ==
=== January–March ===
- January 19 – The Treaty of Lyck confirms an alliance between Vytautas and the Teutonic Knights, in the Lithuanian Civil War against Vytautas's cousin, Jogaila.
- January 23 – Ko Cheng succeeds Che Bong Nga, as King of Champa (modern-day eastern Vietnam).
- February 16 – At Heidelberg (in modern Germany) Ruprecht II of the House of Wittelsbach becomes the new Elector of the Palatinate in the Holy Roman Empire upon the death of his uncle, Rupert I.
- March 20 – Manuel III succeeds his father, Alexios III, as Emperor of Trebizond (modern north eastern Turkey).

=== April–June ===
- April 14 – John VII Palaiologos overthrows his grandfather, John V Palaiologos, as Byzantine Emperor.
- April 19 – Robert III succeeds his father, Robert II, as King of Scotland.
- May 26 – Lithuanian Civil War: The Treaty of Königsberg is signed in Königsberg, between Samogitian nobles and representatives of the Teutonic Knights.
- June 7 – Construction begins on San Petronio Basilica in Bologna.

=== July–September ===
- July 1 – The Barbary Crusade begins as the Kingdom of France and the Republic of Genoa attempt to stop raids by Barbary pirates by invading the North African region of Ifriqiya and laying siege to Mahdia in modern-day Tunisia. Louis II, Duke of Bourbon and Giacomo Fregoso of Genoa bring 6,000 knights and soldiers on 60 ships against 40,000 Muslim defenders led by the Caliph Abu al-Abbas Ahmad II of the Hafsid Sultanate and the Sultan Abu Tashufin II of Tlemcen.
- August 6 – Louis II of Anjou arrives in Naples to rule the Kingdom of Naples (as Luigi II d'Angio) after being appointed by Antipope John XXIII in France, but King Ladislaus continues to be recognized by supporters of Pope Boniface IX.
- August 31 – Nasir ud din Muhammad Shah III overthrows his brother, Abu Bakr Shah, as Sultan of Delhi.
- September 11 – Lithuanian Civil War: The coalition of Vytautas and the Teutonic Knights begins a 5-week siege of Vilnius. The Duke of Hereford (the future King Henry IV of England) is among the western European knights serving with the coalition.
- September 17 – John VII Palaiologos seeks refuge with the Ottoman sultan Bayezid I, after John V Palaiologos is restored by his son, Manuel, and the Republic of Venice.

=== October–December ===
- October 1 – The Christian crusaders of France and Genoa lift the siege of Mahdiya after Genoa negotiates a ceasefire and a 10-year armistice. The crusaders return to Genoa after having sustained 274 deaths from combat and from disease.
- October 9 – King Juan, ruler of the Crown of Castile and the Kingdom of León, is fatally injured when he is thrown from his horse while he is participating in an exhibition of horsemanship before a crowd at Alcalá de Henares. The Archbishop of Toledo, Pedro Tenorio, conceals the news of King Juan's death from the public until a regency council can be created for the King's 11-year-old son, Prince Enrique of Trastámara, who is proclaimed as King Enrique III.
- November 2 – The Treaty of Pyzdry is signed between King Władysław II Jagiełło of Poland and Wartislaw VII, Duke of Pomerania with the Duke pledging his support to the King in the Polish-Teutonic War.
- November 12 – The Parliament of England, having been summoned on September 12 by King Richard II of England opens at Westminster, and the House of Commons elects Sir James Pickering as its Speaker.
- December 1 –
  - Angelo Corraro is named as the Latin Patriarch of Constantinople, the Roman Catholic envoy to Byzantium and the Eastern Orthodox Church, by Pope Boniface IX. Corraro is chosen in 1406 as Pope Gregory XII.
  - A treaty is signed between the Kingdom of Scotland and the Kingdom of France at Edinburgh and witnessed by Walter Forrester.
- December 3 – King Richard II of England gives royal assent to numerous laws passed as the English Parliament adjourns after a three-week session, having passed numerous laws, including the Pardon of Offences Act (requiring the specification of the offense for which the person is being pardoned by the King) and the Enforcement of the Statute of Provisors Act providing forfeiture of the office for certain violations.

=== Date unknown ===
- Fall of Philadelphia – The Ottomans take Philadelphia, the last Byzantine enclave of any significance in Anatolia.
- Barquq is restored as Mamluk Sultan of Egypt, after overthrowing Sultan Hadji II.
- Sikandar But-shikan succeeds Sikandar Shah, as Sultan of Kashmir.
- Mahmud succeeds Sandaki as Mansa of the Mali Empire, restoring the Keita dynasty.
- N'Diklam Sare succeeds Sare N'Dyaye, as ruler of the Jolof Empire (part of modern Senegal).
- The Kingdom of Kaffa is established in modern-day Ethiopia (approximate date).
- Templo Mayor, the main temple of the Aztec capital of Tenochtitlan (modern Mexico City), is built.
- The Candi Surawana Temple is built in the Majapahit Kingdom (modern Indonesia).

== Births ==
- October 3 – Humphrey, Duke of Gloucester (d. 1447)
- December 27 – Anne de Mortimer, claimant to the English throne (d. 1411)
- date unknown
  - Moctezuma I, Aztec ruler of Tenochtitlan, son of Huitzilihuitl (d. 1469)
- probable
  - John Dunstaple, English composer (d. 1453)
  - Engelbrekt Engelbrektsson, Swedish statesman and rebel leader (d. 1436)
  - Contessina de' Bardi, politically active Florentine woman (d. 1473)
  - Jan van Eyck, Flemish painter (d. 1441)

== Deaths ==
- January 26 – Adolph IX, Count of Holstein-Kiel (b.c 1327)
- February 16 – Rupert I, Elector Palatine (b. 1309)
- March 20 – Alexios III Megas Komnenos, Emperor of Trebizond (b. 1338)
- April 19 – King Robert II of Scotland (b. 1316)
- July 8 – Albert of Saxony, Bishop of Halberstadt and German philosopher (b. c. 1320)
- August 14 – John FitzAlan, 2nd Baron Arundel, English soldier (b. 1364)
- September 23 – John I, Duke of Lorraine (b. 1346)
- October 9 – King John I of Castile (fall from a horse) (b. 1358)
- September – Towtiwil, Prince of Black Ruthenia
- date unknown
  - Sandaki Mari Djata, Mansa of the Mali Empire
  - Keratsa of Bulgaria, Byzantine empress consort (b. 1348)
  - Sa'ad al-Din Masud ibn Umar ibn Abd Allah al-Taftazani, Ilkhanate polymath (b. 1322)
  - Hafez, persian poet (d. 1325)
- probable – Altichiero, Italian painter (b. 1330)
