= Mari Djata =

Mari Djata can refer to:

- Sundiata Keita (c. 1217 – c. 1255), also called Mari Djata I, founder of the Mali Empire
- Mari Djata II of Mali, mansa of the Mali Empire from 1389 to 1390
- Sandaki (mansa), also called Sandaki Mari Djata, mansa of the Malicool Empire from 1389 to 1390
