= Hennon =

Hennon is a surname. Notable people with the surname include:

- Don Hennon (born c. 1938), American basketball player
- John Hennon, 15th-century Dutch philosopher
- Rodney Hennon (born 1969), American baseball player and coach

== See also ==
- Hennon Stadium, a baseball venue in Cullowhee, North Carolina, United States
