= 1473 =

1473 in various calendars
- Gregorian calendar: 1473; MCDLXXIII
- Ab urbe condita: 2226
- Armenian calendar: 922; ԹՎ ՋԻԲ
- Assyrian calendar: 6223
- Balinese saka calendar: 1394–1395
- Bengali calendar: 879–880
- Berber calendar: 2423
- English Regnal year: 12 Edw. 4 – 13 Edw. 4
- Buddhist calendar: 2017
- Burmese calendar: 835
- Byzantine calendar: 6981–6982
- Chinese calendar: 壬辰年 (Water Dragon); 4170 or 3963 — to — 癸巳年 (Water Snake); 4171 or 3964
- Coptic calendar: 1189–1190
- Discordian calendar: 2639
- Ethiopian calendar: 1465–1466
- Hebrew calendar: 5233–5234
- Hindu calendars
- Vikram Samvat: 1529–1530
- Shaka Samvat: 1394–1395
- Kali Yuga: 4573–4574
- Holocene calendar: 11473
- Igbo calendar: 473–474
- Iranian calendar: 851–852
- Islamic calendar: 877–878
- Japanese calendar: Bunmei 5 (文明５年)
- Javanese calendar: 1389–1390
- Julian calendar: 1473; MCDLXXIII
- Korean calendar: 3806
- Minguo calendar: 439 before ROC 民前439年
- Nanakshahi calendar: 5
- Thai solar calendar: 2015–2016
- Tibetan calendar: ཆུ་ཕོ་འབྲུག་ལོ་ (male Water-Dragon); 1599 or 1218 or 446 — to — ཆུ་མོ་སྦྲུལ་ལོ་ (female Water-Snake); 1600 or 1219 or 447

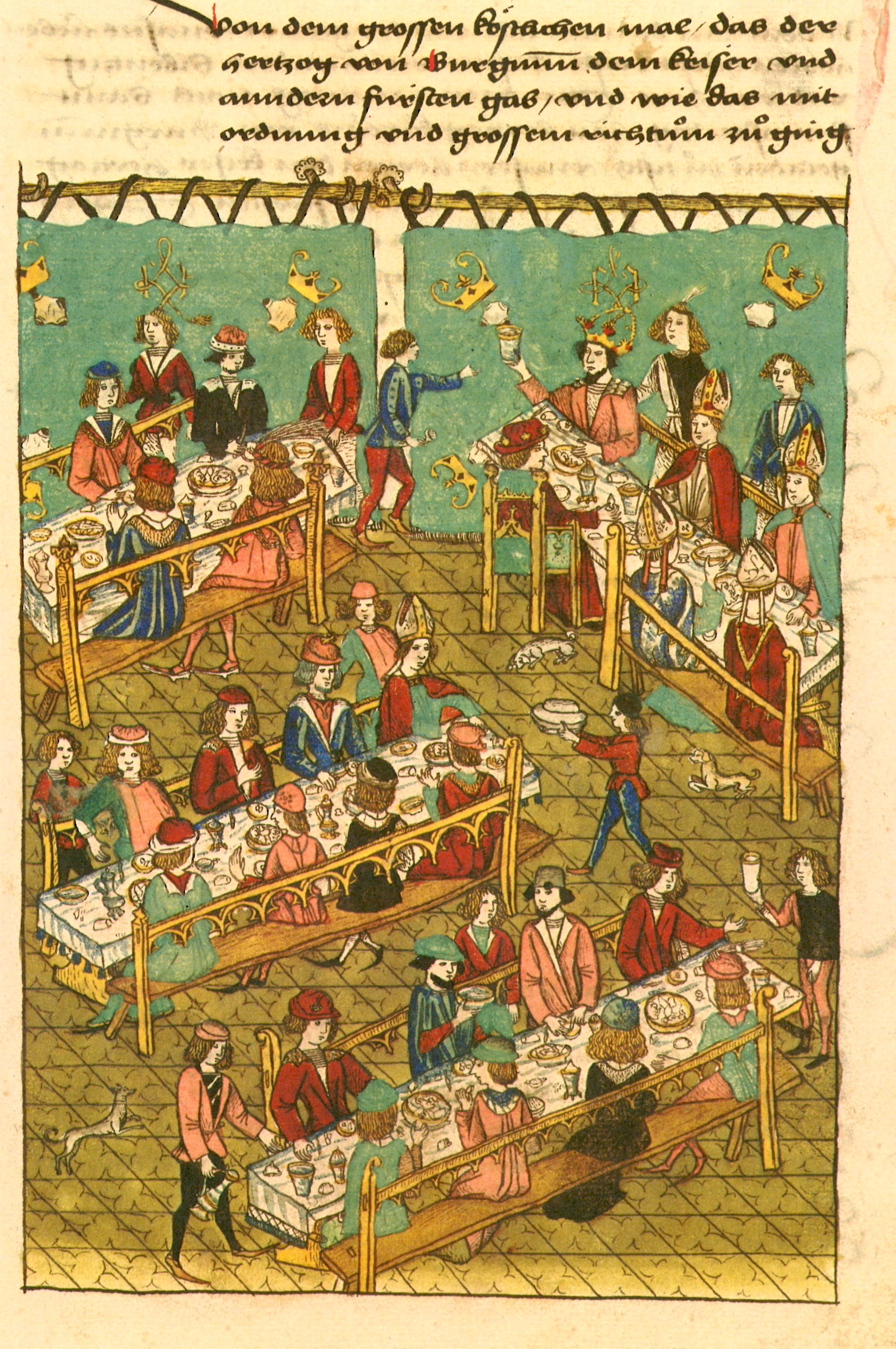
October 7: Charles the Bold, Duke of Burgundy holds a banquet at Trier for the leaders of the Holy Roman Empire and ends up alienating the guests.

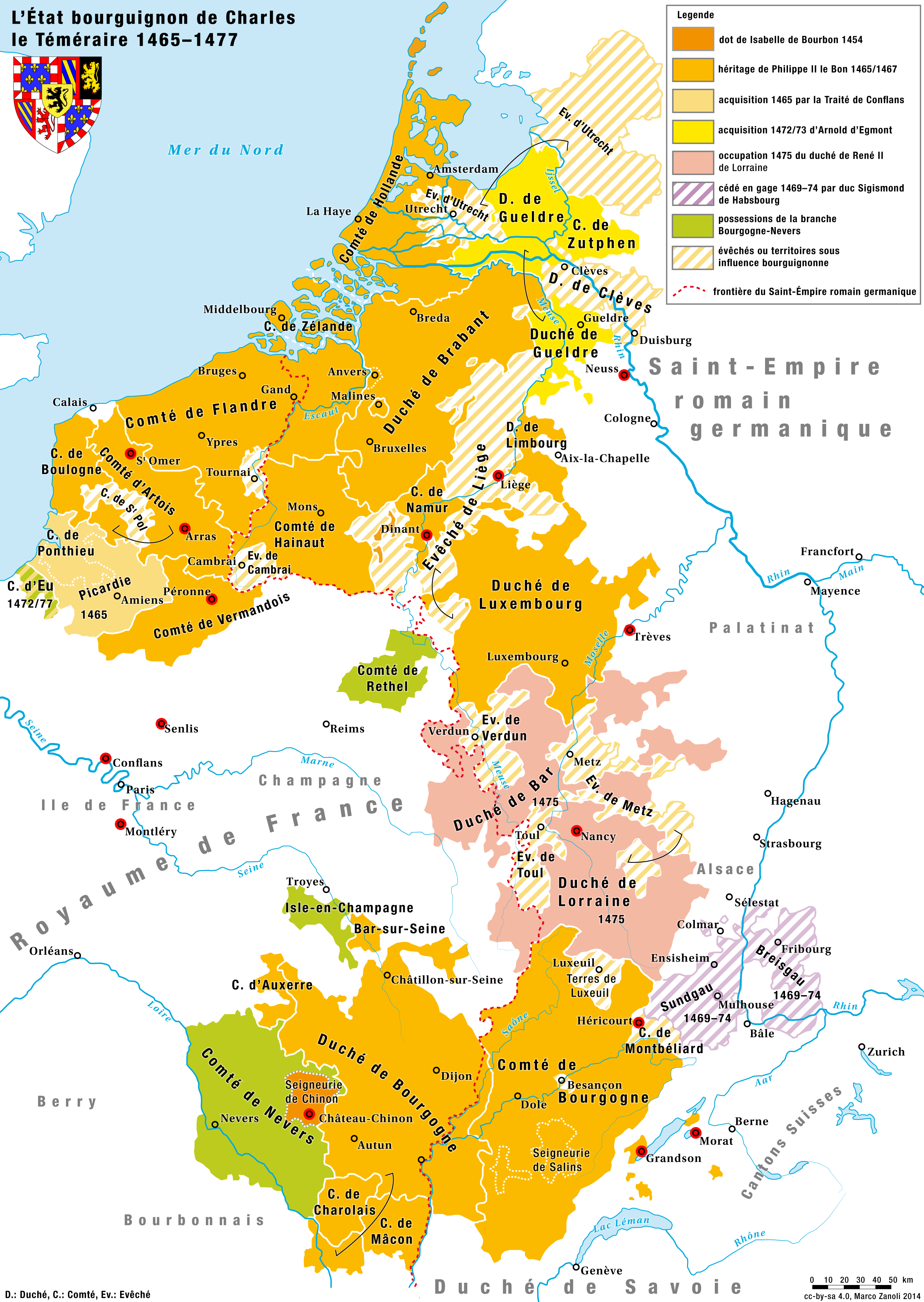
The proposed Kingdom of Burgundy that would have been ruled by Charles the Bold

Year 1473 (MCDLXXIII) was a common year starting on Friday of the Julian calendar.

== Events ==
=== January–March ===
- January 1 – The uninhabited island of Annobón, off of the coast of West Africa, is claimed by Portuguese explorers who name it in honor of the New Year. A year later, it becomes the home of enslaved Africans who either marry or work of Portuguese citizens, or sold.
- January 9 – Pope Sixtus IV lifts the order of interdict that had been placed by Pope Paul II on the late Bohemian King George of Poděbrady and his sons, granting absolution, after the sons convert to the Roman Catholic faith.
- January 22 – Muhammad Jiwa Shah becomes the new Sultan of Kedah, an absolute monarchy at the south of the Malay Peninsula and now part of Malaysia, upon the death of his father, Ataullah Muhammad Shah.
- February 12 – The first complete inside edition of Avicenna's The Canon of Medicine (Latin translation) is published in Milan.
- March 6 – The original University of Trier is founded in the Electorate of the Paletine in what is now Germany, 18 years after the Pope had granted the Archbishop of Trier, Jakob von Sierck, the papal dispensation to create a university. After 365 years, the university is closed in 1798, but re-established 172 years later in 1970.
- March 17 – An heir to the throne of Scotland is born to Queen Margaret and King James III. Prince James of the House of Stewart will become King James IV at the age of 15 in 1488.

=== April–June ===
- April 5 – Philip I, leader of the Russian Orthodox Church as Patriarch of Moscow since 1464, dies after a reign of almost nine years.
- May 7 – Pope Sixtus IV appoints eight clerics to the College of Cardinals, the most in his career, the most since December 18, 1439 when 17 were appointed by Pope Eugene IV.
- May 28 – The Earl of Oxford, commander of what remains of the Lancastrians during the Wars of the Roses against the Yorkists and King Edward IV of England, makes an unsuccessful attempt to land an army at Essex at the village of St Osyth.
- June 29 – Gerontius, Bishop of Kolomna is appointed as the new Patriarch of the Russian Orthodox Church.

=== July–September ===
- July 10 – James II, King of Cyprus, dies after a reign of nine years. In that his widow, the Queen Consort Catherine, is eight months pregnant with the couple's son, she becomes Queen Regent and the throne is deemed to remain vacant until the child is born.
- July 27 – René II, Count of Vaudémont becomes the new Duke of Lorraine, at the time an independent principality within the Holy Roman Empire, upon the death of his cousin, Nicholas I. after his mother, the Duchess Yolande gives up her rights to the throne.
- August 6 – King James III of Cyprus becomes the de jure monarch of Cyprus from the moment he is born, 27 days after the death of his father, King James II, although the rule of Cyprus is carried out by his mother, Catherine, Queen regent. King James III lives for only one year and 20 days before dying on August 26, 1474.
- August 11 – At the Battle of Otlukbeli, Ottoman Sultan Mehmed II defeats the White Sheep Turkmens, led by Uzun Hasan.
- August 13 – Nicolò Marcello is elected as the new Doge of Venice following the July 28 death of Nicolo Tron.
- September 7 – In Germany, Gerhard VII of Jülich-Berg destroys the Tomburg Castle near Wormersdorf in what is now the German state of North Rhine-Westphalia. The one-day shelling of the castle with cannons takes place after a dispute with the Lord of Tomburg, Friedrich von Sombreff. The castle is never rebuilt and the ruins remain more than 550 years later.
- September 30 –
  - The Earl of Oxford, John de Vere, seizes St Michael's Mount in Cornwall and defends it for the next five months against 6,000 troops of King Edward IV.
  - The Trier Conference begins in the German city of Trier as Frederick III, Holy Roman Emperor and Charles the Bold, Duke of Burgundy make a grand entry into the city of Trier for a meeting of central European leaders to respond to the threat of an invasion by the Ottoman Empire.

=== October–December ===
- October 1 – Johannes Hennon publishes the medical treatise Commentarii in Aristotelis libros Physicorum.
- October 7 – At Trier, Charles the Bold, Duke of Burgundy, hosts an elaborate banquet for the Holy Roman Emperor Frederick II and various prince-electors of the electorates within the Empire, ostensibly to work towards a common union of nations to begin a new crusade against the Ottomans, but offends most of his guests because of his arrogant ambition.
- October 18 – Albert IV of Bavaria becomes the first of the guests to walk out of the Duke of Burgundy banquet.
- October 31 – The Trier Conference breaks up after Charles the Bold fails to persuade the Holy Roman Emperor Frederick to help Charles become King of the Romans or to enter into an alliance against King Loouis XI of France. Frederick II instead proposes an alliance between the Empire, Burgundy, and France. Charles threatens to leave unless he can secure an alliance by a treaty marriage.
- November 4 – The negotiators for Burgundy and the Holy Roman Empire tentatively agree on creating a Kingdom of Burgundy, ruled by Charles the Bold, that would become a member of the Empire and that would include Burgundy, Holland, Luxembourg, Savoy, Lorraine and other parts of what are now the Netherlands, Belgium and France. A coronation ceremony for Charles as King of Burgundy is tentatively scheduled to take place on November 25.
- November 20 – The Battle of Vodna Stream, near Râmnicu Sărat, ends after two days in what is now Romania, Stephen the Great, Prince of Moldavia, routs the army of Wallachia, commanded by Prince Radu the Handsome. Prince Radu then flees to Dâmbovița.
- November 23 – Prince Stephen of Moldavia begins the siege of Dâmbovița Fortress, where Wallachia's Prince Radu has taken refuge in a war between the two monarchs. Prince Radu escapes during the night, leaving behind his wife, his daughter and his treasury, and the fortress surrenders the next day.
- November 25 – On the day set for the scheduled coronation at Trier of Charles the Bold as King of Burgundy, Charles learns that the Holy Roman Emperor Frederick had changed his mind and left overnight, and that the ceremony will never take place.
- December 7 – The first-known printed book about child care, Kinderbüchlein, is published by German physician Bartholomäus Metlinger.
- December 23 – Radu II returns as Prince of Wallachia one month after having been deposed briefly by Basarab the Old.

=== Date unknown ===
- Stephen the Great of Moldavia refuses to pay tribute to the Ottomans. This will attract an Ottoman invasion in 1475, resulting in the greatest defeat of the Ottomans so far.
- Axayacatl, Aztec ruler of Tenochtitlan, invades the territory of the neighboring Aztec city of Tlatelolco. The ruler of Tlatelolco is killed and replaced by a military governor; Tlatelolco loses its independence.
- Possible discovery of the island of "Bacalao" (possibly Newfoundland off North America) by Didrik Pining and João Vaz Corte-Real.
- The city walls and defensive moat are built in Celje, Slovenia.
- Almanach cracoviense ad annum 1474, an astronomical wall calendar, is published in Kraków, the oldest known printing in Poland.
- Florentine physician Marsilio Ficino becomes a Catholic priest.
- Possible date – Recuyell of the Historyes of Troye is the first book to be printed in English, by William Caxton, in Bruges.
- Severe heat and drought in Europe

== Births ==
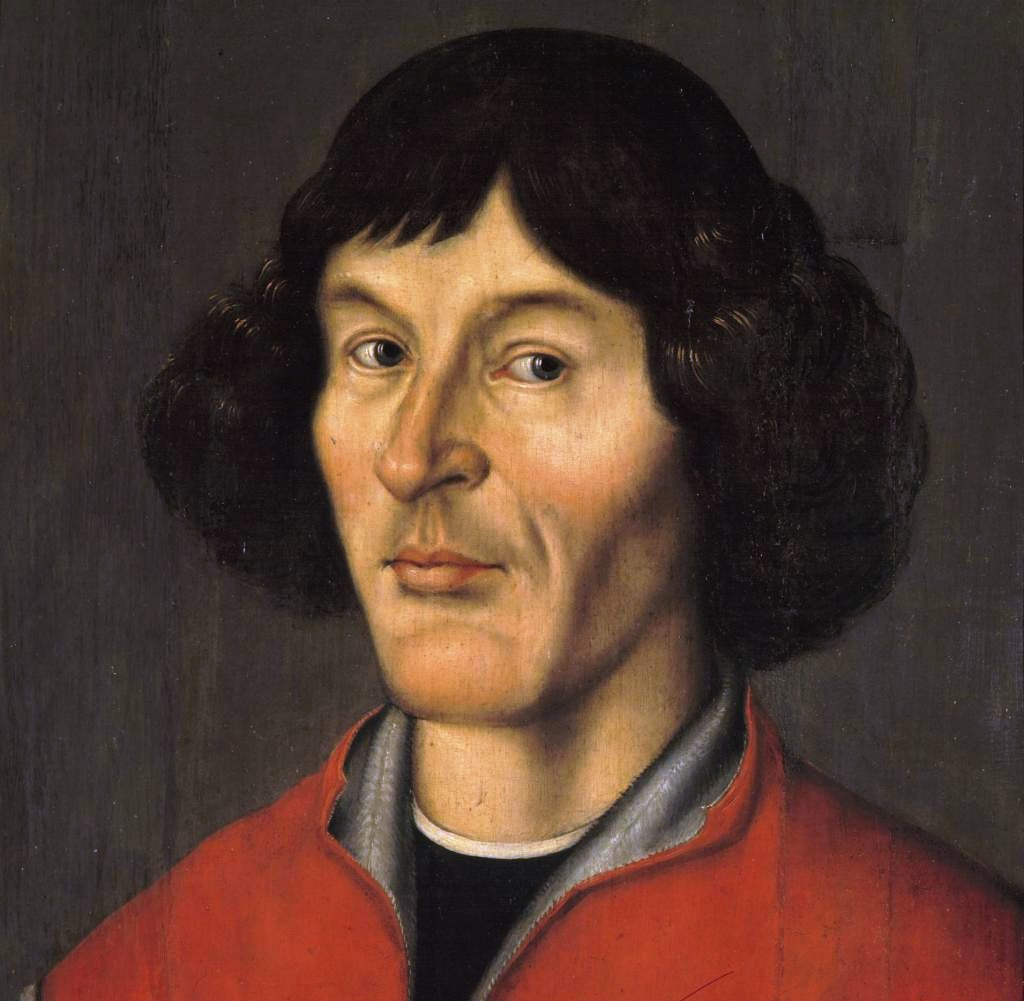
Nicolaus Copernicus

- February 19 – Nicolaus Copernicus, Polish astronomer and mathematician (d. 1543)
- February 25 – Al-Mutawakkil Yahya Sharaf ad-Din, Imam of the Zaidi state in Yemen (d. 1555)
- March 3 – Asakura Sadakage, 9th head of the Asakura clan (d. 1512)
- March 14 – Reinhard IV of Hanau-Münzenberg (1500–1512) (d. 1512)
- March 16 – Henry IV of Saxony (1539–1541) (d. 1541)
- March 17 – James IV, King of Scots from 11 June 1488 to his death (d. 1513)
- April 2 – John Corvinus, Hungarian noble (d. 1504)
- July 4 – Matilda of Hesse, German noblewoman (d. 1505)
- July 6 – James III of Cyprus, son of James II of Cyprus and Catherine Cornaro, king of Cyprus (d. 1474)
- July – Maddalena de' Medici, Italian noble (d. 1528)
- August 14 – Margaret Pole, 8th Countess of Salisbury (d. 1541)
- August 17 – Richard, Duke of York, one of the Princes in the Tower (d. 1483)
- August 25 – Margaret of Münsterberg, Duchess consort and regent of Anhalt (d. 1530)
- September 2 – Ercole Strozzi, Italian poet (d. 1508)
- September 23 – Thomas Lovett III, High Sheriff of Northamptonshire (d. 1542)
- September 24 – Georg von Frundsberg, German knight and landowner (d. 1528)
- October 26 – Friedrich of Saxony, Grand Master of the Teutonic Knights (d. 1510)
- date unknown – Thomas Howard, 3rd Duke of Norfolk, English Tudor politician (d. 1555)
- probable
  - Jean Lemaire de Belges, Walloon poet and historian (d. 1525)
  - Edward of Middleham, Prince of Wales, only son of Richard III of England (d. 1484)
  - Cecilia Gallerani, principal mistress of Ludovico Sforza, Duke of Milan (d. 1536)

== Deaths ==
- January 24 – Conrad Paumann, German composer (b. c. 1410)
- February 23 – Arnold, Duke of Guelders (b. 1410)
- April 3 – Alessandro Sforza, Italian condottiero (b. 1409)
- April 15 – Yamana Sōzen, Japanese daimyō and monk (b. 1404)
- May 8 – John Stafford, 1st Earl of Wiltshire, English politician (b. 1420)
- June 6 – Hosokawa Katsumoto, Japanese nobleman (b. 1430)
- June 28 – John Talbot, 3rd Earl of Shrewsbury, English nobleman (b. 1448)
- July 10 – James II of Cyprus (b. c. 1440)
- November 26 – Diego Fernández de la Cueva, 1st Viscount of Huelma
- October – Contessina de' Bardi, politically active Florentine woman (b. 1390)
- December 24 – John Cantius, Polish scholar and theologian (b. 1390)
- date unknown
  - Ewuare I, Oba of Benin
  - Jean Jouffroy, French prelate and diplomat (b. c. 1412)
  - Nicholas I of Lorraine (b. 1448)
  - Sigismondo Polcastro, Paduan physician and natural philosopher (b. 1384)
- probable – Marina Nani, Venetian dogaressa (b. c. 1400)
- probable – Patriarch Gennadios II of Constantinople (b. c. 1400)
