= Musa II =

Musa II may refer to:

- Musa II (mansa), mansa of the Mali Empire from 1374 to 1387
- Musa ibn Musa al-Qasawi (c. 790–862), leader of Banu Qasi in modern Northern Spain
