= 1384 =

1384 in various calendars
- Gregorian calendar: 1384; MCCCLXXXIV
- Ab urbe condita: 2137
- Armenian calendar: 833; ԹՎ ՊԼԳ
- Assyrian calendar: 6134
- Balinese saka calendar: 1305–1306
- Bengali calendar: 790–791
- Berber calendar: 2334
- English Regnal year: 7 Ric. 2 – 8 Ric. 2
- Buddhist calendar: 1928
- Burmese calendar: 746
- Byzantine calendar: 6892–6893
- Chinese calendar: 癸亥年 (Water Pig); 4081 or 3874 — to — 甲子年 (Wood Rat); 4082 or 3875
- Coptic calendar: 1100–1101
- Discordian calendar: 2550
- Ethiopian calendar: 1376–1377
- Hebrew calendar: 5144–5145
- Hindu calendars
- Vikram Samvat: 1440–1441
- Shaka Samvat: 1305–1306
- Kali Yuga: 4484–4485
- Holocene calendar: 11384
- Igbo calendar: 384–385
- Iranian calendar: 762–763
- Islamic calendar: 785–786
- Japanese calendar: Eitoku 4 / Shitoku 1 (至徳元年)
- Javanese calendar: 1297–1298
- Julian calendar: 1384; MCCCLXXXIV
- Korean calendar: 3717
- Minguo calendar: 528 before ROC 民前528年
- Nanakshahi calendar: −84
- Thai solar calendar: 1926–1927
- Tibetan calendar: ཆུ་མོ་ཕག་ལོ་ (female Water-Boar); 1510 or 1129 or 357 — to — ཤིང་ཕོ་བྱི་བ་ལོ་ (male Wood-Rat); 1511 or 1130 or 358

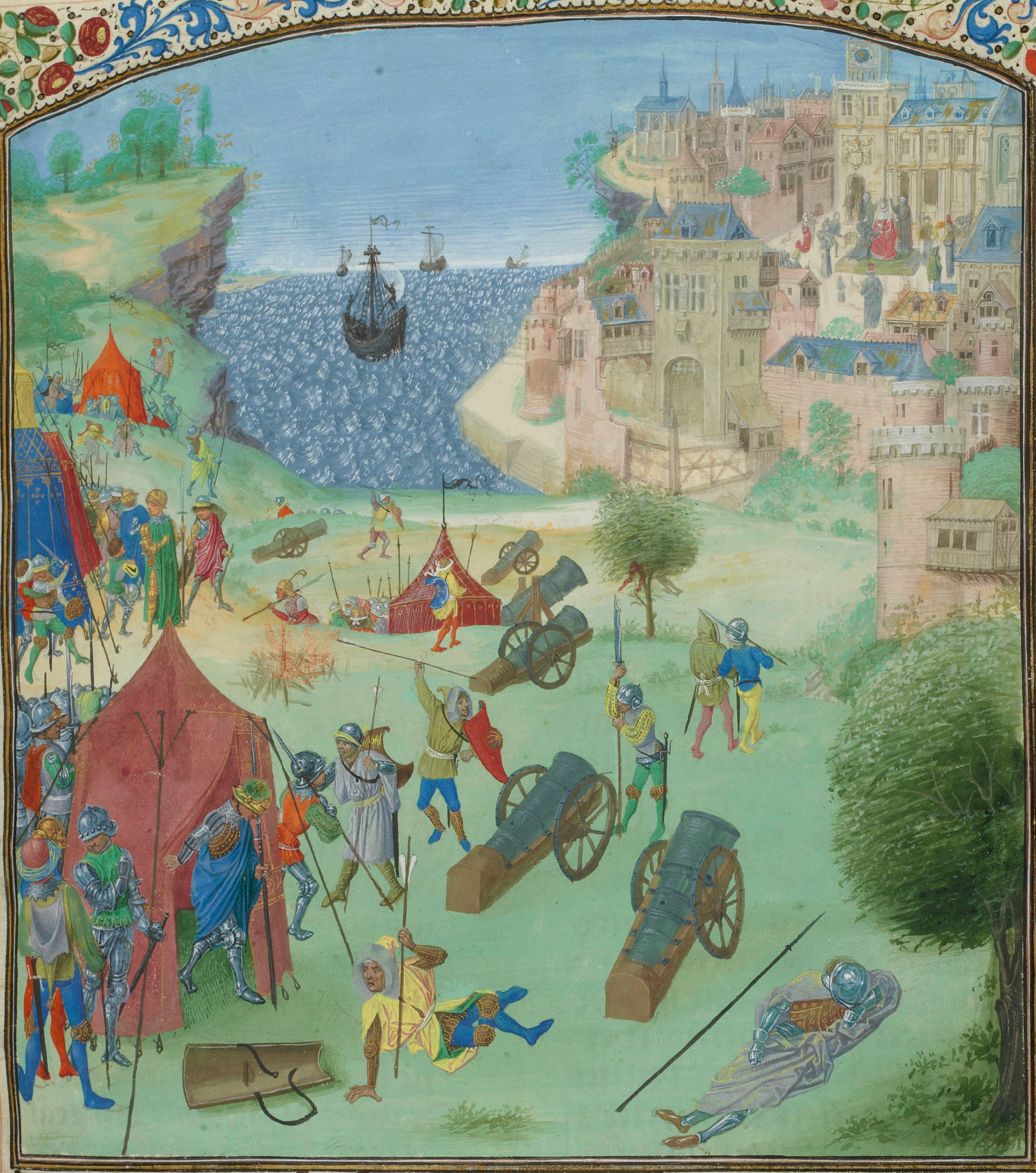
May 29 to September 3: The siege of Lisbon by the Kingdom of Castile is maintained for more than two months before the Castilians withdraw.

Year 1384 (MCCCLXXXIV) was a leap year starting on Friday of the Julian calendar.

== Events ==
=== January–March ===
- January 2 (10th waxing of Tabodwe, 745 ME) – King Binnya U of Burma's Hanthawaddy kingdom is killed in a rebellion at the capital, Bago. His 16-year-old son, Pasoom-Paing-Cek, is installed by the rebels as King Razadarit.
- January 26 – England and France agree to a truce and ceasefire in the ongoing Revolt of Ghent. The Kingdom of Scotland goes to war to retake Scottish territory occupied by the English Army.
- January 30 – Margaret III becomes the Countess of Flanders upon the death of her 53-year-old father, Count Louis II. Margaret and her husband Philip the Bold, Duke of Burgundy, become co-rulers of both Flanders and Burgundy.
- February 4 – Scottish forces make an attack against English occupation forces in Scotland and recapture Lochmaben Castle and Teviotdale.
- February 7 – Nicholas Brembre, Lord Mayor of London after defeating John Northampton's bid for re-election, arranges to have Northampton arrested on charges of sedition.
- February 11 – In protest of former mayor Northampton's arrest in London, local businessman and shoe manufacturer John Constantine incites other business owners to close their shops and to disrupt commerce. Constantine is then arrested and beheaded at Cheapside for leading an insurrection, and his severed head is placed on the Newgate entrance to the London Wall.
- March 3 – King Richard II of England summons the members of the House of Commons and the House of Lords to assemble at Salisbury on April 29.

=== April–June ===
- April 29 – The Parliament of England opens a four-week session at Salisbury at the palace of the Bishop of Salisbury. Sir James Pickering is elected as Speaker of the House of Commons for the third consecutive time of his career.
- May 27 – The English Parliament adjourns and King Richard II gives royal assent to laws passed during the session.
- May 29 – The army of the Crown of Castile army begins the siege of Lisbon, capital of the Kingdom of Portugal.
- June 15 – Antoniotto I Adorno is elected as Doge of the Republic of Genoa following the death of the Doge Leonardo Montaldo from bubonic plague the day before. Adorno serves as the Republic's chief executive until 1390.

=== July–September ===
- July 19 – Portugal's Navy, with 34 ships, breaks the Castilian blockade of the besieged city of Lisbon, defeating a force of 53 Castilian ships in the Battle of Tejo.
- July 26 – The Treaty of Heidelberg ends a fight between the Süddeutscher Städtebund (South German League of Cities, with 28 member cities) and the allies of Wenceslaus IV, King of Germany.
- August 5 – An earthquake strikes the island of Lesbos in Greece, killing numerous people including the Genoan Lord of Lesbos, Francesco I Gattilusio, along with his two eldest sons, Andronico and Domenico. His son Jacopo Gattiliuso survives and rules the island under the name Francesco II.
- August 16 – The Hongwu Emperor of Ming China hears a case of a couple who tore paper money notes, while fighting over them. Under the law, this is considered an act of destroying stamped government documents, which is to be punished by a caning with a bamboo rod of 100 strokes. However, the Emperor decides to pardon them, on the grounds that it was unintentional.
- September 3 – The siege of Lisbon by the Castilian Army ends as the Portuguese defenders protect the capital of the kingdom of Portugal.
- September 28 – King Richard II summons the English Parliament to meet on November 12.

=== October–December ===
- October 16 – At the age of 10, Jadwiga is crowned "King" of Poland in Kraków following the 1382 death of her father, King Louis of Hungary.
- November 12 – The 12th parliament of King Richard II assembles and elects James Pickering as Speaker of the House for the fourth consecutive time.
- November – John Earl of Buchan, the son of Robert II of Scotland was appointed as lieutenant of the kingdom of Scotland.
- December 14 – The second assembly in 1384 of the English Parliament is adjourned.
- December 25 – Use of the Spanish era dating system in the Crown of Castile is suppressed.

=== Unknown Date ===
- The Hongwu Emperor of Ming China reinstates the Imperial examination system for drafting scholar-officials to the civil service, after suspending the system since 1373, in favor of a recommendation system to office.
- The Nasrid princes of Al-Andalus replace Abu al-Abbas with Abu Faris Musa ibn Faris, as ruler of the Marinid dynasty in modern-day Morocco.
- Zain Al-Abidin succeeds his father, Shah Shuja, as ruler of the Muzaffarids in central Persia.
- Shortly before his death on the last day of the year, John Wycliffe sends out tracts against Pope Urban VI, who has not turned out to be the reformist Wycliffe had hoped.
- Qara Muhammad succeeds Bairam Khawaja, as ruler of the Kara Koyunlu ("Black Sheep Turkomans"), in modern-day Armenia and northern Iraq.
- Timur conquers the northern territories of the Jalayirid Empire, in western Persia.
- Katharine Lady Berkeley's School is founded in Gloucestershire, England.

== Births ==
- August – Antoine, Duke of Brabant (d. 1415)
- August 11 – Yolande of Aragon (d. 1442)
- date unknown
  - St Frances of Rome (d. 1440)
  - Khalil Sultan, ruler of Transoxiana (d. 1411)
  - Sigismondo Polcastro, Italian physician and natural philosopher (d. 1473)

== Deaths ==
- January 30 – Louis II, Count of Flanders (b. 1330)
- May – William Douglas, 1st Earl of Douglas, Scottish magnate (b.c. 1327)
- June 8 – Kan'ami, Japanese actor and playwright (b. 1333)
- August 6 – Francesco I of Lesbos
- August 20 – Geert Groote, Dutch founder of the Brethren of the Common Life (b. 1340)
- September 10 – Joanna of Dreux, Countess of Penthievre and nominal Duchess of Brittany (b. 1319)
- September 20 – Louis I, Duke of Anjou (b. 1339)
- October – Joan Holland, Duchess of Brittany (b. 1350)
- December 23 – Thomas Preljubović, ruler of Epirus
- December 31 – John Wycliffe, English theologian, Bible translator and Catholic reform campaigner
- date unknown
  - John of Fordun, Scottish chronicler
  - Peter of Enghien, Count of Lecce
  - Ruaidri mac Tairdelbach Ó Conchobair, King of Connacht
- probable – Liubartas, King of Galicia
- Muhammad Jamaluddin al-Makki al-Amili al-Jizzini also known as al-Shahid al-Awwal, author of al-Lum'ah al-Dimashqiyah (b. ca 1334)
