= 1330 =

1330 in various calendars
- Gregorian calendar: 1330; MCCCXXX
- Ab urbe condita: 2083
- Armenian calendar: 779; ԹՎ ՉՀԹ
- Assyrian calendar: 6080
- Balinese saka calendar: 1251–1252
- Bengali calendar: 736–737
- Berber calendar: 2280
- English Regnal year: 3 Edw. 3 – 4 Edw. 3
- Buddhist calendar: 1874
- Burmese calendar: 692
- Byzantine calendar: 6838–6839
- Chinese calendar: 己巳年 (Earth Snake); 4027 or 3820 — to — 庚午年 (Metal Horse); 4028 or 3821
- Coptic calendar: 1046–1047
- Discordian calendar: 2496
- Ethiopian calendar: 1322–1323
- Hebrew calendar: 5090–5091
- Hindu calendars
- Vikram Samvat: 1386–1387
- Shaka Samvat: 1251–1252
- Kali Yuga: 4430–4431
- Holocene calendar: 11330
- Igbo calendar: 330–331
- Iranian calendar: 708–709
- Islamic calendar: 730–731
- Japanese calendar: Gentoku 2 (元徳２年)
- Javanese calendar: 1242–1243
- Julian calendar: 1330; MCCCXXX
- Korean calendar: 3663
- Minguo calendar: 582 before ROC 民前582年
- Nanakshahi calendar: −138
- Thai solar calendar: 1872–1873
- Tibetan calendar: ས་མོ་སྦྲུལ་ལོ་ (female Earth-Snake); 1456 or 1075 or 303 — to — ལྕགས་ཕོ་རྟ་ལོ་ (male Iron-Horse); 1457 or 1076 or 304

Year 1330 (MCCCXXX) was a common year starting on Monday of the Julian calendar.

== Events ==
=== January–December ===
- May – Odoric of Pordenone narrates the story of his 10 years of missionary travel to China, from which he is newly returned, to Friar William of Solagna in Padua, who records it as the Relatio.
- July 28 – Battle of Velbazhd: The Bulgarians under Tsar Michael Shishman (who is mortally wounded) are beaten by the Serbs. Bulgaria does not lose any territory to Serbia, but is powerless to stop the Serbian advance towards the predominantly Bulgarian-populated Macedonia.
- October 19 – King Edward III of England starts his personal reign, arresting his regent Roger Mortimer, and having him executed.
- November 9–12 – Battle of Posada: The Wallachians, under Basarab I, defeat the Hungarians, though heavily outnumbered, thus making a firm statement towards the independence of Wallachia.
- December 6 – The British Isles are hit by a great storm, creating large areas of sand dunes on Anglesey.
- Undated
  - Ivan Alexander becomes the despot of Lovech.
  - Vilnius, Lithuania receives its coat-of-arms, granted to the city in the seventh year of its existence.

== Births ==
- June 15 – Edward the Black Prince, son of Edward III of England (d. 1376)
- July 4 – Ashikaga Yoshiakira, Japanese shōgun (d. 1367)
- October 25 – Louis II of Flanders (d. 1384)
- date unknown
  - Frans Ackerman, Flemish statesman (d. 1387)
  - Euphemia of Sicily, princess regent of Sicily (d. 1359)
  - Altichiero, Italian painter (d. 1390)
  - Nicolas Flamel, French scribe and manuscript-seller, reputed alchemist (d. 1417)
  - John Gower, English poet (d. 1410)

== Deaths ==
- January 13 – Duke Frederick I of Austria (b. 1286)
- January 21 – Joan II, Countess of Burgundy, queen dowager of France (b. 1291)
- March 19 – Edmund of Woodstock, 1st Earl of Kent, son of Edward I and brother of Edward II (executed by Roger Mortimer) (b. 1301)
- May 3 – Alexios II Megas Komnenos, Emperor of Trebizond (b. 1282)
- c. July 31 – Tsar Michael Shishman of Bulgaria (b. 1280s?)
- August 2 – Yolande of Dreux, Queen of Scotland (b. 1263).
- August 25 – On or about this date, Sir James Douglas, Scottish guerilla leader during the Wars of Scottish Independence (b. circa 1286)
- September 28 – Elizabeth of Bohemia, queen consort of Bohemia (b. 1292)
- November 29 – Roger Mortimer, 1st Earl of March, de facto ruler of England (b. 1287)
- date unknown
  - Pietro Cavallini, Italian artist (b. 1259)
  - Guillaume Durand, French clergyman
  - Immanuel the Roman, Italian scholar and poet (b. 1270)
  - Maximus Planudes, Byzantine grammarian and theologian
  - Uthman ibn Abi al-Ula, Marinid prince and shaykh al-ghuzat of the Emirate of Granada

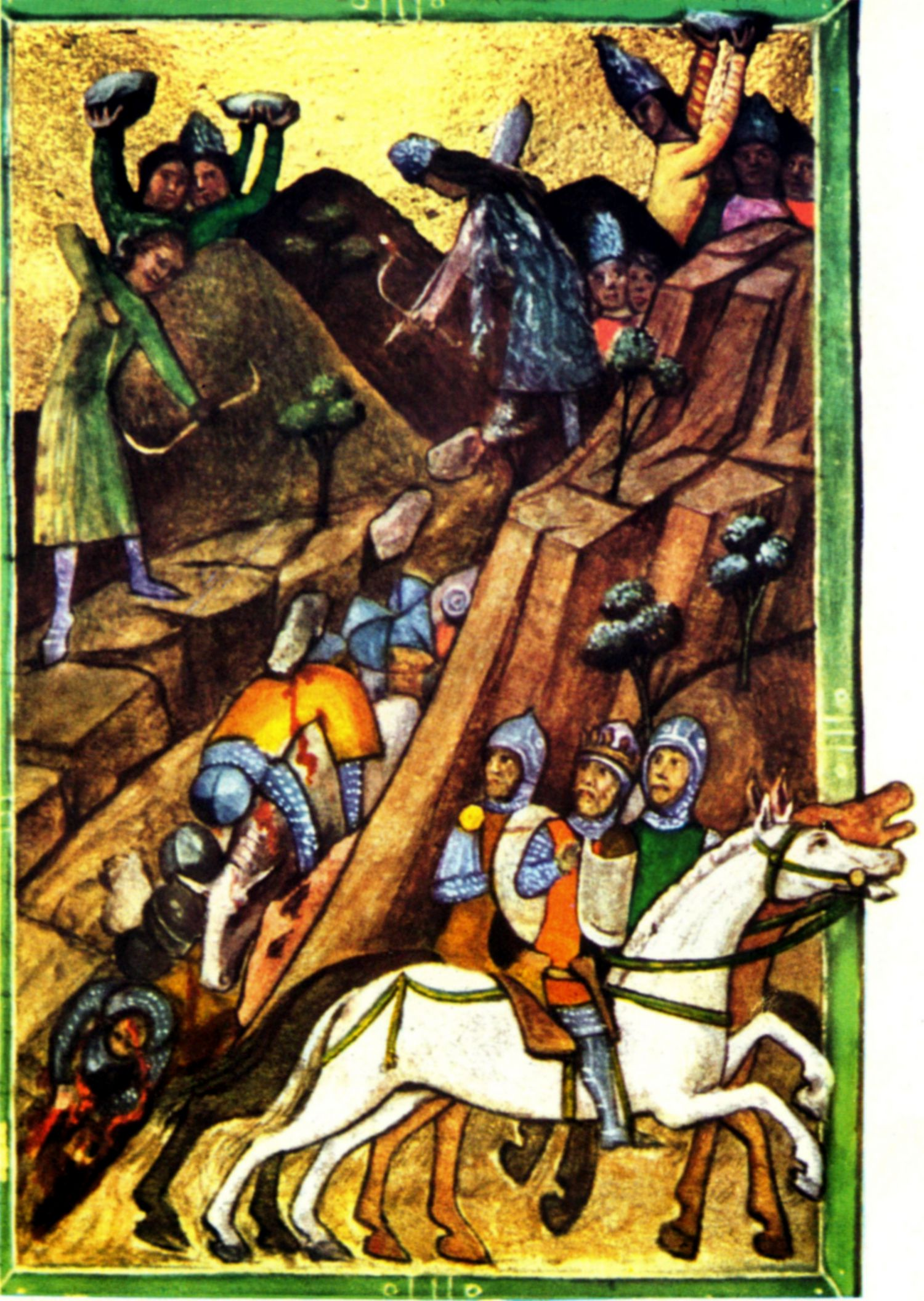
The Battle of Posada (November 9–12, 1330) in Chronicon Pictum. The Basarab I of Wallachia's army ambushes Charles Robert of Anjou, king of Hungary and his 30,000-strong invading army. The Vlach (Romanian) warriors roll down rocks over the cliff edges in a place where the Hungarian mounted knights cannot escape from them nor climb the heights to dislodge the attackers.
