= 1319 =

1319 in various calendars
- Gregorian calendar: 1319; MCCCXIX
- Ab urbe condita: 2072
- Armenian calendar: 768; ԹՎ ՉԿԸ
- Assyrian calendar: 6069
- Balinese saka calendar: 1240–1241
- Bengali calendar: 725–726
- Berber calendar: 2269
- English Regnal year: 12 Edw. 2 – 13 Edw. 2
- Buddhist calendar: 1863
- Burmese calendar: 681
- Byzantine calendar: 6827–6828
- Chinese calendar: 戊午年 (Earth Horse); 4016 or 3809 — to — 己未年 (Earth Goat); 4017 or 3810
- Coptic calendar: 1035–1036
- Discordian calendar: 2485
- Ethiopian calendar: 1311–1312
- Hebrew calendar: 5079–5080
- Hindu calendars
- Vikram Samvat: 1375–1376
- Shaka Samvat: 1240–1241
- Kali Yuga: 4419–4420
- Holocene calendar: 11319
- Igbo calendar: 319–320
- Iranian calendar: 697–698
- Islamic calendar: 718–719
- Japanese calendar: Bunpō 3 / Gen'ō 1 (元応元年)
- Javanese calendar: 1230–1231
- Julian calendar: 1319; MCCCXIX
- Korean calendar: 3652
- Minguo calendar: 593 before ROC 民前593年
- Nanakshahi calendar: −149
- Thai solar calendar: 1861–1862
- Tibetan calendar: ས་ཕོ་རྟ་ལོ་ (male Earth-Horse); 1445 or 1064 or 292 — to — ས་མོ་ལུག་ལོ་ (female Earth-Sheep); 1446 or 1065 or 293

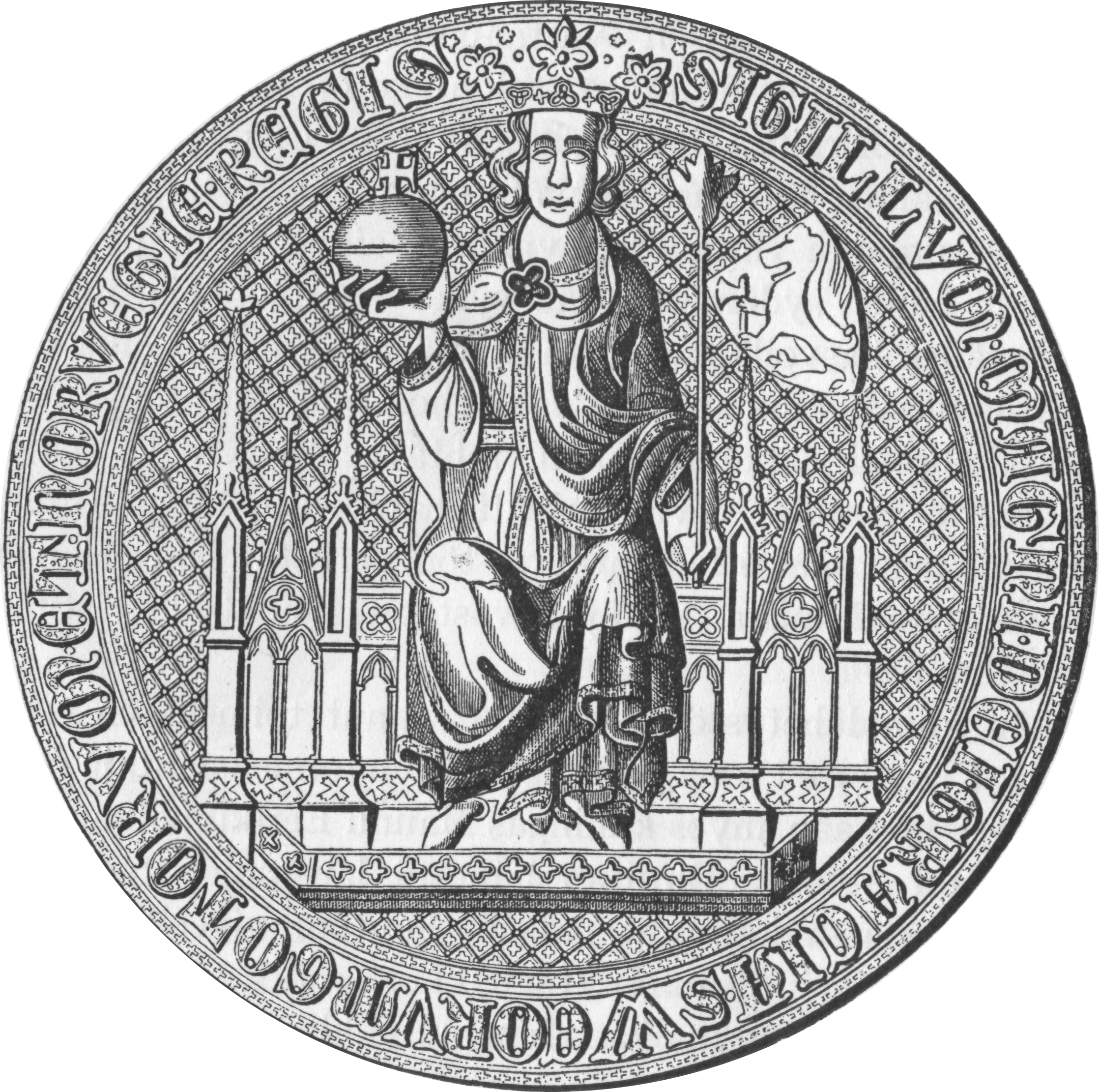
Seal of King Magnus Eriksson (1316–1374)

Year 1319 (MCCCXIX) was a common year starting on Monday of the Julian calendar.

== Events ==
=== January – March ===
- January 14 – The Earl of Pembroke and the Earl of Hereford persuade Walter Reynolds, Archbishop of Canterbury, to consecrate Stephen Gravesend as the Bishop of London.
- January 20 – A convocation at York is held by order of the Archbishop, William Melton, after orders sent by him to the Bishops of Durham and of Carlisle on November 28, 1318 to bring all abbots, priors, archdeacons and convents in their jurisdiction to appear before him "in octabis Sancti Hilarii proxime futuris" (on the next octave of Saint Hillary).
- February 6 – (14 Dhu al-Hijjah 718 AH) Rumaythah ibn Abi Numayy and Sayf al-Din Bahadur al-Ibrahimi, both former Emirs of Mecca, are arrested by the incumbent Emir, Shams al-Din Aq Sunqur al-Nasiri and taken from Mecca to Cairo for imprisonment. Rumaythah is charged with having provided support to his brother, Humaydah ibn Abi Numayy and al-Ibrahimi is accused of allowing Humaydah to escape. Rumaythah is pardoned a month later after arriving in Cairo.
- March 14 – The Military Order of Christ (Ordem Militar de Cristo) is established in Portugal by King Denis of Portugal after Pope John XXII issues the papal bull Ad ea ex quibus. The new Order is the revival of former Knights Templar who had aided the Kingdom of Portugal in its post-war reconstruction.

=== April – June ===
- April 19 – Philip I, Prince of Taranto, in his capacity as King of Albania, gives the title of Philip, Despot of Romania to his second eldest son Prince Philip II. Despite the mention of Romania, the despotate is a part of Albania, and the title gives rights of Philip II to Epirus in Greece.
- May 8 – King Haakon V Magnusson of Norway dies at the age of 49 with no sons, leaving the throne empty until the nobles can agree on his successor. Havtore Jonsson manages a guardianship government until the nobles choose Magnus VII Eriksson, son of Haakon's daughter Ingeborg.
- June 20 – Within the Mongol Empire, Özbeg Khan of the Golden Horde (the Mongol-controlled area of what is now Uzbekistan and Russia) fights a battle against the Ilkhanate (the Mongol-controlled Middle East) in an attempt to expand the Golden Horde's territory, with a confrontation in Ilkhanate territory at Mianeh (now in Iran). The troops of Özbeg Khan are supplemented with rebels led by an Ilkhanate prince, Yasa'ur. The Ilkhan Sultan, Abu Sa'id Bahadur Khan and his general, Amir Chupan, lead the defenders to victory and take many of the rebel officers prisoner. Afterward, 36 emirs and seven viceroys are executed for treason, including Qurumushi of Georgia and Irinjin of Anatolia.
- June 25 – Battle of the Vega of Granada: Castilian forces of 12,000 troops, led by the regents Don Pedro of Castile and Don Juan of Castile are defeated by a Moorish relief army at Granada during their attempt. Both regents are killed in the fighting. Pedro and Juan had summoned their Castilian vassals to assemble an expeditionary army in Córdoba, as part of an attempt to restore the deposed Sultan Nasr to the Granadan throne.

=== July – September ===
- July 8 – Magnus Eriksson is elected King of Sweden. His mother Ingeborg of Norway is given a place in the regency.
- July 21 – Canonization of Thomas Aquinas: The taking of testimony from more than 40 witnesses is started by Bishop Uberto d'Ormont of Naples, Bishop Angelo Tignosi of Viterbo, and notary Pandulpho de Sabbello, and will continue until September 18.
- July 23 – Battle of Chios: A Knights Hospitaller-Genoese fleet (some 30 ships) led by Albert of Schwarzburg defeats a Turkish fleet, off Chios.
- August 12 – The Duchy of Bavaria, split between two brothers since 1294, is reunited upon the death of Rudolf the Stammerer, Duke of Upper Bavaria. Ludwig the Barbarian, King of the Romans and Duke of Lower Bavaria. In 1328, Ludwig will later be elected the Holy Roman Emperor as Louis IV.
- August 14 – At the age of 11, Henry the Child becomes the Margrave of Brandenburg in Germany upon the death of his first cousin and guardian, Waldemar the Great. Because of Henry's age, the Duke of Pomerania, Wartislaw IV controls as Brandenburg as regent. Upon Henry II's death 11 months later, the House of Ascania's dynasty over Brandenburg will come to an end.
- August – Magnus Eriksson, grandson of the recently deceased king Haakon V and already proclaimed King of Sweden, is recognized by the Norwegian assembly as King Magnus VII of Norway, thus establishing a personal union with Sweden and Norway.
- September 6 – As a reward for his victory at the Battle of Mianeh, General Chupan of the Ilkhanate is allowed to marry Sati Beg, the sister of the Ilkhanate Sultan Abu Sa'id.
- September 13 – Pope John XXII issues the papal bull "Imminente Nobis", declaring that the Pope has the right of appointment to all clerical offices (archbishops, bishops, abbots, priors and collegiate and monasterial leaders) in the Roman Catholic Church, ending the right of the individual chapters to elect their own leaders.
- September 20 – Battle of Myton: Scottish forces (some 15,000 men) led by James the Black, Lord Douglas, defeat an English army in an encounter known as the "Chapter of Myton" because of the large number of clergymen involved. David Dalrymple, Lord Hailes, writes 460 years later, "The English were instantly routed. Three thousand were left dead on the field, and great part of fugitives drowned in the Swale. In this action there fell three thousand ecclesiastics, [20th September.] According to the savage peasantry of those times, this rout was termed by the Scots, the Chapter of Mitton." After the battle, King Edward II is forced to raise the siege at Berwick Castle and retreats south of the River Trent, allowing the Scots to ravage Cumberland and Westmorland unmolested. Queen Isabella, who is in York at this time, manages to escape to safety at Nottingham.

=== October – December ===
- October 17 – Prince James of Aragon marries the 12-year-old Princess Leonor of Castile at Gandesa, but announces at the conclusion of the mass that "his decision was to never rule" the Crown of Aragon as a sovereign or even to remain in secular life, but to instead enter a monastery to pursue a life "under a religious rule." King Jaime II informs Leonor's grandmother (Queen Maria de Molina) of the situation on October 22, and Queen Maria demands the return of Leonor immediately. Having renounced his royal rights, Prince Jaime finds afterward that he will not be allowed to enter a monastery either.
- October 29 – (Gen'ō 1, 15th day of 9th month) Nichiin of Japan's Daimoku sect refutes all other sects of Buddhism during an interrogation by the Kamakura shogunate, permitting the sect to continue.
- November 13 – King Eric VI of Denmark dies after a 33-year reign at Roskilde, leaving a vacancy that will not be filled until the January election of his brother Christopher II. During his rule, he attempts to control the routes of the Hanseatic League. The Hanse, an association of Baltic merchants, expels the English and Scots, and gains a monopoly of trade with Norway.
- December 21 – Representatives of England's King Edward II and Scotland's King Robert the Bruce sign a two-year truce. Hostilities are to cease until Christmas Day, 1321, with the Scots to build no new castles in the sheriffdoms of Berwick, Roxburgh, and Dumfries, and the English were to either transfer the Harbottle garrison in Northumberland to Scotland, or to destroy it. A long-term peace is still far off because of Edward's arrogant refusal to relinquish his claims of sovereignty over the Scots.

== Births ==
- March 20 – Laurence Hastings, English nobleman (d. 1348)
- April 26 – John the Good, king of France (d. 1364)
- September 5 – Peter IV, king of the Crown of Aragon (d. 1387)
- date unknown
  - Andrea II Muzaka, Albanian nobleman (d. 1372)
  - Charles of Blois-Châtillon, French nobleman (d. 1364)
  - Giulia della Rena, Italian nun, friar and saint (d. 1367)
  - Hasan Kuchak, Mongol nobleman and prince (d. 1343)
  - Haydar Amuli, Persian mystic and philosopher (d. 1385)
  - Henry V of Iron, Polish nobleman and knight (d. 1369)
  - James I, French nobleman and prince du sang (d. 1362)
  - Joan of Penthièvre, Breton noblewoman (d. 1384)
  - Kikuchi Takemitsu, Japanese general (d. 1373)
  - Leonardo di Montaldo, doge of Genoa (d. 1384)
  - María de la Cerda, Spanish noblewoman (d. 1375)
  - Märta Ulfsdotter, Swedish noblewoman (d. 1371)
  - Matteo II, Italian nobleman and co-ruler (d. 1355)
  - Philip III, French nobleman and knight (d. 1337)
  - Robert Marney, English knight and politician (d. 1400)
  - Stephen II, German nobleman and co-ruler (d. 1375)
  - Walter Paveley, English nobleman and knight (d. 1375)
  - William Dacre, English nobleman and knight (d. 1361)

== Deaths ==
- January 12 – Kamāl al-Dīn al-Fārisī, Persian scientist (b. 1267)
- May 8 – Haakon V Magnusson, king of Norway (b. 1270)
- May 19 – Louis of Évreux, son of King Philip the Bold (b. 1276)
- June 25 – (Battle of the Vega of Granada)
  - John of Castile, Spanish nobleman and prince (b. 1262)
  - Peter of Castile, Spanish nobleman and prince (b. 1290)
- August 12 – Rudolf I, German nobleman and knight (b. 1274)
- August 14 – Waldemar the Great, German nobleman (b. 1280)
- September 23 – Henry of Wierzbna, Polish priest and bishop
- October 18 – William Montagu, English nobleman and knight
- November 1 – Uguccione della Faggiuola, Italian condottieri
- November 2 – John Sandale, English bishop and chancellor
- November 5 – Simone Ballachi, Italian monk and friar (b. 1240)
- November 8 – Bokguk, Korean Grand Princess and queen
- November 11 – Beatrice of Luxembourg, queen of Hungary
- November 13 – Eric VI Menved, king of Denmark (b. 1274)
- December 28 – Mattia de Nazarei, Italian abbess (b. 1253)
- date unknown
  - Agnes Haakonsdatter, Norwegian princess (b. 1290)
  - Andrea I, Albanian prince (House of Muzaka) (b. 1279)
  - Bernard VI, French nobleman (House of Armagnac)
  - Guan Daosheng, Chinese painter and poet (b. 1262)
  - Ingeborg Magnusdotter, queen of Denmark (b. 1277)
  - Jan Sindewint, Flemish monk, theologian and writer
  - Jordan Óge de Exeter, Anglo-Irish knight and sheriff
  - Qadi Baydawi, Persian jurist, theologian and writer
  - Remigio dei Girolami, Italian theologian and writer
