= John Hennon =

Dutch philosopher

John (Johannes) Hennon (died after 1484) was a Dutch medieval philosopher in the late Scholastic tradition. He was from Nijmegen, and studied at the University of Paris, where he received his magister artium and baccalaureus formatus in sacra pagina (1463).

As a student of Paris, Hennon was heavily influenced by William of Ockham and Roger Bacon. He wrote a Latin commentary on the Physics of Aristotle, the Commentarii in Aristotelis libros Physicorum, which was completed on 1 October 1473 if a seventeenth-century source is to be believed. Examining the state of science in the late Middle Ages, physicist, historian, and philosopher Pierre Duhem, in Le système du monde, isolates Hennon's account of the vacuum and a plurality of worlds.

Hennon believed that nature abhors a vacuum and therefore no natural void was possible, though God could create one. A void, however, is not defined by a positive distance between surfaces in which there is nothing, but rather as the capacity (potentialitas) for a body to be interposed between the two surfaces equal to that which is there when it is full. Hennon affirms that ice is denser than liquid water, and that a sealed vase of water will break upon freezing because nature abhors a vacuum. He believes further that two smooth plates could not be separated (again, because nature abhors a vacuum) unless there were some air still between them, which with enough force may become rarefied, allowing the plates to be separated.

Hennon is less original on a plurality of worlds, where he borrows text verbatim from Albert of Saxony's Quaestiones in libros de Caelo et Mundo. He follows Albert and John Buridan in asserting that a multiplicity of worlds is not contradictory and therefore possible through divine omnipotence. In fact, God could create an infinite multitude of beings, since Hennon finds no contradiction between infinity and magnitude. Duhem in his analysis of Hennon's chapter De Caelo et Mundo, argues that Hennon relied on the Condemnations of 1277 by Stephen Tempier to attack Aristotelian physics, and thus the position that the earth cannot move.

== Sources ==
- Duhem, Pierre (1985). Ariew, Roger (ed.). Medieval Cosmology: Theories of Infinity, Place, Time, Void, and the Plurality of Worlds. Translated by Ariew, Roger. Chicago: University of Chicago Press. ISBN 0-226-16922-7.
