= Maghan III =

Magha

Mansa of Mali
- Reign: c. 1390 – c. 1415
- Predecessor: Sandaki
- Died: Mali Empire
Names
- Mamudu Keita
- Dynasty: Keita
- Religion: Islam

Maghan III, also known as Mahmud I, was mansa of the Mali Empire from 1390 to about 1415, although the date for the end of his reign is highly speculative. He assumed the throne after killing the usurper Sandaki, who had ruled for only two years. He came from the 'pagan lands' to the south of the empire, and claimed to be descended from Mansa Qu, thereby restoring the descendants of Sunjata to the throne, occupied since Mansa Musa by descendants of Mande Bori. Upon his ascension he took the regnal name 'Maghan'.

He may have been succeeded by Musa III, but the line of Mansas in the 15th century is generally poorly known.

== See also ==
- Mali Empire
- Keita Dynasty
