= Maghan II =

Ruler Of Mali Empire

Maghan

Mansa of Mali
- Reign: c. 1387 – c. 1389
- Predecessor: Musa II
- Successor: Sandaki
- Died: Mali Empire
- Dynasty: Keita
- Father: Mari Djata II
- Religion: Islam

Maghan II or Kita Tenin Maghan was a mansa of the Mali Empire from 1387 to 1389. He was the son of Mansa Mari Diata II and the brother of Mansa Musa II.

Tunisian historian Ibn Khaldun records that Maghan II succeeded his brother to the throne in 1387, but reigned for only around one year before he was assassinated 1389. Oral histories, however, maintain that he fled to the upper Niger river region, establishing the Hamana branch of the Keita clan.

== See also ==
- Mali Empire
- Keita dynasty

Preceded by Musa II	Mansa of the Mali Empire; 1387–1389	Succeeded by Sandaki
