= Sandaki (mansa) =

Mansa of Mali

Mari Djata

Mansa of Mali
- Reign: c. 1389 – c. 1390
- Predecessor: Maghan II
- Successor: Mahmud
- Died: c. 1390; Mali Empire
- Burial: Keita
- Religion: Islam

Sandaki, also known as Sandiki or Santigi, was the Mansa of the Mali Empire from 1388 to 1389. According to Ibn Khaldun Sandaki was not his name but rather his title, the Mandinka word for 'vizier'. His real name is unknown.

== Rule ==
Sandaki was a member of the imperial council and married to the mother of Mansa Musa II. When Mansa Musa II died in 1387, the throne went to his brother Maghan II, but he was killed about a year later. Sandaki took power for himself, but was soon killed by Mahmud, a descendant of Sundiata based in the pagan south.

== See also ==
- Mali Empire
- Keita Dynasty

Preceded by Maghan II	Mansa of the Mali Empire; 1389–1390	Succeeded by Maghan III
