= Sigismondo Polcastro =

Italian physician and natural philosopher

Sigismondo Polcastro (1384–1473) was an Italian physician and natural philosopher. He was born to a jurist father, Girolamo, of the ancient de Porcastris family of Vicenza, and Maddalena Volpe of Padua. Perhaps born in Vicenza, he moved to Padua while he was still a boy.

He received a doctorate in arts from the University of Padua in 1412, taught natural philosophy from 1419, obtained a doctorate in medicine in 1424, and taught medicine from 1426 to 1464 or 1465. He wrote several short medical works.

In 2016, he was pronounced the progenitor of the largest group of mathematicians in the Mathematics Genealogy Project, which groups mathematicians by teacher–student mentoring relationships, via his student Pietro Roccabonella.
