= Musa II of Mali =

Fadima Musa

Mansa of Mali
- Reign: c. 1374 – 1387
- Predecessor: Mari Djata II
- Successor: Maghan II
- Died: 1387; Mali Empire
- Dynasty: Keita
- Father: Mari Diata II
- Religion: Islam

Musa II was the mansa of the Mali Empire from 1374 to 1387.

Musa II took the throne following the death of his father, Mansa Mari Diata II. He turned away from the tyrannical practices of his father, but was sidelined by a powerful vizier named Mari Djata. During his reign the eastern provinces centered around Gao began to split off from the empire. A war with the Berbers for control of Gao devastated the city. Mari Djata's troops, however, laid siege to Takedda (or, according to another interpretation, Tadmekka) and forced a peace deal.

Upon his death in 1387, Musa II was succeeded by his brother Maghan II.

== See also ==
- Mali Empire
- Keita Dynasty

Preceded by Mari Diata II	Mansa of the Mali Empire; 1374–1387	Succeeded by Maghan II
