= 1390s =

Decade

The 1390s was a decade of the Julian Calendar which began on January 1, 1390, and ended on December 31, 1399.

== Events ==
=== 1390 ===
==== January–December ====
- January 19 – The Treaty of Lyck confirms an alliance between Vytautas and the Teutonic Knights, in the Lithuanian Civil War against Vytautas's cousin, Jogaila.
- April 14 – John VII Palaiologos overthrows his grandfather, John V Palaiologos, as Byzantine Emperor.
- April 19 – Robert III succeeds his father, Robert II, as King of Scotland.
- May 26 – Lithuanian Civil War: The Treaty of Königsberg is signed in Königsberg, between Samogitian nobles and representatives of the Teutonic Knights.
- September 11 – Lithuanian Civil War: The coalition of Vytautas and the Teutonic Knights begins a 5-week siege of Vilnius. The Duke of Hereford (the future King Henry IV of England) is among the western European knights serving with the coalition.
- September 17 – John VII Palaiologos seeks refuge with the Ottoman sultan Bayezid I, after John V Palaiologos is restored by his son, Manuel, and the Republic of Venice.
- October 9 – Henry III succeeds his father, John I, as King of Castile and León.

==== Date unknown ====
- Fall of Philadelphia
  - The Ottomans take Philadelphia, the last Byzantine enclave of any significance in Anatolia.
- Barquq is restored as Mamluk Sultan of Egypt, after overthrowing Sultan Hadji II.
- Nasir ud din Muhammad Shah III overthrows his brother, Abu Bakr Shah, as Sultan of Delhi.
- Manuel III succeeds his father, Alexios III, as Emperor of Trebizond (now north eastern Turkey).
- Sikandar But-shikan succeeds Sikandar Shah, as Sultan of Kashmir.
- Ko Cheng succeeds Che Bong Nga, as King of Champa (now eastern Vietnam).
- Mahmud succeeds Sandaki as Mansa of the Mali Empire, restoring the Keita dynasty.
- N'Diklam Sare succeeds Sare N'Dyaye, as ruler of the Jolof Empire (now part of Senegal).
- The Kingdom of Kaffa is established in present day Ethiopia (approximate date).
- Templo Mayor, the main temple of the Aztec capital of Tenochtitlan (now Mexico City), is built.
- The Candi Surawana Temple is built in the Majapahit Kingdom (now Indonesia).
- Construction begins on San Petronio Basilica in Bologna.

=== 1391 ===
==== January–December ====
- June 6 – Massacre of 1391: Anti-Jewish pogroms erupt in Seville, Spain. Many thousands of Jews are massacred, and the violence spreads throughout Spain and Portugal, especially to Toledo, Barcelona and Mallorca. This event marks a turning-point in the history of the Spanish Jews, with most of the survivors leaving the Iberian Peninsula or being forced to convert.
- July 18 – Tokhtamysh–Timur war – Battle of the Kondurcha River: Timur defeats Tokhtamysh of the Golden Horde, in present day southeast Russia.

==== Date unknown ====
- Manuel II Palaiologos becomes Byzantine emperor after his father, John V Palaiologos, dies of a nervous breakdown, due to his continued humiliation by the Ottoman Empire.
- Yusuf II succeeds Muhammed V, as Nasrid Sultan of Granada (now southern Spain).
- Stephen Dabiša succeeds Stephen Tvrtko I, as King of Bosnia.
- Shah Mansur becomes leader of the Timurid-occupied Muzaffarid Empire, in central Persia.
- A group of Muzaffarids under Zafar Khan Muzaffar establish a new Sultanate at Gujarat, in western India.
- Vytautas the Great, claimant to the throne of Lithuania, forms an alliance with Muscovy.
- Roman I succeeds Petru, as Prince of Moldavia (now Moldova and northeastern Romania).
- Konrad von Wallenrode succeeds Konrad Zöllner von Rotenstein, as Grand Master of the Teutonic Knights.
- Bridget of Sweden is canonized by Pope Boniface IX.
- Ushkuinik pirates from Novgorod sack the Muscovy towns of Zhukotin and Kazan.
- The Chinese invent toilet paper for use by their emperors.
- Henry I Sinclair, Earl of Orkney, takes control of the Shetland Islands and the Faroe Islands.
- The University of Ferrara is founded on the Italian Peninsula.
- The Ming government orders 50 million trees planted in the Nanjing area.

=== 1392 ===
==== January–December ====
- June 13 – An assassination attempt by Pierre de Craon against Olivier de Clisson, Constable of France, fails.
- August 5
  - General Yi Sŏng-gye crowns himself Taejo of Joseon, ending the Goryeo dynasty in the Korean Peninsula, and establishing the Joseon dynasty, which will last for more than 500 years.
  - Charles VI of France (later known as "Charles the Mad") suffers a serious bout of psychosis, which will continue throughout his life.
- December 16 – Emperor Go-Kameyama of Japan abdicates in favor of rival claimant Go-Komatsu, in order to end the nanboku-cho period of conflict between the Northern and Southern imperial courts.

==== Date unknown ====
- King Jogaila of Poland and Lithuania appoints his cousin Vytautas the Great as regent of Lithuania, in return for Vytautas giving up his claim to the Lithuanian throne. Vytautas replaces Jogaila's unpopular brother Skirgaila as regent.
- Muhammed VII succeeds Yusuf II, as Nasrid Sultan of Granada (modern-day southern Spain).
- Franciscan friar James of Jülich is boiled alive, for impersonating a bishop and ordaining his own priests.
- Maria, Queen of Sicily defeats an army of rebel barons.
- William le Scrope succeeds William II de Montacute, as King of Mann.
- Seoan mac Pilib succeeds Tomas mor mac Mathghamhna as King of East Breifne, in north-central Ireland.
- The city of Afyonkarahisar (in modern-day western Turkey) is conquered by Sultan Beyazid I, of the Ottoman Empire.
- Louis de Valois is created first Duke of Orléans of the second creation.
- Erfurt University is founded in Erfurt, central Germany.
- Penistone Grammar School, later to be one of the first community comprehensive schools in England, is founded near Barnsley, England.

=== 1393 ===
- January 28 – Bal des Ardents: Four members of the court of Charles VI of France die in a fire, at a masquerade ball.
- March 23 – Bohemian priest John of Nepomuk is killed in Prague by being thrown off Charles Bridge into the Vltava river, allegedly at the behest of king Wenceslaus IV of Bohemia. Nepomuk later will be declared a saint.
- March 29 - In central Persia, the Muzzafarid Empire, led by Shah Mansur, rebels against their Timurid occupiers. The rebellion is squashed and the Shah is executed along with the whole Muzaffarid nobility, ending the Muzaffarid dynasty in Persia.
- November 30 - Konrad von Jungingen succeeds Konrad von Wallenrode, as Grand Master of the Teutonic Knights.

==== Date unknown ====
- George VII succeeds his popular father, Bagrat V, as King of Georgia.
- Abdul Aziz II becomes Sultan of the Marinid dynasty in present-day Morocco, after the death of Sultan Abu Al-Abbas.
- Raimondo Del Balzo Orsini succeeds Otto, Duke of Brunswick-Grubenhagen, as Prince of Taranto (now southeastern Italy).
- Samsenethai succeeds his father, Fa Ngum, as King of Lan Xang (now Laos).
- King James I of Cyprus inherits the title of King of Armenia, after the death of his distant cousin Leo VI (although the Mamluk conquerors from Egypt remain the true rulers).
- A Ming dynasty Chinese record states that 720,000 sheets of toilet paper (two by three ft. in size) alone have been produced for the various members of the imperial court at Beijing, while the Imperial Bureau of Supplies also reports that 15,000 sheets of toilet paper alone have been designated for the royal family (made of fine soft yellow tissue and perfumed).
- Bosnia resists an invasion by the Ottoman Empire.
- The Ottoman Turks capture Turnovgrad (now Veliko Tarnovo), the capital city of east Bulgaria. Emperor Ivan Shishman is allowed to remain as puppet ruler of east Bulgaria.
- Despite his treaty with the king of Poland, Roman I of Moldavia supports Fyodor Koriatovych against the king. Losing the battle, he will also lose the throne of Moldavia the next year.
- Sikander Shah I succeeds Muhammad Shah III, as Sultan of Delhi. Sikander Shah I is succeeded two months later by Mahmud II.
- Abu Thabid II succeeds Abu Tashufin II, as ruler of the Abdalwadid dynasty in present-day eastern Algeria. Abu Thabid is succeeded in the same year by his brother, Abul Hadjdjadj I.
- Maelruanaidh MacDermot succeeds Aedh MacDermot, as King of Magh Luirg in north-central Ireland.
- King Stjepan Dabiša of Bosnia signs the Contract of Djakovice, establishing peace with King Sigismund of Hungary.
- Byzantium loses Thessaly to the growing Ottoman Empire.
- In her aim to form The Kalmar Union, Queen Margaret I of Denmark is laying siege to Stockholm, which is controlled by troops loyal to the former Swedish king Albert of Mecklenburg.

=== 1394 ===
==== January–December ====
- February 28 – Richard II of England grants Geoffrey Chaucer 20 pounds a year for life, for his services as a diplomat and Clerk of The King's Works.
- June 11 – The Venetians take over possession of Argos, from Despot Theodore I Palaiologos.
- September 17 – King Charles VI of France orders the expulsion of all Jews from France.
- September 28 – Antipope Benedict XIII is elected to succeed Antipope Clement VII.
- October 10 – Battle of Karanovasa: Wallachia (now southern Romania) resists an invasion by the Ottomans, and their Serb and Bulgarian vassals.
- November 29 – The capital city of the Joseon dynasty (in present-day Korea) is moved from Gaegyeong (now Gaeseong) to Hanseong (now Seoul).
- December 6 – The astronomical clock of St. Nicholas Church in Stralsund is finished and signed by Nikolaus Lilienfeld.

==== Date unknown ====
- The Ottomans conquer Thessaly (now eastern Greece) and begin an eight-year siege of Constantinople, in the Byzantine Empire. In the same year, they begin building the Anadoluhisarı fortress to defend themselves during the siege.
- Ashikaga Yoshimitsu retires as shōgun of Japan, and is succeeded by his son, Ashikaga Yoshimochi.
- Gyeongbokgung Palace and the Jongmyo royal ancestral shrine are built in Hanseong (now Seoul).
- After the death of Sultan Mahmud II, civil war breaks out in the Delhi Sultanate, splitting the state between east and west.
- Battle of Ros-Mhic-Thriúin: The Kingdom of Leinster, led by King Art mac Art MacMurrough-Kavanagh, defeats an invading army from England, led by King Richard II of England and Roger Mortimer, 4th Earl of March.
- Ştefan I succeeds Roman I, as Prince of Moldavia (now Moldova and eastern Romania).
- Abu Zayyan II succeeds his brother, Abul Hadjdjadj I, as ruler of the Abdalwadid dynasty in present-day eastern Algeria.
- Abd al-Aziz II succeeds Abu al-Abbas Ahmad II, as ruler of the Hafsid dynasty in present-day Tunisia.
- The Allgäuer Brauhaus brewery is founded in present-day Germany.
- The Hongwu Emperor of the Ming dynasty in China orders the Ministry of Public Works to issue a public notice, that every 100 households in the lijia system are to set aside 2 mu (1,390 m^{2}) of land, for planting mulberry and jujube trees.

=== 1395 ===
==== January–December ====
- February 12 – The army led by Sigismund of Luxembourg is ambushed by Stephen I of Moldavia, on its way back after conquering Neamț Citadel, and the Hungarians must retreat empty handed.
- April 15 – Tokhtamysh–Timur war – Battle of the Terek River: Timur defeats Tokhtamysh of the Golden Horde at the Volga. The Golden Horde capital city, Sarai, is razed to the ground, and Timur installs a puppet ruler on the Golden Horde throne. Tokhtamysh escapes to Lithuania.
- May 1 – The Duchy of Milan is created, after Lord Gian Galeazzo Visconti of Milan buys the title of Duke from Wenceslaus, King of the Romans.
- May 17
  - Battle of Rovine: With the help of the Hungarians, Wallachia resists an invasion by the Ottomans and their Serb and Bulgarian vassals. But Mircea I of Wallachia has to temporarily flee to Transylvania, and Vlad I Uzurpatorul is placed on the throne by the Ottomans.
  - Mary of Hungary dies, ending of the reign of Hungary by the Capet-Anjou family. Her co-reigning estranged husband, King Sigismund, becomes sole ruler of Hungary.
- June 3 – Sultan Bayezid I of the Ottoman Empire beheads Emperor Ivan Shishman of Ottoman-occupied eastern Bulgaria, after Shishman is accused of collaborating with the Wallachians during the 1394 Battle of Karanovasa.
- August 29 – Albert IV succeeds his father, Albert III, as Duke of Austria.
- September 8 – The death of King Stjepan Dabiša leads to the election of his wife Jelena Gruba as Queen of Bosnia. However, most of the Bosnian land is soon appropriated by King Sigismund of Hungary.

==== Date unknown ====
- Ramaracha succeeds Ramesuan as ruler of the Ayutthaya Kingdom in present-day southern Thailand.
- The Gwanghwamun Gate and the Jogyesa Temple are built in present-day Seoul.
- The Theotokos of Vladimir icon is moved to Moscow.
- John Rykener, also known as Johannes Richer and Eleanor, a transvestite prostitute working mainly in London (near Cheapside), but also active in Oxford, is arrested for cross-dressing and interrogated. The records have survived, the only surviving legal records from this age which mention same-sex intercourse.

=== 1396 ===
==== January–December ====
- May 19 – Martin I succeeds his brother, John I, as King of Aragon (modern-day northeastern Spain).
- July 20 – Queen Margaret I of Denmark, Norway and Sweden publishes the Treaty of Kalmar, proposing the personal union of the three kingdoms of Denmark, Norway (with Iceland, Greenland, the Faroe Islands, Shetland and Orkney) and Sweden (including Finland and Åland).
- July 23 – Queen Margaret makes her great-nephew and adopted son Eric of Pomerania joint ruler of Sweden. Eric has already been made joint ruler of Norway.
- September – Battle of the North Inch ("Battle of the Thirty"): In a mass trial by combat on the North Inch of Perth, Scotland, the Clan Cameron defeat the Clan Mackintosh.
- September 19 – Duke of Brittany John V marries Joan of France.
- September 25 – Battle of Nicopolis: The Ottomans defeat a joint crusade by Hungary, France, the Holy Roman Empire, and Wallachia, led by King Sigismund of Hungary. This is the last large-scale crusade of the Middle Ages.
- October – A Transylvanian expedition captures Vlad I Uzurpatorul, thus allowing the restoration of Mircea I of Wallachia to the throne.
- October 31 – The widowed Richard II of England (29), and six-year-old Isabella of Valois (daughter of Charles VI of France), are married in Calais, resulting in a temporary peace between the kingdoms of England and France.
- November 24 – The Transit of Venus, the last not to be part of a pair, is possibly observed by Aztec astronomers.
- November 29 – Ralph Neville, 1st Earl of Westmorland, marries Joan Beaufort in England.

==== Date unknown ====
- The Ottomans capture the Bulgarian fortress of Vidin and Tsar Ivan Sratsimir, ending the Second Bulgarian Empire. The Bulgarian state is reestablished in 1878 as the Principality of Bulgaria.
- France conquers the Republic of Genoa.
- After a 14-year interregnum, Pedro de San Superano is declared ruler of the Principality of Achaea (modern-day Peloponnese, southern Greece).
- Abu Amir succeeds Abdul Aziz II as ruler of the Marinid dynasty, in modern-day Morocco.
- Timur appoints his son Miran Shah, as Timurid viceroy of present-day Azerbaijan.
- The Kart dynasty is brought to an end in east Persia after its remaining rulers are murdered at a banquet by Miran Shah.
- Philibert de Naillac succeeds Juan Fernández de Heredia, as Grand Master of the Knights Hospitaller.
- Huitzilihuitl succeeds his father, Acamapichtli, as ruler of the Aztecs.
- The Ulu Camii Mosque is built in Bursa by the Ottomans.
- The Ming dynasty court of China sends two envoys, Qian Guxun and Li Sicong, to the Ava Kingdom of Burma and the Tai polity of the Mong Mao, in order to resolve a dispute between these two. The travels of the Chinese ambassadors are recorded in the historical text of the Baiyi Zhuan.
- Timur orders the construction of a garden in a meadow, House of Flowers.
- Peasants in the modern-day provinces of Hunan and Hubei in the east of China plant 84 million fruit trees.
- The University of Zadar is founded, the first university in Croatia.

=== 1397 ===
==== January–December ====
- January – Mircea I takes back the throne of Wallachia.
- February 10 – John Beaufort becomes Earl of Somerset in England.
- June 6 – Richard Whittington is nominated as Lord Mayor of London for the first time.
- June 17 – Eric of Pomerania is crowned in Kalmar (Sweden) as ruler of the Kalmar Union, a personal union of the three kingdoms of Denmark, Norway (with Iceland, Greenland, the Faroe Islands, Shetland and Orkney) and Sweden (including Finland and Åland) engineered by Queen Margaret I of Denmark, his great-aunt and adoptive mother, who retains de facto power in the realm.
- July 12 – Richard II of England attempts to reassert authority over his kingdom by arresting members of a group of powerful barons known as the Lords Appellant.
- September 25 – The Treaty of Kalmar is signed.
- September 29
  - John Holland, Earl of Huntingdon is created Duke of Exeter, by his half-brother King Richard II of England.
  - Thomas Holland, 3rd Earl of Kent, John's brother, is created Duke of Surrey by King Richard.
- November 8 – Thomas Arundel, accused of high treason by King Richard II of England, is replaced by Roger Walden as Archbishop of Canterbury.

==== Date unknown ====
- The Ottomans capture the town of Vidin, the capital of the Tsardom of Vidin, the only remaining independent Bulgarian state. Emperor Ivan Sratsimir of Vidin is taken prisoner by early this year and later disappears while his son Constantine II becomes Emperor in his place.
- Temür Qutlugh is crowned as the Khan of Golden Horde with the help of general Edigu, although Edigu continues to hold the real power.
- The Università, a form of local government, is established in Malta.
- The Kirillo-Belozersky Monastery is founded in northwestern Russia.
- The Sretensky Monastery is founded in Moscow.
- The first hospital in al-Andalus is created, at Granada.
- Neuhausergasse 4, the brewer of Spaten, is listed on the register of Munich breweries.
- Gregory of Tatev writes the Book of Questions, a ten-volume encyclopedic work, at the Tatev Monastery, in Armenia.

=== 1398 ===
==== January–December ====
- March 15 – Trần Thuận Tông is forced to abdicate as ruler of the Trần dynasty in modern-day Vietnam, in favour of his three-year-old son Trần Thiếu Đế.
- April–May – The Bosnian nobility dethrone Queen Helen and replace her with Stephen Ostoja.
- June 25 – Jianwen succeeds his grandfather, Hongwu, as Emperor of Ming dynasty China.
- July – The Stecknitz Canal is completed between the rivers Elbe and Trave (at Lübeck) in modern-day north Germany, one of the earliest navigable summit level canals in the world.
- September
  - King Richard II of England exiles his cousin Henry Bolingbroke (the future Henry IV of England) for 10 years, in order to end Henry's feud with Thomas de Mowbray, 1st Duke of Norfolk, who is also exiled.
  - As France withdraws its support for Antipope Benedict XIII, an army led by Geoffrey Boucicaut occupies Avignon, and starts a five-year siege of the papal palace.
- October 12 – The Treaty of Salynas is signed by Vytautas, Grand Duke of Lithuania, and Konrad von Jungingen, Grand Master of the Teutonic Knights, in an attempt to cede Samogitia to the Knights.
- October 14 – King Taejo of Joseon abdicates the throne of the Joseon dynasty in modern-day Korea, following the murder of his heir Yi Bangsuk, during a coup by Yi's older half-brother, Yi Bang-won, in The First Strife Of Princes. Taejo's eldest son Jeongjong succeeds to the throne.
- November 11 – Janus succeeds his father, James I, as King of Cyprus and claimant to the throne of Armenian Cilicia.
- December 17 – Timur defeats the last ruler of the Delhi Sultanate, which has been weakened after four years of civil war. Following his victory, Timur's Islamic troops sack the city of Delhi, and proceed to massacre hundreds of thousands of the state's Hindu inhabitants.

==== Date unknown ====
- The Teutonic Knights recommence their raids of Lithuania.
- The Teutonic Knights conquer the island of Gotland, near Sweden, which has previously been run by the piratical Victual Brothers.
- Martin of Aragon launches a crusade against the Moors in North Africa.
- The Kingdom of Singapura falls, after being invaded by the Majapahit Empire.
- Abdullah succeeds Abu Amir as ruler of the Marinid dynasty in modern-day Morocco.
- Bunei succeeds his father, Satto, as King of Chūzan (modern-day central Okinawa, Japan).
- Glendalough monastery in Wicklow, Ireland is destroyed by English troops.
- Ferapontov Monastery is founded in modern-day northwest Russia by Therapont of Belozersk.
- The Munmyo Confucian shrine and Sungkyunkwan University are founded in modern-day Seoul.
- Mount Grace Priory is established in Yorkshire, England.
- According to fringe theorists, the Scottish explorer Henry I Sinclair, Earl of Orkney, reaches North America.

=== 1399 ===
==== January–December ====
- January – Timur the Lame captures and sacks Haridwar.
- February 3 – John of Gaunt, uncle of King Richard II of England and father of Henry Bolingbroke, dies.
- March 18 – Richard II of England cancels the legal documents allowing the exiled Henry Bolingbroke to inherit his father's lands.
- July 4 – While Richard II of England is away on a military campaign in Ireland, Henry Bolingbroke, with exiled former archbishop of Canterbury Thomas Arundel as an advisor, returns to England and begins a military campaign to reclaim his confiscated lands.
- August 6 – Prince of Yan (Zhu Di) of China starts a rebellion in Beijing.
- August 12 – Battle of the Vorskla River: Mongol Golden Horde forces, led by Khan Temür Qutlugh and Emir Edigu, annihilate a crusading army led by former Golden Horde Khan Tokhtamysh, and Grand Duke Vytautas of Lithuania.
- August 19 – Richard II of England is taken prisoner upon his return from Ireland.
- September 29 – Having regained his father's lands, Henry Bolingbroke is urged to take the crown from the unpopular Richard II of England. Parliament charges Richard II with committing crimes against his subjects and eventually forces him to abdicate.
- September 30 – Parliament accepts Henry Bolingbroke as the new king of England.
- October 13 – Henry IV of England is crowned.
- October 19 – Thomas Arundel is restored as Archbishop of Canterbury, replacing Roger Walden.
- November 1 – John V, Duke of Brittany begins his reign.

==== Date unknown ====
- Faraj succeeds his father, Barquq, as Mamluk Sultan of Egypt.
- Sultan Bayezid I of the Ottoman Empire invades Mamluk-occupied Syria. A rift forms between Sultan Bayezid and Timur of the Timurid Empire, who also wanted to conquer Syria.
- Ladislaus regains the throne of Naples, after overthrowing King Louis II.
- King Jogaila becomes sole ruler of Poland, after the death of his co-ruling wife, Queen Jadwiga.
- Abu Said Uthman III succeeds Abdullah, as ruler of the Marinid dynasty in present-day Morocco.
- The Principality of Achaea (now southern Greece) resists an invasion by the Ottoman Empire.
- Traditional foundation date of the Kingdom of Mysore in India, which survives until 1950.
- Iuga becomes prince of Moldavia

== Births ==
1390

- October 3 – Humphrey, Duke of Gloucester (d. 1447)
- December 27 – Anne de Mortimer, claimant to the English throne (d. 1411)
- date unknown
  - Moctezuma I, Aztec ruler of Tenochtitlan, son of Huitzilihuitl (d. 1469)
- probable
  - John Dunstaple, English composer (d. 1453)
  - Engelbrekt Engelbrektsson, Swedish statesman and rebel leader (d. 1436)
  - Contessina de' Bardi, politically active Florentine woman (d. 1473)
  - Jan van Eyck, Flemish painter (d. 1441)

1391

- June 24 – Joan of France, Duchess of Brittany (d. 1433)
- July 31 – Cyriacus of Ancona, Italian merchant, "father of archaeology" (d. 1453/5)
- October 31 – Edward, King of Portugal (d. 1438)
- November 6 – Edmund Mortimer, 5th Earl of March, English politician (d. 1425)
- Gedun Drub, 1st Dalai Lama (d. 1474)
- Thomas West, 2nd Baron West, English soldier (d. 1415)

1392

- January 10 – Johanna van Polanen, Dutch noblewoman (d. 1445)
- December 9 – Peter, Duke of Coimbra (d. 1449)
- December 18 – John VIII Palaiologos, penultimate Byzantine emperor (d. 1448)
- date unknown
  - Alain Chartier, French poet and political writer (approximate date; d. c. 1430)
  - Flavio Biondo, Italian humanist and historian (d. 1463)
  - Barbara of Cilli, Holy Roman Empress, queen consort of Hungary and Bohemia (d. 1451)
  - John de Mowbray, 2nd Duke of Norfolk (d. 1432)
  - John II of Luxembourg, Count of Ligny, French nobleman (d. 1441)
  - Filippo Maria Visconti, Duke of Milan (d. 1447)
  - Idris Imad al-Din, supreme leader of Tayyibi Isma'ilism, scholar and historian (d. 1468)

1393

- February 3 – Henry Percy, 2nd Earl of Northumberland (d. 1455)
- August 24 – Arthur III, Duke of Brittany (d. 1458)
- December – Margaret of Burgundy, Dauphine of France (d. 1442)
- date unknown
  - John Capgrave, English theologian (d. 1464)
  - Giovanni Antonio Del Balzo Orsini, Prince of Taranto (d. 1463)
  - Anna of Moscow, Byzantine empress consort (d. 1417)
  - Osbern Bokenam, English Augustinian friar and poet
  - Thomas de Morley, 5th Baron Morley
  - Andrea Vendramin, Doge of Venice (d. 1478)
  - Alvise Loredan, Venetian admiral and statesman (d. 1466)

1394

- March 4 – Prince Henry the Navigator, Portuguese patron of exploration (d. 1460)
- June 4 – Philippa of England, Queen of Denmark, Norway and Sweden (d. 1430)
- July 12 – Ashikaga Yoshinori, Japanese shōgun (d. 1441)
- July 25 – James I of Scotland (d. 1437)
- November 24 – Charles, Duke of Orléans, French poet (d. 1465)
- date unknown
  - Ulugh Beg, Timurid ruler and astronomer (d. 1449)
  - Ikkyū, Japanese Zen Buddhist priest and poet (d. 1481)
  - Michael de la Pole, 3rd Earl of Suffolk (d. 1415)
- probable – Cymburgis of Masovia, Duchess of Austria

1395

- January 11 – Michele of Valois, French princess and Duchess Consort of Burgundy (d. 1422)
- March 18 – John Holland, 2nd Duke of Exeter, English military leader (d. 1447)
- September 7 – Reginald West, 6th Baron De La Warr, English politician (d. 1427)
- date unknown
  - Fra Angelico, Italian painter (d. 1455)
  - Niccolò Da Conti, Italian merchant and explorer (d. 1469)
  - George of Trebizond, Greek philosopher and scholar (d. 1484)
  - Jacques Cœur, French merchant (d. 1456)

1396

- July 31 – Philip III, Duke of Burgundy (d. 1467)
- October 16 – William de la Pole, 1st Duke of Suffolk, English noble (d. 1450)
- date unknown
  - Alfonso V of Aragon (d. 1458)
  - Bonne of Artois, countess regent of Nevers (d. 1425)
  - Ambroise de Loré, baron of Ivry in Normandy (d. 1446)
  - Michelozzo, Italian architect and sculptor (d. 1472)
  - Ponhea Yat, ruler of the Khmer Empire (d. 1460?)

1397

- February 21 – Infanta Isabel, Duchess of Burgundy (d. 1471)
- May 15 – Sejong the Great of Joseon, ruler of Korea (d. 1450)
- August 10 – Albert II of Germany, Holy Roman Emperor (d. 1439)
- November 15 – Pope Nicholas V (d. 1455)
- date unknown
  - Chimalpopoca, Aztec ruler of Tenochtitlán (d. 1427)
  - Tlacaelel, Aztec nobleman (d. 1487)
  - Paolo dal Pozzo Toscanelli, Italian mathematician (d. 1482)
  - John de Ros, 7th Baron Ros, English noble and soldier (d. 1421)
  - Paolo Uccello, Florentine painter (d. 1475)

1398

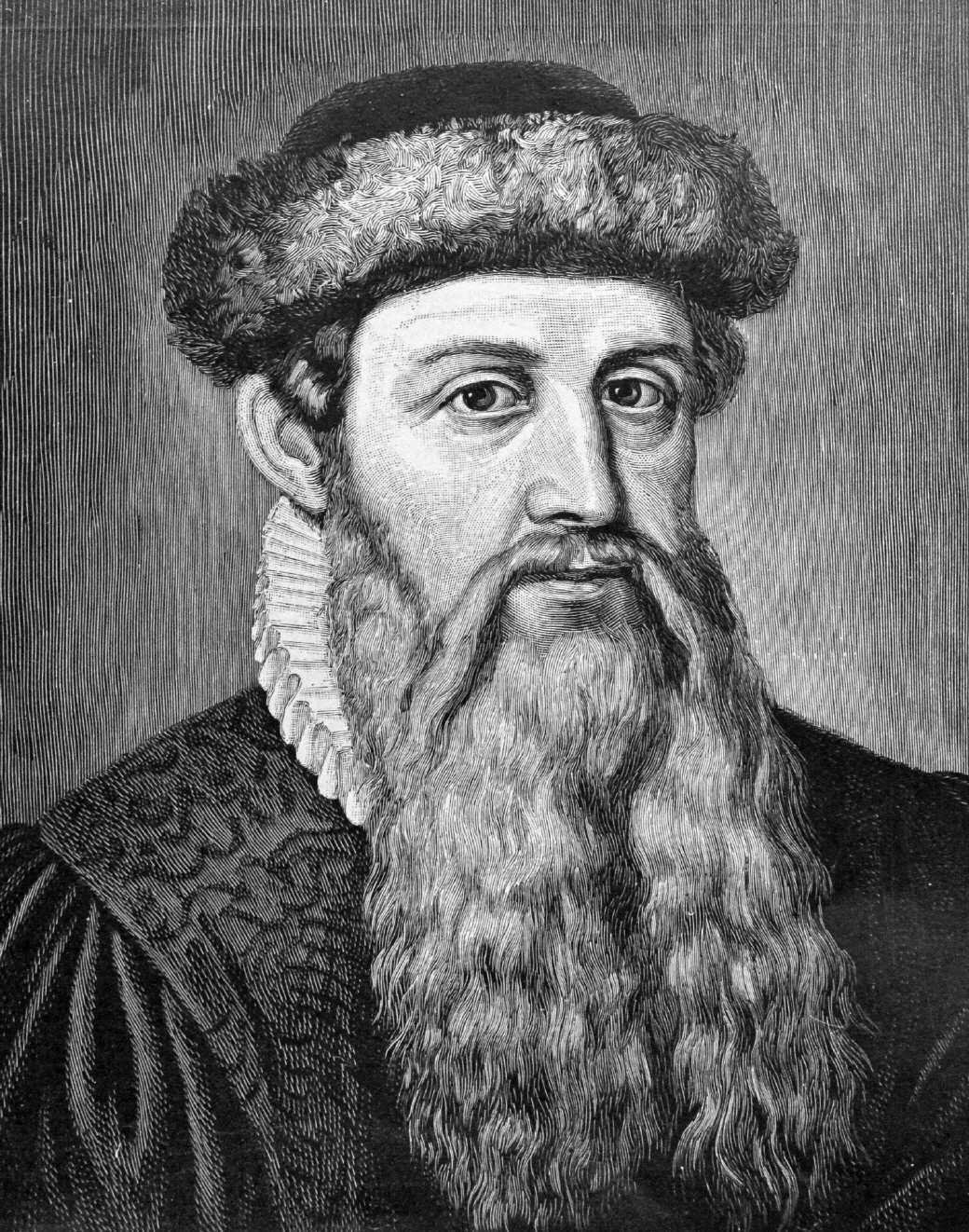
Johannes Gutenberg

- August 19 – Íñigo López de Mendoza, 1st Marquis of Santillana, Spanish poet (d. 1458)
- date unknown
  - Cecília Rozgonyi, Hungarian noble and heroine (d. 1434)
  - Spytko III of Melsztyn, Polish nobleman (d. 1439)
  - Moctezuma I, second Aztec emperor (d. 1469)
  - William Waynflete, English Lord Chancellor and bishop of Winchester (d. 1486)
  - Johannes Gutenberg, German inventor of the printing press
  - Tlacaélel, Aztec warrior, thinker, high priest and noble for the Mexica Empire (d. 1487)

1399

- March 16 – Xuande Emperor of China (d. 1435)
- June 26 – John, Count of Angoulême (d. 1467)
- date unknown
  - William II Canynges, English merchant (approximate date; d. 1474)
  - Zara Yaqob, Emperor of Ethiopia (d. 1468)
  - Rogier van der Weyden, Dutch painter (or 1400)

== Deaths ==
1390

- January 26 – Adolph IX, Count of Holstein-Kiel (b.c 1327)
- February 16 – Rupert I, Elector Palatine (b. 1309)
- March 20 – Alexios III Megas Komnenos, Emperor of Trebizond (b. 1338)
- April 19 – King Robert II of Scotland (b. 1316)
- July 8 – Albert of Saxony, Bishop of Halberstadt and German philosopher (b. c. 1320)
- August 14 – John FitzAlan, 2nd Baron Arundel, English soldier (b. 1364)
- September 23 – John I, Duke of Lorraine (b. 1346)
- October 9 – King John I of Castile (fall from a horse) (b. 1358)
- September – Towtiwil, Prince of Black Ruthenia
- date unknown
  - Sandaki Mari Djata, Mansa of the Mali Empire
  - Keratsa of Bulgaria, Byzantine empress consort
  - Sa'ad al-Din Masud ibn Umar ibn Abd Allah al-Taftazani, Ilkhanate polymath (b. 1322)
- probable – Altichiero, Italian painter (b. 1330)

1391

- January 16 – Emir Muhammed V of Granada (b. 1338)
- February 16 – John V Palaiologos, Byzantine emperor (b. 1332)
- March 10 – King Tvrtko I of Bosnia (b. 1338)
- November 1 – Amadeus VII, Count of Savoy (b. 1360)
- Gaston III, Count of Foix, co-prince of Andorra
- date unknown
  - Petru, Prince of Moldavia
  - Margaret, Countess of Mar (approximate date)

1392

- March 25 – Hosokawa Yoriyuki, Japanese samurai
- April 26 – Chŏng Mong-ju, Korean civil minister, diplomat and scholar (b. 1338)
- May 17 – Zhu Biao, crown prince of the Ming dynasty, China (b. 1355)
- November 22 – Robert de Vere, Duke of Ireland (b. 1362)
- December 23 – Isabella of Castile, Duchess of York (b. 1355)
- date unknown
  - Abbot Methodius of Peshnosha, Eastern Orthodox saint
  - Lalleshwari, Kashmiri poet and mystic (b. 1320)

1393

- March 7 – Bogislaw VI, Duke of Pomerania (b. c. 1350)
- March 23 – John of Nepomuk, saint
- March 29 - Shah Mansur, Ruler of the Muzaffarids
- June 6 – Emperor Go-En'yū of Japan, former Pretender to the throne (b. 1359)
- July 23 – Konrad von Wallenrode, Grand Master of the Teutonic Knights
- July 30 – Alberto d'Este, Lord of Ferrara and Modena (b. 1347)
- August 6 – John de Ros, 5th Baron de Ros (b. 1365)
- November 29 – King Leo V of Armenia (b. c. 1342)
- date unknown
  - Fa Ngum, founder of the Lao Kingdom of Lan Xang (b. 1316)
  - Valentina Visconti, Queen of Cyprus
  - King Bagrat V of Georgia
  - Abu'l-Abbas Ahmad al-Mustansir, Sultan of the Marinid dynasty in Morocco

1394

- June 25 – Dorothea of Montau, German hermitess (b. 1347)
- March 17 – Louis, Count of Enghien, Count of Conversano and Brienne
- March 24 – Constance of Castile, claimant to the throne of Castile
- June 4 – Mary de Bohun, English countess, married to Henry IV of England
- June 7 – Anne of Bohemia, queen of Richard II of England (plague) (b. 1366)
- August 27 – Emperor Chōkei of Japan (b. 1343)
- September 16 – Antipope Clement VII (b. 1342)
- December 28 – Maria Angelina Doukaina Palaiologina, basilissa of Epirus (b. 1350)
- date unknown
  - John Hawkwood, English mercenary (b. 1320)
  - Fazlallah Astarabadi, Persian founder of the mystical Hurufism sect (executed)
  - Sultan Mahmud II of the Delhi Sultanate
  - Former King Gongyang of Goryeo (b. 1345)

1395

- March 13 – John Barbour, Scottish poet
- May 17
  - Prince Marko, Serbian leader
  - Mary, Queen of Hungary, co-ruler
- June 3 – Ivan Shishman of Bulgaria, tsar (b. c.1350)
- August 29 – Duke Albert III of Austria (b. 1349)
- December 25 – Elisabeth, Countess of Neuchâtel, Swiss ruler
- date unknown
  - Acamapichtli, 1st tlatoani (monarch) of Tenochtitlan (modern Mexico City), 1375-1395 (b. c. 1355)
  - Margaret the Barefooted, Italian saint (b. 1325)

1396

- January 11 – Isidore Glabas, Metropolitan bishop of Thessalonica (b. 1341/2)
- May 19 – John I of Aragon (b. 1350)
- July 31 – William Courtenay, Archbishop of Canterbury
- September 15 – Queen Sindeok, politically active Korean queen (b. 1356)
- November 29 – Robert Ferrers, 3rd Baron Ferrers of Wemme (b. 1373)
- date unknown
  - John Beaumont, 4th Baron Beaumont, Constable of Dover Castle (b. 1361)
  - Frederick II, Marquess of Saluzzo
  - Saint Stephen of Perm (b. 1340)
  - She Xiang, Chinese tribute chieftain (b. 1361)

1397

- January 11 – Skirgaila, Grand Duke of Lithuania
- February 18 – Enguerrand VII, Lord of Coucy (b. 1340)
- March 14 – Henry VIII the Sparrow, Duke of Żagań–Głogów (b. c. 1357)
- April 25 – Thomas Holland, 2nd Earl of Kent (b. 1350)
- June 3 – William Montacute, 2nd Earl of Salisbury, English military leader (b. 1328)
- June 16 – Philip of Artois, Count of Eu, French soldier (b. 1358)
- July 15 – Catherine of Henneberg, German ruler (b. c. 1334)
- September 2 – Francesco Landini, Italian composer
- September 8 – Thomas of Woodstock, 1st Duke of Gloucester, son of King Edward III of England (b. 1355)
- September 15 – Adam Easton, English cardinal
- September 21 – Richard FitzAlan, 11th Earl of Arundel, English military leader (executed) (b. 1346)
- October 6 – Vuk Branković, Serbian lord (b. 1345)

1398

- January 6 – Rupert II, Elector Palatine (b. 1325)
- January 31 – Former Emperor Sukō of Japan (b. 1334)
- June 24 – Hongwu Emperor of China (b. 1328)
- July 20 – Roger Mortimer, 4th Earl of March, heir to the throne of England (b. 1374)
- July/August (uncertain) – Kadi Burhan al-Din, poet, kadi, and ruler of Sivas (b. 1345)
- September 9 – James I of Cyprus (b. 1334)
- October 5 – Blanche of Navarre, Queen of France (b. 1333)
- date unknown – Jeong Dojeon, Korean philosopher

1399

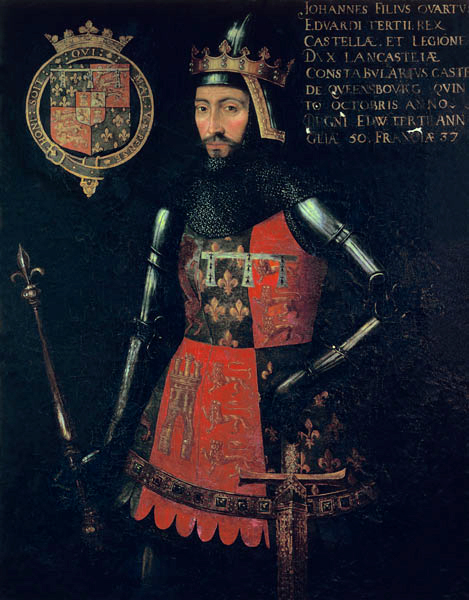
John of Gaunt died 3 February

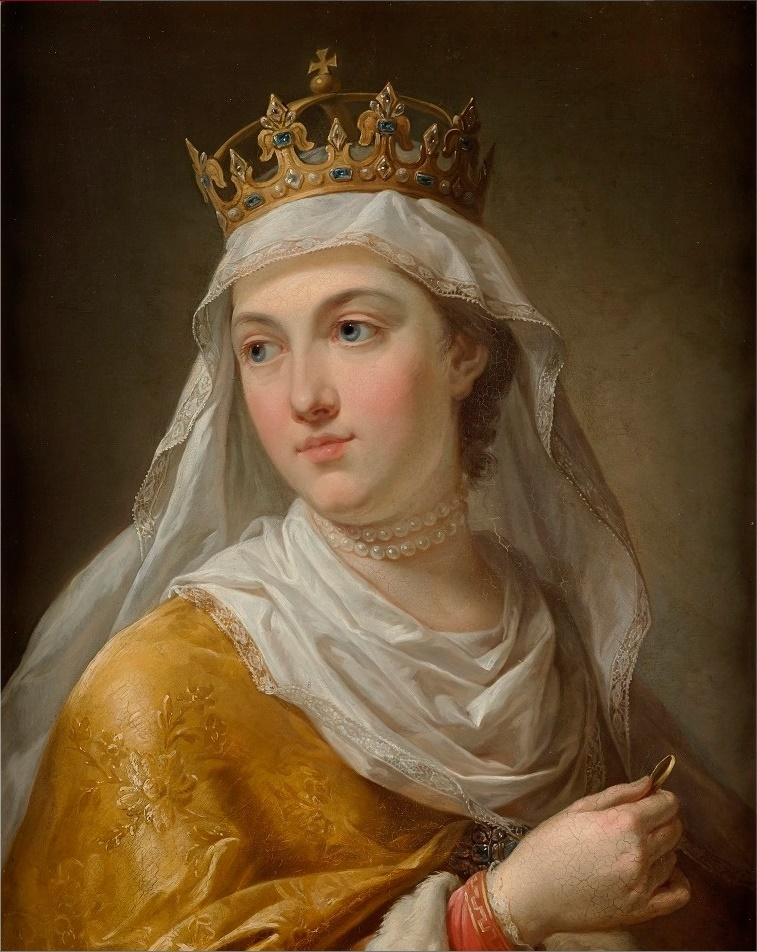
Jadwiga of Poland died 17 July

- January 4 – Nicholas Eymerich, Catalan theologian and inquisitor
- February 3 – John of Gaunt, 1st Duke of Lancaster (b. 1340)
- March 24 – Margaret, Duchess of Norfolk (b. c. 1320)
- July 13 – Peter Parler, German architect (b. 1330)
- July 17 – King Jadwiga of Poland (b. 1374)
- August 12 – Demetrius I Starshy, Prince of Trubczewsk (in battle) (b. 1327)
- August 15 – Ide Pedersdatter Falk, Danish noblewoman (b. 1358)
- August 26 – Mikhail II, Grand Prince of Tver (b. 1333)
- September 22 – Thomas de Mowbray, 1st Duke of Norfolk, English politician (b. 1366)
- October 3 – Eleanor de Bohun, English noble (b. c.1366)
- October 5 – Raymond of Capua, Italian Dominic friar and venerated Christian (b. 1330)
- November 1 – John IV, Duke of Brittany (b. 1339)
- date unknown
  - Spytek z Melsztyna, Polish nobleman
  - William le Scrope, 1st Earl of Wiltshire (b. 1350)
  - Sultan Barquq of Egypt
  - Trần Ngung, former ruler of Trần dynasty Vietnam (forced to commit suicide)
  - Stephen I of Moldavia
