= 1398 =

1398 in various calendars
- Gregorian calendar: 1398; MCCCXCVIII
- Ab urbe condita: 2151
- Armenian calendar: 847; ԹՎ ՊԽԷ
- Assyrian calendar: 6148
- Balinese saka calendar: 1319–1320
- Bengali calendar: 804–805
- Berber calendar: 2348
- English Regnal year: 21 Ric. 2 – 22 Ric. 2
- Buddhist calendar: 1942
- Burmese calendar: 760
- Byzantine calendar: 6906–6907
- Chinese calendar: 丁丑年 (Fire Ox); 4095 or 3888 — to — 戊寅年 (Earth Tiger); 4096 or 3889
- Coptic calendar: 1114–1115
- Discordian calendar: 2564
- Ethiopian calendar: 1390–1391
- Hebrew calendar: 5158–5159
- Hindu calendars
- Vikram Samvat: 1454–1455
- Shaka Samvat: 1319–1320
- Kali Yuga: 4498–4499
- Holocene calendar: 11398
- Igbo calendar: 398–399
- Iranian calendar: 776–777
- Islamic calendar: 800–801
- Japanese calendar: Ōei 5 (応永５年)
- Javanese calendar: 1312–1313
- Julian calendar: 1398; MCCCXCVIII
- Korean calendar: 3731
- Minguo calendar: 514 before ROC 民前514年
- Nanakshahi calendar: −70
- Thai solar calendar: 1940–1941
- Tibetan calendar: མེ་མོ་གླང་ལོ་ (female Fire-Ox); 1524 or 1143 or 371 — to — ས་ཕོ་སྟག་ལོ་ (male Earth-Tiger); 1525 or 1144 or 372

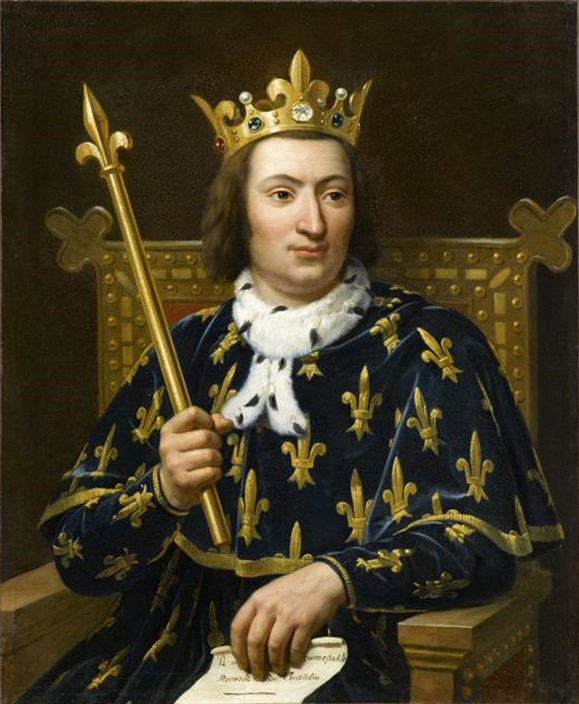
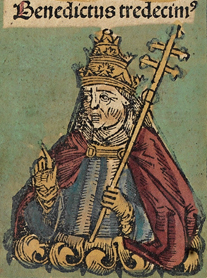
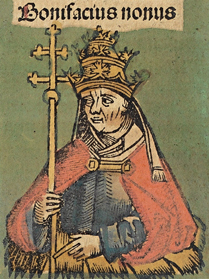
July 27: King Charles V of France withdraws obedience from both Avignon's Pope Benedict XIII and Rome's Pope Boniface IX, and orders attack on Avignon

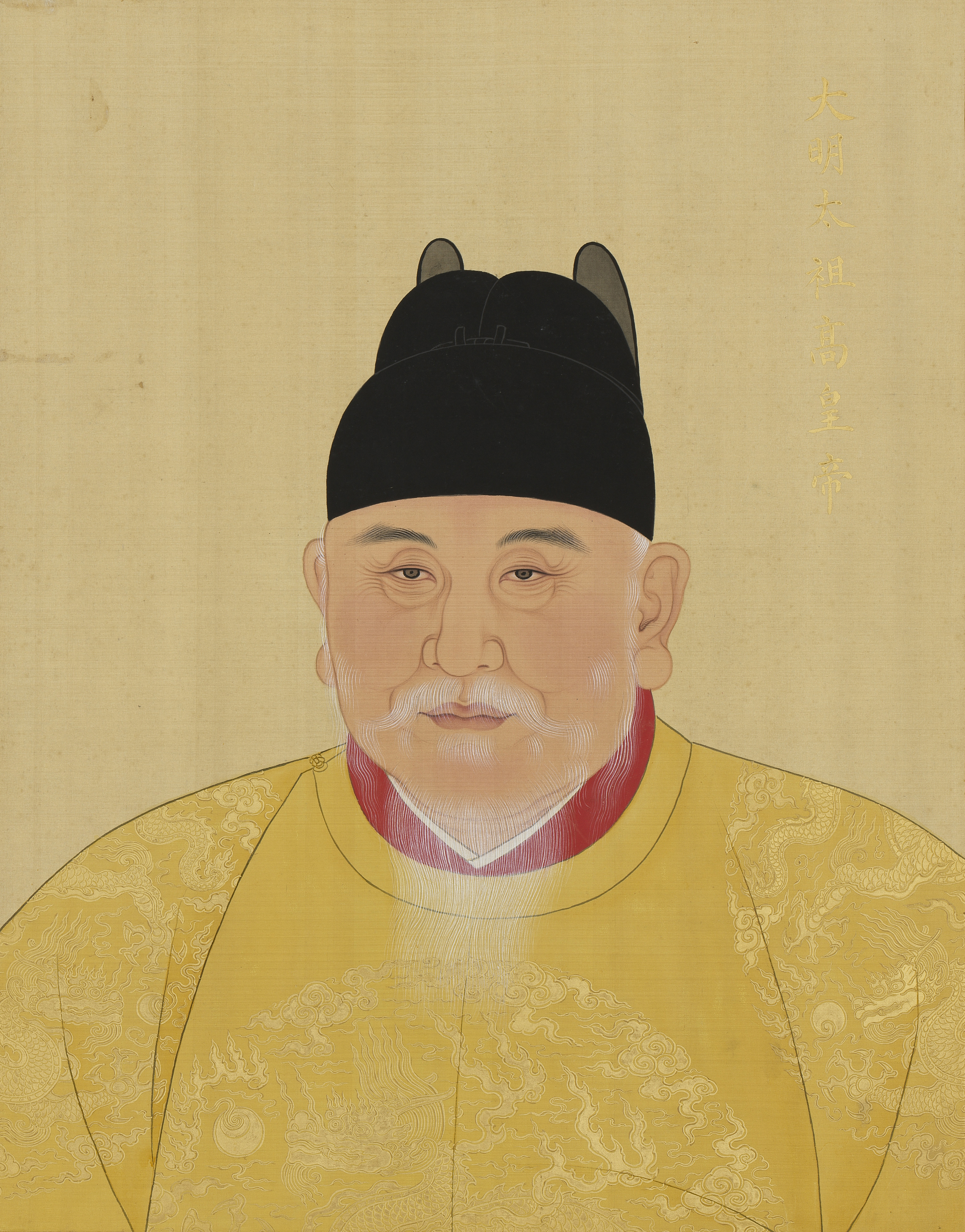
June 25: Zhu Yuanzhang, the Hongwu Emperor of Ming dynasty China, dies after a reign of 30 years.

Year 1398 (MCCCXCVIII) was a common year starting on Tuesday of the Julian calendar.

== Events ==
=== January–March ===
- January 6 – In Amberg, Ruprecht III "the Righteous" of the House of Wittelsbach becomes the new Elector of the Palatinate within the Holy Roman Empire upon the death of his father, Ruprecht II "the Hard".
- January 31 – The 24th English Parliament of King Richard II is dissolved after having met since September 17. The King gives royal assent to numerous laws, including the Treason Act 1397, providing for new definitions of treason (compassing the death of the King, making war against the King within the realm, attempting to repeal any judgments made by parliament convicting "certain traitors", or attempting to repeal the Treason Act itself.
- January – The Dao Ganmeng rebellion in the Chinese vassal state of Möng Mao,started in December by Dao Genmeng, is brought to an end in what is now Myanmar two months after Dao Ganmeng's takeover. With the intervention of the Chinese Empire, led by the Ming dynasty Emperor Zhu Yuanzhang, the deposed ruler Si Lunfa is restored to leadership.
- February 20 – The vicar John de Aston of Colston Bassett is released from incarceration at Fleet Prison in England by order of King Richard II upon the payment of mainprise or bail.
- March 15 – Trần Thuận Tông is forced to abdicate as ruler of the Trần dynasty in modern-day Vietnam, in favour of his three-year-old son Trần Thiếu Đế.
- March 17 – The Teutonic Knights resume their attack on Lithuania as a fleet of 84 ships, 4,000 men and 400 horses departs from Danzig toward Gotland, and arrive on March 21.
- March 19 – Abu Said Uthman III succeeds his older brother Abdallah ibn Ahmad II as the ruler of the Marinid dynasty in modern-day Morocco, reigning until his death in 1420.

=== April–June ===
- April 5 – The Teutonic Knights conquer the island of Gotland, near Sweden, which has previously been run by the piratical Victual Brothers. In the agreement of surrender, the city of Visby and the entire island are ceded to Johan of Mecklenburg, and merchants from the Hanseatic League are allowed free trade. In addition, the Knights receive the opportunity to clear all known pirates and other enemies from Gotland.
- May 10 – Stephen Ostoja is enthroned as the new King of Bosnia after Queen Helen is deposed.
- May 11 – The Treaty of Pavia is signed between the Republic of Florence and the Duchy of Milan to end the Mantuan War after 14 months.
- May 22 – The Assembly of Paris begins, as Catholic clergy and bishops discuss whether withdraw obedience from the rival popes, Boniface IX in Rome and the antipope Benedict XIII at Avignon withdrawing the right of either of the popes to bestow benefices to officials in France in return for past or future services.
- June 25 – Zhu Yunwen succeeds his grandfather, Zhu Yuanzhang, as Emperor Ming dynasty China, bringing an end to the Hongwu Era and beginning the Jianwen era.

=== July–September ===
- July 14 – In what is now central Turkey, Kadi Burhan al-Din, the vizier of and regent for the Sultanate of Eretnia, on a campaign to conquer the Emirate of Erzincan (eastern Turkey and western Armenia) and capture its Emir Mutahharten, is killed in battle by Qara Yuluk Uthman Beg.
- July 22 – The first ships to complete passage on the 60 miles (97 km) long Stecknitz Canal in Germany arrive at Lübeck, with 30 barges carrying salt from Lüneburg. The canal, completed after seven years between the rivers Elbe and Trave, is one of the earliest navigable summit level canals in the world.
- July 27 – Following the consensus of the Assembly of Paris of that had begun meeting on May 11, King Charles V of France signs an ordinance withdrawing obedience to both the French Avignon pope Benedict XIII and to Rome's Pope Boniface IX to issue benefices to persons who offer services to the Catholic Church. An army led by Geoffrey Boucicaut occupies Avignon, and starts a five-year siege of the papal palace.
- August 21 – King Martin of Aragon, and ruler of Valencia, Majorca and Barcelona, begins the Bona crusade of Christians against the Muslims of Tunisia and departs from the island of Menorca with 13 galleys, 77 warships and 7,500 crusaders toward the Harsid Kingdom, ruled by the Caliph Abu Faris Abd al-Aziz II.
- September 2 – The Bona crusaders from Spain sack the Algerian village of Tedelis in the Kingdom of Tlemcen, killing around 1,000 people, before abandoning the African crusade and returning to defend the siege of Avignon at France.
- September 9 – Janus of the House of Poitiers-Lusignan becomes the new King of Cyprus upon the death of his father, King Jacques I, who had reigned since 1382.
- September 16 – King Richard II of England exiles his cousin Henry Bolingbroke (the future Henry IV of England) for 10 years, in order to end Henry's feud with Thomas de Mowbray, 1st Duke of Norfolk, who is also exiled.

=== October–December ===
- October 12 – The Treaty of Salynas is signed by Vytautas, Grand Duke of Lithuania, and Konrad von Jungingen, Grand Master of the Teutonic Knights, in an attempt to cede Samogitia to the Knights.
- October 14 – King Taejo of Joseon abdicates the throne of the Joseon dynasty in modern-day Korea, following the murder of his heir Yi Bangsuk, during a coup by Yi's older half-brother, Yi Bang-won, in The First Strife Of Princes. Taejo's eldest son Jeongjong succeeds to the throne.
- November 11 – Janus succeeds his father, James I, as King of Cyprus and claimant to the throne of Armenian Cilicia.
- December 17 – Timur defeats the last ruler of the Delhi Sultanate, which has been weakened after four years of civil war. Following his victory, Timur's Islamic troops sack the city of Delhi, and proceed to massacre hundreds of thousands of the state's Hindu inhabitants.

=== Date unknown ===
- The Kingdom of Singapura falls, after being invaded by the Majapahit Empire.
- Bunei succeeds his father, Satto, as King of Chūzan (modern-day central Okinawa, Japan).
- Glendalough monastery in Wicklow, Ireland is destroyed by English troops.
- Ferapontov Monastery is founded in modern-day northwest Russia by Therapont of Belozersk.
- The Munmyo Confucian shrine and Sungkyunkwan University are founded in modern-day Seoul.
- Mount Grace Priory is established in Yorkshire, England.
- According to fringe theorists, the Scottish explorer Henry I Sinclair, Earl of Orkney, reaches North America.

== Births ==
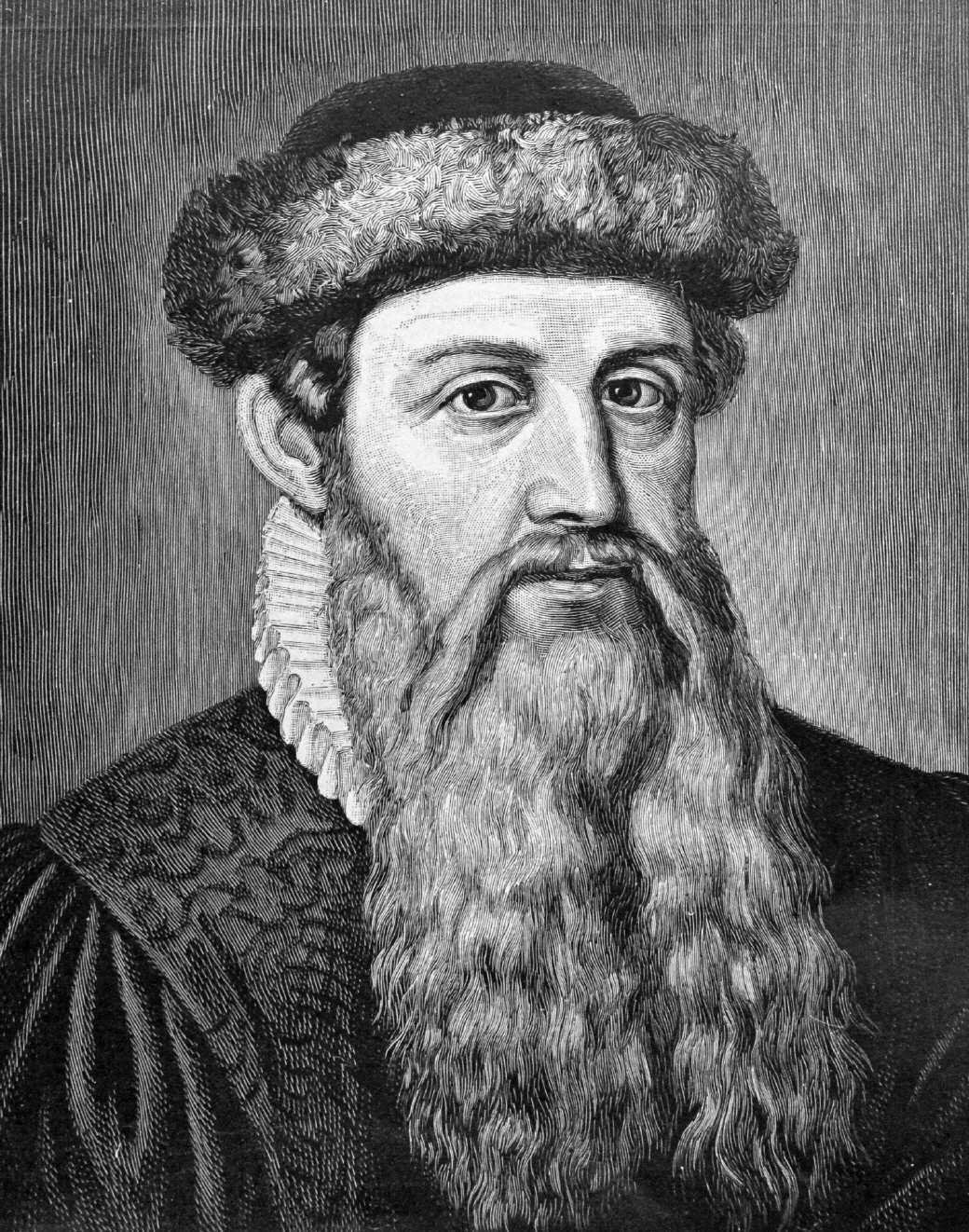
Johannes Gutenberg

- August 19 – Íñigo López de Mendoza, 1st Marquis of Santillana, Spanish poet (d. 1458)
- date unknown
  - Cecília Rozgonyi, Hungarian noble and heroine (d. 1434)
  - Spytko III of Melsztyn, Polish nobleman (d. 1439)
  - Moctezuma I, second Aztec emperor (d. 1469)
  - William Waynflete, English Lord Chancellor and bishop of Winchester (d. 1486)
  - Johannes Gutenberg, German inventor of the printing press
  - Tlacaélel, Aztec warrior, thinker, high priest and noble for the Mexica Empire (d. 1487)

== Deaths ==
- January 6 – Rupert II, Elector Palatine (b. 1325)
- January 31 – Former Emperor Sukō of Japan (b. 1334)
- June 24 – Hongwu Emperor of China (b. 1328)
- July 20 – Roger Mortimer, 4th Earl of March, heir to the throne of England (b. 1374)
- July/August (uncertain) – Kadi Burhan al-Din, poet, kadi, and ruler of Sivas (b. 1345)
- September 9 – James I of Cyprus (b. 1334)
- October 5 – Blanche of Navarre, Queen of France (b. 1333)
- date unknown – Chŏng Tojŏn, Korean philosopher
