= Barbary Crusade =

14th-century crusade

Mahdian Crusade
- Part of the Crusades
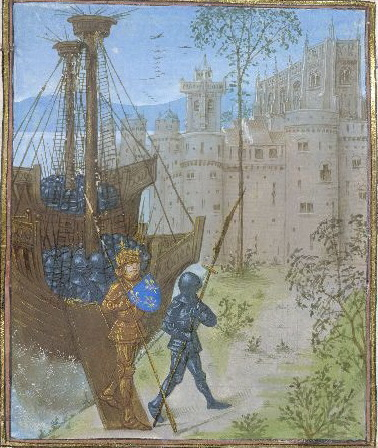
- The French army disembarking in Africa, led by the Duke of Bourbon, holding a shield bearing the royal arms of France (15th century miniature)
| Date | July 1 – October 1, 1390 |
| Location | Mahdia, Hafsid Ifriqiya (modern Tunisia) |
| Result | Hafsid-Zayyanid victory |
| Territorial changes | Status quo ante bellum |

Belligerents
| Kingdom of France; Republic of Genoa | Hafsids; Zayyanid Kingdom; Emirate of Béjaïa |

Commanders and leaders
| Louis II of Bourbon; Giacomo Fregoso | Ahmad II; Abu Tashufin II |

Strength
| 6,000 knights and soldiers 60 ships | 40,000 men |

Casualties and losses
| 274 | Unknown |

The Barbary Crusade, also called the Mahdia Crusade, was a Franco-Genoese military expedition in 1390 that led to the siege of Mahdia, then a stronghold of the Barbary pirates in Hafsidi Ifriqiya (geographically corresponding to modern Tunisia). Froissart's Chronicles is the chief account of what was one of the last crusades.

== Background ==
During the lulls of the Hundred Years' War, knights looked for opportunities for glory, honour, and payment. As Genoese ambassadors approached the French king Charles VI to subscribe to a crusade, they eagerly supported the plan to fight Muslim pirates from North Africa. These pirates had their main base at Mahdia on the Barbary coast. Genoa was ready to supply ships, supplies, 12,000 archers and 8,000 foot soldiers, if France would provide the knights. The proposal by the doge Antoniotto Adorno was presented as a crusade. As such it would give prestige to its participants, a moratorium on their debts, immunity from lawsuits, and papal indulgence. The French force also included some English participants and consisted of 1,500 knights under the leadership of Louis II, Duke of Bourbon. This crusade was endorsed by Pope Boniface IX of Rome (rather than by Antipope Clement VII of the Avignon Papacy). Boniface IX would later proclaim the Crusade of Nicopolis against the Ottoman Empire in 1396.

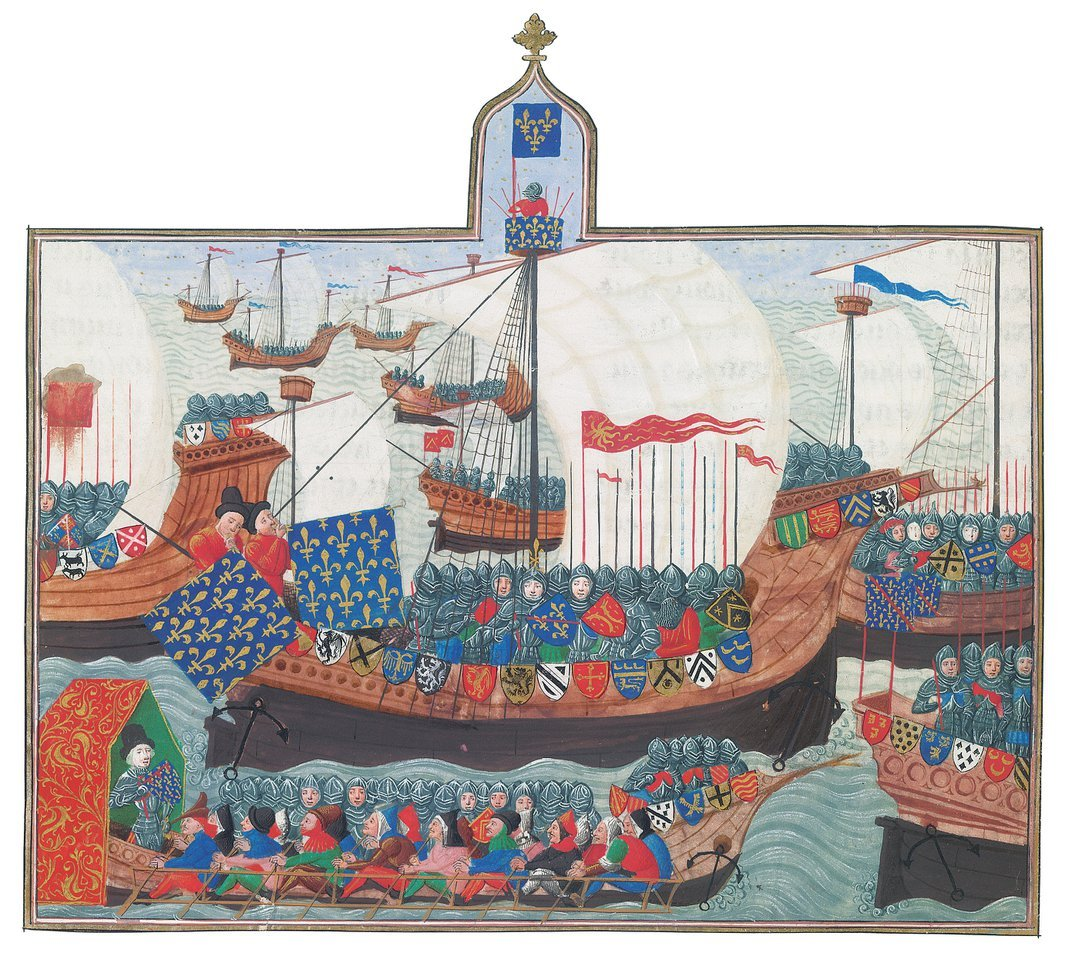
The Crusader Fleet of Louis of Bourbon on its way to Africa, Froissart's Chronicles

== Siege of Mahdia ==
A relief army reportedly 40,000 men strong was brought up by Hafsid Sultan Abu al-Abbas Ahmad II supported by the kings of Bejaia and Tlemcen who camped nearby, avoided pitched battle, but started to harass the crusaders. The Crusaders had to build a wall around their camp and fortify it. The Berbers sent out a negotiating party asking why the French would attack them, they had only troubled the Genoese, a natural affair among neighbors. In answer they were told that they were unbelievers who had "crucified and put to death the son of God called Jesus Christ." The Berbers laughed saying it was the Jews not they who had done that and broke off negotiations.

In a subsequent encounter with the large relief army the Crusaders were forced to retreat. The duration of the siege not only frustrated them, but their logistical systems started to weaken. When a final assault on the city was repelled they were ready to settle for a treaty. On the opposing side the Berbers realized that they could not overcome the heavier armed invaders. Both sides looked for a way to end the hostilities.

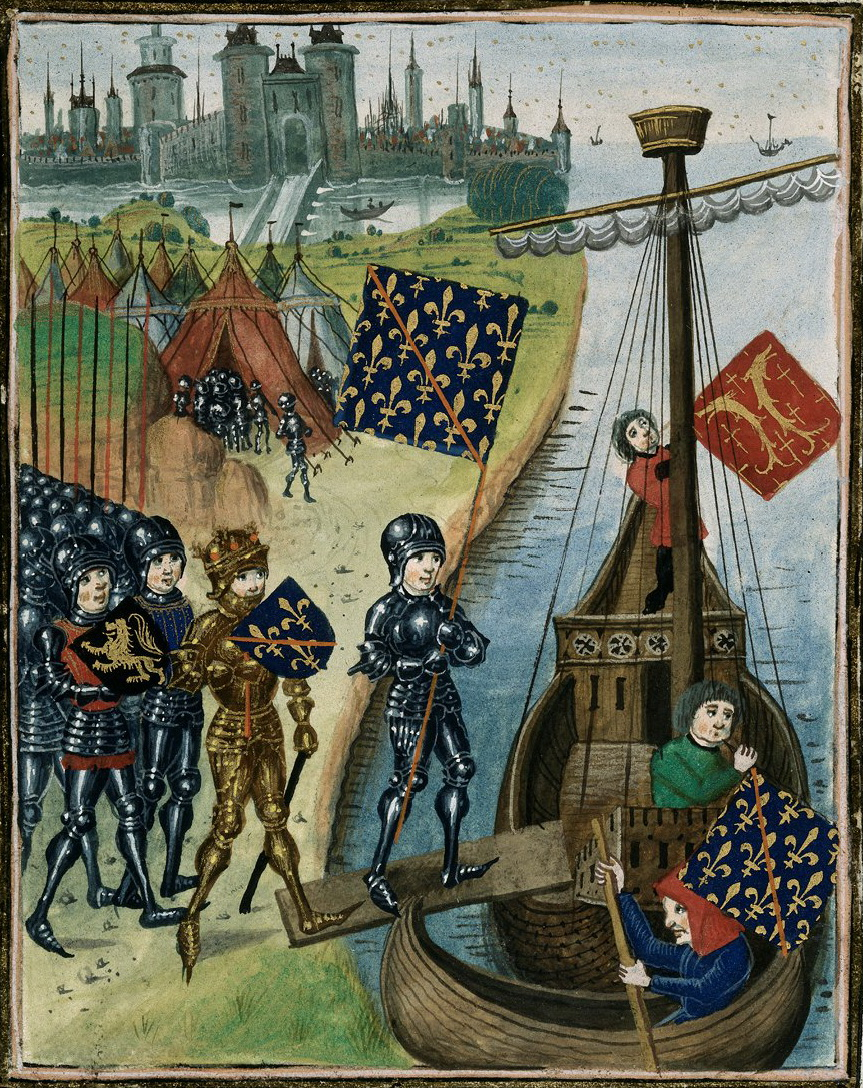
The Crusaders leaving Mahdia

== Lifting the siege ==
The siege was lifted with the conclusion of a treaty negotiated through the Genoese party. The treaty stipulated a ten-year armistice. By mid-October the Crusaders had returned to Genoa. Losses due to the fighting and disease amounted to 274 knights and squires.

== Aftermath ==
Both sides celebrated victory. The Berbers had repelled the invaders, and the Genoese could conduct trade with less interference. The French knights had no tangible goals but had participated for action and glory. They failed to learn any lessons from a "chivalric adventure with religious overlay". Their mistakes of unfamiliarity with the environment, lack of heavy siege equipment, underestimation of the enemy, and internal quarrels were repeated six years later on a grander scale in their fatal last crusade, at Nicopolis.

The Barbary Crusade of 1390 was endorsed by Pope Boniface IX, seated at Rome (rather than by the Avignon Papacy, at the time held by Antipope Clement VII). However, only a few years later, two subsequent Barbary Crusades would be led by Martin of Aragon, with the endorsement of the Avignon Papacy (held by Antipope Benedict XIII). These would occur in 1398 and 1399, against the Zayyanids and the Hafsids, respectively.

In 1396, Boniface IX would proclaim the Crusade of Nicopolis, attempting to halt the rising Ottoman Empire. Unlike the Barbary Crusade (which was a brief expedition), this was a large-scale and organised military effort, rallying forces from across Christendom against a single enemy. It failed; and along with the Crusade of Varna, the Crusade of Nicopolis is often seen as one of the last major Crusades, while the Barbary Crusade as seen as more typical of other later crusades (small-scale, localised, often without the goal of conquest).

== Notable participants ==
- Louis II, Duke of Bourbon
- Philip of Artois, Count of Eu
- Admiral Jean de Vienne
- Enguerrand VII, Lord of Coucy
- John of Nevers
- John Beaufort, 1st Earl of Somerset
- Geoffrey Boucicaut
- Jean d'Harcourt VII
- Henry Scrope, 3rd Baron Scrope of Masham
- Gadifer de la Salle
- Jean de Béthencourt
