= Tarikh e Khandan e Timuriyah =

Collection of Historical writings that details about the descendants of Timur

Tarikh-e Khandan-e Timuriyah
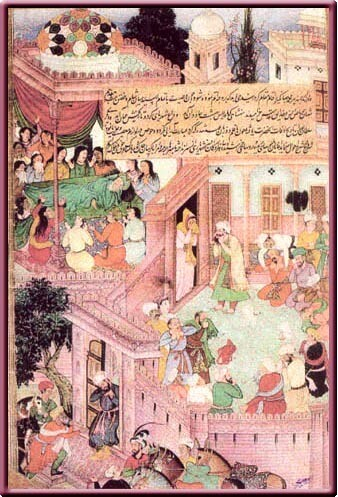
- A page from Tarikh-i-Khandan-i-Timuriyah This painting depicts the death of Timur, Hazrat-i-Sahib-i-Qiran
- Author: Akbar
- Language: Persian
- Subject: Historical record
- Genre: Historical Memoir
- Publication date: 16th century
- Publication place: Mughal Empire
- Media type: Book
- Pages: 338

Tarikh e Khandan e Timuriyah also known as "Chronicle of the Descendants of Timur" is a 16th-century manuscript commissioned by Mughal Emperor Akbar in 1577–1578. It describes the descendants of the 14th-century leader Timur in Iran and India This volume was crafted for the emperor's personal use, thus securing a place in his personal library. This volume, inscribed on the finest paper, boasts a collection of 133 paintings, collaboratively crafted by 51 prominent artists like Daswant, Miskin, Madho Mukund, Haidar Kashmiri, Miskeen, Manohar and Basawan. These intricately detailed and refined paintings have been described as exemplifying the pinnacle of Mughal artistic expression. The written text has calligraphy that matches the standards set by the artwork.

It was inducted by UNESCO into the Memory of the World register in 2011. The original manuscript is preserved in the Khuda Bakhsh Oriental Public library in Bihar, India.

It is the only extant copy of a manuscript that deals with the history of Timur and his descendants in Iran and India, including the Mughal rulers Babur, Humayun and Akbar.

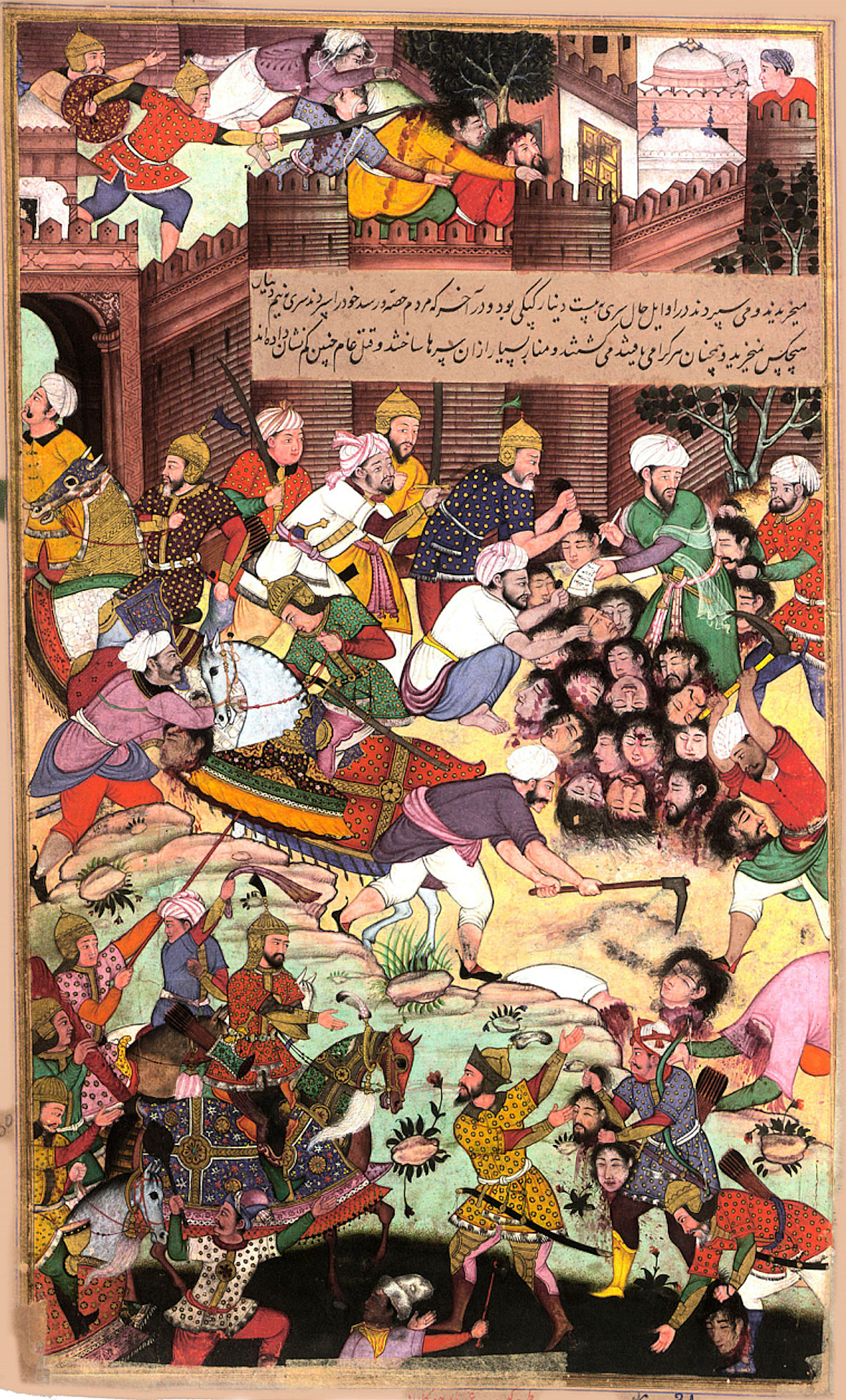
Timur’s troops bring the heads of the inhabitants of Isfahan to build a minaret of skulls in the Siege of Isfahan (1387). Tarikh-i Khandan-i Timuriyya

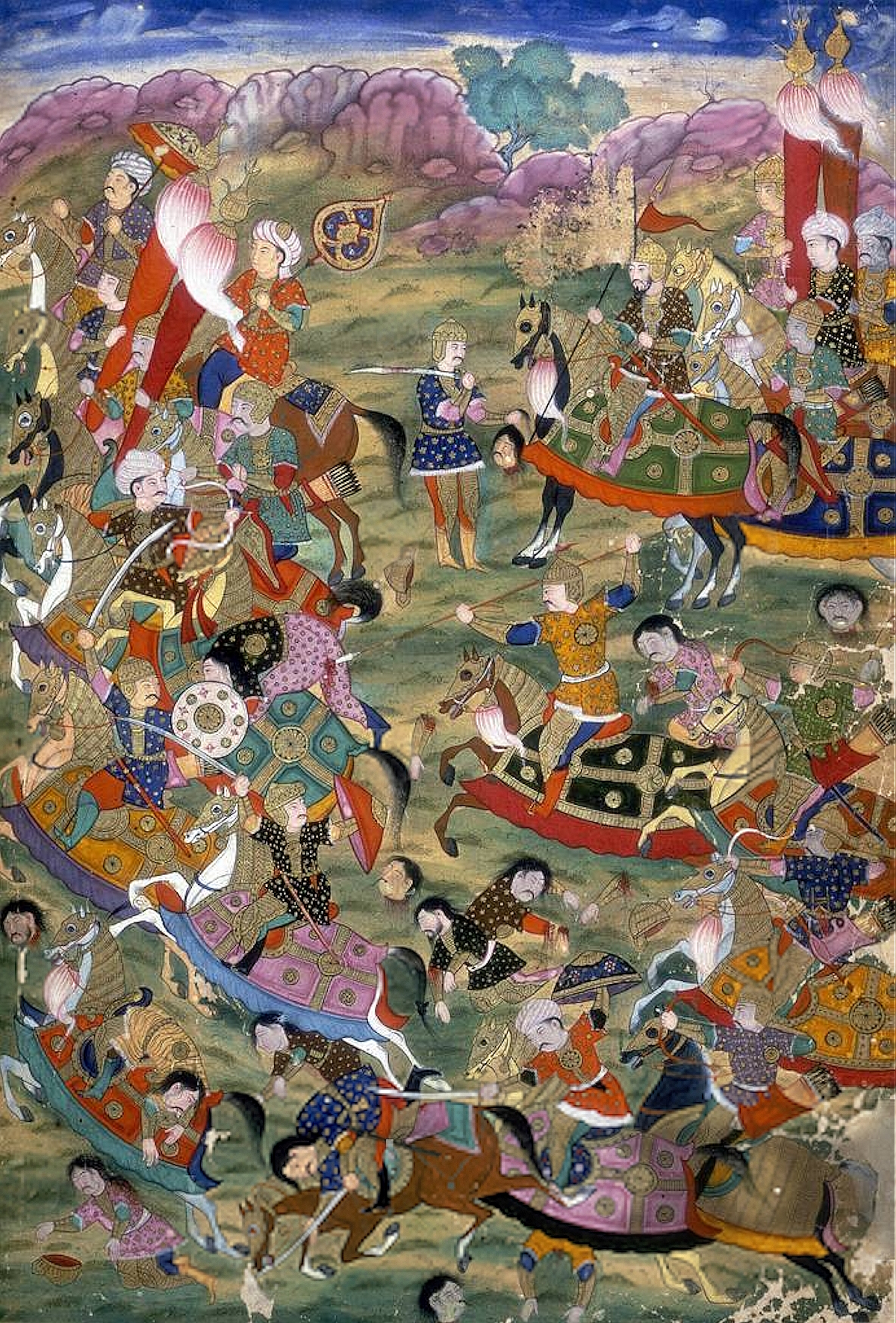
Shah Rukh presenting the head of Shah Mansur to Timur, in the Battle of Shiraz (1393). Tarikh e Khandan e Timuriyah

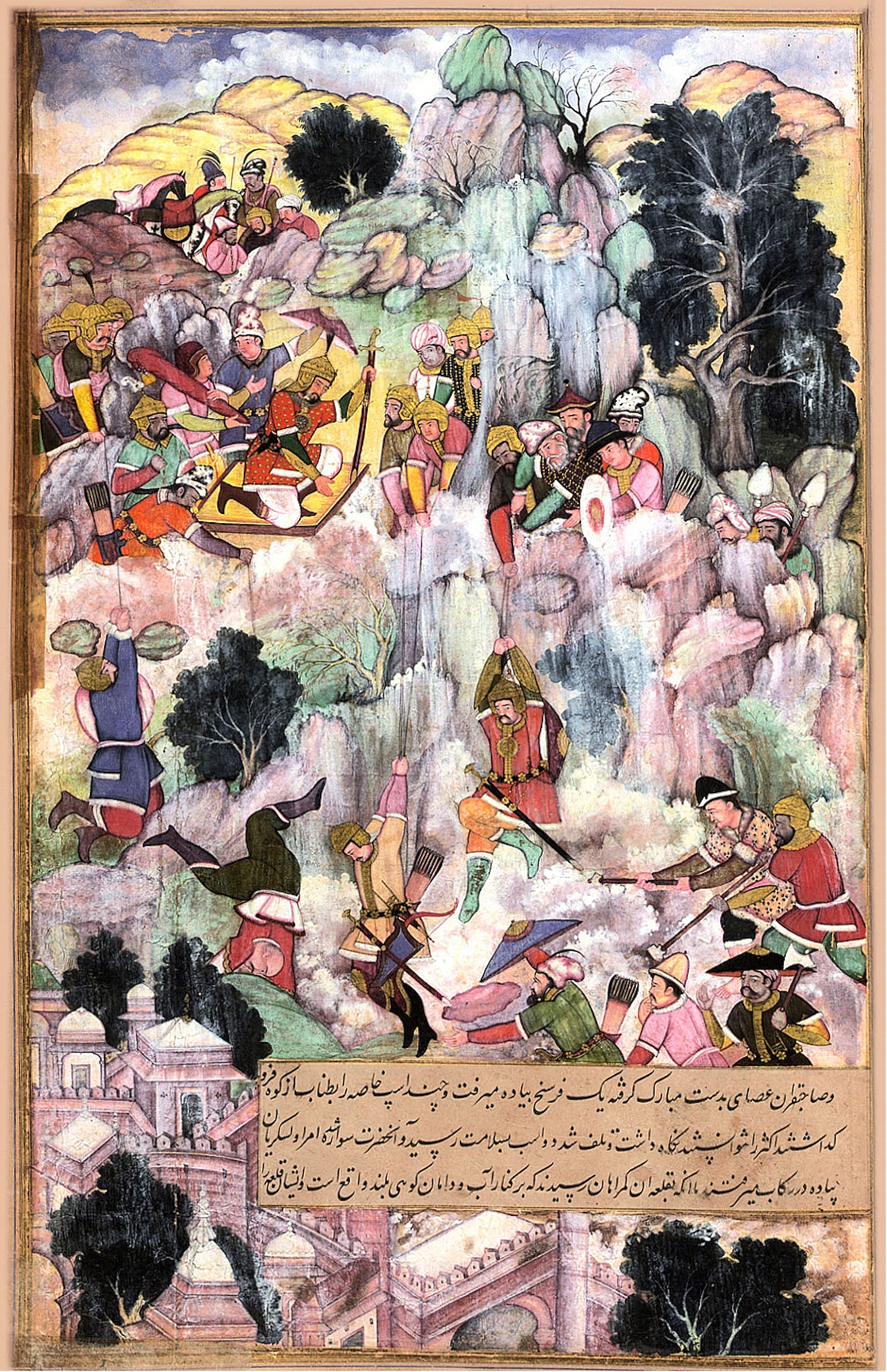
Timur’s troops lowered from the mountainside to attack the Siyah-pushan in 1398, Tarikh-i Khandan-i Timuriyya
