= Battle of Shiraz (1393) =

1393 battle in Iran

- Part of Timur's conquest of Persia
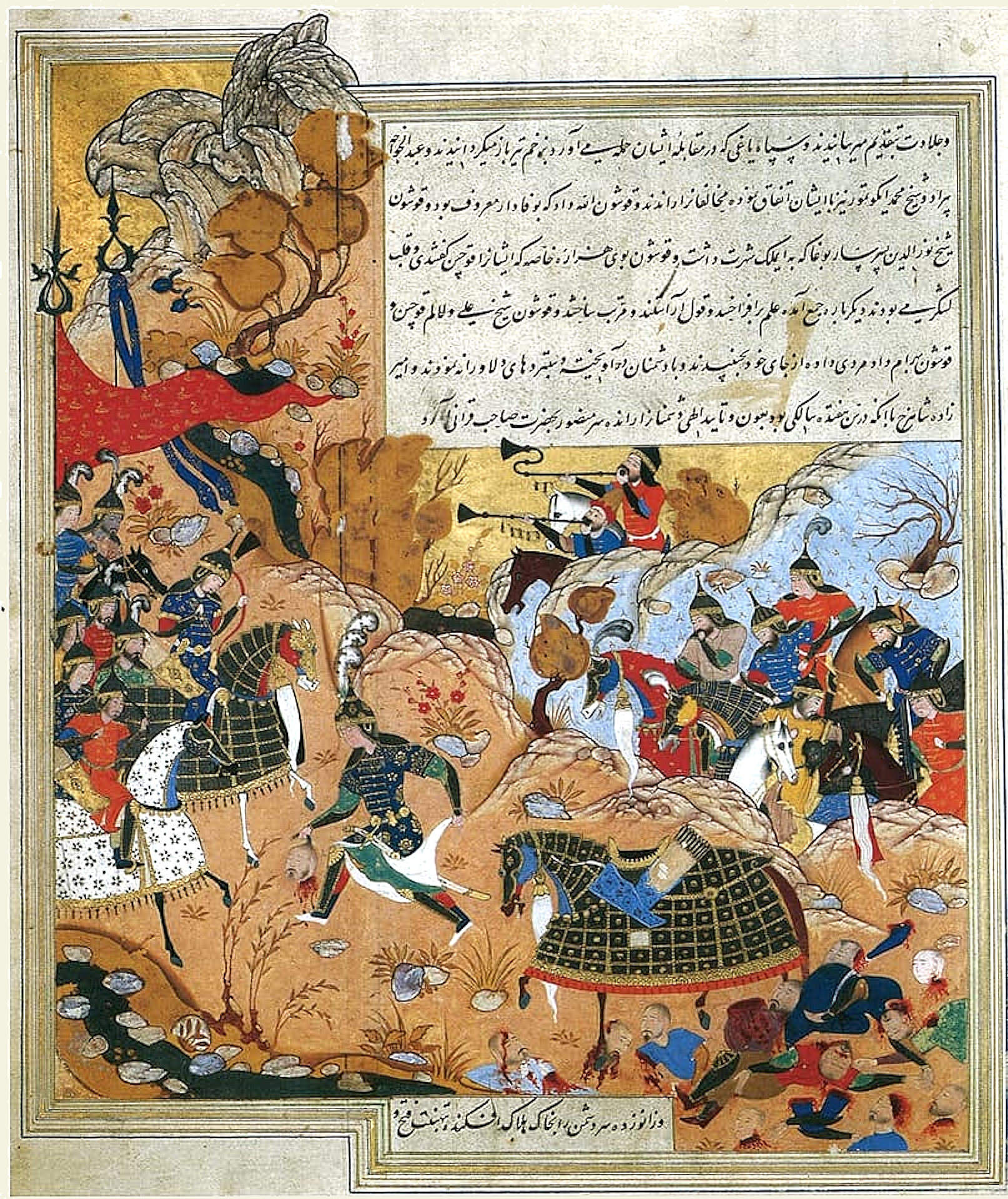
- Shah Rukh, at the age of 17, presenting the head of Shah Mansur to Timur at the Battle of Shiraz on 29 March 1393. Zafarnama (1528).
Date	Ended 29 March 1393
Location	Shiraz, Fars, Iran 29.5918°N 52.5837°E
Result	Timurid victory

Belligerents
Timurid Empire	Muzaffarid dynasty

Commanders and leaders
Timur (WIA); Shah Rukh	Shah Mansur †

Strength
30,000	4,000

Casualties and losses
Unknown	Heavy; exact numbers unknown
- Location within Iran Battle of Shiraz (1393) (West and Central Asia)

The Battle of Shiraz (1393) was a battle between the forces of the Timurid Empire and the forces of the Muzaffarid ruler Shah Mansur in 1393, near the base of the defender in Shiraz in southern Iran. It is part of Timur's five-year long campaign in Iran (1392-1397).

== Background ==
After the death of Shah Shoja Mozaffari in 1384 the Muzaffarid dynasty fragmented and the region of Fars became politically unstable. The Muzaffarids, once a dominant local dynasty in southern Iran, had been weakened by internal rivalries and external pressure from Timur’s expanding empire.

By the early 1390s, Timur launched a major campaign into western and southern Iran to secure control over key cities including Isfahan, Shiraz, and Yazd. Shiraz, as the cultural and administrative center of Fars, became a strategic objective due to its economic importance and symbolic status in Persian governance.

The campaign was to last five years, but Timur started by fighting the Muzaffarid ruler Shah Mansur, who was defying him from his base in Shiraz.. As he advanced, Timur freed the Muzaffarid prince Zain al-'Abidln from imprisonment in Qal'a-yi Safld, and treated him benevolently, promising to punish Shah Mansur.

== Siege and capture of Shiraz ==
In 1393, Timurid forces advanced into Fars and approached Shiraz. Contemporary sources suggest that the city did not mount prolonged resistance compared to other fortified urban centers in Timur’s campaigns.

Facing the overwhelming size and reputation of Timur’s army, the local administration of Shiraz opted for negotiation and submission rather than full-scale urban warfare. As a result, the city was occupied with limited destruction, and Timurid authority was established over the region. Timur’s policy in Shiraz was relatively moderate compared to other sieges, possibly influenced by the city’s economic value and cultural significance.

Following the capture of Shiraz, the city was integrated into the Timurid administrative structure governing Fars. Local governance was reorganized under Timurid-appointed officials, while elements of the existing Persian bureaucratic system were retained.

Unlike other cities that suffered severe destruction under Timur’s campaigns, Shiraz largely preserved its infrastructure and continued to function as an important cultural and literary center. The region remained under Timurid control until later political fragmentation following Timur’s death in 1405.

== Death of Shah Mansur ==
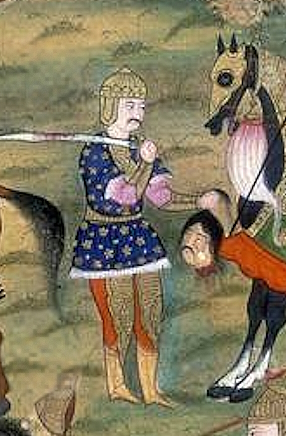
Shah Rukh, at the age of 17, presenting the head of Shah Mansur to Timur at the Battle of Shiraz in 1393. Tarikh e Khandan e Timuriyah (1577-78).

Shah Mansur fought the Timurid forces, but was defeated and decapitated by the forces of prince Shah Rukh on 29 March 1393. Shah Rukh appears to have participated to the Iranian campaigns of Timur when in returned from Transoxonia in 1392. A miniature from the Timurid Zafarnama (Zafarnama (1435-36, Shiraz)) showed Shah-Rukh, at seventeen years of age, vanquishing Shah Mansur in the battle of Shiraz (1393), but this miniature has been lost, without a remaining image. The event also appears in the Zafarnama (1528)., and in the later Mughal account of the Timurid campaigns Tarikh e Khandan e Timuriyah.

All remaining Muzaffarids proclaimed submission to Timur, but on May 1393 in Qumisha, south of Isfahan, Timur issued a supreme order for all of them to be executed. Only two Muzaffarids were spared: Zain al-'Abidln and Sultan Shibli, the eldest and the youngest sons of Shah Shoja, who were sent to the Timurid capital of Samarqand. They were reportedly provided with comfortable resources and enjoyed a pleasant life in Samarkand. Numerous men of letters and artists from Fars and Irak also resettled in Samarkand.

With the fall of the Muzaffarids, potential opposition on his southwestern flank being resolved, Timur then continued with the conquest of Jalayirid Baghdad in 1393, forcing Sultan Ahmad Jalayir to flee. He then completed the conquest of western Persia, Armenia and Azerbaijan in 1393-1394, also subjugating Georgia in 1394.

== Sources ==
- The Cambridge history of Iran: Vol. 6: Timurid and Safavid periods. Cambridge: Cambridge University Press. 2008. ISBN 9781139054980.
- Manz, Beatrice Forbes. The Rise and Rule of Tamerlane. Cambridge University Press.
- Jackson, Peter. The Mongols and the Islamic World. Yale University Press.
- Roemer, H. R. “The Timurid Dynasty” in The Cambridge History of Iran, Volume 6.
- Woods, John E. The Timurid Dynasty in Iran and Central Asia.
- Subtelny, Maria. Timurids in Transition: Turko-Persian Politics and Acculturation.
