= Charles, Duke of Orléans =

Charles, Duke of Orléans or Charles, duc d'Orléans may refer to:

- Charles I, Duke of Orléans (1394–1465)
- Charles II, Duke of Orléans (1522–1545), son of king Francis I of France
- Charles Maximilien, Duke of Orléans, later Charles IX of France (1550–1574)

== See also ==
- Charles d'Orléans (disambiguation)
