= Bona crusade =

The Bona Crusade
- Part of Crusades
Date	1399
Location	Annaba, Algeria
Result	Hafsid victory

Belligerents
Hafsid Dynasty	Crown of Aragon

Commanders and leaders
Abu Faris Abd al-Aziz II	Martin the Humane

Strength
3,000 cavalry 15,000 infantry	13 galleys 77 ships 5,000 men

Casualties and losses
Unknown	Unknown

The Bona Crusade or the Annaba crusade was a military campaign initiated by the King of Aragon Martin the Humane against the Hafsid sultanate, carried out in the summer of 1399.

== Background ==
Main articles: Sack of Torreblanca (1397) and Crusade of Tedelis

In 1398, as a result of the Sack of Torreblanca (1397) in which Telmeceni pirates captured the consecrated host and 108 prisoners, King Martin of Aragon after repelling the invasion of Matthew I of Foix ordered a retaliatory attack on Dellys.

The fleet gathered in Ibiza, amassing a total force of 70 ships and 7,500 crusaders. The fleet set sail on 21 August 1398, and successfully reached Tedelis, which was sacked, killing around 1,000 villagers. After attacking the North African Coast, the expedition then headed towards Avignon to try to relive Pope Benedict XIII from a siege led by Geoffrey Boucicaut who was opposed to the Avignon Pope. However, the fleet could not cross the Rhône due to the low water levels and directly grant aid, though they did manage to grant a three-month truce for the besieged. The following year, Martin ordered a repeat of the campaign, this time, directed at Bona.

== Crusade ==
After gathering a fleet of 6 galleys and 54 ships, and the Valencian, of 7 galleys and 23 ships in Mahón, Martin the Humane set sail on August 21. The war began on September 1, and the next day the disembarkation of most of the military personnel began. The Muslims, warned by Majorcan merchants, had defended the city and gathered a large number of fighters. After taking a small fortress near the city, the attack was abandoned.

After the siege, the Valencian and Majorcan navy separated and ended up returning to the ports of origin without having achieved any victory.

== Consequences ==
The failure of the campaign forced Martin the Humane to Treaty of Tunis (1403) sign a peace treaty with Abu-Faris Abd-al-Aziz on 15 May 1403, which soon became ineffective.
