= Isidore Glabas =

Isidore Glabas (Greek: Ἰσίδωρος Γλαβᾶς) was the metropolitan bishop of Thessalonica between 1380 and 1384, and again from 1386 until his death on 11 January 1396.

Born John Glabas in 1341/42, he became a monk on 1 April 1375. On 25 May 1380 he was named metropolitan of Thessalonica, but left the city in 1382, and was deposed in September 1384. Although reinstated in March 1386, he continued to reside in Constantinople rather than his see until some time between the summer of 1389 and October 1393, when he returned to Thessalonica. During his absence, the city was conquered by the Ottoman Turks in 1387, and he went to negotiations with them in Asia Minor.

Glabas was a correspondent of Theodore Potamios and Demetrios Kydones, and composed homilies and studies on the calculation of Easter and the Moon phases.

== Sources ==
- Trapp, Erich; Beyer, Hans-Veit (2001). Prosopographisches Lexikon der Palaiologenzeit (in German). Vol. I, 1–12, Add. 1–2, CD-ROM Version. Vienna: Verlag der Österreichischen Akademie der Wissenschaften. ISBN 978-3-7001-3003-1.
