= Crusade of Tedelis =

14th Century Conflict

Date	27 August, 1398
Location	Tedelis, Kingdom of Tlemcen
Result	Aragonese victory

Belligerents
Crown of Aragon	Kingdom of Tlemcen

Commanders and leaders
Jofré de Rocabertí; Hugo de Anglesola †	Unknown

Strength
70 ships 7,500 crusaders	Unknown

Casualties and losses
Low	1,000 killed 300 captured

The Crusade of Tedelis was a major conflict within the overarching struggle between the Crown of Aragon and the Kingdom of Tlemcen in the late 14th century.

== Background ==
In 1397, as a result of the Sack of Torreblanca, in which Tlemceni pirates captured the consecrated host and 108 prisoners, King Martin of Aragon ordered a retaliatory attack on Dellys also known as Tedelis, chartering a fleet led by Joan Gascó and an army led by Jaume de Pertusa.

== Crusade ==
The fleet gathered in Ibiza, amassing a total force of 70 ships and 7,500 crusaders. The fleet set sail in August 1398, and successfully reached Dellys, which was sacked, killing around 1,000 villagers.

After attacking the North African Coast, the expedition then headed towards Avignon to try to relieve Pope Benedict XIII from a siege led by Geoffrey Boucicaut who was opposed to the Avignon Pope. However, the fleet could not cross the Rhône due to low water levels and directly provide aid, though they did manage to grant a three-month truce for the besieged.

== Aftermath ==
King Martin managed to negotiate the release of the captured Aragonese in exchange for releasing 300 Tlmeceni prisoners captured during the raid on Tedelis. The following year, Martin ordered a repeat of the campaign, this time, directed at Bona.
