= James of Jülich =

James of Jülich (Jacob van Gulik) (died 1392) was a Franciscan friar who, while falsely claiming to be a bishop, was sentenced by a tribunal of seven bishops to be boiled alive after it was discovered he had ordained a number of priests following his admittance as an auxiliary bishop by Floris van Wevelinkhoven, Bishop of Utrecht. Despite the scandal caused, his sentence was later mitigated in execution.
