= Osbern Bokenam =

15th-century English friar and poet

Osbern Bokenam (c. 1393 – c. 1464, also spelt Bokenham) was an English Augustinian (Austin) friar and poet. He was a follower of Geoffrey Chaucer.

== Life ==
Osbern Bokenam was born, according to his own account, on 6 October 1393. His name suggests he may have been a native of Bokeham, now Bookham, in Surrey, or of Buckenham in Norfolk. In a concluding note to his Lives of the Saints, Bokenam is described as a "Suffolke man, frere Austyn of Stoke Clare" (friar at Clare Priory in Suffolk).

Bokenam travelled in Italy on at least two occasions, possibly living for a time in Venice and Rome. In 1445 he was a pilgrim to Santiago de Compostela in Spain.

== Writings ==
Bokenam wrote a series of 13 legends of holy maidens and women, chiefly in seven and eight-lined stanzas. Nine of these have prologues. Bokenam was a follower of Chaucer and Lydgate, and doubtless had in mind Chaucer's Legend of Good Women. His chief, but by no means only source was the Legenda Aurea of Jacobus de Voragine, Archbishop of Genoa, whom he cites as "Januence". The first of the legends, Vita S[an]c[t]ae Margaretae, virginis et martyris (Life of St Margaret, Virgin and Martyr), was written for a friend, Thomas Burgh, a Cambridge monk. This is one of the few versions of the Life of St Margaret that includes a translation of her relics. Bokenam also describes the physical pain he endured in the act of writing the life. Others are dedicated to pious ladies who desired the history of the patron saints after whom they had been named.

The Arundel MS. 327 (in the British Museum) is a unique copy of Bokenam's work. It was finished, according to the concluding note, in 1447, and presented by the scribe, Thomas Burgh, to an unnamed convent "that the nuns may remember him and his sister, Dame Betrice Burgh."

The poems were edited in 1835 for the Roxburghe Club with the title Lyvys of Seyntys..., and by Dr Carl Horstmann as Osbern Bokenams Legenden (Heilbronn, 1883), in Eugen Kölbing's Altengl. Bibliothek, vol. i. Both editions include a dialogue written in Latin and English, taken from William Dugdale's Monasticon Anglicanum (ed. 1846, vol. vi, p. 1600), between a "Secular asking and a Frere answerynge at the grave of Dame Johan of Acres [who] shewith the lyneal descent of the lordis of the honore of Clare fro... MCCXLVIII to... MCCCLVI". Bokenam wrote, as he tells us plainly, in the Suffolk speech. He explains his lack of decoration on the plea that the finest flowers had been already plucked by Chaucer, Gower and Lydgate.

In 2004 a manuscript copy of Bokenam's version of Legenda Aurea was found in the library of Abbotsford House, Scotland. It had been bought in 1809 by Sir Walter Scott and then forgotten.
