= Shah Mansur (Muzaffarid) =

Ruler of the Muzaffarids from 1391 to 1393

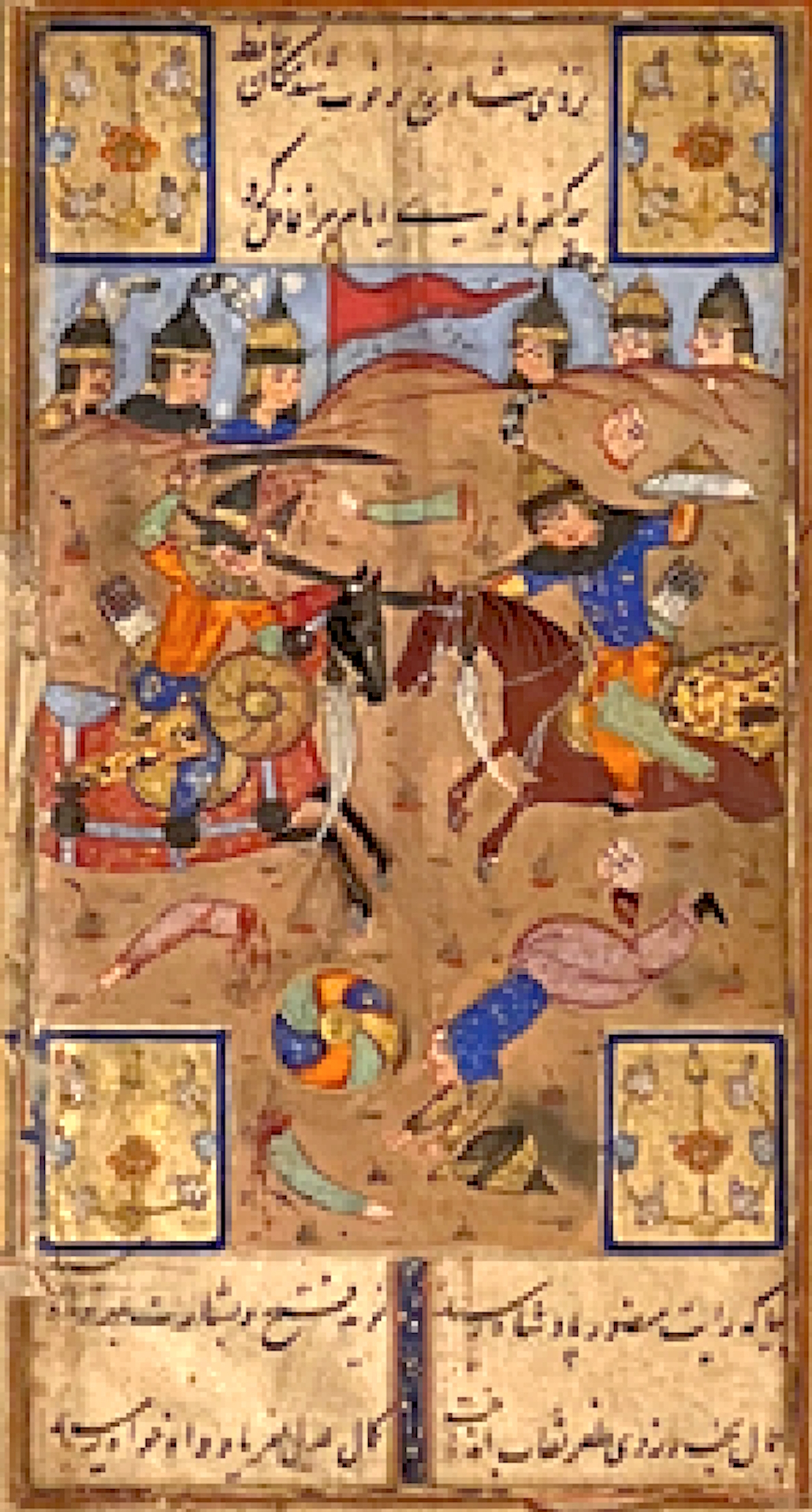
- The triumph of Shah Mansur. Divan of Hafiz (1550-1600), Safavid. Shiraz.

Shah of the Muzaffarid dynasty
- Reign: 1391-1393
- Predecessor: Shah Yahya (in Shiraz, 1387–1391); Sultan Ahmad (in Kerman, 1387–1391); Sultan Abu Ishaq (in Sirajan 1387–1391)
- Successor: Timurid conquest
- Died: 29 March 1393; Shiraz, Fars
- Dynasty: Muzaffarid
- Father: Shah Muzaffar
- Religion: Sunni Islam

Shah Mansur (ruled 1391-1393) was the last of the Muzaffarid rulers of Southern Iran. He ruled from Isfahan and was killed by the forces of Timur in 29 March 1393.

== Life ==
Mansur was the brother of Shah Yahya and Shah Hosein. His uncle was Shah Shoja, with whom he fought against in battle.

== First Timurid offensive (1387) ==
In 1387, Timur attacked Isfahan in the Siege of Isfahan (1387). The governor, Muzaffar-i Kashi, gave the keys to the city. When the city revolted against Timurid taxes, Timur ordered a slaughter of the population. The Muzaffarid ruler Zain al-Abidin fled to his capital Shiraz, with the intent of reaching Baghdad. On the way, he was imprisoned by his brother Shah Mansur.

Timur easily captured Shiraz. Shah Mansur then submitted to Timur, and Timur installed in Shiraz Nusrat al-DIn Shah Yahya, a nephew of Shah Shoja. Timur left for Tansoxonia, to face an incursion by Tokhtamish.

With support from the Jalayirid Sultanate, Mansur established himself as an independent ruler in Shushtar. Meanwhile Shah Mansur tried to reinstate the Muzaffarid state and managed to recapture Shiraz, from which Shah Yahya fled, but failed to take Isfahan. In contrast, Zain al-'Abidin managed to escape and was welcomed by the population of Isfahan. Zain al-'Abidin tried to form an alliance against Shah Mansur, but he was defeated in battle. When trying to flee into Khurasan, he was captured by the local ruler Musa Jaukar, who remitted him to Shah Mansur, who had him imprisoned and blinded in Qal'a-yi Safid.

== Second Timurid offensive (1392-93) ==
Timur returned from Transoxonia in 1392, to start a new five-year campaign against Iran. Shah Mansur prepared to face him from his base in Shiraz. As he advanced, Timur freed prince Zain al-'Abidln from imprisonment in Qal'a-yi Safld, and treated him benevolently, promising to punish Shah Mansur. At the Battle of Shiraz (1393), Shah Mansur fought the Timurid forces, but was defeated and decapitated by the forces of prince Shah Rukh.

All remaining Muzaffarids proclaimed submission to Timur, but on May 1393 in Qumisha, south of Isfahan, Timur issued a supreme order for all of them to be executed. Only two Muzaffarids were spared: Zain al-'Abidln and Sultan Shibli, the eldest and the youngest sons of Shah Shoja, who were sent to the Timurid capital of Samarqand. They were reportedly provided with comfortable resources and enjoyed a pleasant life in Samarkand. Numerous men of letters and artists from Fars and Irak also resettled in Samarkand.

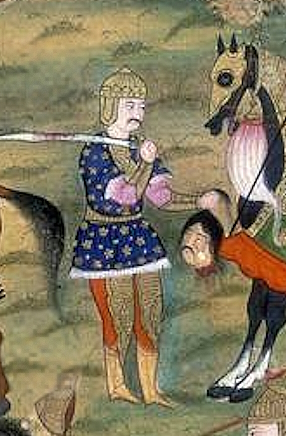
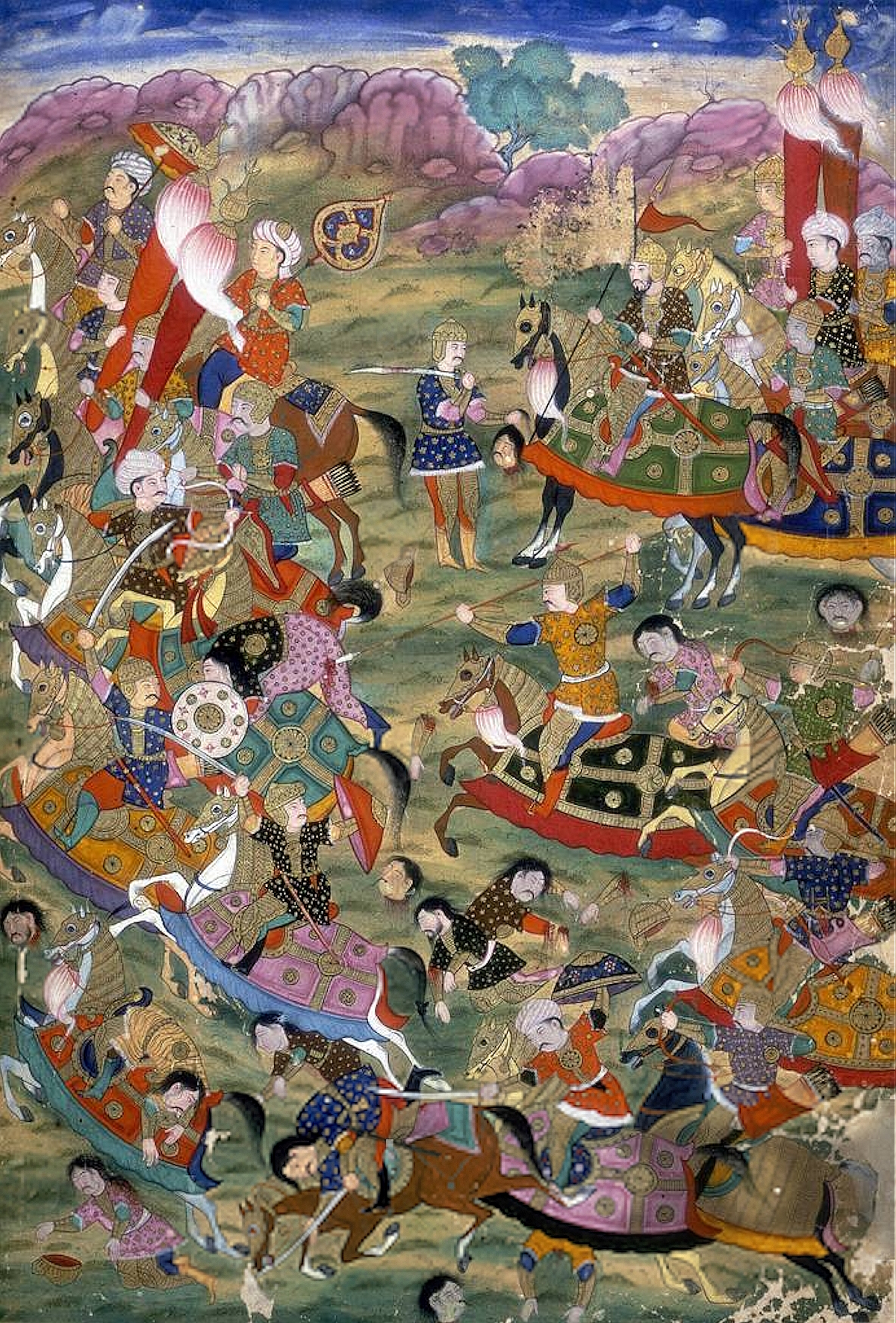
Shah Rukh, at the age of 17, presenting the head of Shah Mansur to Timur at the Battle of Shiraz in 1393. Tarikh e Khandan e Timuriyah (1577-78).

Mansur's grave is located in the eastern part of Shiraz, in an area known as Gowd-e-Shahzadeh (Prince Mansur's Tomb).

== Literature ==
The poet Hafez Shirazi (1325–1390) had particular affection for Shah Mansur, and the ruler appears in several miniatures and is mentioned several times in The Divān of Hafez.

The king of kings is the Glorious Mozaffar, the honor of the state and religion, Mansur,

Whose unsparing generosity laughed at the spring clouds.
From the hour the cup of wine was honored by his hand,
The world has drunk the cup of happiness to the topers'health.
From his head-chopping sword, that day victory shone when
He alone attacked thousands [of soldiers] like a starconsuming sun.
O heart, pray for God's grace for the continuation of his life and kingdom.
For heavens minted this coin of fortune to last for [many] days.

— Divān of Hafez CLIII.

A miniature from the Timurid Zafarnama (Zafarnama (1435-36, Shiraz)) showed Shah-Rukh vanquishing the Muzaffarid ruler Shah Mansur Muzaffar in 1393 (miniature nb 10, folio 236b), but this miniature has been lost, without a remaining image. The event appears however in the later Mughal account of the Timurid campaigns Tarikh e Khandan e Timuriyah.

== Sources ==
- Jackson, Peter. "Muzaffarids." Encyclopaedia of Islam, Volume VII (Mif-Naz). New ed. 1993. ISBN 90-04-09419-9
- M. Ismail Marcinkowski, Persian Historiography and Geography: Bertold Spuler on Major Works Produced in Iran, the Caucasus, Central Asia, India and Early Ottoman Turkey, with a foreword by Professor Clifford Edmund Bosworth, member of the British Academy, Singapore: Pustaka Nasional, 2003, ISBN 9971-77-488-7.
- Roemer, H. R. "The Jalayirids, Muzaffarids and Sarbadars." The Cambridge History of Iran Volume 6: The Timurid and Safavid Periods. Edited by Peter Jackson. New York: Cambridge University Press, 1986. ISBN 0-521-20094-6
- Komaroff, Linda (2012). Beyond the Legacy of Genghis Khan. Brill. pp. 1–678. ISBN 9789047418573.
- Khorramshahi, Bahaʾ-al-Din (2012). "Hafez ii. Hafez's life and limes". Encyclopaedia Iranica, Vol. XI, Fasc. 5. pp. 465–469.
- Perry, John R. (2011). "Karim Khan Zand". Encyclopaedia Iranica, Vol. XV, Fasc. 6. pp. 561–564.
- Loloi, Parvin (2004). Hafiz, Master of Persian Poetry: A Critical Bibliography. I.B.Tauris. pp. 1–392. ISBN 9781860649233.
- Wing, Patrick (2014). "Mozaffarids". Encyclopaedia Iranica.
- Encyclopedia of Türk - Volume 8
- The Cambridge history of Iran: Vol. 6: Timurid and Safavid periods. Cambridge: Cambridge University Press. 2008. ISBN 9781139054980.
- Limbert, John W. (2011). Shiraz in the Age of Hafez: The Glory of a Medieval Persian City. University of Washington Press. pp. 1–192. ISBN 9780295802886.
- Wing, Patrick (2014). "Mozaffarids". Encyclopaedia Iranica.
