= Battle of Ros-Mhic-Thriúin =

1394 battle

Battle of Ros Mhic Thriúin
- An allegorical painting of Art MacMurrough-Kavanagh (right) meeting the Earl of Glouster.
Date	1394
Location	near New Ross, County Wexford, Ireland
Result	Gaelic Irish victory

Belligerents
Kingdom of Leinster	Lordship of Ireland

Commanders and leaders
Art MacMurrough-Kavanagh	unknown

The Battle of Ros Mhic Thriúin took place in 1394 near New Ross, County Wexford, Ireland. It pitted the Irish of Leinster against the Anglo-Irish nobles . The forces of Leinster were led by King Art Óg Mac Murchadha Caomhánach (known in English as Art MacMurrough). The Irish were victorious.
