= 1334 =

1334 in various calendars
- Gregorian calendar: 1334; MCCCXXXIV
- Ab urbe condita: 2087
- Armenian calendar: 783; ԹՎ ՉՁԳ
- Assyrian calendar: 6084
- Balinese saka calendar: 1255–1256
- Bengali calendar: 740–741
- Berber calendar: 2284
- English Regnal year: 7 Edw. 3 – 8 Edw. 3
- Buddhist calendar: 1878
- Burmese calendar: 696
- Byzantine calendar: 6842–6843
- Chinese calendar: 癸酉年 (Water Rooster); 4031 or 3824 — to — 甲戌年 (Wood Dog); 4032 or 3825
- Coptic calendar: 1050–1051
- Discordian calendar: 2500
- Ethiopian calendar: 1326–1327
- Hebrew calendar: 5094–5095
- Hindu calendars
- Vikram Samvat: 1390–1391
- Shaka Samvat: 1255–1256
- Kali Yuga: 4434–4435
- Holocene calendar: 11334
- Igbo calendar: 334–335
- Iranian calendar: 712–713
- Islamic calendar: 734–735
- Japanese calendar: Shōkei 3 (正慶３年)
- Javanese calendar: 1246–1247
- Julian calendar: 1334; MCCCXXXIV
- Korean calendar: 3667
- Minguo calendar: 578 before ROC 民前578年
- Nanakshahi calendar: −134
- Thai solar calendar: 1876–1877
- Tibetan calendar: ཆུ་མོ་བྱ་ལོ་ (female Water-Bird); 1460 or 1079 or 307 — to — ཤིང་ཕོ་ཁྱི་ལོ་ (male Wood-Dog); 1461 or 1080 or 308

Year 1334 (MCCCXXXIV) was a common year starting on Saturday of the Julian calendar.

== Events ==
=== January–December ===
- July 18 – The bishop of Florence blesses the first foundational stone laid for the new campanile (bell tower) of the Florence Cathedral (the tower was designed by the artist Giotto).
- December 30 – Pope Benedict XII succeeds Pope John XXII, as the 197th pope.

=== Date unknown ===
- Autumn – Battle of Adramyttion: A Christian league defeats the fleet of the Turkish Beylik of Karasi.

== Births ==
- January 4 – Amadeus VI, Count of Savoy (d. 1383)
- January 13 – King Henry II of Castile (d. 1379)
- May 25 – Emperor Sukō (d. 1398)
- August 30 – King Peter of Castile (d. 1369)
- date unknown
  - King James I of Cyprus (d. 1398)
  - Margaret Graham, Countess of Menteith, Scottish noble (d. c. 1380)
  - Hayam Wuruk, Javanese ruler (d. 1389)

== Deaths ==
- January 17 – John of Brittany, Earl of Richmond (b. c. 1266)
- December 4 – Pope John XXII (b. 1249)
- date unknown – Sheikh Safi-ad-din Ardabili of Persia (b. 1251)
- Isabella de Vesci, politically active French noblewoman (b. 1260s)
