= Charles d'Orléans =

Charles d'Orléans may refer to:

- Charles I, Duke of Orléans (1394–1465), son of Louis I, Duke of Orléans and Valentina Visconti
- Charles, Count of Angoulême (1459–1496), son of John, Count of Angoulême
- Charles II, Duke of Orléans (1522–1545), son of King Francis I of France
- Charles Paris d'Orléans, Duke of Longueville (1649–1672), French military commander
- Charles d'Orléans de Rothelin (1691–1744), French churchman and scholar
- Charles d'Orléans, Duke of Penthièvre (1820–1828), son of Louis Philippe, Duke of Orléans and Maria Amalia of Naples
- Prince Charles Philippe, Duke of Nemours (1905–1970), son of Prince Emmanuel, Duke of Vendôme
- Prince Charles-Philippe, Duke of Anjou (born 1973), son of Prince Michel, Count of Évreux

== See also ==
- Charles, Duke of Orléans (disambiguation)
