= Geoffrey Boucicaut =

Brother of Jean le Maingre

Geoffrey Boucicaut, was the brother of the illustrious marshal of France Jean le Maingre. He and his army occupied Avignon in 1398 and started a five-year siege of the Palais des Papes where the Avignon Pope Benedict XIII was, which ended when Benedict managed to escape from Avignon on 12 March 1403 and find shelter in territory belonging to Louis II of Anjou.
