= 1480s =

Decade

The 1480s decade ran from January 1, 1480, to December 31, 1489.

== Events ==
=== 1480 ===
==== January–December ====
- March 6 – Treaty of Toledo: Ferdinand and Isabella of Spain recognize the African conquests of Afonso V of Portugal, and he cedes the Canary Islands to Spain (see Treaty of Alcáçovas).
- July 28
  - Mehmed II fails in his attempt to capture Rhodes from the Knights of Rhodes.
  - An Ottoman army lands near Otranto, Italy. Pope Sixtus IV calls for a crusade to drive it away.
- September 27 – Consorts and co-rulers Ferdinand II of Aragon and Isabella I of Castile initiate the Spanish Inquisition (looking for heretics and unconverted Jews).
- October – Great Stand on the Ugra River: Muscovy becomes independent from the Golden Horde. The Theotokos of Vladimir icon is credited with saving Moscow.

==== Date unknown ====
- The Lighthouse of Alexandria's final remains disappear when Qaitbay, Sultan of Egypt, builds the Citadel of Qaitbay on its site.
- Magdalen College School, Oxford, is established by William Waynflete.

=== 1481 ===
==== January–December ====
- May 3
  - The 1481 Rhodes earthquake, the largest of a series, strikes the island of Rhodes, causing an estimated 30,000 casualties.
  - Mehmed II, Sultan of the Ottoman Empire, dies and is succeeded by his son, Bayezid II.
- May 21 – Christian I, King of Denmark and Norway, dies and is succeeded by his son John (1481–1513).
- June 21 – The papal bull Aeterni Regis grants all land south of the Canary Islands to Portugal.
- July 24 – Fire destroys the roof and the spires of Reims Cathedral.
- August 29 – John II of Portugal starts to rule in his own right.
- September 10 – Alphonso II of Naples recaptures the city of Otranto.
- December 10 – With the death of Duke Charles IV of Anjou, Anjou reverts to the French crown under Louis XI of France, as does the Provence, which until then was part of the Holy Roman Empire.
- December 26 – Battle of Westbroek: Holland defeats the troops of Utrecht.

==== Date unknown ====
- The Constitució de l'Observança is approved by the Catalan Courts, establishing the submission of royal power to the laws of the Principality of Catalonia.
- Ludovico Sforza emerges as Regent of Milan (until 1499).
- Axayacatl, Aztec ruler of Tenochtitlan, dies and is succeeded by his brother Tízoc.
- The Aztec Calendar Stone or Sun Stone is carved.
- Fribourg and Solothurn become Cantons of Switzerland.

=== 1482 ===
==== January–December ====
- January 19 – A Portuguese fleet, commanded by Diogo de Azambuja, arrives at the mouth of the River Benya on the Gold Coast, where the fort of São Jorge da Mina (Elmina Castle) is erected.
- January 25 – Probable first printing of the Torah, in Bologna.
- February 28 –The village of Alhama de Granada in Spain is taken by Christian forces, starting the Granada War to expel the Moors from the Iberian Peninsula.
- February – Johann Reuchlin leaves Stuttgart to visit Florence where he meets Marsilio Ficino.
- March 22 – Pope Sixtus IV, in a special bull, grants self-government rights to the Italian town of Ascoli Piceno.
- March 27 – The death of Mary of Burgundy triggers the first of the Flemish revolts against Maximilian of Austria.
- April 3 – Symeon I succeeds Maximus III as Ecumenical Patriarch of Constantinople.
- c. August – Portuguese navigator Diogo Cão becomes the first European to enter the Congo.
- August 1 – Anglo-Scottish Wars: Richard, Duke of Gloucester invades Scotland, and captures Edinburgh.
- August 24 – Capture of Berwick: The Scots surrender the border town of Berwick-upon-Tweed to Richard, ending his campaign.
- December 23 – Treaty of Arras divides the Burgundian Netherlands between King Louis XI of France and Archduke Maximilian I of Habsburg.

==== Date unknown ====
- Ivan III renounces the Mongol Khanate rule over Russia.
- Johannes Trithemius becomes a novice, at the abbey of St. Martin at Sponheim, in the Diocese of Mainz.
- The first edition of Euclid's Elements (Latin translation) is printed, by German printer Erhard Ratdolt in Venice, incorporating geometric diagrams.
- Schreierstoren is erected in Amsterdam (from which Henry Hudson will set sail on April 4, 1609, on the vessel Halve Maen, to bring him to the harbor of New York and the Hudson River).

=== 1483 ===
==== January–December ====
- January 1 – The Jews are expelled from Andalusia.
- February 11 – The General Council of the Inquisition is created in Spain.
- April 9 – Edward V becomes King of England.
- April 29 – Gran Canaria, the main island of the Canary Islands, is conquered by the Kingdom of Castile, a very important step in the expansion of Spain.
- April 30 – Pluto moves inside Neptune's orbit until July 23, 1503, according to modern orbital calculations.
- April – King Edward V of England and his younger brother Richard, Duke of York reside in the Tower of London. Later this year, rumors of their murders start circulating. By December the rumors have reached France. This is the beginning of the mystery concerning the fates of the two Princes in the Tower.
- June 13 – William Hastings, 1st Baron Hastings, is executed, in the first recorded execution at the Tower of London.
- June 20 – The powerful Fernando II, Duke of Braganza is executed in Portugal, followed by more than 80 other noblemen, for his plot against the royal crown.
- June 25 – Before his coronation, King Edward V of England is deposed by his uncle, Richard, Duke of Gloucester, who becomes King as Richard III of England.
- July 6 – Richard III and Anne Neville are crowned king and Queen of England, at Westminster Abbey.
- July 20 – John of Denmark is crowned King of Norway.
- August 15 – The Sistine Chapel opens in the Apostolic Palace in Rome.
- September 3 – The Princes in the Tower, uncrowned 12-year-old Edward V of England and his 10-year-old brother, Richard, Duke of York, are perhaps murdered this night in the Tower of London.
- October – A rebellion by the Duke of Buckingham is crushed by Richard III of England.
- October 29 – Battle of Una: Forces of the Kingdom of Croatia defeat the army of the Ottoman Empire.

==== Date unknown ====
- Isaac Abravanel flees Portugal, after being implicated in a plot against the king.
- The Prince of Moscow builds the fortress of Ivangorod, facing Narva.
- Giovanni Bellini is named official painter of the Republic of Venice.
- Flavio Biondo publishes his Historiarum ab inclinatione romanorum imperii.

=== 1484 ===
==== January–December ====
- March 26 – William Caxton, the first printer of books in English, prints his translation of Aesop's Fables in London.
- May 30 – Charles VIII of France (Charles l'Affable) is crowned.
- June 22 – The first known book printed by a woman, Anna Rügerin, is an edition of Eike of Repgow's compendium of customary law, the Sachsenspiegel, produced in Augsburg.
- July 6 – Portuguese sea captain Diogo Cão finds the mouth of the Congo River.
- July 22 – Battle of Lochmaben Fair: A 500-man raiding party led by Alexander Stewart, Duke of Albany, and James Douglas, 9th Earl of Douglas, is defeated by forces loyal to Albany's brother James III of Scotland; Douglas is captured.
- August 29 – Pope Innocent VIII succeeds Pope Sixtus IV, as the 213th pope.
- September 21 – Treaty of Nottingham: A three-year truce between the kingdoms of England and Scotland is signed.
- December 5 – Pope Innocent VIII issues the Papal bull Summis desiderantes affectibus, giving the Inquisition a mission to hunt heretics and witches in Germany, led by Heinrich Kramer and Jacob Sprenger.

==== Date unknown ====
- The first sugar mill becomes operational in the Gran Canaria.
- The first cuirassier units (kyrissers) are formed in Austria.
- The King of Portugal appoints a commission of mathematicians to perfect tables, to help seamen find their latitude.
- Maximilian I, Duke of Burgundy, orders foreign merchants to leave Bruges. Most merchants move to Antwerp, greatly contributing to its growth as an international trading center.
- Battle of Leitzersdorf: The Imperial Army of Frederick III, Holy Roman Emperor is defeated by the Hungarians.

=== 1485 ===
==== January–December ====
- Spring – Multiple earthquakes occur near Taishan, China.
- March 16 – A solar eclipse crosses northern South America and Central Europe.
- June 1 – Matthias of Hungary takes Vienna, in his conquest of Austria (from Frederick III), and makes the city his capital.
- August 5–7 – The first outbreak of sweating sickness in England begins.
- August 22 – Battle of Bosworth: King Richard III of England is defeated by (rival claimant to the throne of England) Henry Tudor, Earl of Richmond; Richard dies in battle, and Henry Tudor becomes King Henry VII of England (although Henry marks this battle as August 21, so that he can declare all his opponents traitors).
- September 12 – Muscovian forces conquer Tver.
- September 15 – Peter Arbues is assaulted while praying in the cathedral at Zaragoza, Spain; he dies on September 17. He had been appointed Inquisitor of Aragon by the Inquisitor General, Tomás de Torquemada, in the campaign against heresy and crypto-Judaism.
- October 30 – King Henry VII of England is crowned.
- November 2 – The Peace of Bourges stops the Mad War.

==== Date unknown ====
- Leon Battista Alberti's De Re Aedificatoria (written 1443–1452 and published posthumously) becomes the first printed work on architecture.
- From about this date, Leonardo da Vinci produces a number of designs for flying machines, including the aerial screw or helicopter (probably unworkable).

=== 1486 ===
==== January–December ====
- January 18 – King Henry VII of England and Elizabeth of York are married, uniting the House of Lancaster and the House of York, after the Wars of the Roses.
- February 16 – Archduke Maximilian I of Habsburg is elected King of the Romans at Frankfurt (crowned April 9 at Aachen).
- February 18 – Lord Chaitanya Mahaprabhu is born in the town of Nadia, West Bengal, India, just after sunset. He is regarded as an incarnation, or avatar, of Lord Krsna, and later comes to inaugurate the sankirtana movement, or the chanting of the Holy Names of the Lord. This chanting, or mantra meditation, is first brought to the United States in 1965, by A.C. Bhaktivedanta Swami Prabhupada.
- April 21 – The adoption of the Sentència Arbitral de Guadalupe ends the War of the Remences, in the Principality of Catalonia.

==== Date unknown ====
- Tízoc, Aztec ruler of Tenochtitlan, dies. Some sources suggest that he was poisoned, others that he was the victim of "sorcery" or illness. He is succeeded by his brother Āhuitzotl.
- Sigismund, Archduke of Tyrol, issues Europe's first large silver coin, the guldengroschen, which will later become the thaler.
- Giovanni Pico della Mirandola returns to Florence, and writes Oration on the Dignity of Man.
- The Medici giraffe arrives in Florence.
- Johann Reuchlin begins studying the Hebrew language.
- The first written use of the word football to describe the ball.

=== 1487 ===
==== January–December ====
- January 29 – Richard Foxe becomes Bishop of Exeter.
- March – Sigismund, Archduke of Austria, largely on the poor advice of his counselors, declares war on Venice, and seizes silver mines in and around the Sugana Valley.
- May 24 – Lambert Simnel is crowned King "Edward VI of England" in Christ Church Cathedral, Dublin, Ireland. He claims to be Edward Plantagenet, 17th Earl of Warwick, and challenges Henry VII for the throne of England, where he lands on June 5.
- June 16 – Battle of Stoke Field: The rebellion of pretender Lambert Simnel, led by John de la Pole, Earl of Lincoln, and Francis Lovell, 1st Viscount Lovell, is crushed by troops loyal to Henry VII.
- August – Bartolomeu Dias leaves Lisbon, on his voyage to the Cape of Good Hope.
- August 13 – The Siege of Málaga (1487) ends, when the Spanish take the city.
- September 9 – Hongzhi becomes Emperor of China (Ming Dynasty).
- November 30 – Albert IV, Duke of Bavaria promulgates the Reinheitsgebot, specifying three ingredients – water, malt and hops – for the brewing of beer.

==== Date unknown ====
- Afonso de Paiva and Pêro da Covilhã travel overland from Lisbon, in search of the Kingdom of Prester John (Ethiopia).
- The witch-hunters' manual Malleus Maleficarum, written by Heinrich Kramer with Jacob Sprenger, is published at Speyer in the Holy Roman Empire.
- Aztec emperor Ahuitzotl dedicates the Great Temple Pyramid of Tenochtitlán, with thousands of human sacrifices.
- Italian architects work on the Moscow Kremlin.
- Leonardo da Vinci creates his Vitruvian Man drawing (approximate date).
- Stockport Grammar School is founded, in the north of England.

=== 1488 ===
==== January–December ====
- January 8 – The Royal Netherlands Navy is formed, by the decree of Maximillian of Austria.
- February 3 – Bartolomeu Dias of Portugal lands in Mossel Bay, after rounding the Cape of Good Hope at the tip of Africa, becoming the first known European to travel this far south, and entering the Indian Ocean.
- February 28 – Choe Bu (1454–1504), the Korean Commissioner of Registers for the island of Cheju, shipwrecks on the south east coast of China in Taizhou, Zhejiang.
- June 11 – Battle of Sauchieburn: James IV of Scotland becomes king after his father is killed in action.
- July 12 – Joseon Dynasty official Choe Bu returns to Korea, after months of shipwrecked travel in China.
- July 28 – Battle of Saint-Aubin-du-Cormier: Troops loyal to King Charles VIII of France defeat rebel forces, led by the Dukes of Orleans and Brittany, in the main engagement of the Mad War.
- September 9 – Anne of Brittany becomes Duchess of Brittany at the age of 11. Her marriage to King Charles VIII in 1491 effectively ends Breton independence from France.

==== Date unknown ====
- Jasper Tudor, 1st Duke of Bedford, takes possession of Cardiff Castle.
- Michelangelo Buonarroti becomes apprentice to Domenico Ghirlandaio.
- The city of Bikaner in western India is founded by Rao Bika.
- Rathbornes Candles is established in Dublin; the company is still trading in the 21st century.

=== 1489 ===
==== January–December ====
- March 14 – The Queen of Cyprus, Catherine Cornaro, sells her kingdom to the Republic of Venice.
- March 26 – The Treaty of Medina del Campo between England and Spain includes provision for a marriage between Arthur, the son of King Henry VII of England, and Infanta Catherine of Aragon.
- June 29 – King James IV grants Andrew, Lord Gray, the lands and Barony of Lundie in Scotland.
- July 17 – Delhi Sultanate: Sikandar Lodi succeeds Bahlul Khan Lodi as sultan.
- November 29 – Arthur Tudor is named Prince of Wales.
- December 11 – Jeannetto de Tassis is appointed Chief Master of Postal Services in Innsbruck; his descendants, the Thurn und Taxis Family, later run much of the postal system of Europe.

==== Date unknown ====
- Typhus first appears in Europe, during the Siege of Baza in the Granada War.
- A gold coin equal to one pound sterling, called a sovereign, is issued for Henry VII of England.
- King Henry VII of England gives a town charter to the port of Southwold.
- Lucas Watzenrode becomes bishop of Warmia.
- Johannes Widmann publishes his mercantile arithmetic Behende und hüpsche Rechenung auff allen Kauffmanschafft in Leipzig, containing the first printed use of plus and minus signs, to indicate trading surpluses or shortages.

== Significant people ==
- Robert Henryson

== Births ==
1480

- January 10 – Margaret of Austria, Regent of the Netherlands (d. 1530)
- February 12 – Frederick II of Legnica, Duke of Legnica from 1488 (until 1495 and 1505 with his brothers) (d. 1547)
- February 13 – Girolamo Aleandro, Italian Catholic cardinal (d. 1542)
- April 10 – Philibert II, Duke of Savoy (d. 1504)
- April 18 – Lucrezia Borgia, Duchess of Ferrara (d. 1519)
- June 1 – Tiedemann Giese, Catholic bishop from Danzig (Gdańsk) in Poland (d. 1550)
- July 5 – Philip of the Palatinate, Bishop of Freising and Naumburg (d. 1541)
- November 10 – Bridget of York, English nun (d. 1517)
- October – Saint Cajetan, founder of the Theatines (d. 1547)
- date unknown
  - Vannoccio Biringuccio, Italian metallurgist (d. 1539)
  - Claude Garamond, French publisher (d. 1561)
  - Giovanni Guidiccioni, Italian poet (d. 1541)
  - Ferdinand Magellan, Portuguese explorer (d. 1521)
  - Jerzy Radziwiłł, Polish nobleman (d. 1541)
  - Gazi Husrev-beg, Ottoman statesmen (d. 1541)
  - Palma il Vecchio, Italian painter (d. 1528)
- probable
  - Arasibo, Taino Cacique
  - Hans Baldung, German painter (d. 1545)
  - Matteo Bandello, Italian novelist (d. 1562)
  - Johann Georg Faust, German alchemist (d. 1540)
  - Anna Taskomakare, Swedish merchant craftswoman and estate owner (d. after 1528)
  - Jumacao, Taino Cacique
  - Conn O'Neill, 1st Earl of Tyrone (d. 1559)
  - Marcantonio Raimondi, Italian engraver (d. c. 1534)
  - Elizabeth Boleyn, Countess of Wiltshire (d. 1538)

1481

- January 15 – Ashikaga Yoshizumi, Japanese shōgun (d. 1511)
- March 2 – Franz von Sickingen, German knight (d. 1523)
- March 7 – Baldassare Peruzzi, Italian architect and painter (d. 1536)
- May 3 – Juana de la Cruz Vázquez Gutiérrez, Spanish abbess of the Franciscan Third Order Regular (d. 1534)
- May 14 – Ruprecht of the Palatinate, German bishop (d. 1504)
- July 1 – King Christian II of Denmark, Scandinavian monarch under the Kalmar Union (d. 1559)
- August 21 – Jorge de Lencastre, Duke of Coimbra (d. 1550)
- August 28 – Francisco de Sá de Miranda, Portuguese poet (d. 1558)
- November 11 – Christoph von Scheurl, German writer (d. 1542)
- December 18 – Sophie of Mecklenburg, Duchess of Mecklenburg, Duchess of Saxony (d. 1503)
- December 27 – Casimir, Margrave of Brandenburg-Bayreuth, Margrave of Bayreuth (d. 1527)
- date unknown
  - Yan Song, Chinese prime minister (d. 1568)
  - Antonio de Guevara, Spanish chronicler and moralist (d. 1545)
  - Imperia La Divina, Roman courtesan (d. 1512)

1482

- March 7 – Fray Thomas de San Martín, Roman Catholic prelate and bishop (d. 1555)
- June 29 – Maria of Aragon, Queen of Manuel I of Portugal, daughter of Ferdinand II of Aragon and Isabella I of Castile (d. 1517)
- July 7 – Andrzej Krzycki, Polish archbishop (d. 1537)
- August 23 – Jo Gwang-jo, Korean philosopher (d. 1520)
- October 7 – Ernest, Margrave of Baden-Durlach (d. 1553)
- October 18 – Philipp III, Count of Hanau-Lichtenberg (d. 1538)
- December 9 – Frederick II, Elector Palatine (1544–1556) (d. 1556)
- date unknown
  - Richard Aertsz, Dutch historical painter (d. 1577)
  - Eufrasia Burlamacchi, Italian nun and manuscript illumination artist (d. 1548)
  - Leo Jud, Swiss religious reformer (d. 1542)
  - Johannes Oecolampadius, German religious reformer (d. 1531)
  - Matthias Ringmann, German cartographer and humanist poet (d. 1511)
- probable
  - Bernardino Luini, Italian painter (d. 1532)
  - Richard Pace, English diplomat (d. 1537)

1483

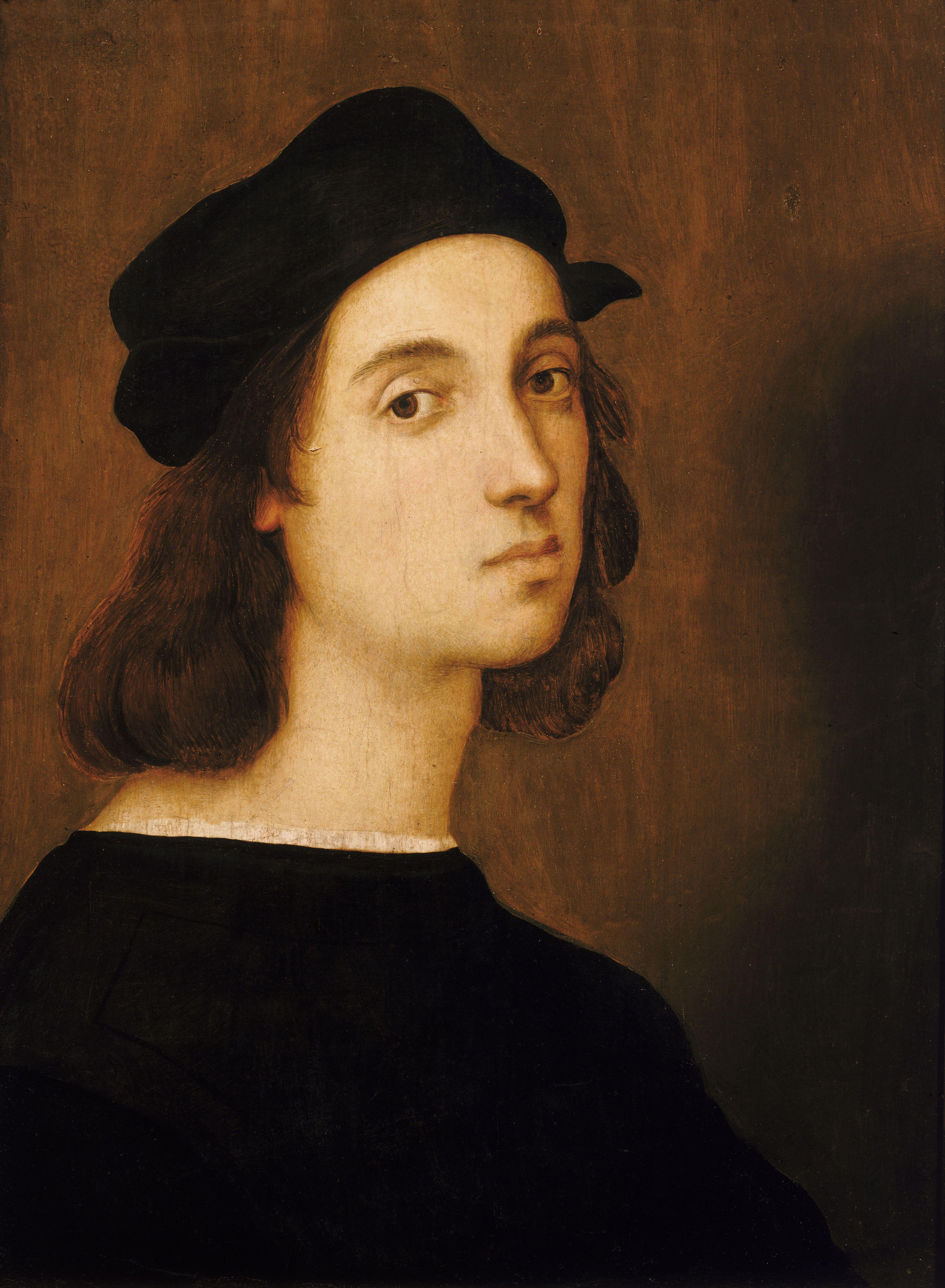
Raphael

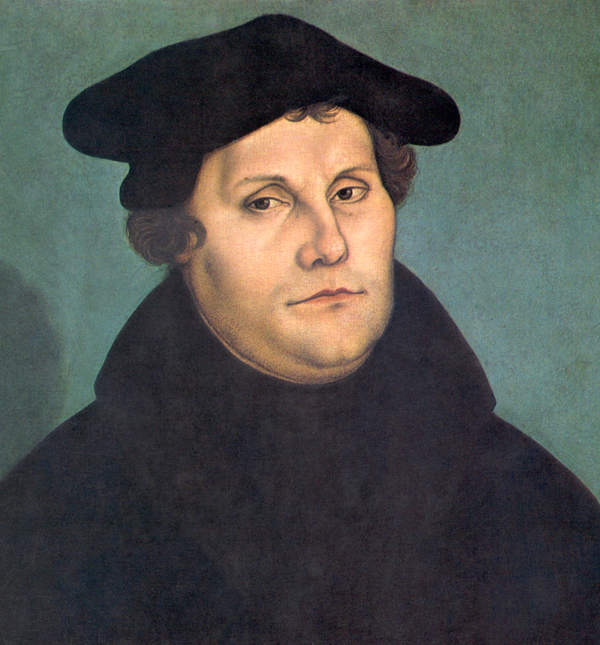
Martin Luther

- January 12 – Henry III of Nassau-Breda, Baron of Breda (d. 1538)
- February 14 – Zahir al-Din Mohammed Babur Shah, founder of the Moghul Dynasty (d. 1530)
- March 6 – Francesco Guicciardini, Italian historian and statesman (d. 1540)
- April 6 – Raphael, Italian painter and architect (d. 1520)
- April 19 – Paolo Giovio, Italian bishop (d. 1552)
- July 20 – Wang Gen, Chinese philosopher (d. 1541)
- September 3 – Eric II, Duke of Mecklenburg (d. 1508)
- October 16 – Gasparo Contarini, Italian diplomat and cardinal (d. 1542)
- October 26 – Hans Buchner, German Renaissance composer (d. 1538)
- November 10 – Martin Luther, German monk and Protestant reformer (d. 1546)
- November 16 – Elisabeth of the Palatinate, Landgravine of Hesse, German noble (d. 1522)
- December 3 – Nicolaus von Amsdorf, German theologian and Protestant reformer (d. 1565)
- date unknown
  - Thomas Parr, Englishman, alleged oldest living man (d. 1635)
  - Cacamatzin, Aztec ruler (d. 1520)
  - Jacquet of Mantua, French composer (d. 1559)
  - Chen Chun, Chinese painter (d. 1544)
  - Felice della Rovere, also known as Madonna Felice, the illegitimate daughter of Pope Julius II (d. 1536)

1484

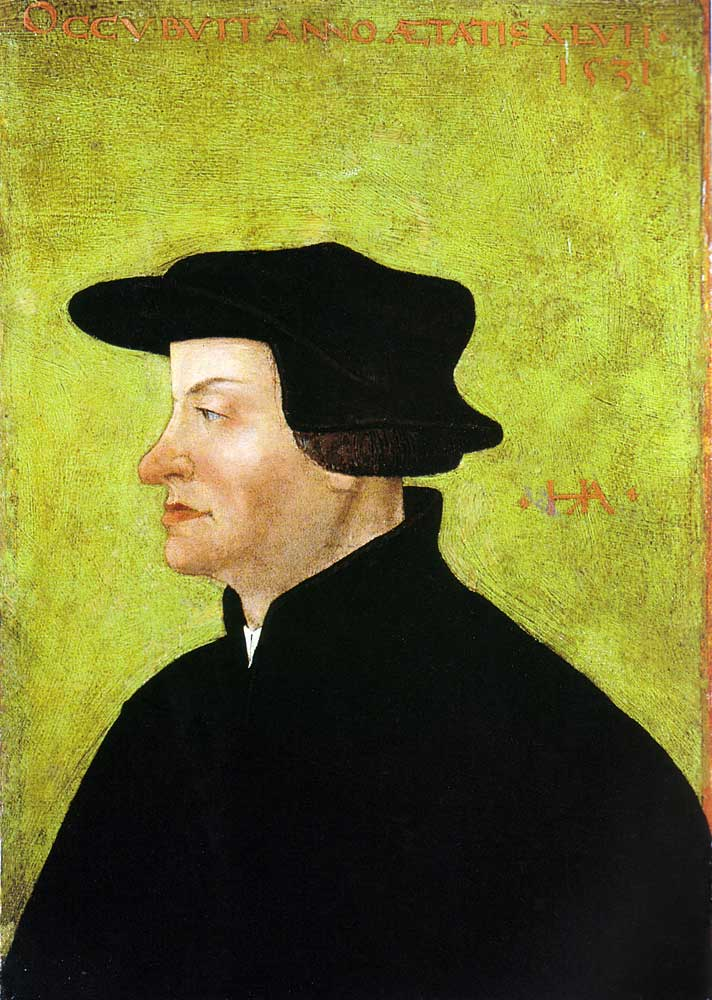
Huldrych Zwingli

- January 1 – Huldrych Zwingli, Swiss religious reformer (d. 1531)
- January 17 – George Spalatin, German religious reformer (d. 1545)
- February 21 – Joachim I Nestor, Elector of Brandenburg (1499–1535) (d. 1535)
- March 4 – George, Margrave of Brandenburg-Ansbach (d. 1543)
- April 12
  - Maharana Sangram Singh, Rana of Mewar (d. 1528)
  - Antonio da Sangallo the Younger, Italian architect (d. 1546)
- April 23 – Julius Caesar Scaliger, Italian humanist scholar (d. 1558)
- June 25 – Bartholomeus V. Welser, German banker (d. 1561)
- July 11 – Ottaviano de' Medici, Italian politician (d. 1546)
- November 29 – Joachim Vadian, Swiss humanist and reformer (d. 1551)
- December 13 – Paul Speratus, German Lutheran (d. 1551)
- date unknown – Hosokawa Takakuni, Japanese military commander (d. 1531)
- date unknown – Luisa de Medrano, Spanish scholar (d. 1527)
- date unknown – Purandara Dasa, Indian composer and saint (d. 1564)

1485

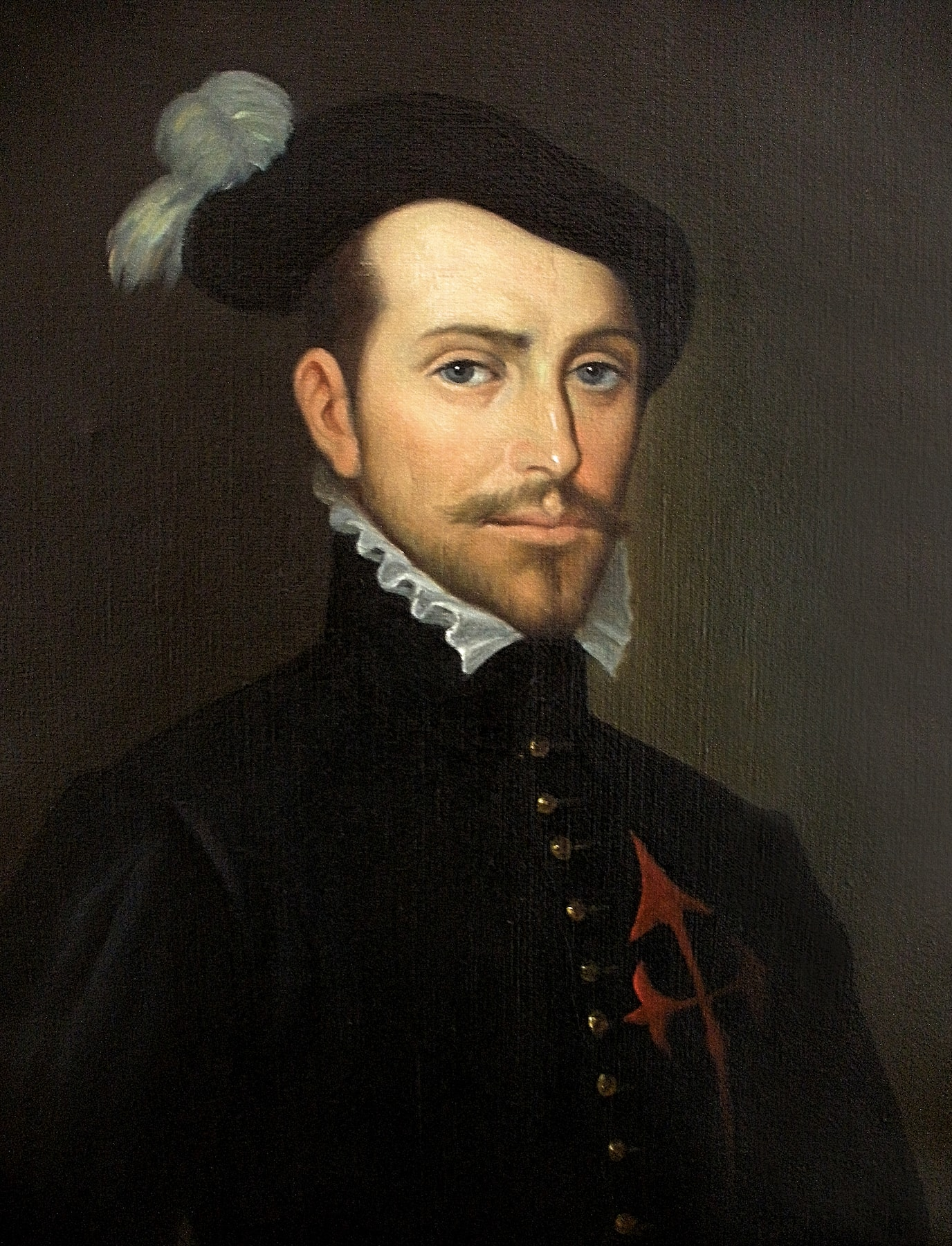
Hernán Cortés

- March 10 – Sophie of Brandenburg-Ansbach-Kulmbach, German princess (d. 1537)
- April 26 – Sibylle of Baden, Countess consort of Hanau-Lichtenberg (d. 1518)
- June 20 – Astorre III Manfredi, Italian noble (d. 1502)
- June 24
  - Johannes Bugenhagen, German religious reformer (d. 1558)
  - Elizabeth of Denmark, Electress of Brandenburg (1502–1535) (d. 1555)
- July 20 – Giovanni Battista Ramusio, Italian geographer (d. 1557)
- August 22 – Beatus Rhenanus, German humanist and religious reformer (d. 1547)
- September 14 – Anna of Mecklenburg-Schwerin, Mecklenburgian royal (d. 1525)
- October 1 – Johannes Dantiscus, Polish poet and bishop (d. 1548)
- October 8 – Antonio Pucci, Italian Catholic cardinal (d. 1544)
- November 30 – Veronica Gambara, Italian poet and stateswoman (d. 1550)
- December 16 – Catherine of Aragon, first queen of Henry VIII of England, and daughter of Ferdinand II of Aragon and Isabella I of Castile (d. 1536)
- date unknown
  - Hernán Cortés, Spanish conquistador (d. 1547)
  - Odet de Foix, Vicomte de Lautrec, French military leader (d. 1528)
  - Johanna of Hachberg-Sausenberg, ruler of Neuchatel (d. 1543)
  - Giovanni da Verrazzano, Italian explorer (approximate date; d. c. 1528)
- probable
  - Hugh Aston, English composer (d. 1558)
  - Thomas Cromwell, 1st Earl of Essex, English statesman (d. 1540)
  - Clément Janequin, French chanson composer
  - Sayyida al Hurra, Moroccan pirate queen
  - Sebastiano del Piombo, Italian painter (d. 1547)
  - John Russell, 1st Earl of Bedford, English royal minister (d. 1555)

1486

- January 6 – Martin Agricola, German Renaissance composer and music theorist (d. 1556)
- February 10 – George of the Palatinate, German nobleman; Bishop of Speyer (1513–1529) (d. 1529)
- February 18 – Chaitanya Mahaprabhu, Bengali ascetic and monk (d. 1534)
- July 2 – Jacopo Sansovino, Italian sculptor and architect (d. 1570)
- July 16 – Andrea del Sarto, Italian painter (d. 1530)
- July 25 – Albrecht VII, Duke of Mecklenburg (1503–1520), then Duke of Mecklenburg-Güstrow (1520–1547) (d. 1547)
- July 28 – Pieter Gillis, French philosopher (d. 1533)
- August 3 – Imperia Cognati, Italian courtesan (d. 1512)
- August 23 – Sigismund von Herberstein, Austrian diplomat and historian (d. 1566)
- September 14 – Heinrich Cornelius Agrippa, German astrologer and alchemist (d. 1535)
- September 20 – Arthur, Prince of Wales, son of Henry VII of England (d. 1502)
- October 10 – Charles III, Duke of Savoy (d. 1553)
- November 13 – Johann Eck, German Scholastic theologian and defender of Catholicism during the Protestant Reformation (d. 1543)
- December 9 – Philip III, Count of Waldeck-Eisenberg (1524–1539) (d. 1539)
- date unknown – Shimon Lavi, Sephardi kabbalist (d. 1585)
- probable
  - Colin Campbell, 3rd Earl of Argyll (d. 1535)
  - Gerolamo Emiliani, Venetian-born humanitarian, canonized (d. 1537)
  - Ludwig Senfl, Swiss composer (d. 1542 or 1543)

1487

- February 7 – Queen Dangyeong, Korean royal consort (d. 1557)
- February 8 – Ulrich, Duke of Württemberg (d. 1550)
- February 15 – Henry of the Palatinate, bishop of Utrecht (d. 1552)
- April 10 – William I, Count of Nassau-Siegen (d. 1559)
- July 5 – Johann Gramann, German theologian (d. 1541)
- July 17 – Ismail I, Shah of Persia (d. 1524)
- August 27 – Anna of Brandenburg, Duchess of Schleswig and Holstein (d. 1514)
- September 10 – Pope Julius III (d. 1555)
- October 5 – Ludwig of Hanau-Lichtenberg, German nobleman (d. 1553)
- November 14 – John III of Pernstein, Bohemian land-owner, Governor of Moravia and Count of Kladsko (d. 1548)
- date unknown
  - Amda Seyon II, Emperor of Ethiopia (d. 1494)
  - Magdalena de la Cruz, Franciscan nun of Cordova (d. 1560)
  - Fray Tomás de Berlanga, Bishop of Panama (d. 1551)
  - Piotr Gamrat, Polish Catholic archbishop (d. 1545)
  - Stanisław Kostka, Polish noble (d. 1555)
  - Pedro de Mendoza, Spanish conquistador (d. 1537)
  - Michael Stifel, German mathematician (d. 1567)
  - Giovanni da Udine, Italian painter (d. 1564)
  - Peter Vischer the Younger, German sculptor (d. 1528)

1488

- January 6 – Helius Eobanus Hessus, German Latin poet (d. 1540)
- January 20
  - John George, Marquis of Montferrat, Italian noble (d. 1533)
  - Sebastian Münster, German scholar, cartographer, and cosmographer (d. 1552)
- March 19 – Johannes Magnus, last Catholic Archbishop of Sweden (d. 1544)
- April 16 – Jungjong of Joseon (d. 1544)
- April 21 – Ulrich von Hutten, German religious reformer (d. 1523)
- May 1 – Sidonie of Bavaria, eldest daughter of Duke Albrecht IV of Bavaria-Munich (d. 1505)
- May 5 – Lê Uy Mục, 8th king of the later Lê dynasty of Vietnam (d. 1509)
- May 7 – John III of the Palatinate, Administrator of the Bishopric of Regensburg (d. 1538)
- June – Heinrich Glarean, Swiss music theorist (d. 1563)
- June 29 – Pedro Pacheco de Villena, Spanish Catholic cardinal (d. 1560)
- July 15 – Juan Álvarez de Toledo, Spanish Catholic cardinal (d. 1557)
- October 17 – Ursula of Brandenburg, Duchess consort of Mecklenburg-Schwerin (d. 1510)
- December 15 – Ferdinand, Duke of Calabria (d. 1550)
- date unknown
  - Rabbi Yosef Karo, Spanish Jewish scholar (d. 1575)
  - Oswald Myconius, Swiss religious reformer (d. 1552)
  - Jan Tarnowski, Polish nobleman (d. 1561)
  - Thomas of Villanova, Spanish bishop (d. 1555)
  - Gustav Trolle, Archbishop of Uppsala (d. 1533)
  - Elisabeth of Nassau-Siegen, German noblewoman (d. 1559)
- probable
  - Thomas Audley, 1st Baron Audley of Walden, Lord Chancellor of England (d. 1544)
  - Guillaume Gouffier, seigneur de Bonnivet, French soldier (d. 1525)
  - Myles Coverdale, English Bible translator (d. 1568)
  - Lütfi Pasha, Ottoman statesman (d. 1564)

1489

- February 9 – Georg Hartmann, German instrument maker (d. 1564)
- June 2 – Charles, Duke of Vendôme, French noble (d. 1537)
- June 4 – Antoine, Duke of Lorraine (d. 1544)
- June 16 – Sibylle of Bavaria, Electress Palatine consort (d. 1519)
- June 23 – Charles II, Duke of Savoy, Italian sovereign (d. 1496)
- July 2 – Thomas Cranmer, Archbishop of Canterbury (d. 1556)
- August – Antonio da Correggio, Italian painter (d. 1534)
- August 10 – Jacob Sturm von Sturmeck, German statesman and reformer (d. 1553)
- November 10 – Henry V, Duke of Brunswick-Lüneburg and Prince of Wolfenbüttel 1514–1568 (d. 1568)
- November 28 – Margaret Tudor, Scottish regent, Queen of James IV of Scotland, daughter of Henry VII of England (d. 1541)
- December 10 – Gaston of Foix, Duke of Nemours (d. 1512)
- date unknown
  - Gerónimo de Aguilar, Spanish Franciscan friar, participant in the Spanish conquest of the Aztec Empire (d. 1531)
  - William Farel, French evangelist (d. 1565)
  - Francesco Ferruccio, Florentine captain (k. 1530)
  - Hosokawa Sumimoto, Japanese warlord (d. 1520)
  - Margareta von Melen, Swedish noblewoman (d. 1541)
  - Tsukahara Bokuden, Japanese swordsman (d. 1571)
- probable
  - Juan de Grijalva, Spanish conquistador (d. 1527)
  - Thomas Müntzer, German pastor and rebel leader (d. 1525)

== Deaths ==
1480

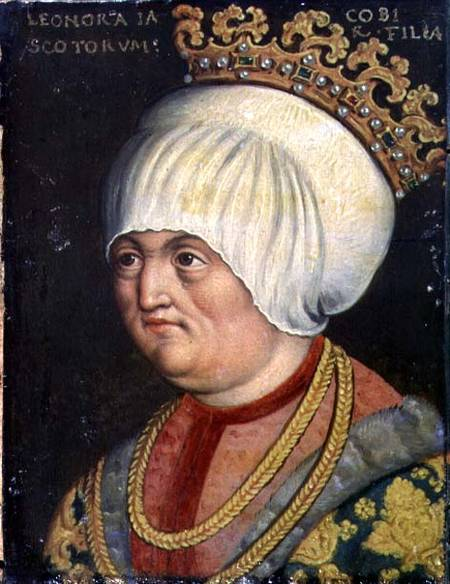
Eleanor of Scotland died 20 November

- January 5 – Jakobus, nobleman from Lichtenberg in the northern part of Alsace (b. 1416)
- April 14 – Thomas de Spens, Scottish statesman and prelate (b. c. 1415)
- May 10 – Philipp I, Count of Hanau-Lichtenberg (1458–1480) (b. 1417)
- May 19 – Jan Długosz, Polish historian (b. 1415)
- May 25 – William III, Count of Henneberg-Schleusingen (b. 1434)
- June 6 – Vecchietta, Italian painter, sculptor and architect (b. c. 1410)
- July 6 – Antonio Squarcialupi, Italian composer (b. 1416)
- July 10 – René of Anjou, king of Naples (b. 1409)
- July 15 – John III, Count of Nassau-Weilburg, German nobleman (b. 1441)
- July 26 – Ruprecht of the Palatinate, Archbishop and Prince Elector of Cologne (b. 1427)
- September 1 – Ulrich V, Count of Württemberg (b. 1413)
- October 4 – Jakub of Sienno, medieval Bishop Kraków in the years 1461–1463 (b. 1413)
- October 18 – Uhwudong, Korean dancer (b. 1440)
- November 20 – Eleanor of Scotland, Scottish princess (b. 1433)
- November 29 – Frederick I, Count Palatine of Simmern (b. 1417)
- December 14 – Niccolò Perotti, Italian humanist scholar (b. 1429)
- date unknown
  - Nicolas Jenson, French engraver (b. 1420)
  - Tristão Vaz Teixeira, Portuguese explorer (b. c. 1395)
  - Antonio Vivarini, Italian painter (b. c. 1440)
  - Joana de Castre, Catalan noble (b. 1430)

1481

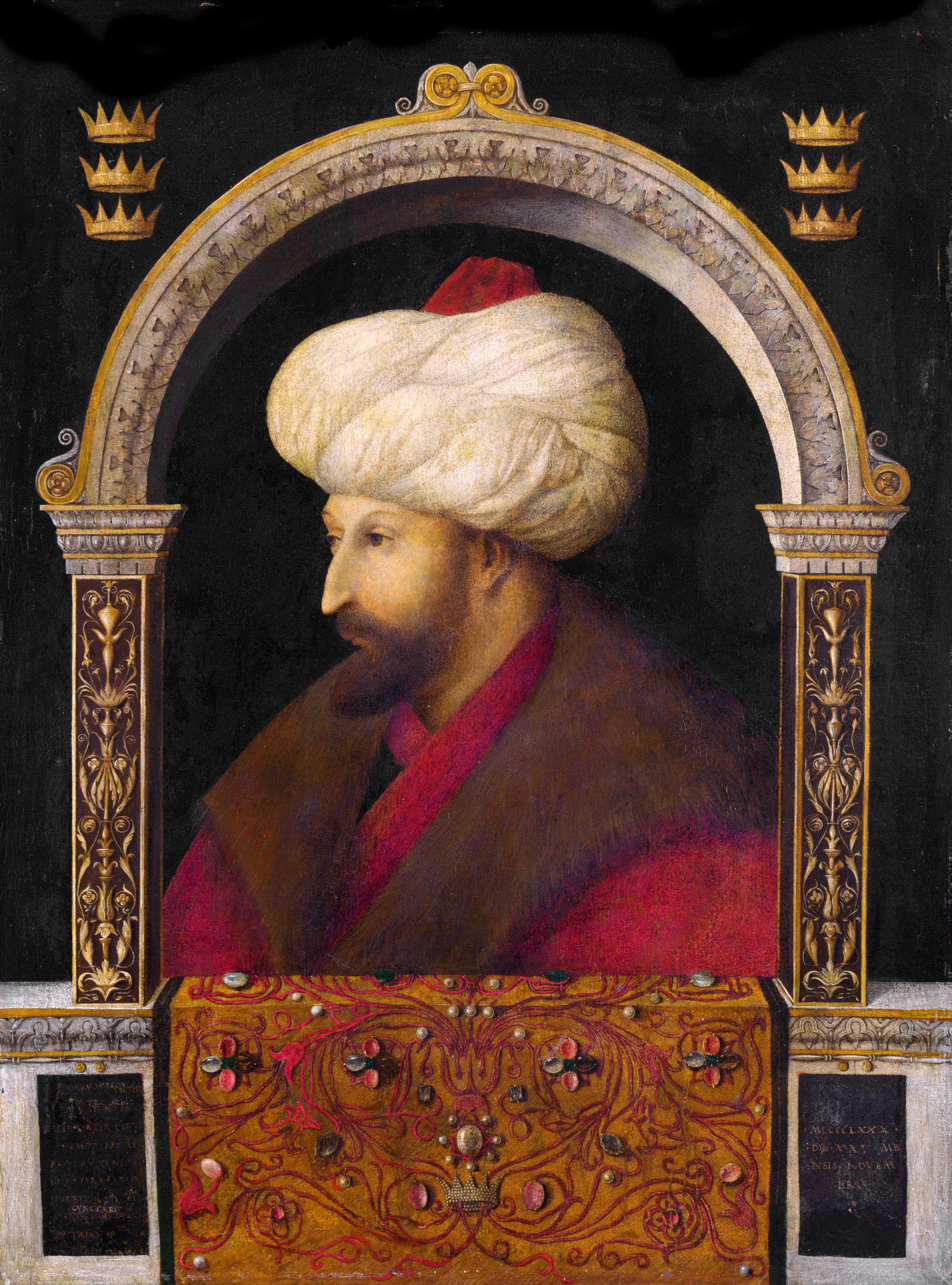
Mehmed II, the Conqueror

- January 6 – Akhmat Khan, khan of the Great Horde
- April 30 – Ichijō Kaneyoshi, Japanese court noble (b. 1402)
- May 3 – Mehmed II, Ottoman Sultan (b. 1432)
- May – Karamanlı Mehmet Pasha, Ottoman (Turkish) grand vizier
- May 21 – King Christian I of Denmark and Norway (b. 1426)
- August 23 – Thomas de Littleton, English judge and legal author (b. c. 1407)
- August 28 – King Afonso V of Portugal (b. 1432)
- September 3 – Amalie of Brandenburg, Countess Palatine and Duchess of Zweibruecken and Veldenz (b. 1461)
- September 5 – John I, Duke of Cleves (b. 1419)
- November 19 – Anne de Mowbray, 8th Countess of Norfolk (b. 1472)
- date unknown
  - Axayacatl, Aztec ruler of Tenochtitlan (b. c. 1449)
  - Charles IV, Duke of Anjou, titular King of Naples (b. 1436)
  - Jean Fouquet, French painter (b. 1420)
  - Ikkyu, Japanese Zen Buddhist priest and poet (b. 1394)
  - Mary Woodville, English noblewoman (b. c. 1454)
  - Erik Axelsson Tott, regent of Sweden (b. 1415)

1482

- March 25 – Lucrezia Tornabuoni, Italian writer, adviser and spouse of Piero di Cosimo de' Medici (b. 1427)
- March 27 – Mary of Burgundy, Sovereign Duchess regnant of Burgundy, married to Maximilian I, Holy Roman Emperor (b. 1457)
- May 10 – Paolo dal Pozzo Toscanelli, Italian mathematician and astronomer (b. 1397)
- May 23 – Mary of York, daughter of King Edward IV of England (b. 1467)
- August 15 – William, Margrave of Hachberg-Sausenberg, Margrave of Hachberg-Sausenberg (1428-1441) (b. 1406)
- August 25 – Queen Margaret of Anjou, wife of Henry VI of England (b. 1430)
- August 29 – Queen Yun, Korean Queen (b. 1455)
- September 10 – Federico da Montefeltro, Italian mercenary (b. 1422)
- September 17 – William III, Landgrave of Thuringia, Duke of Luxembourg (b. 1425)
- September 22 – Philibert I, Duke of Savoy (b. 1465)
- date unknown – Hugo van der Goes, Flemish artist (b. c. 1440)

1483

- January 19 – William IV, Lord of Egmont, IJsselstein, Schoonderwoerd and Haastrecht and Stadtholder of Guelders (b. 1412)
- February 27 – William VIII, Marquess of Montferrat (b. 1420)
- March 23 – Yolande, Duchess of Lorraine (b. 1428)
- April 4 – Henry Bourchier, 1st Earl of Essex (b. c. 1405)
- April 9 – King Edward IV of England (b. 1442)
- April 24 – Margaret of Bourbon, French noble (b. 1438)
- May 4 – George Neville, Duke of Bedford, English dispossessed nobleman (b. 1465)
- May 6 – Queen Jeonghui, Korean regent (b. 1418)
- June 13 – William Hastings, 1st Baron Hastings (executed; b. 1431)
- June 25
  - Anthony Woodville, 2nd Earl Rivers (executed; b. 1442)
  - Richard Grey, English knight, half brother of Edward V (executed; b. 1457)
- July 4 – Costanzo I Sforza, Italian condottiero (b. 1447)
- August 30 – King Louis XI of France (b. 1423)
- November 2 – Henry Stafford, 2nd Duke of Buckingham, English politician (b. 1454)
- December 1 – Charlotte of Savoy, French queen (b. 1441)
- date unknown
  - Edmund Sutton, English nobleman (b. 1425)
  - Elise Eskilsdotter, Norwegian noblewoman and pirate

1484

- March 4 – Saint Casimir, Prince of Poland (b. 1458)
- March 5 – Elisabeth of Bavaria, Electress of Saxony (b. 1443)
- April 9 – Edward of Middleham, Prince of Wales (b. c. 1473)
- May 1 – Adalbert of Saxony, Administrator of Mainz (1482–1484) (b. 1467)
- July 11 – Mino da Fiesole, Italian sculptor (b. c. 1429)
- July 14 – Federico I Gonzaga, Marquess of Mantua (1478–1484) (b. 1441)
- August 12 – Pope Sixtus IV (b. 1414)
- August 20 – Ippolita Maria Sforza, Italian noble (b. 1446)
- October 2 – Isabel of Cambridge, Countess of Essex (b. 1409)
- December – Premislav of Tost, Silesian ruler (b. 1425)
- date unknown
  - William Sinclair, 1st Earl of Caithness (b. 1410)
  - Luigi Pulci, Italian poet (b. 1432)
  - Barbara von Ottenheim, German sculpture model (b. 1430)

1485

- January 20 – Eustochia Smeralda Calafato, Italian saint (b. 1434)
- February 28 – Niclas, Graf von Abensberg, German soldier (b. 1441)
- March 16 – Anne Neville, queen of Richard III of England (b. 1456)
- August 7 – Alexander Stewart, 1st Duke of Albany, Scottish prince (b. c. 1454)
- August 15 – Albert II, Duke of Brunswick-Grubenhagen (b. 1419)
- August 22 (killed in the Battle of Bosworth Field):
  - King Richard III of England (b. 1452)
  - John Howard, 1st Duke of Norfolk (b. 1430)
  - James Harrington, Yorkist knight
  - Richard Ratcliffe, supporter of Richard III
  - John Babington, High Sheriff of Nottinghamshire, Derbyshire and the Royal Forests
  - Robert Brackenbury, English nobleman, courtier and supporter of Richard III
  - Walter Devereux, 8th Baron Ferrers of Chartley, supporter of Richard III
  - William Brandon, supporter of Henry VII (b. 1456)
- August 25 – William Catesby, supporter of Richard III (executed) (b. 1450)
- October 17 – John Scott of Scott's Hall, Warden of the Cinque Ports
- October 27 – Rodolphus Agricola, Dutch scholar (b. 1443)
- November 4 – Françoise d'Amboise, Duchess of Brittany (b. 1427)
- November 4 – Giovanni Mocenigo, Doge of Venice (b. 1408)
- Date unknown – Kristina Königsmarck, Swedish noblewoman.

1486

- January 30 – Jacques of Savoy, Count of Romont, Prince of Savoy (b. 1450)
- March 11 – Albrecht III Achilles, Elector of Brandenburg (b. 1414)
- March 30 – Thomas Bourchier, Archbishop of Canterbury and Lord Chancellor of England (b. c. 1404)
- May – Louis I, Count of Montpensier (b. 1405)
- July 14 – Margaret of Denmark, Scottish queen consort, daughter of Christian I of Denmark (b. 1456)
- August (day unknown) – Marco Barbarigo, the 73rd Doge of Venice, was said to have died in a dispute caused by his brother and successor, Agostino Barbarigo.
- August 3 – Asakura Ujikage, 8th head of the Japanese Asakura clan (b. 1449)
- August 11 – William Waynflete, English Lord Chancellor and bishop of Winchester (b. c. 1398)
- August 26 – Ernest, Elector of Saxony, progenitor of the Ernestine Wettins (b. 1441)
- September 2 – Guy XIV de Laval, French noble (b. 1406)
- September 19 – Richard Oldham, English Catholic bishop
- date unknown
  - Tízoc, Aztec ruler of Tenochtitlan (perhaps poisoned)
  - Souvanna Banlang, Lan Xang king (b. 1455)
- probable – Aristotile Fioravanti, Italian architect and engineer (b. 1415)

1487

- March 21 – Nicholas of Flüe, Swiss hermit and saint (b. 1417)
- May 27 – Tilokaraj, king of Lan Na (b. 1409)
- June 16 – John de la Pole, 1st Earl of Lincoln (b. c. 1463)
- June 26 – John Argyropoulos, Greek philosopher
- July 16 – Charlotte, Queen of Cyprus (b. 1436)
- August 23 – Maria of Cleves, French noble (b. 1426)
- September 9 – Chenghua Emperor of China (b. 1447)
- September 14 – Mara Branković, Serbian princess (b. 1416)
- September 30 – John Sutton, 1st Baron Dudley, Lord Lieutenant of Ireland (b. 1400)
- October 22 – Antonio Bettini, Italian religious writer (b. 1396)
- date unknown
  - William FitzAlan, 16th Earl of Arundel (b. 1417)
  - Tlacaelel, high priest of Tenochtitlán (b. 1398)

1488

- April 1 – John II, Duke of Bourbon (b. 1426)
- April 14 – Girolamo Riario, Lord of Imola and Forli (b. 1443)
- May 9 – Frederick I of Liegnitz, Duke of Chojnów and Strzelin from 1453 (b. 1446)
- May 26 – Iizasa Ienao, Japanese swordsman (b. c. 1387)
- June 11 – King James III of Scotland (at the Battle of Sauchieburn; b. c. 1451)
- July 18 – Alvise Cadamosto, Italian explorer (b. 1432)
- July 28 – Edward Woodville, Lord Scales (at the Battle of St. Aubin-du-Cormier; b. c. 1456)
- July 30 – Clarice Orsini, Florentine noblewoman and wife of Lorenzo de’ Medici (b. 1453)
- September – Abu 'Amr 'Uthman, Hafsid caliph of Ifriqiya (b. 1419)
- September – Lasse Huittinen, Finnish thief
- September 9 – Francis II, Duke of Brittany (fell from a horse) (b. 1433)
- September 13 – Charles II, Duke of Bourbon (b. 1434)
- October 11 – Geoffroy Cœur, French nobleman, son of Jacques Cœur
- date unknown
  - Mary Stewart, Countess of Arran (b. 1453)
  - Andrea del Verrocchio, Italian sculptor (b. c. 1435)
  - Borommatrailokkanat, Ayutthaya king (b. 1431)

1489

- January 3 – Martin Truchseß von Wetzhausen, Grand Master of the Teutonic Knights (b. 1435)
- February 14 – Nicolaus von Tüngen, bishop of Warmia
- March 27 – Gilbert Kennedy, 1st Lord Kennedy, Scottish noble (b. 1405)
- April 6 – Jodha of Mandore, Ruler of Marwar (b. 1416)
- April 26 – Ashikaga Yoshihisa, Japanese shōgun (b. 1465)
- April 28 – Henry Percy, 4th Earl of Northumberland (b. c. 1449)
- May 3 – Stanisław Kazimierczyk, Polish canon regular and saint (b. 1433)
- May 21 – Henry V of Rosenberg, Bohemian nobleman (b. 1456)
- July 12 – Bahlul Lodi, sultan of Delhi
- July 19 – Louis I, Count Palatine of Zweibrücken (b. 1424)
- date unknown
  - Gerontius, Metropolitan of Moscow, Russian bishop
  - María de Ajofrín, Spanish visionary (b. 1455)
  - Girindrawardhana, ruler of Majapahit
