= 1484 =

1484 in various calendars
- Gregorian calendar: 1484; MCDLXXXIV
- Ab urbe condita: 2237
- Armenian calendar: 933; ԹՎ ՋԼԳ
- Assyrian calendar: 6234
- Balinese saka calendar: 1405–1406
- Bengali calendar: 890–891
- Berber calendar: 2434
- English Regnal year: 1 Ric. 3 – 2 Ric. 3
- Buddhist calendar: 2028
- Burmese calendar: 846
- Byzantine calendar: 6992–6993
- Chinese calendar: 癸卯年 (Water Rabbit); 4181 or 3974 — to — 甲辰年 (Wood Dragon); 4182 or 3975
- Coptic calendar: 1200–1201
- Discordian calendar: 2650
- Ethiopian calendar: 1476–1477
- Hebrew calendar: 5244–5245
- Hindu calendars
- Vikram Samvat: 1540–1541
- Shaka Samvat: 1405–1406
- Kali Yuga: 4584–4585
- Holocene calendar: 11484
- Igbo calendar: 484–485
- Iranian calendar: 862–863
- Islamic calendar: 888–889
- Japanese calendar: Bunmei 16 (文明１６年)
- Javanese calendar: 1400–1401
- Julian calendar: 1484; MCDLXXXIV
- Korean calendar: 3817
- Minguo calendar: 428 before ROC 民前428年
- Nanakshahi calendar: 16
- Thai solar calendar: 2026–2027
- Tibetan calendar: ཆུ་མོ་ཡོས་ལོ་ (female Water-Hare); 1610 or 1229 or 457 — to — ཤིང་ཕོ་འབྲུག་ལོ་ (male Wood-Dragon); 1611 or 1230 or 458

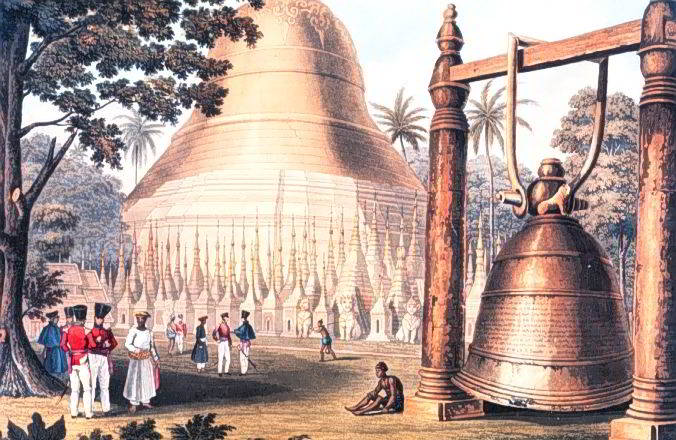
February 5: The Great Bell of Dhammazedi, the largest ever, is created in Myanmar.

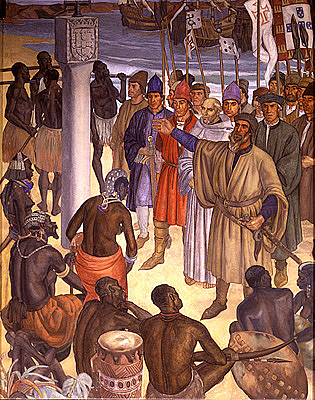
July 6: Portuguese explorer Diogo Cão reaches the mouth of the Congo River.

Year 1484 (MCDLXXXIV) was a leap year starting on Thursday of the Julian calendar, the 1484th year of the Common Era (CE) and Anno Domini (AD) designations, the 484th year of the 2nd millennium, the 84th year of the 15th century, and the 5th year of the 1480s decade.

== Events ==
=== January–March ===
- January 15 – In France, the Estates General, a consultative assembly of 855 delegates (285 apiece) representing the three economic classes — the First Estate (clergy), Second Estate (nobility) and— for the first time, the Third Estate (commoners, including peasants) is convened for the first time since 1468. The convening of the Estates General of 1484 at Tours has been ordered by Anne of France, the mother of and regent for the 13-year-old King Charles VIII since the death of King Louis XI, with the goal of designating the regent during Charles's minority. Although King Louis had designated Anne and her husband, Pierre de Beaujeu, to serve as regents, Louis, Duke of Orleans, the second cousin of the late King, seeks approval from the Estates General for the regency. The session of the Estates General becomes a call for reform of the laws of France.
- January 23 – King Richard III of England assembles his first, and only Parliament, opening a 29-day session.
- February 5 – The Great Bell of Dhammazedi, at 293.4 metric tons (323 U.S. tons) the largest bell ever created, is cast from bronze at Dagon in the Hanthawaddy kingdom (now Yangon in Myanmar) by order of King Dhammazedi. The casting comes despite advice from the royal astrologer that the date is inappropriate, and the bell is noted for its unpleasant tone. The bell will be stolen from the Shwedagon Pagoda in 1608 by Arakan mercenaries commanded by the Portuguese warlord Filipe de Brito e Nicote, but skin, into the Bago and Yangon Rivers while it is being transported on de Brito's ship.
- February 9 – At the Estates General, the nobleman Philippe Pot, representative of the Second Estate, delivers a famous speech calling upon reforms in the structure of government of France. His speech is successful in persuading the Estates to endorse the continuing regency of Anne and Pierre Beaujeu, but also leads to numerous recommendations for reform and alarms the royal government.
- February 20 – At the close of the English Parliament session, King Richard III gives royal assent to Titulus Regius ("under which title all the reasons to prove the King [Richard III] to be the true and undoubted heir to the crown, are set forth at larg... and ratified, and his brother [Edward IV]'s children [Edward V and Richard, Duke of York] made bastards," retroactive to January 23.
- February 22 – Pope John XIII of Alexandria begins a reign of 40 years as the partiarch of the Coptic Christian Church, filling a vacancy of five months since the death of Pope John XII.
- February 24 – King James III of Scotland gives royal assent to numerous acts passed by the Scottish Parliament, including the Defence of the Realm Act 1483 (summoning the members of the nobility to come defend Scotland); the Duke of Albany Act, an arrest warrant for all person who made treasonable assistance to the King's rebellious brother, Alexander, Duke of Albany; and the two Barratry Acts, prohibiting "the having of mone furth of the Realme" (the exportation of money out of the realm) to the Court of Rome.
- March 22 – The kingdoms of France and Scotland renew the Auld Alliance, with the Lord of Aubigny signing on behalf of France.
- March 26 – William Caxton, the first printer of books in English, prints his translation of Aesop's Fables in London.

=== April–June ===
- April 19 – Muhammad Shah Mir becomes the new Sultan of Kashmir in India, succeeding Hasan Khan.
- May 11 – The Kingdom of Hungary defeats the army of the Holy Roman Empire at the Battle of Leitzersdorf.
- May 30 – The coronation of the 13-year-old son of the late Louis XI, Charles the Affable, as King of France takes place at Reims.
- June 14 – Joanes III is proclaimed by his fiancée, Queen Katalina, to be her co-ruler of the Kingdom of Navarre at Pamplona, now part of the Basque region of Spain.
- June 22 – The first known book printed by a woman, Anna Rügerin, is an edition of Eike of Repgow's compendium of customary law, the Sachsenspiegel, produced in Augsburg.

=== July–September ===
- July 6 – Portuguese sea captain Diogo Cão finds the mouth of the Congo River.
- July 22 – Battle of Lochmaben Fair: A 500-man raiding party led by Alexander Stewart, Duke of Albany, and James Douglas, 9th Earl of Douglas, is defeated by forces loyal to Albany's brother James III of Scotland; Douglas is captured.
- August 7 – The Treaty of Bagnolo is signed, ending the War of Ferrara fought in Italy between the Republic of Venice and the Duchy of Ferrara after two years. Ferrara loses most of its territories which Venice had conquered north of the River Po, while Ferrara's Duke Ercole I d'Este regains his territories in Ariano nel Polesine, Corbola, Adria, Melara, Castelnovo Bariano and Ficarolo.
- August 29 – Giovanni Battista Cybo, Bishop of Santa Cecilia in Trastevere, is elected to succeed the late Pope Sixtus IV (who died on August 12) as the leader of the Roman Catholic Church, and takes the regnal name of Pope Innocent VIII as, the 213th pope.
- September 21 – Treaty of Nottingham: A three-year truce between the kingdoms of England and Scotland is signed.

=== October–December ===
- October 31 – The "White Elephant War", which had started in 1479 with the invasion of the Kingdom of Lan Xang (now Laos) by the Dai Viet Empire (now northern Vietnam) with the Vietnamese withdrawing their troops and failing to conquer the Laotians.
- November 23 – Louis, Duke of Orleans a contender for the French throne, signs a treaty with François II, Duke of Brittany, with an agreement for the marriage of the Duke's 7-year-old daughter, Anne of Brittany to Louis, with a goal of Louis having control of Brittany and of France. The proposed marriage, however, is contingent upon the annulment of Louis' existing marriage to Joan of France, Duchess of Berry.
- December 5 – Pope Innocent VIII issues the Papal bull Summis desiderantes affectibus, giving the Inquisition a mission to hunt heretics and witches in Germany, led by Heinrich Kramer and Jacob Sprenger.

=== Date unknown ===
- The first sugar mill becomes operational in the Gran Canaria.
- The first cuirassier units (kyrissers) are formed in Austria.
- The King of Portugal appoints a commission of mathematicians to perfect tables, to help seamen find their latitude.
- Maximilian I, Duke of Burgundy, orders foreign merchants to leave Bruges. Most merchants move to Antwerp, greatly contributing to its growth as an international trading center.

== Births ==
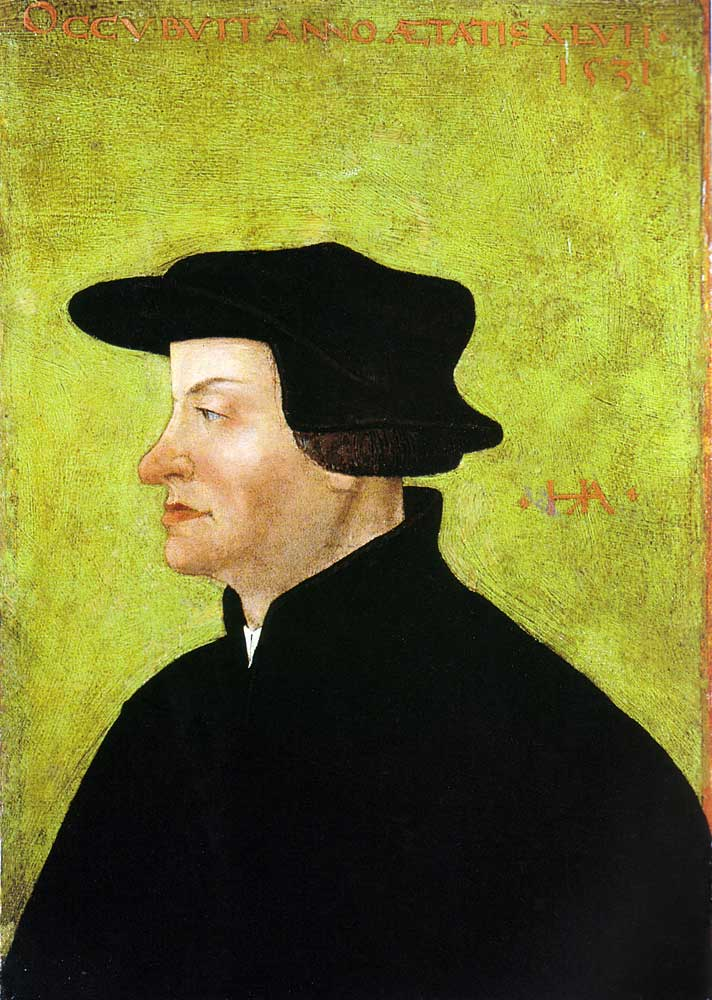
Huldrych Zwingli

- January 1 – Huldrych Zwingli, Swiss religious reformer (d. 1531)
- January 17 – George Spalatin, German religious reformer (d. 1545)
- February 21 – Joachim I Nestor, Elector of Brandenburg (1499–1535) (d. 1535)
- March 4 – George, Margrave of Brandenburg-Ansbach (d. 1543)
- April 12
  - Maharana Sangram Singh, Rana of Mewar (d. 1528)
  - Antonio da Sangallo the Younger, Italian architect (d. 1546)
- April 23 – Julius Caesar Scaliger, Italian humanist scholar (d. 1558)
- June 25 – Bartholomeus V. Welser, German banker (d. 1561)
- July 11 – Ottaviano de' Medici, Italian politician (d. 1546)
- November 29 – Joachim Vadian, Swiss humanist and reformer (d. 1551)
- December 13 – Paul Speratus, German Lutheran (d. 1551)
- date unknown – Hosokawa Takakuni, Japanese military commander (d. 1531)
- date unknown – Luisa de Medrano, Spanish scholar (d. 1527)

== Deaths ==
- March 4 – Saint Casimir, Prince of Poland (b. 1458)
- March 5 – Elisabeth of Bavaria, Electress of Saxony (b. 1443)
- April 9 – Edward of Middleham, Prince of Wales (b. c. 1473)
- May 1 – Adalbert of Saxony, Administrator of Mainz (1482–1484) (b. 1467)
- July 11 – Mino da Fiesole, Italian sculptor (b. c. 1429)
- July 14 – Federico I Gonzaga, Marquess of Mantua (1478–1484) (b. 1441)
- August 12 – Pope Sixtus IV (b. 1414)
- August 20 – Ippolita Maria Sforza, Italian noble (b. 1446)
- October 2 – Isabel of Cambridge, Countess of Essex (b. 1409)
- December – Premislav of Tost, Silesian ruler (b. 1425)
- date unknown
  - William Sinclair, 1st Earl of Caithness (b. 1410)
  - Luigi Pulci, Italian poet (b. 1432)
  - Barbara von Ottenheim, German sculpture model (b. 1430)
  - Aşıkpaşazade, Ottoman historian (b. 1400)
