= Kinship of Christ from Prunéřov =

16th-century linden wood relief

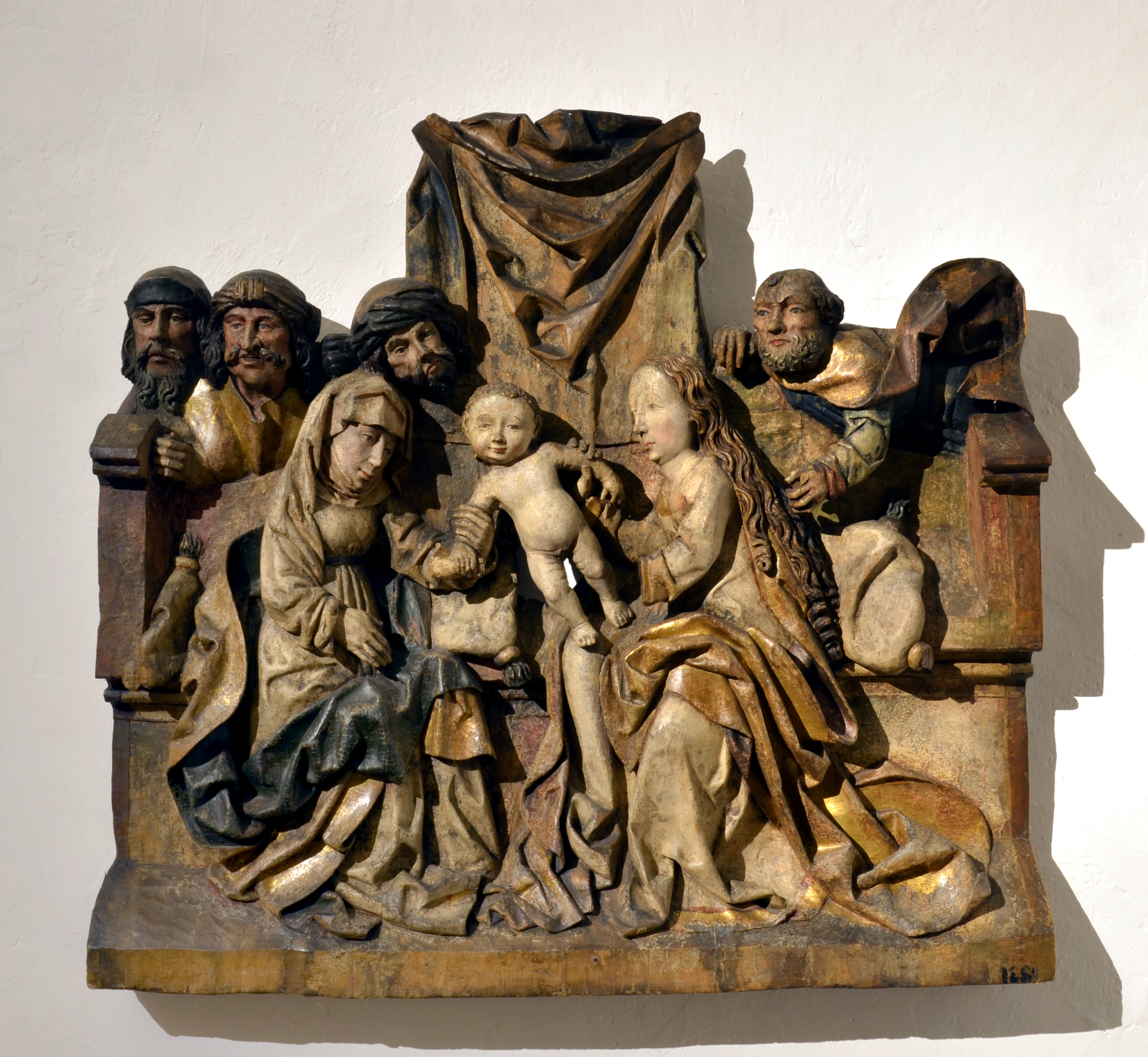
The Kinship of Christ from Prunéřov (1500–1510), Regional Museum in Chomutov

The Kinship of Christ from Prunéřov is a linden wood relief from the period 1500–1510. It is located in the permanent exhibition of the Regional Museum in Chomutov.

== History of the relief ==
The relief was found by Dr. Rudolf Hönigschmied, head of the German section of the State Heritage Institute, before 1920 in the rectory in Prunéřov. It is likely that it comes from the defunct parish church of St. Peter and Paul in Prunéřov, which was built in the 13th century and demolished in 1962–1966 due to coal mining. It was acquired in 1945 for the Municipal Museum in Kadan and since 1972 it has been in the collection of the Regional Museum in Chomutov (inventory number Plk 79).

== Description and classification ==
A polychrome relief made of linden wood, assembled longitudinally from three panels connected by clamps. Total dimensions are 83 × 90 × 12 centimetres. The work was restored in 1982 by Jiří Tesař, in 1998 by Jan Živný and in 2013 by Radomil Klouza. The proportions and dimensions of the relief correspond to its position in the centre of the altar retable.

In the centre of the scene is the seated St. Anne and the Virgin Mary with the Baby Jesus. The approaching male figures on the left are three of Anne's men - St. Joachim, St. Cleopas and Salomas and St. Joseph on the right. The usual iconographic arrangement that originated in the central Rhineland in the circle of Nicolaus Gerhaert van Leyden is here reduced to a depiction of the Holy Family, Anne and her three men, which was common in late medieval art. Albrecht Dürer's woodcut of 1511 in particular served as an iconographic type. A number of other depictions of Christ's family also include the other two daughters of St. Anne and their children.

According to Opitz, the carver worked in a distinctive way on suggestions made by Veit Stoss in the second period of his time in Nuremberg after his return from Cracow (1496). According to a more recent work, a comparison of the facial type of the Prunéřov Virgin Mary with the carving of the Throned Virgin Mary from the altar of the former Dominican monastery in Nuremberg (Germanisches Nationalmuseum Nürnberg) shows that the carver drew on an even older tradition of Nuremberg sculpture from 1490 to 1495. Consistencies can also be found in the dynamic concept of drapery and the shape of the curved rounded curves of Mary's mantle and the flowing robe of St Joseph.

The coincidence of the facial type and the slimness of the figures led Opitz to attribute the work to an anonymous carver known as the Master of the Virgin Mary. He was the author of the statue of the Virgin Mary on the altar of the Church of the Assumption in Maštov. According to more recent research, it is not possible to confirm a closer workshop relationship of the Prunéřov relief to any of the works mentioned by Opitz in the 1928 catalogue. It is assumed that it was created in the first decade of the 16th century in one of the city workshops in Kadaň, which adopted the then stylistic influences of Nuremberg sculpture from the late 15th century.

=== Other works ===
- The Mourning Virgin of Pieta, Marian Chapel in Herzogenaurach (1485–1490)
- Epitaph of Konrad Imhoff and his wife Katherine (1495), Fränkische Galerie Kronach
- Throned Virgin Mary, Rosary Altar from the Dominican Church in Nuremberg (1490–1495), Germanisches Nationalmuseum, Nuremberg
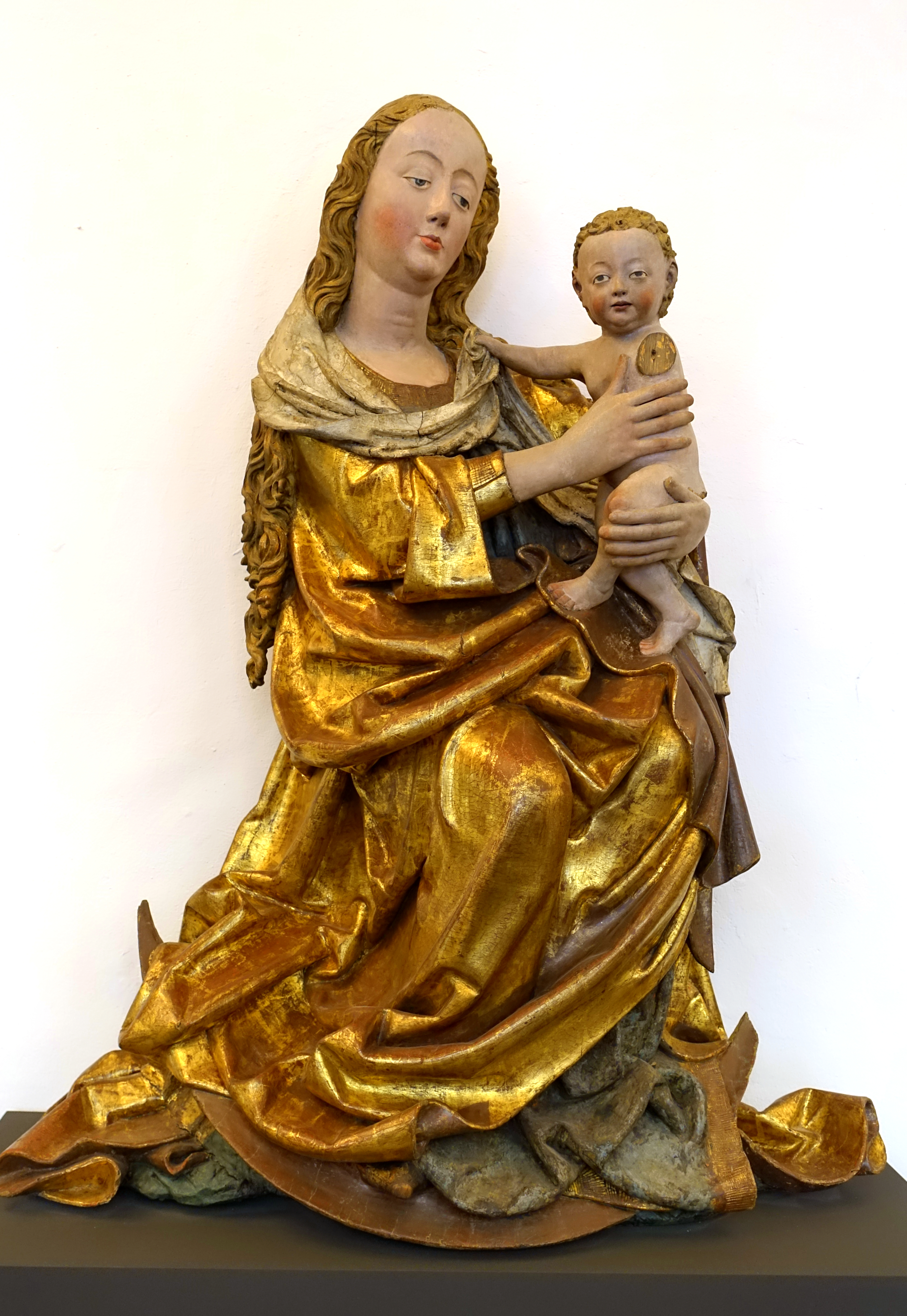
Virgin and Child on a crescent moon, from the Karmeliterklosterkirche St. Salvator, Nuremberg, c. 1485–1490, limewood - Germanisches Nationalmuseum - Nuremberg, Germany

== Sources ==
- Jan Klobušický, The Motif of the Holy Family in the Christian Tradition and its Application in Visual Art with Special Reference to the Czech Republic, master's thesis, Catholic Theological Faculty of Charles University, Prague, 2016
- Renáta Gubíková, in: Jan Klípa, Michaela Ottová (eds.), Without Borders. Art in the Erzgebirge between Gothic and Renaissance, National Gallery Prague 2015, ISBN 978-80-7035-583-1. p. 97
- Helena Dáňová, Renáta Gubíková (eds.), To all the world for comfort. Sculpture and painting in the Chomutov and Kadaň regions 1350–1590, 351 p., Regional Museum Chomutov 2014, ISBN 978-80-87898-07-9
- Jan Klobušický, The Motif of the Holy Family in the Christian Tradition and its Application in Visual Arts with Special Reference to the Czech Republic, 36 p., 2010, ISBN 978-80-254-8814-0
- Eva Šamšulová, Works of the Gothic Masters. Catalogue of the collection of Gothic sculptures and panel paintings of the District Museum in Chomutov, District Museum in Chomutov 1999
