= Nikolaus Gerhaert =

Dutch sculptor

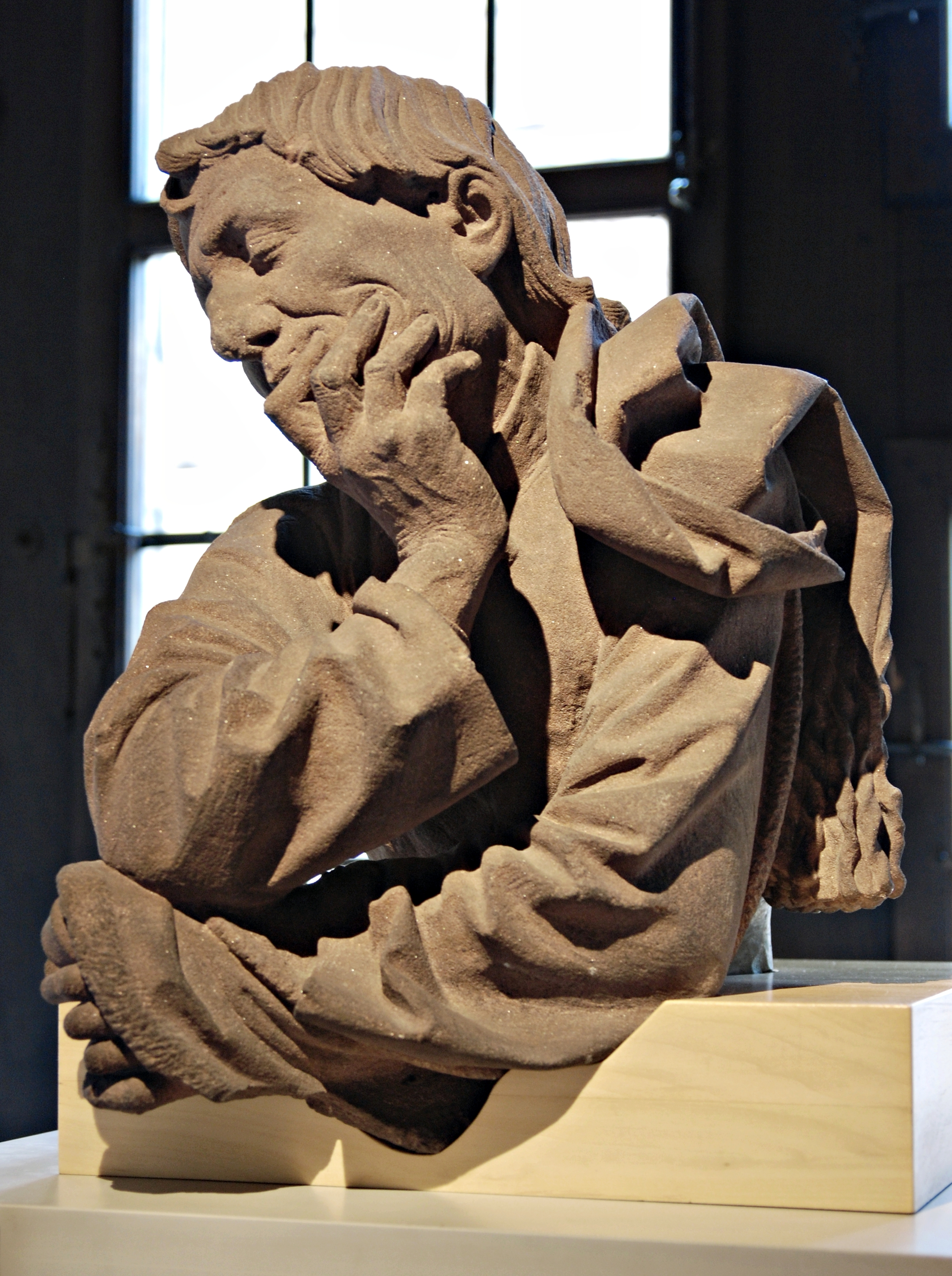
Man Meditating, an apparent self-portrait, c. 1465

Nikolaus Gerhaert (c.1420 – 28 June 1473), also known as Nikolaus Gerhaert van Leyden, was a Dutch sculptor, although aside from the works attributed to him, few details are known of his life. He worked in both stone and wood.

== Biography ==
Gerhaert is considered to be the most influential northern European sculptor of the 15th century. He was born in Leiden, Holland (present day Netherlands) sometime around 1420. Based on the location of his work, he spent most his working life in the Germanic Upper Rhine areas of Trier, Straßburg, Baden, Konstanz, and Austrian Vienna in his last years. Much of his documented work is lost to history, but what has survived is characterized by elaborate drapery and extreme physical realism, both extraordinarily vivid and unconventional. His specialties were tombs, altarpieces and other religious pieces. Sandstone and limestone are among his most frequent mediums.

One of his most well known works currently resides in the Musée de l’Œuvre Notre-Dame in Strasbourg (Alsace, present day France). Called the Buste d'homme accoudé (c. 1465), it is an undisputed masterpiece, and is believed to be a self-portrait. Gerhaert died on 28 June 1473 in Wiener Neustadt (present day Austria) while working on the tomb of Emperor Frederick III. Nicolaus Gerhaert was summoned to the imperial court to create this tomb after the death of Empress Eleanor of Portugal. The tomb was completed in 1513.

== Works ==
Public works attributed to Nicolaus Gerhaert are the following:

In Germany

- Baden-Baden, parish church: Crucifix of Baden-Baden, 1467
- Berlin, Bode Museum:
  - Virgin and Child Known as the Dangolsheim Madonna, walnut with traces of original painting, c. 1460/65 (7055)
  - Virgin and Child, limewood, c. 1465 (2240)
  - Saint Anne with Virgin and Child (Anna Selbtritt), sandstone, c. 1475 (5898)
- Frankfurt, Liebieghaus: Two heads, a Prophet and a Sibyl, fragments from the portal of the Strasbourg chancellery
- Trier, Museum am Dom: Tomb of Archbishop Jakob von Sierck, 1462

In Austria

- Vienna, Stephansdom: Tomb of Emperor Frederick III

In France

- Strasbourg, Cathedral, chapel on the left side of the choir: Epitaph of Canon Conrad of Bussnang, 1464
- Strasbourg, Musée de l'Œuvre Notre-Dame:
  - Head of an Ottoman with Turban, c. 1464
  - Meditating Man (Buste d'homme accoudé), red sandstone, before 1467, the presumed self-portrait

In the United States

- New York, Metropolitan Museum of Art:
  - Standing Virgin and Child, circa 1470
  - Reliquary Busts of Saint Catherine of Alexandria and Saint Barbara, attributed to his workshop, walnut, painted and gilded (on limewood base), c. 1465, 17.190.1734 and 17.190.1735, associated with the figure in Chicago as part of a dispersed high altar in Wissembourg
- Chicago, Art Institute of Chicago: Saint Margaret of Antioch (attributed), walnut with traces of polychromy, c. 1465

== Gallery ==
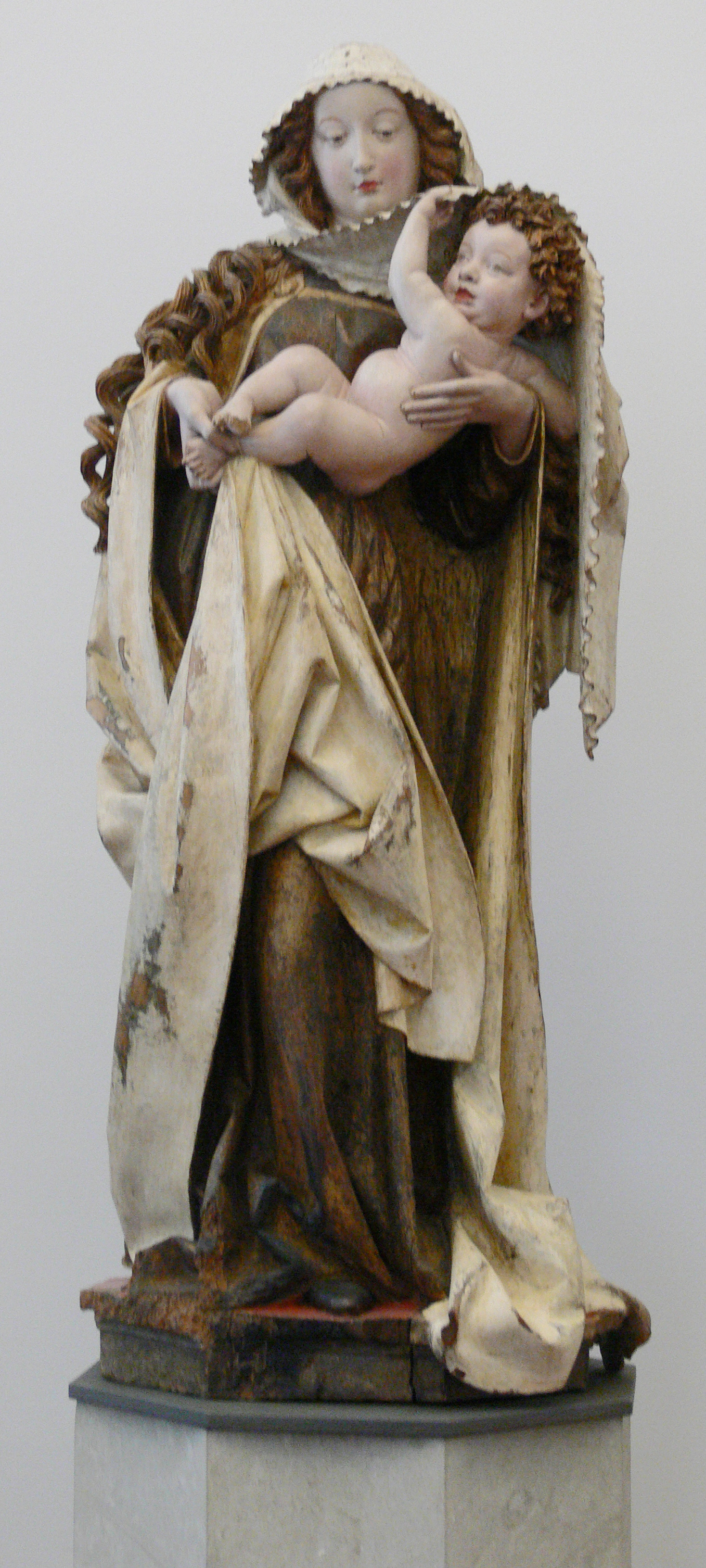
Dangolsheim Madonna (attributed), Strasbourg, c. 1460/65 (Bode-Museum, Berlin)

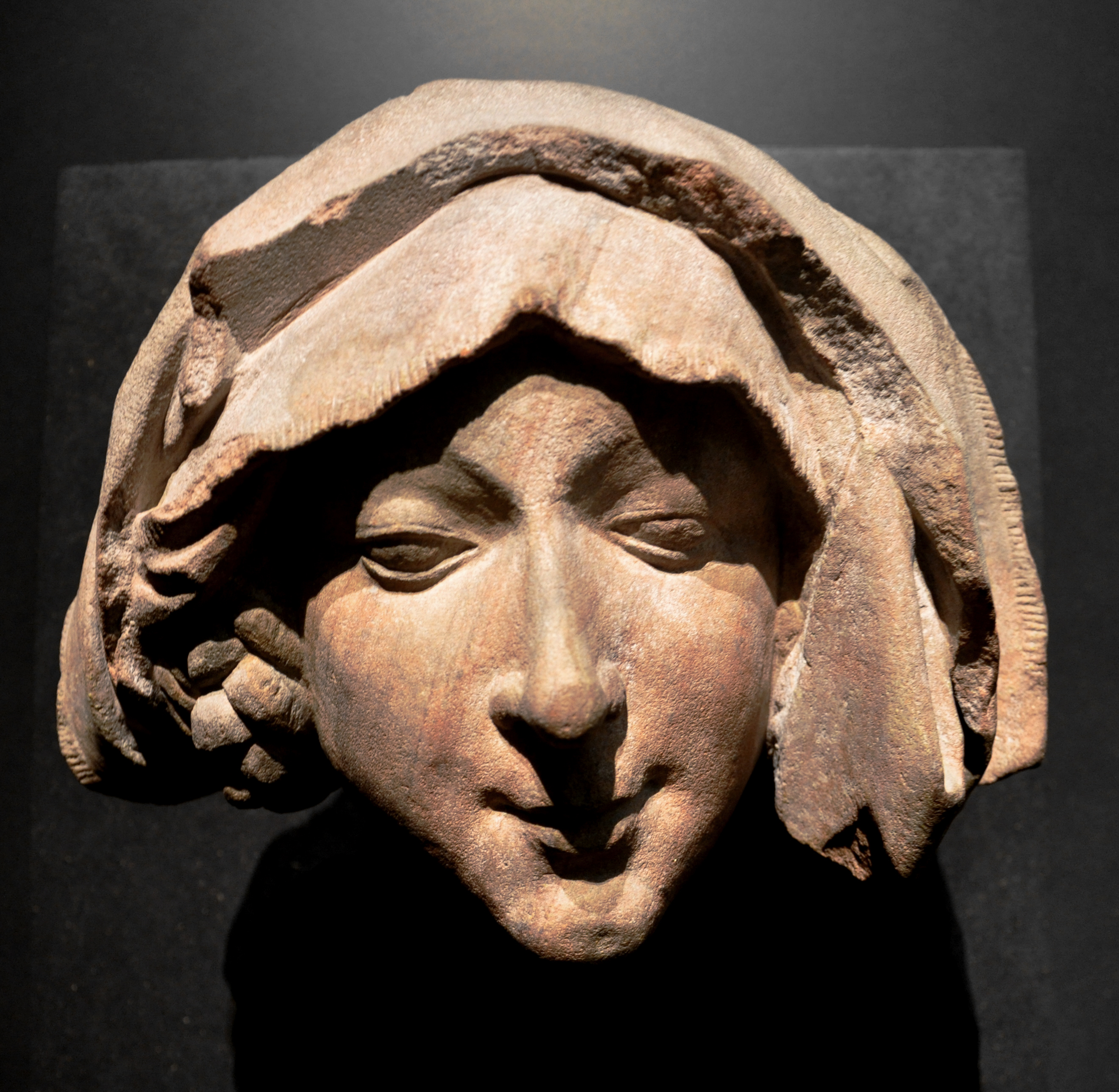
Sibyl, also referred to as Barbara von Ottenheim, Strasbourg, c. 1460/63 (Liebieghaus, Frankfurt)

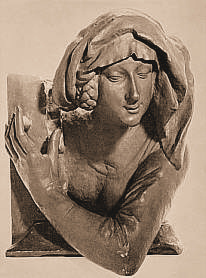
Sibyl, also referred to as Barbara von Ottenheim, plaster cast from before 1870

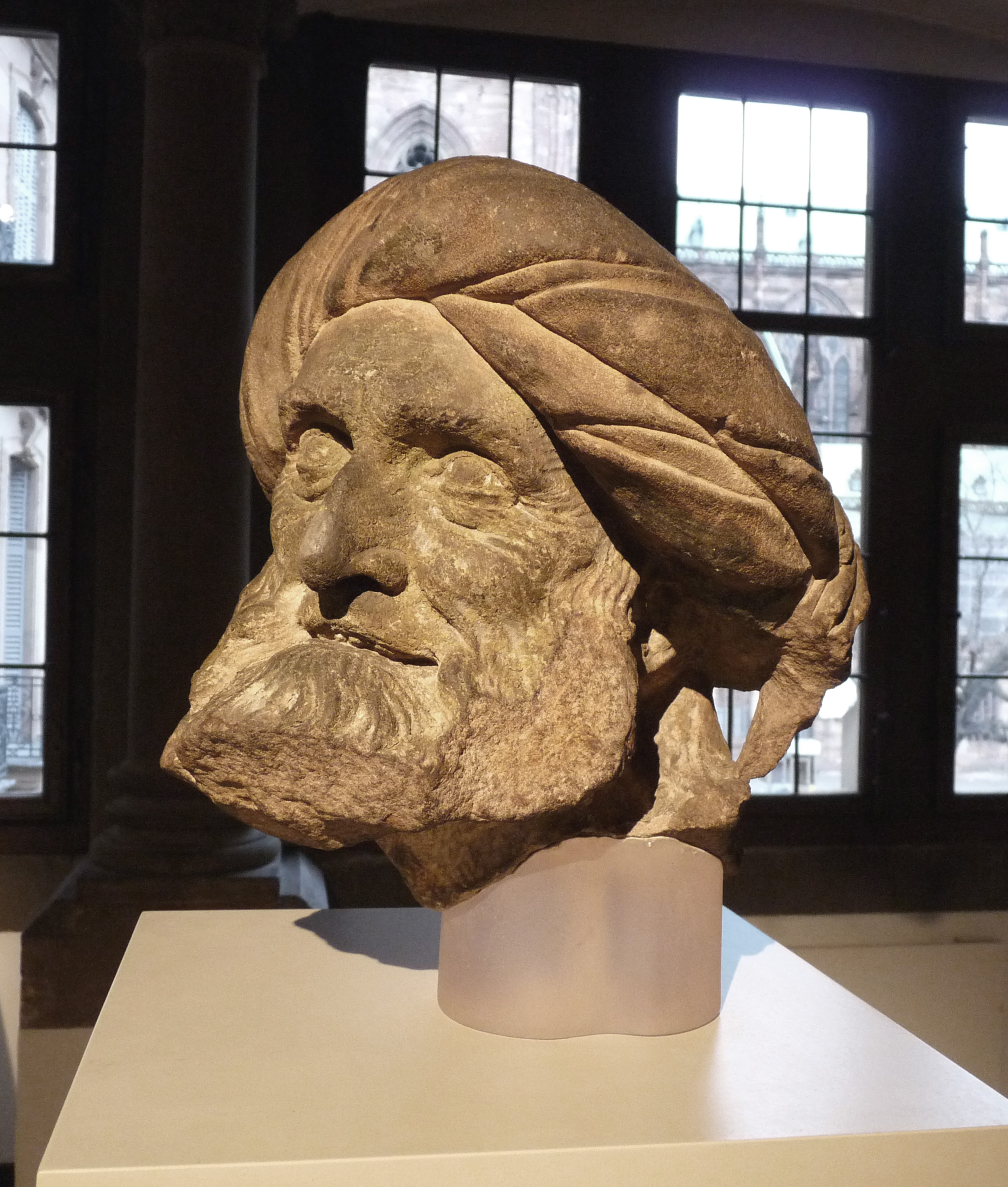
Prophet with Turban, possibly James of Lichtenburg (Musée de l’Œuvre Notre-Dame, Strasbourg)

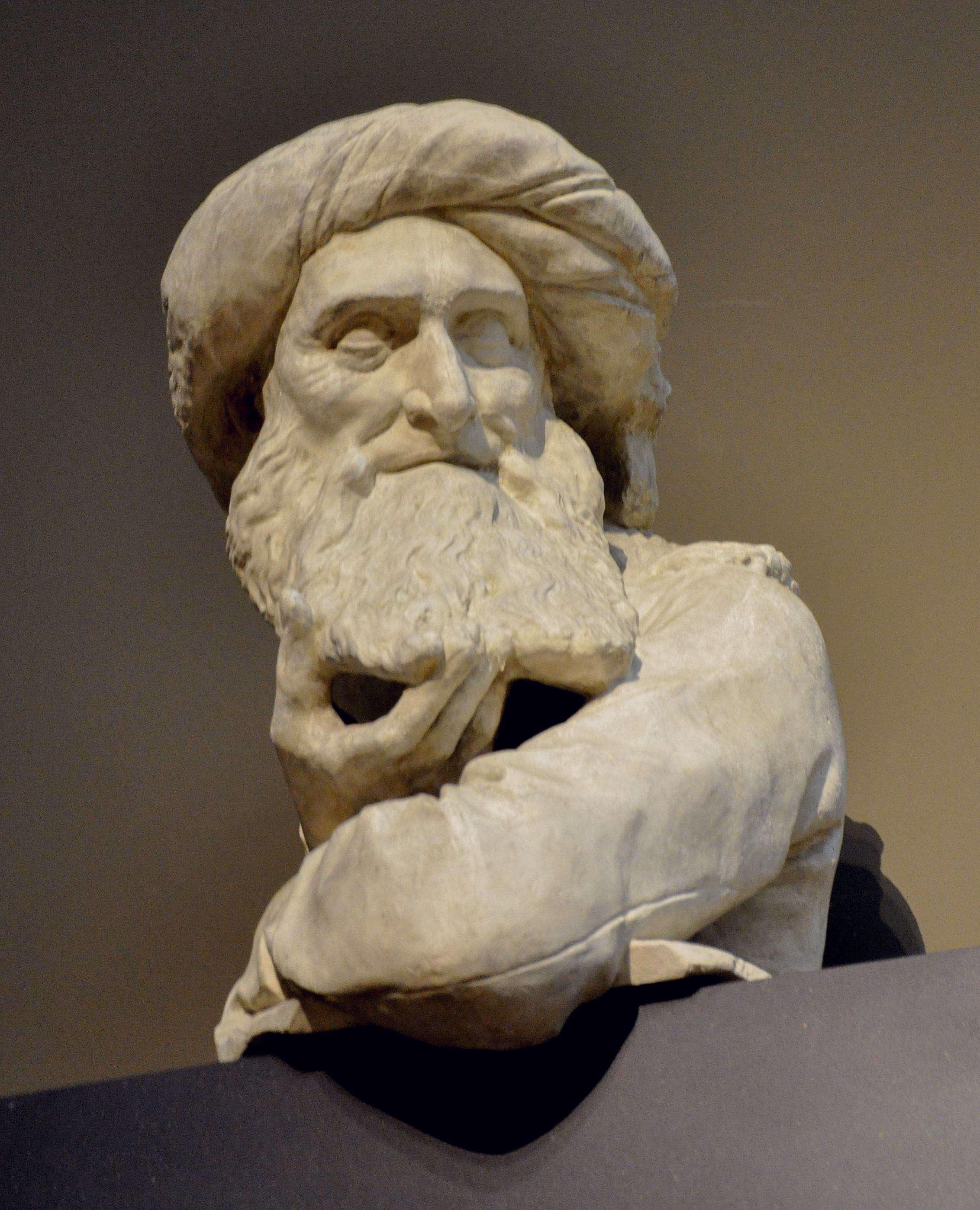
Prophet with Turban, plaster cast from before 1870

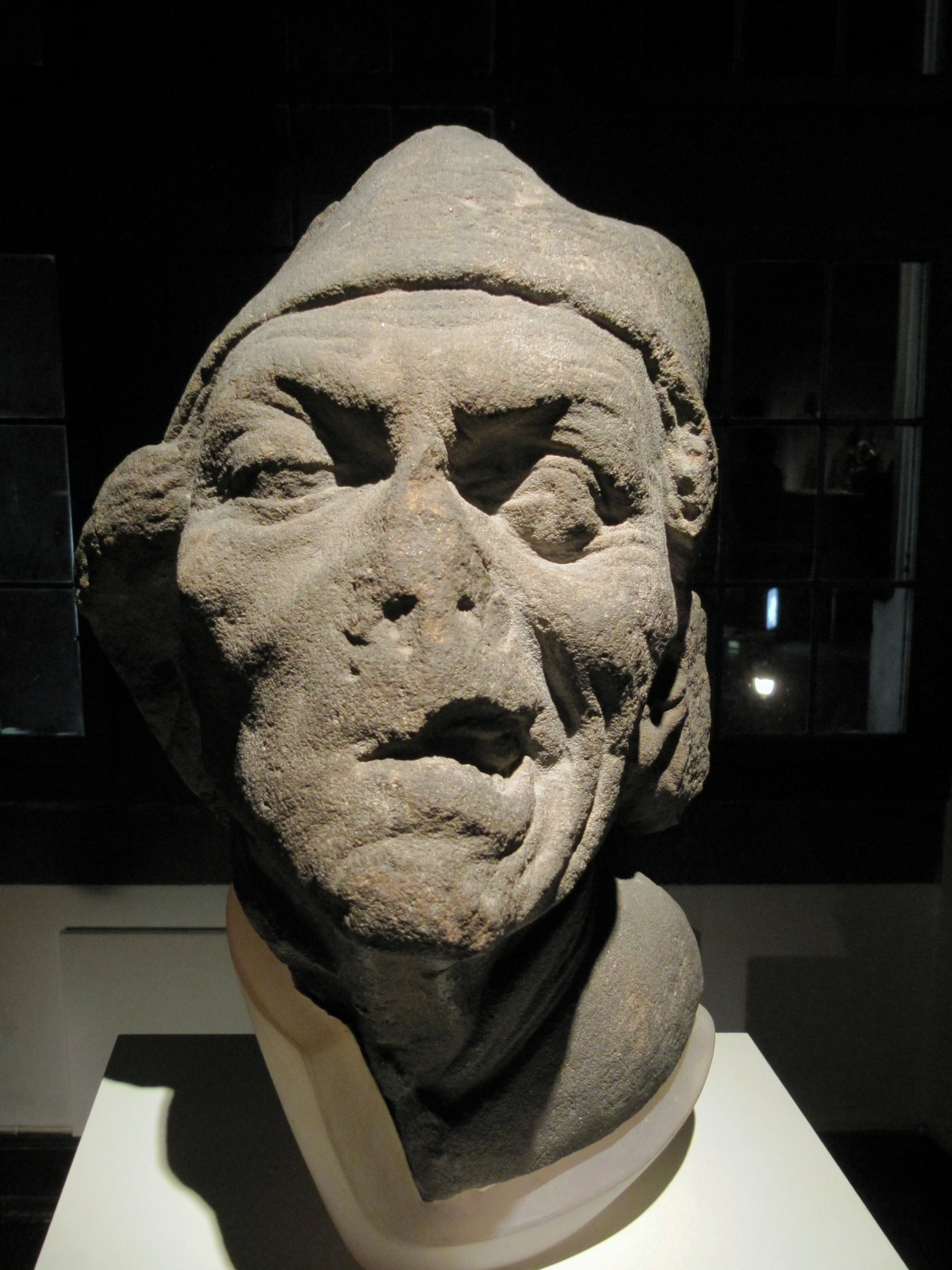
Buste of Man with Lopsided Face, workshop (Musée de l’Œuvre Notre-Dame, Strasbourg)

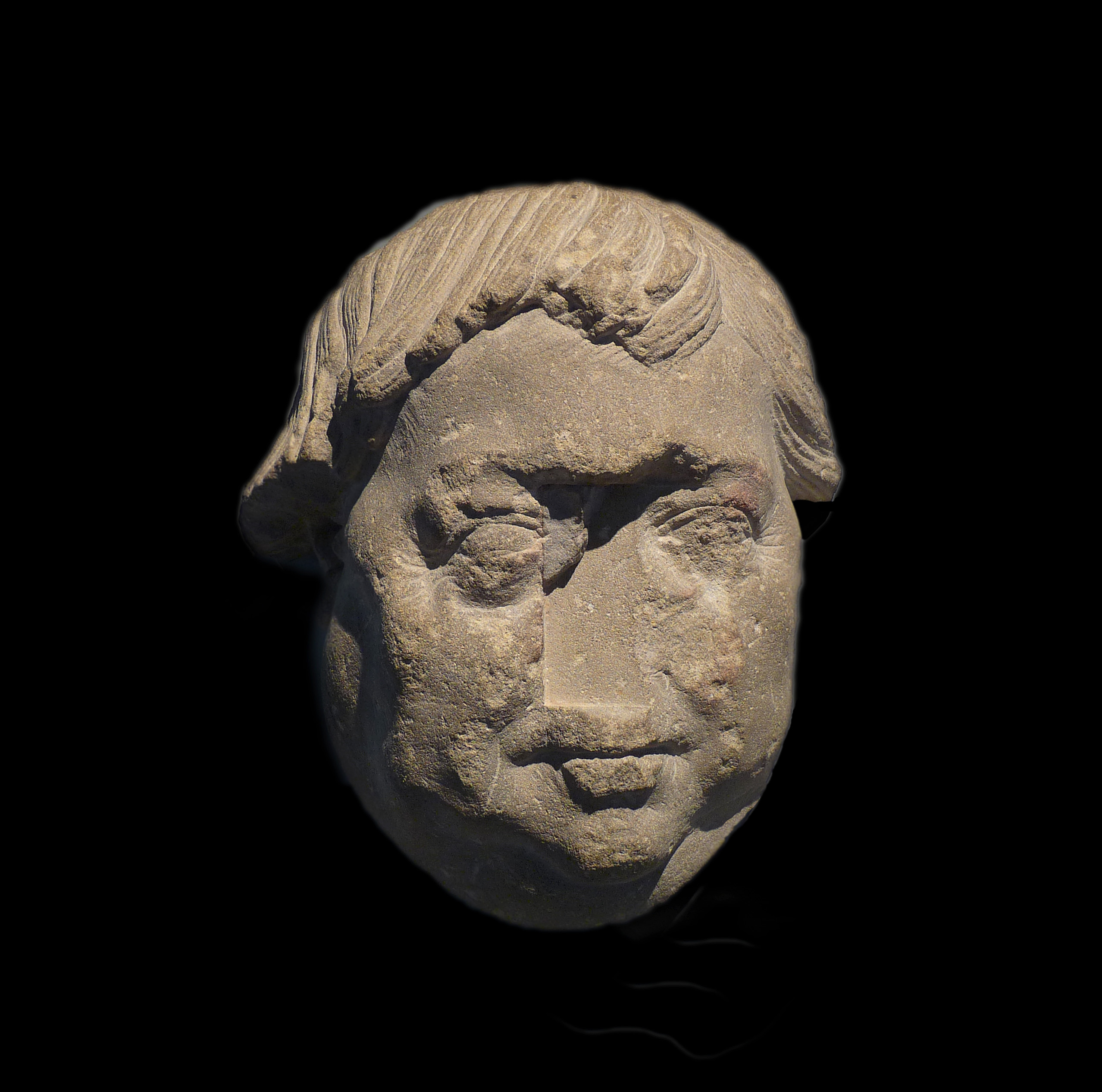
Head of Man (attributed) (Musée de l’Œuvre Notre-Dame, Strasbourg)

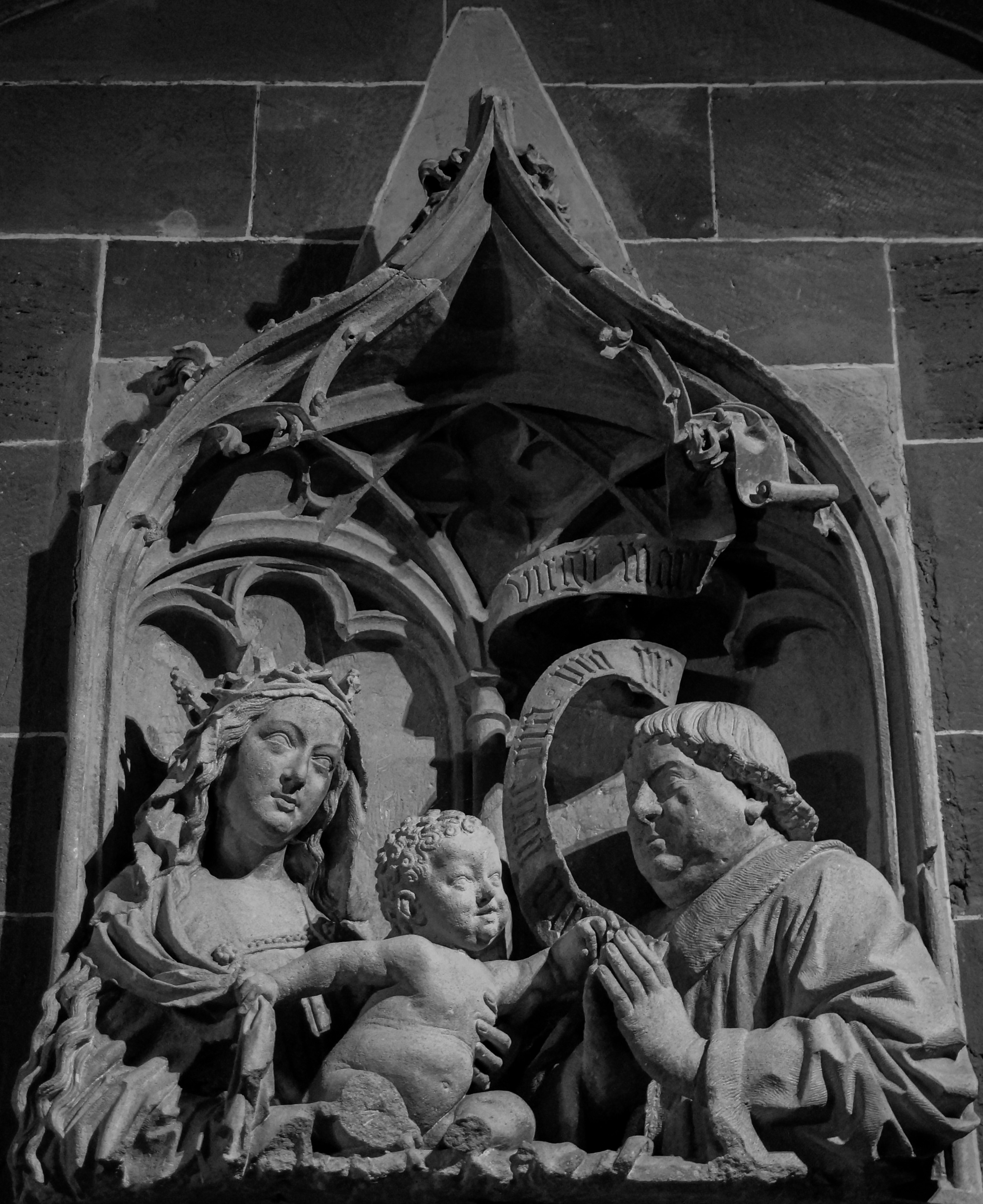
Tomb of Konrad von Bussnang, 1464, Strasbourg Cathedral (detail)

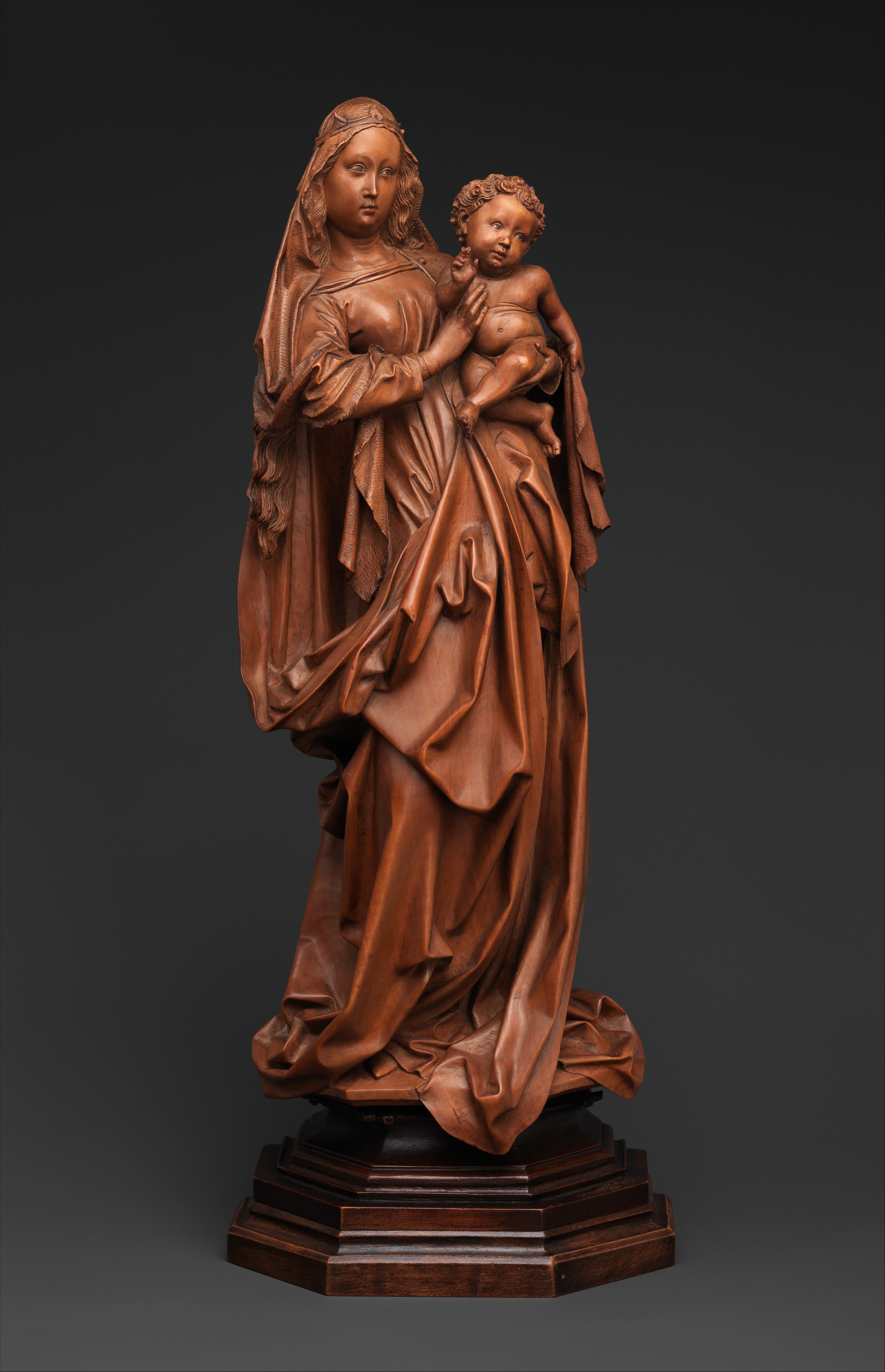
Standing Virgin and Child, boxwood, tinted eyes and lips, c. 1470 (MET, New York)

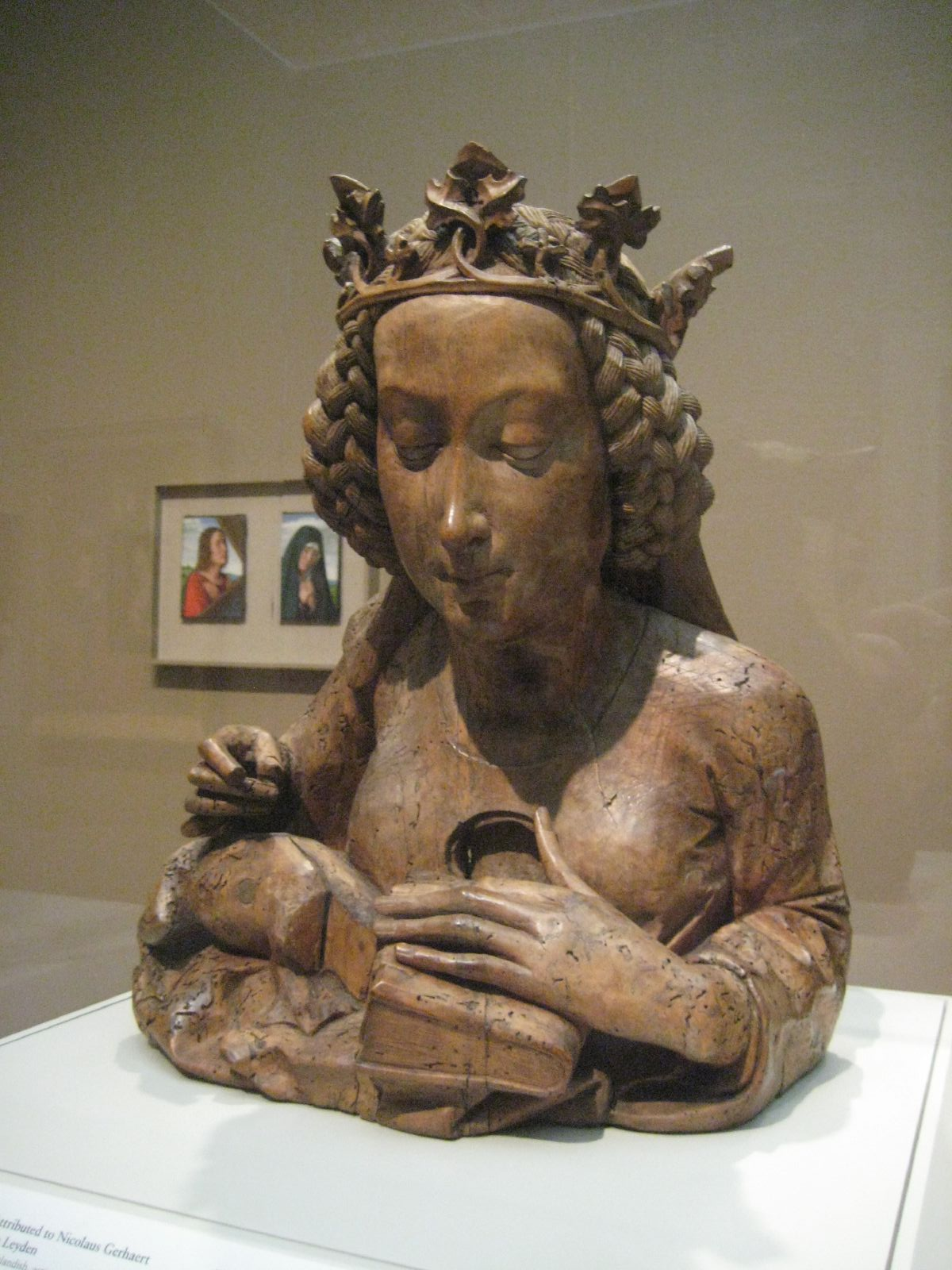
Saint Margaret of Antioch, workshop, walnut, lost paint (Art Institute of Chicago)

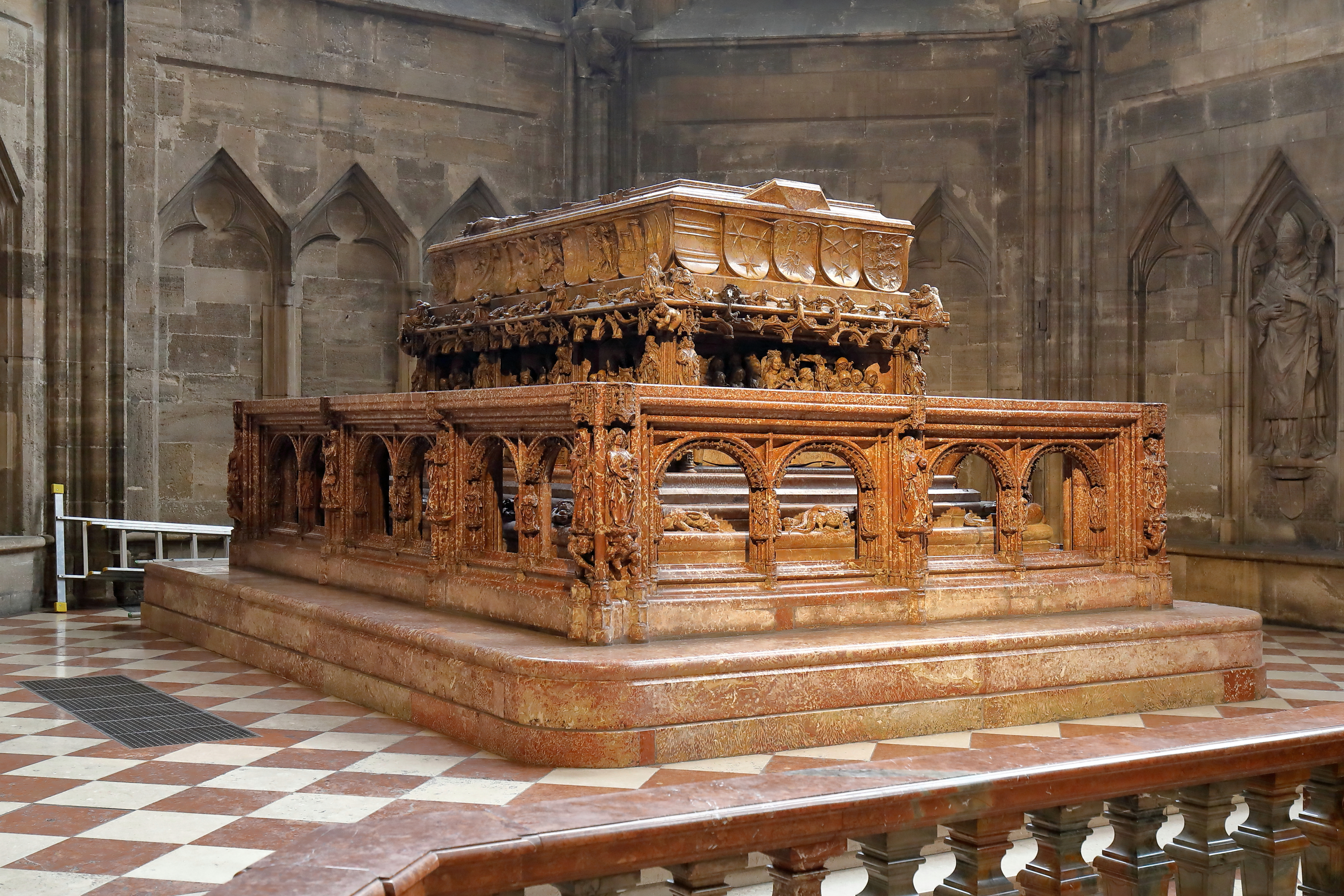
Tomb of Emperor Frederick III in St. Stephen's Cathedral, Vienna

== See also ==
- Erasmus Grasser
- Veit Stoss
- Tilman Riemenschneider
- Michel Erhart
- Nikolaus Hagenauer
