= Thurn und Taxis =

Thurn und Taxis may refer to:

- Thurn und Taxis family, a German noble family
- Thurn-und-Taxis Post, a mail system named for the family
- Thurn and Taxis (board game), a game about the mail system
