= Eufrasia Burlamacchi =

Italian artist (1482–1548)

- Born: 1482; Lucca
- Died: 1548 (aged 65–66); Lucca
- Known for: Illuminated manuscripts

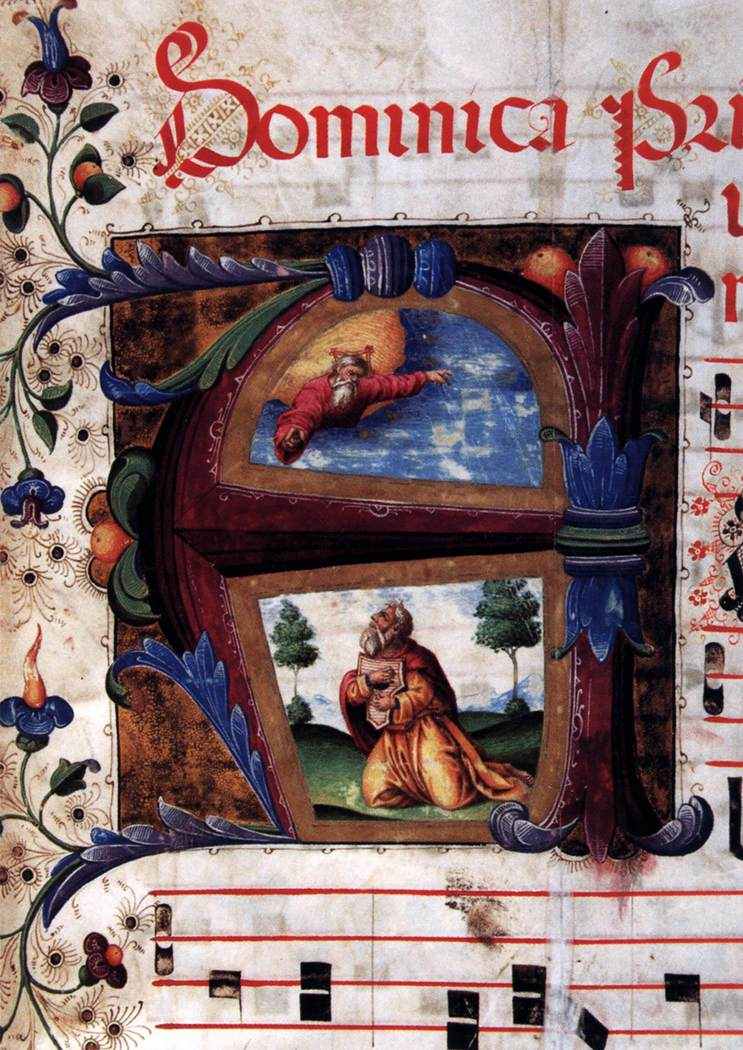
Manuscript illumination

Eufrasia Burlamacchi (1482–1548) was an Italian nun who practiced the art of manuscript illumination.

== Biography ==
Eufrasia Burlamacchi was born in Lucca as a member of the wealthy Burlamacchi family. She became a Dominican nun at the San Nicholao convent. After leaving the convent in 1502, Eufrasia established the convent of San Domenico in Lucca, where she served as Mother Superior. Many other members of the Burlamacchi had also been affiliated with the Dominican order. She is known for the religious illuminated manuscripts she completed there.

Burlamacchi died in Lucca in 1548.

== School of Manuscript Illumination ==
Manuscript illumination is the practice of decorating a text with ornate, often gilded, illustrations and symbols that act both as embellishment and as a way to reinforce the themes of the text. The practice has its roots in Medieval European religious traditions.

At the time when Burlamacchi joined the convent, the Dominicans were followers of Girolamo Savonarola. The convent of San Domenico was founded by some of the nuns from the convent of San Niccolò, hoping to create a refuge for followers of Savonarola, who aligned with ideas of the Reformation.

The convent of San Domenico had a school of text illumination that had been developed and established through the years prior to Burlamacchi's time in the convent. The gilding of religious texts had become a tradition, and for the Dominican nuns, the annotations were expressions of their call to practice charity, poverty, study, and evangelism. Convent members, would duplicate the manuscripts and illuminations to use personally and to sell to communes.

== Legacy ==
Very little is known of Eufrasia Burlamacchi's life, and much of her work has not survived the effects of time. The most significant primary source of information regarding Burlamacchi's life comes from the Libro del Necrologico del Convento di San Domenico di Lucca (Register of Deaths of the Convent of San Domenico of Lucca); there are few secondary sources. The number of her illuminated texts that survive is small; the most significant surviving works are five books of anthems, annotated between 1502, her first year in the convent, and 1515.

In 2023 two volumes of Burlamacchi's Illuminated Antiphonies were exhibited in Making her Mark: A History of Women Artists in Europe, 1400-1800.
