= Lasse from Huittinen =

Finnish criminal who was executed in Sweden in 1488

Lasse
- Born: Huittinen, Finland
- Died: September 1488
- Criminal charges: Theft, defamation of church peace
- Penalty: Death by hanging

Lasse (died September 1488) was a Finnish thief from Huittinen, who stole from dozens of churches in Sweden. He was eventually sentenced to death for his actions.

Lasse was born in Huittinen, though his date of birth and his life before moving from southwestern Finland to Sweden are unknown. Information about him is principally from court documents dating from September 1488. Lasse was caught and charged with dozens of burglaries in different churches before being sentenced to death by hanging. Lasse named 36 churches that he had broken into, and told about other churches that he did not know by name. There were possibly a total of fifty break-in targets. In only two cases did the break-in to the church fail, in Kalmar and Löt, both located in Uppland. He was called "the great church thief". Along with Upland, Lasse made burglarious trips along Mälaren in Södermanland and Västmanland and also broke into a church in Västergötland and two churches in Östergötland, as well as several churches around Stockholm and churches in the Uppsala region. The furthest break-in target was the Bettna church, located between Katrineholm and Nyköping. Lasse's methodical nature is illustrated by the fact that he broke into all the churches immediately west of Strängnäs. His westernmost targets were located near Västerås.

Lasse apparently posed as a pilgrim and stole money, silverware and other small valuables that were easy to transport and sell, especially from rural churches. Only a small portion of the stolen objects could be traced and returned, although their sale must have been quite well organized. In the trial, Lasse claimed that his wife was unaware of his activities, which must have continued for years. On 1 September 1488, he was sentenced to death by hanging from the topmost crossbeam of a gallows for theft and defamation of church peace. The evidence of the acts is unknown, but the confession Lasse made at the gallows to save his soul was recorded. He was hanged in Stockholm in September 1488.
