= Jakobus ("James"), Count of Lichtenberg =

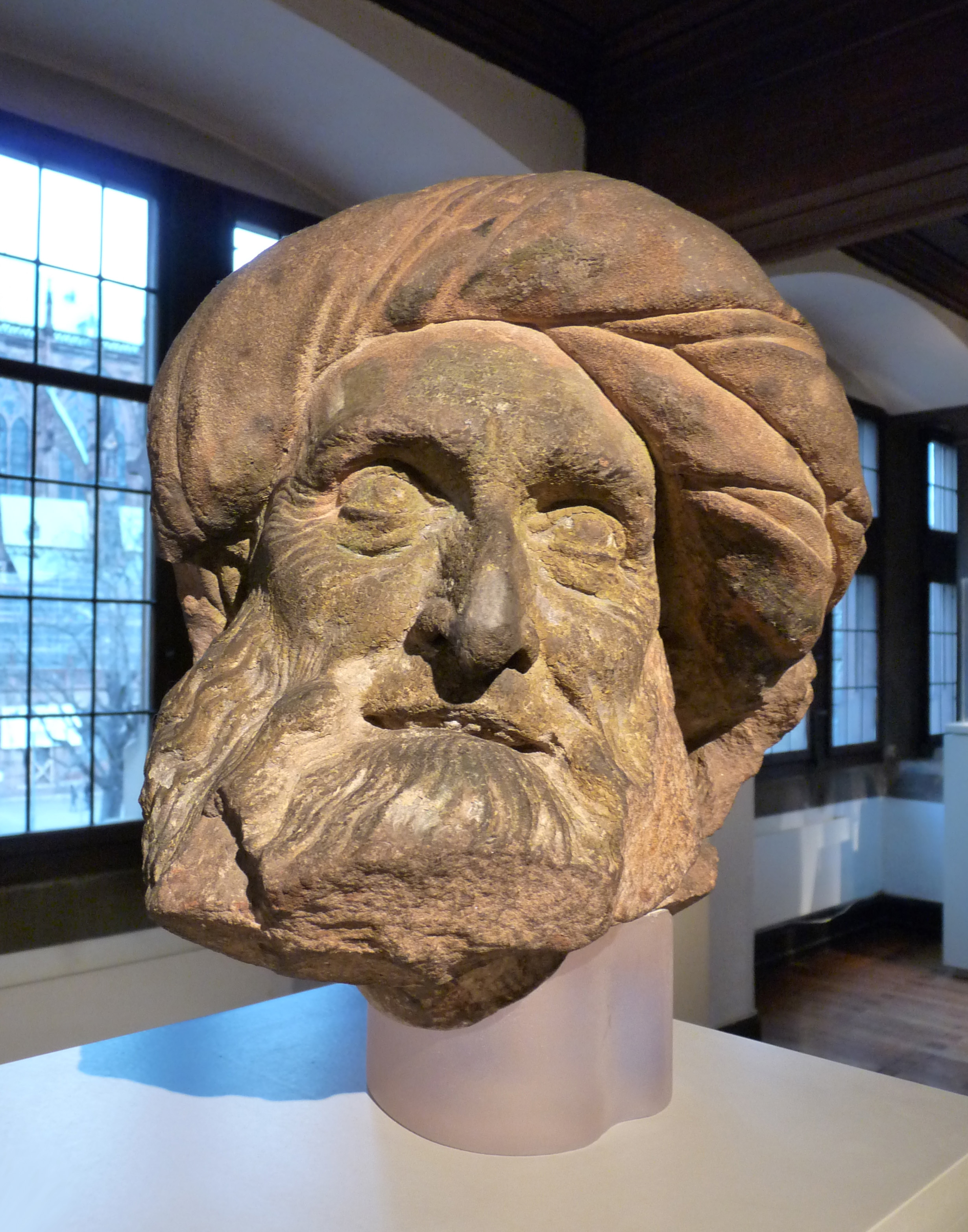
Bearded prophet – traditionally believed to be Jacques de Lichtenberg. Original at the Musée de l'Œuvre Notre-Dame in Strasbourg, by Nicolaus Gerhaert.

James of Lichtenburg (sometimes known as James the bearded) (25 May 1416 – 5 January 1480) was a nobleman from Lichtenberg in the northern part of Alsace. He served as overlord of Strasbourg and was the last in the male line of the House of Lichtenberg.

He took an interest in astronomy.

James of Lichtenberg owes much of his prominence in the surviving records to his unconventional lifestyle and his long running amorous liaison with Barbara von Ottenheim.

== Family ==
James of Lichtenberg was born in 1416, the son of Ludwig/Louis IV of Lichtenberg by his marriage to Anna of Baden (1399-1421). Anna was the eldest recorded daughter of Bernard I, of Baden-Baden.

In 1429 James married the Princess Walpurgis (Walburga) of Saarwerden. She was a daughter of Prince Frederick IV of Moers. She died in 1450 or 1459. The marriage was childless.

Subsequently he lived with Barbara von Ottenheim, whom he allowed to run his household. There was normally no fixed dividing line between private household duties and public landowner duties at this time, and Barbara therefore exercised significant power of government over the Lichtenberger lands. James and Barbara had two children together, but these both died young. The relationship between James and Barbara greatly damaged his relationship with his family, and particularly with his younger brother, Louis V of Lichtenberg and, later, Louis' heirs and successors to the family lands. These included two of Louis's sons-in-law, Philipp I, Count of Hanau-Lichtenberg who married Louis' daughter Anna and Simnon IV, Wecker who married Louis' younger daughter Elisabeth.

== Elevation ==
In 1458 The Emperor appointed James a councillor to the Imperial Court and raised him to the nobility, with the rank of a Count.
