= Premislav of Tost =

Premislav of Tost (1425 – December 1484) was a ruler in Silesia, sometimes known by his diminutive Primko. He was the second son of Duke Kasimir I of Silesia-Auschwitz (ruled 1406–1434).

Several years after his father's death Premislav received the Duchy of Tost, which he ruled for forty-five years (1439–1484). He died aged fifty-nine.

Duke Premislav was married (1463) to Machna (1442–1472), the eldest daughter of Duke Nikolaus I of Silesia-Oppeln. The couple left no male heirs, just a surviving daughter named Margaret of Tost (1467 – November 8, 1531), who took holy orders and was appointed abbess of the convent of St Klara in Breslau (1508–1531).

== Sources ==
- Europäische Stammtafeln, Vol III, Part I - Table 16, Prince W.K. von Isenburg & D. Schwennicke, Marburg (1984)
