= Barbara von Ottenheim =

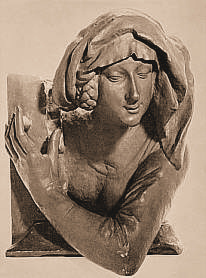
- Born: 1430
- Died: 1484 (aged 53–54)
- Partner: Jakobus, Count of Lichtenberg

Bärbel von Ottenheim, or Barbara von Ottenheim (1430–1484), was the mistress of Lord James von Lichtenberg, the last sovereign of Lichtenberg and bailiff of Strasbourg. She is the model of a famous portrait sculpture, which is now in the Liebieghaus Sculpture Collection in Frankfurt am Main.

At the death of James von Lichtenberg in 1480, she became the main beneficiary of his will. The other heirs, Simon IV of Zweibrücken-Bitsch and Philip II of Hanau-Lichtenberg, accused her of witch craft. She died in prison before the verdict, possibly of murder or suicide.

== Sources ==
- M. Goltzené: Aus der Geschichte des Amtes Buchsweiler. In: Pay d’Alsace, Heft 111/112, S. 64f.
- Fritz Eyer: Das Territorium der Herren von Lichtenberg. Straßburg 1938.
- Ernstotto zu Solms-Laubach: Bärbel von Ottenheim. Frankfurt 1936.
- Peter Karl Weber: Lichtenberg. Eine elsässische Herrschaft auf dem Weg zum Territorialstaat. Heidelberg 1993.
