= 1430s =

Decade

The 1430s decade ran from January 1, 1430, to December 31, 1439.

== Events ==
=== 1430 ===
==== January–March ====
- January 7 – Philip the Good, Duke of Burgundy, marries Isabella of Portugal.
- January 10 – Philip the Good founds the Order of the Golden Fleece.
- February 6 – The Hussite General Andreas Prokop signs a treaty with Frederick I, Elector of Brandenburg at Kulmbach, agreeing to withdraw Hussite troops entirely from Germany.
- February 23 – King Henry VI of England gives royal assent to numerous bills passed by the English Parliament, including the Treason Act 1429 (which makes sending an extortion letter a felony, and the burning of a house as retaliation for nonpayment of money an act of treason. Additionally, assent is given to the Forcible Entry Act 1429, the Electors of Knights of the Shires Act 1429, and the Weights and Measures Act 1429.
- March 29 – The Ottoman Empire, led by the Sultan Murad II, captures Thessalonica in Greece after an eight-year siege.

==== April–June ====
- April 28 – The Hussites defeat Hungarian and Serbian troops in the Battle of Nagyszombat in an invasion of the Kingdom of Hungary near Nagyszombat (now Trnava in Slovakia).
- May 14 – The French first attempt to relieve the Siege of Compiègne.
- May 23 – Joan of Arc is captured by the Burgundian troops, led by John II, Count of Ligny, while leading an army to relieve Compiègne. After her surrender to Lyonnel de Wandomme, she is turned over to Philip the Good, Duke of Burgundy, and incarcerated at the castle of Beaulieu-les-Fontaines.
- June 14 – William Waynflete becomes vicar of Skendleby, Lincolnshire.

==== July–September ====
- July 3 – In the Bavarian town of Lindau, 15 Jewish residents are burned at the stake after being accused of murdering a Christian child.
- July 11 – Battle of Trnava: The Hussites defeat the Hungarian-Moravian-Serbian army.
- August 23 – Pope Martin V, writing in the papal brief Ad statum, grants recognition to the Order of Friars Minor Conventual, allowing them the right to hold property.
- September 4 – the Republic of Venice signs a treaty with the Ottoman Empire to end the eight-year war between the two nations after the Ottoman capture of Thessalonica, replacing the previous agreement of 1419.

==== October–December ====
- October 27 – Vytautas, the Grand Duke of Lithuania, dies shortly after the cancellation of plans to crown him as King of Lithuania. His cousin Švitrigaila is elected unanimously by the Lithuanian nobles as the new Grand Duke, violating an agreement with the Kingdom of Poland that the Polish nobles would be able to participate in the election.
- November 16 – (1st waxing of Natdaw 792 ME) In Burma, Min Saw Mon, King of Arakan, moves the capital from Launggyet to the nearby, but more strategically located, city of Mrauk-U.
- November 21 – Joan of Arc is sold by the Burgundians to the Kingdom of England for 10,000 livre tournois, equivalent to 808.8 kg (28,530 oz or 1,783.1 lbs) of silver.
- November 27 – King Henry VI summons members of Parliament to assemble on January 12.
- December 23 – Seven months after her capture at Compiegne, Joan of Arc is moved from the castle of Le Crotoy to the tower at the Rouen Castle.

==== Date unknown ====
- With the surrender of Chalandritsa and the citadel of Patras to the Byzantine Despotate of the Morea, the Principality of Achaea comes to an end.
- Bratislava Castle is converted to a fortress under Sigismund of Luxembourg.

=== 1431 ===
==== January–March ====
- January 9 – Pretrial investigations for Joan of Arc begin at Rouen in France, which is under English occupation.
- February 21 – The trial of Joan of Arc for heresy begins.
- March 11 – Cardinal Gabriele Condulmer is elected as the successor to Pope Martin V and takes the name of Pope Eugene IV as the 207th leader of the Roman Catholic Church.
- March – Alexander I Aldea takes the throne of Wallachia with support from Alexander I of Moldavia.

==== April–June ====
- April 4 – In Poland, Konrad V Kantner, Duke of Silesia, leads a raid against the Hussites at Gliwice.
- April 5 – In Germany, Jacob of the House of Zähringen becomes the new Margrave of Baden-Baden upon the death of his father, Bernard I.
- May 30 – 19-year-old Joan of Arc is burned at the stake in Rouen.
- June 6 – The Battle on the Po takes place on the Po River in Italy near Cremona as the navy of the Duchy of Milan defeats a fleet of 85 galleys of the Republic of Venice. The Venetians lose over 2,500 men, as well as 28 of the galley warships and 42 transport ships.
- June 16 – The Teutonic Knights and Švitrigaila sign the Treaty of Christmemel, creating an anti-Polish alliance.
- June 25 – The Polish army invades the Principality of Volhynia, part of modern-day Ukraine, and captures much of the territory.

==== July–September ====
- July 1 – Reconquista: In Spain, the army of the Crown of Castile, led by Álvaro de Luna, defeats the Moors of the Emirate of Granada, led by the Sultan Muhammad IX, in the Battle of La Higueruela, fought at Vega de Granada.
- July 2 – In the Battle of Bulgnéville over who will be the next Duke of Lorraine, Count Antoine de Vaudémont, supported by Burgundian and English troops, defeats René of Anjou, who is supported by the Kingdom of France.
- July 25 – An ecumenical council of the Roman Catholic Church, originally called by Pope Martin V before his death in February, convenes at Basel in Switzerland.
- August 14 – Hussites under Prokop the Great and Sigismund Korybut defeat the forces of Frederick of Brandenburg at the Battle of Domažlice.
- August 21 – The navy of the Republic of Venice, commanded by Armiral Pietro Loredan, gains a major victory over the Republic of Genoa in a battle off of the coast of Rapallo, but fails to overthrow the Doge Battista Spinola
- August 26 (September 2 N.S.) – At the Polish city of Chortoryisk, representatives of Švitrigaila, Grand Duke of Lithuania and of the King of Poland, Władysław II Jagiełło agree to a truce to end the Lutsk War.
- September 13 – The army of Poland defeats the Teutonic Knights at the Battle of Dąbki,
- September – Battle of Inverlochy: Donald Balloch defeats the Royalists in Scotland.

==== October–December ====
- October 15 – The Roman Catholic Council of Basel issues a formal invitation to the Hussites to take part in its deliberations.
- October 30 – The Treaty of Medina del Campo is signed, consolidating peace between Portugal and Castille.
- November 9 – The Hungarians defeat the Hussite army at the Battle of Ilava.
- November 18 – A treaty in Suceava concludes an attack on Poland, launched this year by Alexander I of Moldavia during the Lithuanian Civil War.
- December 13 – Vlad, future Prince of Wallachia as Vlad II Dracul, is made a member of the Order of the Dragon. Because of this, his son Vlad III the Impaler will inspire the literary figure named Dracula.
- December 14 – The first full meeting of the Roman Catholic council at Basel is convened, but Pope Eugene IV and the council members are not able to agree on principles.
- December 16 – Henry VI of England is crowned King of France at Notre-Dame de Paris.

==== Date unknown ====
- The University of Poitiers is founded.
- The Ayutthaya Kingdom besieges Angkor and sacks the Khmer capital, ending the Khmer Empire.
- Nezahualcoyotl is crowned Tlatoani of the Kingdom of Texcoco.
- Byzantine–Ottoman Wars: The Ottoman governor of Thessaly Turahan Bey breaks through the Hexamilion wall for the second time, and ravages the Peloponnese Peninsula.

=== 1432 ===
==== January–March ====
- January 1 –
  - Yusuf IV is placed on the throne as the new Sultan of Granada, after Muhammad IX is deposed with the support of King Juan II of Castile and Leon. Yusuf dies later in the year and Muhammad IX is restored to the throne a third time
  - Iliaș succeeds his father as Prince of Moldavia.
- January 6 – The siege of Pouancé is undertaken by John V, Duke of Brittany, against his nephew Jean II, Duke of Alençon, as part of a conflict involving the payment of a dowry. The siege lasts until February 22 when Alençon surrenders.
- February 13 – The 42 feet (13 m) tall Statue of Gommateshwara is consecrated by King Veera Pandya in the Indian city of Karkala, capital of the Vijayanagara Empire and now part of the Karnataka state.
- March 5 – The Treaty of Rennes is signed between the Kingdom of France (led by King Charles VII and the Duchy of Brittany (led by the Duke Arthur III.
- March 7 – The seventh Ming Chinese overseas expedition fleet, led by Admiral Zheng He, arrives at the port of Surabaya on the island of Java (now in Indonesia). The Chinese do trading until leaving on July 13
- March 29 – Venetian General Francesco Bussone da Carmagnola is arrested in Venice after reporting to a meeting with the Council of Ten and the Venetian Doge Tommaso Mocenigo. The Doge dies five days later.

==== April–June ====
- April 15 – Francesco Foscari is elected as the new Doge of the Republic of Venice, defeating the other candidate, Admiral Pietro Loredan, and becomes the longest serving Venetian chief executive, presiding for more than 34 years.
- April 26 – At Philippopolis in the Ottoman Empire (now Plovdiv in Bulgaria, Mercimek Ahmed completes his translation of the Qabus-nama from the Persian language into Turkish.
- May 5 – With the Tommaso Mocenigo, Doge of Venice, no longer able to protect him, General Francesco Bussone da Carmagnola is beheaded in prison.
- May 6 – Jan van Eyck's Ghent Altarpiece is first presented to the public.
- May 12 – The new English Parliament session is opened at Westminster by the regents for King Henry VI of England, and Sir John Russell is elected by his peers as Speaker of the House of Commons.
- June 1 – In the battle of San Romano, fought in Italy only 30 miles (48 km) from the capital at Florence, the Republic of Florence cavalry and infantry, led by General Niccolò da Tolentino defeat the army of the Republic of Siena, led by Francesco Piccinino. The Renaissance painter Paolo Uccello later commemorates the event in a triptych painting.
- June 29 – At Nicosia John II becomes King of Cyprus upon the death of his father, King Janus.

==== July–September ====
- July 17 – The English Parliament closes its session at Westminster. Royal assent is given in the King's name to the Electors of Knights of the Shire Act 1432 ("Certain things required in him who shall be a chooser of the knights of the parliament"), the Appearance of Plaintiffs Act (setting "the penalty of him that maketh a false entry, that the plaintiff doth offer himself in person, where his doth not") and the Exportation Act ("All wools and woolfells that shall be carried to any other place than to Calais, shall be forfeited to the King and the finder.")
- August 3 – The Ming Chinese expedition arrives at Malacca in what is now Malaysia and stays until September 2.
- August 15 – With 132 ships, the navy of Spain's Crown of Aragon, dispatched by King Alfonso V, lands in North Africa at the island of Djerba off of the coast of Tunisia and begins a siege. The Caliph of Ifriqiya, Abu Faris Abd al-Aziz II, attempts to defend the island. but the Aragonese take control of Djerba by September 9.
- August 31 – Sigismund Kęstutaitis attempts the capture or murder of Švitrigaila, his rival for the throne of the Grand Duchy of Lithuania. Švitrigaila manages to escape.
- September 1 – With the departure of Švitrigaila, Sigismund Kęstutaitis is installed as the new Grand Duke of Lithuania.
- September 9 – The Siege of Djerba ends with the invading armies of Aragon defeating the soldiers of Ifriqiya.
- September 12 – The Ming Chinese expedition reaches the Samudera Pasai Sultanate on Sumatra (now part of Indonesia) and establishes trade agreements with the Sultan Zainal Abidin II, remaining at Pasai until November 2.
- September 30 – A delegation from Poland, led by the Bishop of Kraków, Cardinal Zbigniew Oleśnicki, arrives in Vilnius and brings a message Grand Duke Sigismund that King Władysław II Jagiełło of Poland recognizes Sigismund as Lithuania's ruler, for life.

==== October–December ====
- October 25 – Grand Duke Sigismund of Lithuania signs a document at Grodno (now part of Belarus swearing his loyalty to Poland.
- November 12 – Pope Eugenius IV authorizes Cardinal Giuliano Cesarini to close the Council of Basel, but Cesarini declines to do so.
- November 19 – At the Battle of Delebio, Niccolò Piccinino, leader of Milanese Army defeats the Venetian troops of Taddeo d'Este after a two-day battle in which more than 5,300 Venetian cavalry and infantry are killed.
- November 28 – The Ming Chinese expedition lands at the island of Sri Lanka, coming ashore at Beruwala at the Kingdom of Kotte, ruled by Parakramabahu VI, but departs for India four days later.
- December 8 – Lithuanian Civil War (1432–1438): The first battle between the forces of Švitrigaila and Sigismund Kęstutaitis is fought near the town of Oszmiana (Ashmyany), launching the most active phase of the civil war in the Grand Duchy of Lithuania.
- December 10 – The Ming Chinese expedition stops briefly at the Calicut Kingdom (now part of the Kerala state of India) and leaves on December 14 to sail westward across the Indian Ocean toward the island of Hormuz.

==== Date unknown ====
- The Université de Caen is founded.
- The first baccalaureate service is believed to have originated at the University of Oxford.

=== 1433 ===
==== January–March ====
- January 3 – Władysław II Jagiełło, King of Poland, acknowledges the oath of loyalty made on October 25 by Žygimantas I Kęstutaitis, Grand Duke of Lithuania, continuing the progress of the eventual Uniting of Poland and Lithuania.
- January 4 – Prokop the Great, leader of the Hussites of Bohemia, appears at the Council of Basel with his envoys in order to negotiate and end to the anti-Hussite Crusade started by the Holy Roman Empire and the Pope.
- January 9 – At Kraków, King Wladyslaw II of Poland issues the rule of Neminem captivabimus nisi iure victum barring the arrest of any member of Poland's nobility unless that person has first been found guilty of an offense.
- January 17 – The seventh Ming Chinese overseas expedition fleet, led by Admiral Zheng He, arrives at the island of Hormuz in the Persian Gulf, its furthest westward travel and stays for almost two months before setting off for its return to China.
- February 8 – Vasily II, Grand Prince of Moscow, is married to Maria Yaroslavna of Borovsk, but at the wedding banquet, he enters a quarrel with his uncle, Yury Dmitrievich. The argument leads to the Battle on the River Klyazma on April 25.
- February 15 – Pope Eugene IV withdraws his papal bull of 1431 that had ordered the Council of Basel to be dissolved, and declares "that the said council from its very beginning was and is a legitimate council and it should continue as if no dissolution was made."
- March 9 – The Ming Chinese expedition departs from Hormuz Island and begins its four-month voyage home to Beijing.

==== April–June ====
- April 9 – Ispend bin Yusuf deposes Shah Muhammad of Qara Qoyunlu as Governor of Baghdad.
- April 12 – Jacqueline, Countess of Hainaut signs the Treaty of The Hague, abdicating her rule and ownership of the Dutch counties of Holland, Hainaut, Zeeland and Friesland|(all inherited from her father Willem VI of Holland in 1417), transferring them to Philip the Good, Duke of Burgundy
- April 25 – Yury Dmitrievich of Zvenigorod defeats the Grand Prince of Moscow, Vasily II, at the Battle on the River Klyazma, in a war over the succession to the Muscovite throne.
- May 9 – (6th waning of Kason 795 ME) At what is now Mrauk U on the western coast of northern Myanmar, Min Khayi becomes the new King of Arakan upon the death of his older brother, Min Saw Mon.
- May 12 – The Regency Council for King Henry VI summons the members of Parliament to assemble at Westminster on July 8.
- May 13 – Bolko V the Hussite, Duke of Opole and ruler of most of Upper Silesia and much of Lower Silesia in Poland, is defeated by Nicholas V, Duke of Krnov at the Battle of Trzebnica.
- May 17 – The Principality of Brunswick-Wolfenbüttel becomes the first state in the Holy Roman Empire to abolish serfdom as the Duke Heinrich der Friedfertige ("Heinrich the Peaceful") ends the fedual system there by decree.
- May 31 – Sigismund is crowned as the Holy Roman Emperor in Rome. The Imperial throne has been vacant for more than 52 years since the death of Sigismund's father, Charles IV, in 1378.
- June 24 – The 1431 truce of Staryi Chortoryisk, halting the Lithuanian Civil War, expires and fighting resumes with Poland allying itself with the Hussites against the Teutonic Order.
- June – Sarwe Iyasus becomes the new Emperor of Ethiopia upon the death of his father Takla Maryam.

==== July–September ====
- July 8 – The English Parliament assembles at Westminster, and Roger Hunt is elected as Speaker of the House of Commons.
- July 22 – Admiral Zheng He and the crew of the seventh Ming Chinese overseas expedition return to China, arriving at Beijing two and one half years after their departure on January 19, 1411 from Nanjing. With the completion of the maritime expedition, the fleet is dispersed, altering the balance of power in the Indian Ocean, and making it easier for Portugal and other Western naval powers to gain dominance over the seas.
- August 14 – Edward I becomes King of Portugal.
- September 7 – Cosimo de' Medici, later the unofficial leader of ruler of Florence and patron of Marsilio Ficino, is imprisoned in the Palazzo dei Priori. Initially facing life imprisonment, Medici is then exiled by the Albizzi/Strozzi faction instead. He returns a year later, on October 6, 1434.
- September 14 – Emperor Xuanzong of Ming dynasty China welcomes the envoys of 11 foreign nations that had sent representatives to travel back to China with Admiral Zheng He's fleet. Present at the Imperial Court as guests are envoys of the kings of Samudera, Kingdom of Kotte, Kingdom of Cochin, Calicut, Dhofar, Aden, Coimbatore, Hormuz, Jayile and Mecca.
- September 16 – A legate of Cardinal Niccolò Albergati, who had been determined to break up the Council of Basel, arrives at the Council and informs the group that Albergati is ready to negotiate.

==== October–December ====
- October 5 – (7th day of 9th month of the year Quy Suu); In Hanoi (at the time Dong Kinh) 9-year-old Le Thai Tong becomes the new King of Dai Viet and ruler of northern Vietnam upon the death of his father, Le Loi.
- October – Iliaș of Moldavia is deposed by his half-brother and joint ruler Stephen II.
- November 30 – After months of negotiations between the Council of Basel and the Bohemian government, the Compactata of Prague is ratified an assembly of Bohemian and Moravian representatives, resolving the conflict between the Roman Catholic Church and the Hussites.
- December 15 – The Truce of Leczyca is signed between the Kingdom of Poland and the Teutonic Order and temporarily ends the Polish–Teutonic War. The Teutons agree to stop their support of the former Lithuanian Grand Duke Švitrigaila
- December 21 – The Parliament of England closes after six months.

==== Date unknown ====
- In Ming Dynasty China, cotton is listed as a permanent item of trade, on the tax registers of Songjiang prefecture.

=== 1434 ===
==== January–March ====
- January 9 – (Rajab 9, 837 AH) King Alfonso V of Aragon ruler of the Kingdom of Sicily as well, contracts with tapestry weaver Guillem d'Uxelles to Flanders to begin learning the Flemish methods to be duplicated in Spain, beginning the "Hispano-Flemish" style.
- February 19 – In India, Mubarak Shah II, the Sultan of Delhi, is assassinated. His nephew, Muhammad Shah IV becomes the new Sultan.
- March 16 – Muscovite War of Succession: Yury of Zvenigorod defeats his nephew, Vasily II, Grand Prince of Moscow, in a battle at Rostov, about 125 miles (201 km) from Moscow.
- March 31 – Yury of Zvenigorod marches into Moscow with his army and plunders Vasily II's treasury.

==== April–June ====
- April 14 – The foundation stone of Nantes Cathedral in Nantes, Brittany, is laid.
- May 30 – Hussite Wars – Battle of Lipany: The Catholics and Utraquists defeat the Taborites, ending the Hussite Wars.
- June 20 – Zara Yaqob becomes Emperor of Ethiopia.
- June 24 – Iron mine owner Engelbrekt Engelbrektsson begins the Engelbrekt rebellion in Sweden against King Erik, starting with an attack against the town of Borlänge, followed by Köpingehus, burning down offices there and then marching on towards Västerås.

==== July–September ====
- July 5– Slightly more than three months after claiming the Grand Principality of Moscow, Yury of Zvenigorod dies suddenly at the age of 59 and is succeeded by his son, Vasily Kosoy.
- July 10– In the Kingdom of León in Spain, Suero de Quiñones first stage the and his companions stage the Passo Honroso, at the bridge across the Órbigo River near Santiago de Compostela. Any knight attempting to cross the bridge is challenged to a joust by the Quiñones knights. The challenge continues for the next 30 days.
- July 25 – The coronation of Wladyslaw III as King of Poland takes place at the Wawel Cathedral in Kraków.
- August 9 – After fighting 166 jousts, and sustaining injuries over a month, Quiñones and his men end the Passo Honroso.
- August 16 – King Eric of Pomerania is deposed from the Swedish throne at a meeting in Vadstena, though he still retains power in Denmark and Norway.
- August – Portuguese explorer Gil Eanes and his crew sail around the dangerous Cape Bojador of North Africa (off of Western Sahara) and survive, becoming the first Europeans to make the voyage and ending the legends about what lies on the other side of the "Dark Sea". The achievement is a breakthrough in trade between Europe and Asia.
- September 29 – Pope Eugene IV issues the papal bull Regimini gregis, condemning the enslavement by the Kingdom of Castile of the Guanches, the indigenous people of the Canary Islands. An order to free the slaves follows three months later.

==== October–December ====
- October 6 – Cosimo de' Medici returns to Florence, one year after being exiled by the Albizzi and Strozzi faction.
- October 21 – The University of Catania is founded in Italy.
- November 12 –
  - René of Anjou becomes the new Count of Provence and Duke of Anjou, as well as a claimant to the title of King of Naples, upon the death of his brother, Louis III.
  - Bishop Nils Ragvaldsson of Sweden delivers a speech at the Council of Basel, arguing the Kingdom of Sweden and its monarch, Eric of Pomerania deserve senior rank over the Spanish delegation.
- December 17 – Pope Eugene IV issues the papal bull Creator Omnium, directing the freedom of the Canary Island slaves within 15 days after the bull is received.

==== Date unknown ====
- Jan van Eyck paints the Arnolfini Portrait.
- In Ming Dynasty China, a long episode of drought, flood, locust infestation, and famine cripple agriculture and commerce in areas throughout the country, until 1448.

=== 1435 ===
==== January–March ====
- January 11 – Sweden's first Riksdag of the Estates is summoned under rebel leader Engelbrekt Engelbrektsson, who is elected rikshövitsman (military commander of the realm), in the absence of a king, on January 13.
- January 13 – Sicut Dudum, a papal bull forbidding the enslavement of the Guanche natives in Canary Islands by the Spanish, is promulgated by Pope Eugene IV.
- January 31 – China's Emperor Xuanzong dies after a nine-year reign, leaving a question of whether his younger brother Zhu Zhanshan, or his 7-year-old son, Crown Prince Zhu Qizhen, should be the successor.
- February 2 – The Kingdom of Naples passes to René of Anjou.
- February 7 – Prince Zhu Qizhen is formally enthroned as the Emperor Yingzong of Ming dynasty China at the age of 8, although his grandmother, the Empress Chengxiaozhao, effectively rules the Empire in his name. The accession of Yingzong begins the Zhengtong Era.–
- March 8 – Prince Zhu Qiyu, who will become the Emperor of China in 1449, is appointed as the Prince of Cheng in the name of the Emperor Yingzong of Ming.
- March 15 – Stjepan Vukčić Kosača becomes the new Grand Duke of Bosnia upon the death of his uncle, Sandalj Hranić.

==== April–June ====
- April 13 – In Germany, Frederick II, Elector of Brandenburg becomes the direct administrator of the Duchy of Pomerania-Stettin upon the death of Casmir V, and acts as regent for Casimir's 8-year-old son, Joachim of Griffin.
- May 8 – The German city of Speyer sets a six-month deadline for its Jewish community to leave, as the council passes a decree declaring that "The council is compelled to banish the Jews, but it has no designs upon their lives or their property. It only revokes their rights of citizenship and of settlement. Until November 11 they are at liberty to go whither they please with all their property, and in the meantime they may make final disposition of their business affairs."
- May 9 – The French Army, led by Jean Poton de Xaintrailles and Étienne de Vignolles ("La Hire") wins the Battle of Gerberoy, despite being outnumbered 3 to 1 by the English Army under John FitzAlan. the French lose no more than 30 soldiers while the English lose over 1,000, including FitzAlan, who is fatally wounded and died on June 12.
- June 1 – The Siege of Paris begins as the French royalists of King Charles VII attempt to retake control of the French capital, defended by the supporters of England's King Henry VI. The siege lasts for 10 months but Paris is surrendered to the royalists on April 17.

==== July–September ====
- July 5 – The regency for King Henry VI summons the members of the English Parliament, directing them to assemble at Westminster on October 10.
- July 17 – Peace of Vordingborg is signed, ending the war between the Hanseatic League of German cities (Hamburg, Lübeck, Lüneburg, Rostock, Stralsund and Wismar) and the Scandinavian Kalmar Union of Denmark and Sweden. King Eric VII of Denmark and Adolph VIII, Count of Holstein sign, along with Hein Hoyer, representing the League, at Vordingborg Castle. Denmark cedes the Duchy of Schleswig to Holstein and agrees to stop interfering with the League, to end ten years of war.
- August 4 – The Battle of Podraga is fought to a draw between the two claimants to the throne of Moldavia, Iliaș and Stephen II, sons of the late voivode Alexander the Good, begin joint rule of Moldavia after intervention by the King of Poland.
- August 5 – In the Battle of Ponza, the navy of the Duchy of Milan decisively defeats King Alfonso V of Aragon who is captured.
- September 1 – In the Battle of Wiłkomierz, Grand Duke Sigismund Kęstutaitis decisively defeats defeats his predecessor, Švitrigaila, in the decisive battle of the civil war in the Grand Duchy of Lithuania.
- September 21 – The Treaty of Arras between Charles VII of France and Philip III of Burgundy ends the English-Burgundian alliance.

==== October–December ====
- October 10 – As the English Parliament opens, the English House of Commons elects John Tyrrell as its speaker.
- October 14 – Eric of Pomerania is reinstated as king of Sweden, only briefly, however, he is once again deposed in January of the following year.
- November 16 – The French port of Dieppe, occupied by the English Army since its capture in 1420, is retaken by French royalists led by Charles Desmarais and Pierre de Rieux.
- December 4 – The Livonian Confederation, with a capital at Valka (now on the border of Latvia and Lithuania) is formed by an agreement signed at Valka by the Archbishop of Riga; Courland; the Dorpat; the Ösel–Wiek and bishops of Courland, Dorpat, Ösel-Wiek and Reval; the representatives of the Livonian Order and its vassals; and the deputies of Riga, Reval and Dorpat city municipal councils.
- December 23 – As the English Parliament closes, King Henry VI's regents give royal assent to new legislation, including the Safe Conducts Act 1435, the Wools and Fells Act (directing that wool not be exported from England to any other location except Calais), and the Alien Goods Act (subtitled "Merchandises taken in Ships of the King's Enemies, though belonging to Foreigners in Amity with the King, shall not be restored")
- December 31 – The Peace of Brześć Kujawski is signed by representatives of the State of the Teutonic Order to make peace with the Kingdom of Poland and the Grand Duchy of Lithuania to end the Polish–Teutonic War, with the Teutonic Order agreeing to end its support of the former Grand Duke Svitrigaila and to not interfere further with Polish and Lithuanian affairs.

==== Date unknown ====
- Francis of Paola founds the Order of the Minims in Italy.
- China returns to a policy of isolation.
- Gil Eanes and Afonso Gonçalves Baldaia explore the coast of Africa, as far as the Angra dos Ruivos (in modern-day Western Sahara).
- Enea Piccolomini, the future Pope Pius II, is sent by Cardinal Albergati on a secret mission to Scotland and Northern England.

=== 1436 ===
==== January–March ====
- January 11 – Erik of Pomerania is deposed from the Swedish throne for the second time, only three months after having been reinstated. Engelbrekt Engelbrektsson remains the leader of the land, in his capacity of rikshövitsman, the military commander of the realm.
- February 14 – In Yemen, the Imam Al-Mansur Ali bin Salah ad-Din of the Zaidi state becomes of one of the victims of a plague sweeping the kingdom. His son, an-Nasir Muhammad, becomes the new Imam but dies four weeks later.
- February – Karl Knutsson Bonde becomes the Rikshövitsman of the Swedish military jointly with Engelbrekt. The two will share the title until Engelbrekt's death two months later.
- March 21 – Italian archaeologist Cyriacus of Ancona, exploring at the Greek village of Kastri) rediscovers the site of Delphi, eight centuries after it had been abandoned. More than four more centuries will pass before the ruins of the Temple of Apollo, the workplace of the Oracle of Delphi, will be found.
- March 25 (New Year's Day in local calendars) – Pope Eugene IV consecrates Florence Cathedral. Construction had started 140 years earlier in 1296 and is nearly complete with the finishing of a dome that has been engineered by Filippo Brunelleschi. The dome itself would be dedicated five months later.
- March 28 – In Italy, the Republic of Genoa is revived after having been under the control of the Duchy of Milan for almost 15 years, and the 56-year-old mercenary leader Isnardo Guarco is elected as the Doge of Genoa, with a lifetime appointment, but is deposed only one week later.

==== April–July ====
- April 4 – After entering the city of Genoa with several thousand men, former Doge Tomaso di Campofregoso reclaims leadership of the Republic of Genoa.
- April 17 – Hundred Years War: Paris is recaptured from the English by French forces.
- May 4 – Swedish leader Engelbrekt Engelbrektsson is assassinated by aristocrat Måns Bengtsson while he is on his way to Stockholm for negotiations. Karl Knutsson Bonde temporarily holds the position of leader of Sweden alone. The first meeting of the Riksdag of the Estates of Sweden takes place afterwards, in Uppsala.
- June 25
  - Scottish princess Margaret Stewart marries the future French king Louis XI in Tours.
  - The Incorporated Guild of Smiths in Newcastle upon Tyne (England) is founded.

==== July–September ====
- July 5 – The Hussite Wars effectively end in Bohemia. Sigismund is accepted as King.
- July 29 – French forces abandon their Siege of Calais.
- August 30 – Brunelleschi's Dome at Florence Cathedral is dedicated.
- August 31 – An attempt by Spain to recapture Gibraltar from the Moors fails as the expedition leader Enrique Pérez de Guzmán drowns along with 40 of his men after reaching the shore.
- September 1 – Eric of Pomerania is once again reinstated as king of Sweden. Karl Knutsson, at the same time, resigns the post of rikshövitsman.
- September 10 – At the Battle of Piperdean, fought near the border between Scotland and England, a force of 4,000 English troops led by the George de Dunbar and the Earl of Northumberland to take back Dunbar Castle is repelled by the Earl of Angus, who as Warden of the Scottish Marches. The Scots surprise the marching English troops and kill an estimated 1,500 men, including 40 knights, while losing 200 men of their own.
- September 15 – Pope Eugene IV issues a supplement to his papal bull of 1435, Sicut dudum (which banned enslavement by Portugal of the people of the Canary Islands), by another bull, Romanus Pontifex, allowing Portugal to conquer any of the Islands that had not yet been converted to Christianity.

==== October–December ====
- October 1 – King James I of Scotland gives royal assent to numerous acts recently passed by the Scottish parliament, including the Place of Trial Act ("That the kingis Justice hald the law quhair the trespes wes done."), the Englishmen Act ("of assoverance and proteccion be Inglismen"), the Selling Salmon to English Men Act and the Import of Bullion Act.
- October 6 – The University of Turin, originally created in 1404 is re-established in Turin in Italy after having been absent since 1427. Prince Ludovico of Savoy grants ducal licenses to set up colleges of Law, of Arts and Medicine, and of Theology.
- October 29 – The regents for King Henry VI summon members of the English Parliament to assemble on January 21 at Westminster.
- November 10 – The treaty between the Republic of Venice and the Byzantine Empire is renewed for five years in a signing at Constantinople.
- December 20 – King Charles VII of France arrives at Lyon to personally begin an inquiry into the rebellion that had lasted in the city for two months, ending on June 6, 1436. Ultimately, three rebels are executed and 120 others are permanently banished from Lyon.
- December 30 – In the Holy Roman Empire, at Heidelberg, 13-year-old Ludwig IV of Wittelsbach becomes the new Elector of Palatine, one of the seven imperial electors and ruler of the Rhineland, upon the death of his father, Ludwig III. During his minority, Ludwig IV is guided by his uncle and guardian, Otto of Mosbach.

==== Date unknown ====
- Vlad II Dracul seizes the recently vacated throne of Wallachia, with Hungarian support.
- The Bosnian language is first mentioned in a document.
- Date of the Visokom papers, the last direct sources on the old town of Visoki.
- In Ming dynasty China, the inauguration of the Zhengtong-era Emperor Yingzong of Ming takes place.
- In Ming dynasty China, a significant portion of the southern grain tax is commuted to payments in silver, known as the Gold Floral Silver (jinhuayin). This comes about due to officials' and military generals' increasing demands to be paid in silver instead of grain, as commercial transactions draw more silver into nationwide circulation. Some counties have trouble transporting all the required grain to meet their tax quotas, so it makes sense to pay the government in silver, a medium of exchange that is already abundant amongst landowners, through their own private commercial affairs.
- The Florentine polymath Leon Battista Alberti begins writing the treatise On Painting, in which he argues for the importance of mathematical perspective, in the creation of three-dimensional vision on a two-dimensional plane. This follows the ideas of Masaccio, and his concepts of linear perspective and vanishing point in artwork.
- Afonso Gonçalves Baldaia becomes the first European to explore the western coast of Africa, past the Tropic of Cancer.
- Johannes Gutenberg begins work on the printing press.

=== 1437 ===
==== January–March ====
- January 15– The Compacts of Basel are ratified by the Council of Basel in Switzerland, as the Roman Catholic Church ends its campaign against the Hussites. Among other things, the Church authorizes Hussite priests to administer sacramental wine to their congregations as part of the Communion during the Eucharist before Easter without declaring the same to be heresy, but stops short of allowing the Communion wafer.
- January 17 – Battle of Hällaskogen, Sweden: Rebels from the cities of Arboga, Köping, and Örebro, led by Erik Puke, defeat the troops sent by King Charles VIII of Sweden. Puke is captured a few weeks later, and beheaded on February 13.
- January 21– The English Parliament, summoned in the name of King Henry VI on October 29, assembles at Westminster. The House of Commons elects the ailing John Tyrrell as its Speaker.
- February 13– In France, English troops led by the Earl of Shrewsbury capture the town of Pontoise, less than 18 miles (29 km) from Paris, and threaten the royal capital before being forced to abandon their position.
- February 21– King James I of Scotland is assassinated in an attempted coup d'état led by his uncle and former ally, Walter Stewart, Earl of Atholl. The night before, the King and his wife, Catherine Douglas had stopped at Blackfriars monastery in Perth. Queen Catherine is injured while barring the door with her arm in order to allow the King to escape, and King James is found in the early hours of the morning and stabbed to death while trying to escape.
- March 11– The nova Scorpii AD 1437 is first observed, and is seen by Korean astronomers at Seoul. It remains visible until March 25.
- March 24– In Italy, Tomaso di Campofregoso, the Doge of the Republic of Genoa is forced to step down in favor of his brother, Battista di Campofregoso, however, changes his mind later in the day and Tomaso is re-installed as the doge.
- March 25 – In a ceremony in Holyrood Abbey, six-year old Prince James is crowned as James II of Scotland by Pope Eugene IV. For the security of the crown, the capital of Scotland is moved from Dunfermline to Edinburgh.
- March 26 – In Scotland, Walter Stewart, Earl of Atholl, at one time the heir presumptive to the Scottish throne until the birth of James II, is brutally executed for the assassination of King James I. A red hot iron crown placed upon his head, after which he is cut into pieces while still alive and his heart was taken out, after which his body is thrown into a fire.
- March 27 – The regents for King Henry VI give royal assent to the legislation passed by the English Parliament, including the Marshalsea Act; the Exportation of Corn Act (excusing licensing fees of small amounts of grain, at less than 6 shillings, 8 pence for wheat or 3 shillings for barley); and the Guilds and Fraternities Act.

==== April–June ====
- April 2 – A bubonic plague epidemic strikes the independent city of Ragusa (modern-day Dubrovnik in Croatia), capital of the Republic of Ragusa, and a group of 10 patricians reject the chance to flee, staying to govern the city. Within 15 days, nine of the ten are dead, and only Marin Simunov Rastic survives. The progress of the plague, which lasts for more than two months, is chronicled by an Italian-born resident, Opis Diversis.
- April 23 – Malmö, at this time in Denmark, receives its current coat of arms.
- April 23 – Pope Eugene IV issues the papal bull Dominatur Dominus, further to safeguard the rights of the Guanches, the natives of the Portuguese-controlled Canary Islands.
- May 1 – In Bohemia, Sion Castle near Kutná Hora in the modern-day Czech Republic is besieged by royal forces sent by the Emperor Sigismund of Luxembourg and commanded by his Hofmeister, Hynce Ptáček of Pirkštejn. The siege, defended by the Taborite Hussite Jan Roháč of Dubá, lasts for four months before succeeding.
- May 18 (Full moon of Nayon 799 M.E.) – In Burma, King Mohnyin Thado of Ava announces that, effective March 30, 1438, the year will be recalibrated after 799 M.E. to will become 2 M.E., as part of the recommendations of his astrologers.
- May 21 – During a visit by Phillip III of Burgundy, who still controls parts of France while his war against King Charles VI continues, rebels in the city of Bruges take over and lynch his representative, Marshal Jean de Villiers de L'Isle-Adam, while Philip himself narrowly escapes capture.
- June 6 – A peasant army gathers at Babolna during the Transylvanian peasant revolt against King Sigismund of Hungary and defeat the Hungarian Governor, Ladislaus Csaki.
- June 24 – On the feast day of St. John the Baptist, the plague in Ragusa is declared at an end.

==== July–September ====
- July 6– The Transylvanian peasant revolt comes to an end with a formal treaty signed at the monastery of Cluj-Manastur, reducing the tithe to be paid to their employers, and abolishing the tax requiring surrendering one-ninth of each individual's production of wine and grain, and confirming the right of peasants to move freely within Transylvania.
- August 22– Portugal's disastrous Tangier expedition to attack Morocco begins as Prince Henry the Navigator and more than 6,000 troops (3,000 knights, 2,000 infantry, 1,000 archers) sail from the port of Belém toward Africa and the Portuguese colony of Ceuta. They arrive at Ceuta five days later.
- September 20–
  - Led by Prince Henry the Navigator, a poorly-prepared Portuguese attempt to conquer the city of Tangier in the Marinid Sultanate in Morocco begins. Although the Portuguese have more than 6,000 troops, they reach the walled city and find that their scaling ladders are too short to reach the top, and their artillery is too weak to damage the walls.
  - The siege of Sion Castle in Bohemia by the armies of the Emperor Sigismund of Luxembourg is successful.
- September 30– A Moroccan relief force of at least 10,000 cavalry and 90,000 foot soldiers arrives at Tangier to halt Portugal's assault on Tangier.

==== October–December ====
- October 5 – The Portuguese, reinforced with better equipment and having routed the Moroccans two days earlier, make a second assault on Tangier and fail.
- October 9 – A counterattack on the Portuguese troops' camp, with additional troops led by the Moroccan grand vizier, Abu Zakariya Yahya al-Wattasi, forces the Portuguese to flee to their ships but King Henry's son, Prince Ferdinand, is taken as a prisoner of war.
- October 15 – Prince Henry the Navigator (Henrique, o Navegador), brother of King Duarte of Portugal, agrees on behalf Portugal to cede its North African colony of Ceuta back to Morocco in return for being allowed to withdraw all of his troops, including those taken prisoner.
- October 19 – After negotiating a surrender and exchanging prisoners of war with the Moroccans, the Portuguese troops leave Tangier and sail away from Morocco.
- November 1 – On All Saints Day, five weeks before his 16th birthday, King Henry VI of England has a second coronation ceremony at Merton Priory, near London. Henry had previously been crowned in 1429 at Westminster at the age of seven.
- November 12 – King Charles VII of France and his son Prince Louis ride into Paris for the first time in 17 years after the royal family had fled from the invasion by the Duke of Burgundy in 1420.
- November 13 – England's Privy Council votes to confirm the independent authority of King Henry.
- December 6 – King Henry VI reaches the age of majority on his 16th birthday and is deemed ready to rule the Kingdom of England in his own right.
- December 9 – Sigismund, Holy Roman Emperor, dies, and is succeeded by Frederick III.

==== Date unknown ====
- Sandside Chase in the north of Scotland: Clan Mackay defeat the Clan Gunn of Caithness.
- The Kazan Khanate is established.
- Ulugh Beg's Zij-i Sultani star catalogue is published.

=== 1438 ===
==== January–March ====
- January 1 – Albert II of Habsburg is crowned as King of Hungary at Székesfehérvár.
- January 8 – Upset at the attempted reforms at the Council of Basel in Switzerland, Pope Eugene IV convenes a rival council at Ferrara in Italy, through Niccolò Albergati, the Roman Catholic Bishop of Bologna, with 40 prelates in attendance.
- January 9 – The city of Cluj (Kolozsvár) is conquered, thus marking the end of the Transylvanian peasant revolt, which started at Bobâlna.
- January 24 – The Council of Basel, with only 16 bishops present, votes to suspend Pope Eugene from papal authority.
- February 2 – The Unio Trium Nationum pact is established in Transylvania.
- February 10 – All Souls' College is founded in the University of Oxford by Henry Chichele, Archbishop of Canterbury, and Henry VI of England as a graduate institution.
- February 15 – Pope Eugene issues the bull "Exposcit debitum", declaring the council at Ferrara an ecumenical council, and commanding the prelates at Basel to appear at Ferrara within a month or face excommunication.
- March 17 – Albert II of Germany is approved by the electors in the Holy Roman Empire as the King of the Romans, the ruler of Germany.

==== April–June ====
- April 14 – The County of Holland declares war on several cities of the Hanseatic League, triggering the Dutch–Hanseatic War.
- May 6 – Albert becomes King of Bohemia.
- May 19 – René of Anjou, son of the late King Louis II of Valois-Anjou arrives in the Kingdom of Naples to take the vacant throne, reaching the Italian city ahead of King Alfonso V of Aragon, who also wants the throne. Alfonso makes plans to lay siege to the city of Naples.
- June 7 – Upon the death of Al-Ashraf Sayf ad-Dīn Barsbāy, the Mamluk Sultan of Egypt and Syria, his 14 year old son Al-Aziz Jamal al-Din Yusuf temporarily becomes the new monarch, under the guardianship of the regent Sayf al-Din Jaqmaq, Na'ib of Damascus.
- June 29 – The coronation of Albert II of Habsburg as King of Bohemia takes place in Prague.

==== July–September ====
- July 7 – Charles VII of France issues the Pragmatic Sanction of Bourges, giving the French church control over the appointment of bishops, and depriving the Pope of French ecclesiastical revenues.
- August 20 – The reign of Friedrich I von Helfenstein as Count of Helfenstein (in the modern-day German state of Baden-Württemberg) ends after 66 years. Friedrich and his brothers Conrad and Ulrich had become joint rulers in 1372 on the death of their father, Ulrich XIII, but Ulrich IX and Conrad I had died in 1375 and 1402, respectively. Friedrich's three sons become the joint rulers.
- September 9 – In Cairo, Sayf al-Din Jaqmaq becomes the new Sultan of Egypt and Syria, deposing the young Sultan Al-Aziz Jamal al-Din Yusuf, whom he has arrested and then deported to Alexandria.
- September 13 – Afonso V becomes King of Portugal upon the death of his father King Duarte I.

==== October–December ====
- October 17 – Eric of Pomerania, King of Sweden, Denmark and Norway, loses direct control of Sweden, as Karl Knutsson Bonde is elected Regent of Sweden.
- October 27 – At Mandore (part of the modern-day state of Rajasthan in India), Rao Ranmal, King of Marwar is assassinated after becoming drunk during the festival of Diwali, when one of his wives, Bharmali, ties him up and opens his bedroom door to admit a team of assassins. Ranmal's son, Rao Jodha, becomes the new King.
- November 27 – Following approval by the General Council of Scotland, regents for King James II of Scotland give royal assent to the Inquisitions in Last Reign Act, providing for the continuation of any inquisition by the Roman Catholic Church for heresy that had been started prior to the assassination of King James I.
- December 8 – In Ming dynasty China, the Emperor Yingzong gives the order to his General, Mu Sheng, to go to war against the state of the Dai people (on the border with the Burmese Kingdom of Ava)and their ruler, King Möng Mao.
- December 13 – The siege of Brescia in Italy, started on September 25 by troops of the Duchy of Milan under condottieri Niccolò Piccinino to liberate the city from its control by the Republic of Venice, is raised after the arrival of Scaramuccia da Forlì. According to tradition, two Brescian martyrs from the second century, Saints Faustinus and Jovita, appear on the top of the city walls and repel the cannonballs fired at the city, and the Milanese abandon the siege.

==== Date unknown ====
- According to John Rowe's chronology, Pachacuti becomes ruler of the Kingdom of Cusco and begins its expansion into the Inca Empire (Tahuantinsuyu).
- At 95 years of age, Nang Keo Phimpha becomes queen of Lan Xang for a few months before being deposed and killed.
- Just two years after the Ming dynasty court of China allowed landowners paying the grain tax to pay their tax in silver instead, the Ming court now decides to close all silver mines and prohibit all private silver mining in Zhejiang and Fujian provinces. This is a concerted effort to halt the increase of silver circulating into the market. The illegal mining of silver is now an offense punishable by death; although it becomes a dangerous affair, the high demand for silver also makes it very lucrative, and so many chose to defy the government and continue to mine.
- The Sukhothai Kingdom merges with the Ayutthaya Kingdom.

=== 1439 ===
==== January–March ====
- January 4 – A truce is signed at Breslau between King Albert of Hungary and King Casimir IV of Poland to end the 8-month war between the two kingdoms.
- January 9 – A rebellion by peasants in Finland against the Swedish government, led by Anian Daavid, is ended by the Swedish Army after intervention by the Bishop of Turku. After confiscation of some untillable land to compensate other landowners for damages, the peasants are pardoned upon taking an oath never to rise up against the Swedish Crown again.
- January 10 – Pope Eugene IV, who had convened the Council of Ferrara a year earlier to fight the reforms of the Council of Basel, orders the transfer of its participants from Ferrara to Florence.
- January 17 – As part of Ming China's campaign against the Möng Mao kingdom in south China, General Fang Zheng, commander of 295,000 troops, attacks the stockade of the Mao kingdom's General Si Renfa and forces the enemy to retreat southward, after which he continues in pursuit. However, by this time his troops are exhausted and his supply lines are cut off. He requests reinforcements, but Mu Sheng sends only a small number as he is angry that Fang Zheng has disobeyed orders. Fang Zheng is then defeated at Kongni where he has pursued Si Renfa, and "fell into an ambush of the elephant phalanx of his enemy", at which point he orders his son to escape, and dies with his troops
- January 20 – In England, John Juyn becomes the new Chief Justice of the King's Bench.
- January – In Vietnam, a rebellion of the barbarians in Phục Lễ province, supported by the Laotian army, against King Lê Thái Tông under the Lê dynasty, is defeated.
- February 17 – In the Duchy of Cieszyn in Poland, Duke Wenceslaus I marries Elisabeth of Hohenzollern, the daughter of the Elector of Brandenburg, Friedrich.
- March 19 – Aedh mac Tairdelbach becomes the new King of Connacht (in modern-day County Roscommon) in Ireland upon the death of his nephew, Cathal mac Ruaidri Ó Conchobair, who had been King of Connacht since 1426.
- March 26 – Meeting in Germany, the Diet of Mainz, summoned by the new Holy Roman Emperor, Frederick III, to consider the case of Pope Eugene IV, votes to deprive Eugene of his authority within the Empire and to elect a new Diet to meet in Frankfurt in 1440.

==== April–June ====
- April 12 – In a battle on Lake Garda in Italy, a passage to the Adriatic Sea, ships from the Duchy of Milan defeat those of the Republic of Venice in battle and take control of the lake.
- May 6 – Battle of Grotnik: Wladyslaw III's royal army defeats the Hussite rebels, led by Spytko III of Melsztyn, ending the non-Catholic movement in Poland.
- May 16 – Pope Eugene, already found to be in contempt of the Council of Basel, is declared by the Council to be a heretic.
- June 10 – Joseph II, the leader of the Eastern Orthodox Church as the 155th Ecumenical Patriarch of Constantinople, dies after a reign of 23 years, leaving a vacancy that is used by the Roman Catholic Pope Eugene IV to declare a unification of the two churches to end the East–West Schism of 1054.
- June 24 – Sigismund of Habsburg becomes the new Duke of Austria upon the death of his father, Frederick IV.
- June 25 – The Council of Basel formally declares that Pope Eugene IV is deposed.
- June – The "Miracle of the Moose" takes place, according to Russian hagiographers.

==== July–September ====
- July 6 – Pope Eugene IV issues the Bull of Union with the Greeks (Laetentur Caeli), signed by the Byzantine Emperor John VIII Palaiologos, proclaiming the end of the East–West Schism between Roman Catholicism and Eastern Orthodoxy and the union of the two divisions of the Christian faith. The bull is repudiated by most Eastern bishops shortly thereafter.
- July 9 – The Battle of Craignaught Hill takes place in Scotland between Clan Boyd and Clan Stewart as the Stewarts of Darnley carry out revenge against Sir Thomas Boyd for his murder of Alan Stewart.
- July 13 – The siege of Moscow by Ulugh Muhammad, the monarch of the Kazan Khanate, fails after 10 days following the defense of the Muscovite capital by Yuri Patrikeevich.
- August 18 – Smederevo Fortress, the seat of government of the Despotate of Serbia, surrenders to the Ottoman Empire after a siege of three months under the command of the Sultan Murad II. The siege had started after the Despot, Durad Branković, had departed to the Republic of Venice, leaving the nation under the control of his son, Grgur Branković. Grgur is appointed as the Ottoman Governor of the Serbian province.
- August 28 – Pope Eugene IV sends a message of unity to the Emperor of Ethiopia, Qostantinos I, but the proposal for a union with the Ethiopian Orthodox Christian Church is not acknowledged.
- September 8 – Cardinal Giovanni Vitelleschi captures Foligno, ending Trinci's signoria.
- September 20 – In the modern-day Indian state of Rajasthan, Raja Udharan becomes the new King of Amber upon the death of the Raja Banbir.
- September 24 - King Erik XIII of Sweden is declared deposed in Sweden while Karl Knutsson Bonde continues to serve as Regent of Sweden. Erik remains King of Norway.
- September 25 – King Henry VI of England summons the English Parliament, directing all members to assemble at Westminster on November 12.

==== October–December ====
- October 30 – The Council of Basel begins a conclave to elect its own successor to Pope Eugene IV, whom it had deposed on June 25.
- November 5 – The Council of Basel elects its own pontiff of the Roman Catholic Church, and selects Amadeus VIII, Duke of Savoy (considered an antipope), who takes the regnal name Felix V.
- November 12 – In England:
  - Parliament is opened and the House of Commons elects William Tresham as its speaker.
  - Plymouth becomes the first town incorporated by Parliament.
- November 22 – Following up on the declaration of union of the Roman Catholic Church with the Greek Orthodox Church, Pope Eugene IV signs an agreement of union with the Armenian Apostolic Church.
- December 18 – Pope Eugene IV designates nine archbishops and six bishops to join the College of Cardinals and one cardinal and one priest, for 17 appointments in all.

==== Date unknown ====
- Johannes Gutenberg develops printing with movable type at Mainz at about this date.
- The Great Ordinance is adopted by the French Estates-General. This measure grants the king the exclusive right to raise troops, and establishes the taxation measure known as the taille, in support of a standing army.
- The Council of Florence is moved to Florence.
- At the Portuguese Cortes, Peter, Duke of Coimbra is appointed Regent of the Kingdom.
- Beginning of the settlement of the Azores with the arrival of the first Portuguese settlers in Santa Maria.

== Births ==
1430

- March 10 – Oliviero Carafa, Italian Catholic cardinal (d. 1511)
- March 23 – Margaret of Anjou, queen of Henry VI of England (d. 1482)
- June 13 – Beatrice, Duchess of Viseu, Portuguese infante (d. 1506)
- June 27 – Henry Holland, 3rd Duke of Exeter, Lancastrian leader during the English Wars of the Roses (d. 1475)
- October 16 – King James II of Scotland (d. 1460) and his twin Alexander Stewart, Duke of Rothesay (d. 1430)
- October 28 – Richard West, 7th Baron De La Warr, English soldier, son of Reginald West (d. 1475)
- November 11 – Jošt of Rožmberk, Bishop of Breslau, Grand Prior of the Order of St. John (d. 1467)
- date unknown
  - Hosokawa Katsumoto, Japanese warlord
  - Barbara von Ottenheim, German alleged witch and sculpture model (d. 1484)
  - Isabel Bras Williamson, Scottish merchant (d. 1493)
  - Joana de Castre, Catalan noble (d. 1480)
- probable – Heinrich Kramer, German churchman and inquisitor (d. 1505)
- approximate – Clara Hätzlerin, German scribe (d. 1476)

1431

- January 1 – Pope Alexander VI (d. 1503)
- October 26 – Ercole I d'Este, Duke of Ferrara, Italian politician (d. 1505)
- November or December – Vlad III the Impaler, Prince of Wallachia (d. 1476)
- date unknown
  - William Elphinstone, Scottish statesman (d. 1514)
  - Helena Palaiologina, Despotess of Serbia (d. 1473)
  - Ladislaus Hunyadi, Hungarian statesman and warrior (d. 1457)
- probable
  - William Hastings, 1st Baron Hastings (d. 1483)
  - John Neville, 1st Marquess of Montagu, English politician (d. 1471)
  - François Villon, French poet
  - Vlad III, Prince of Wallachia, A member of the House of Drăculești, as well as the Voivode of Wallachia 1456-1462

1432

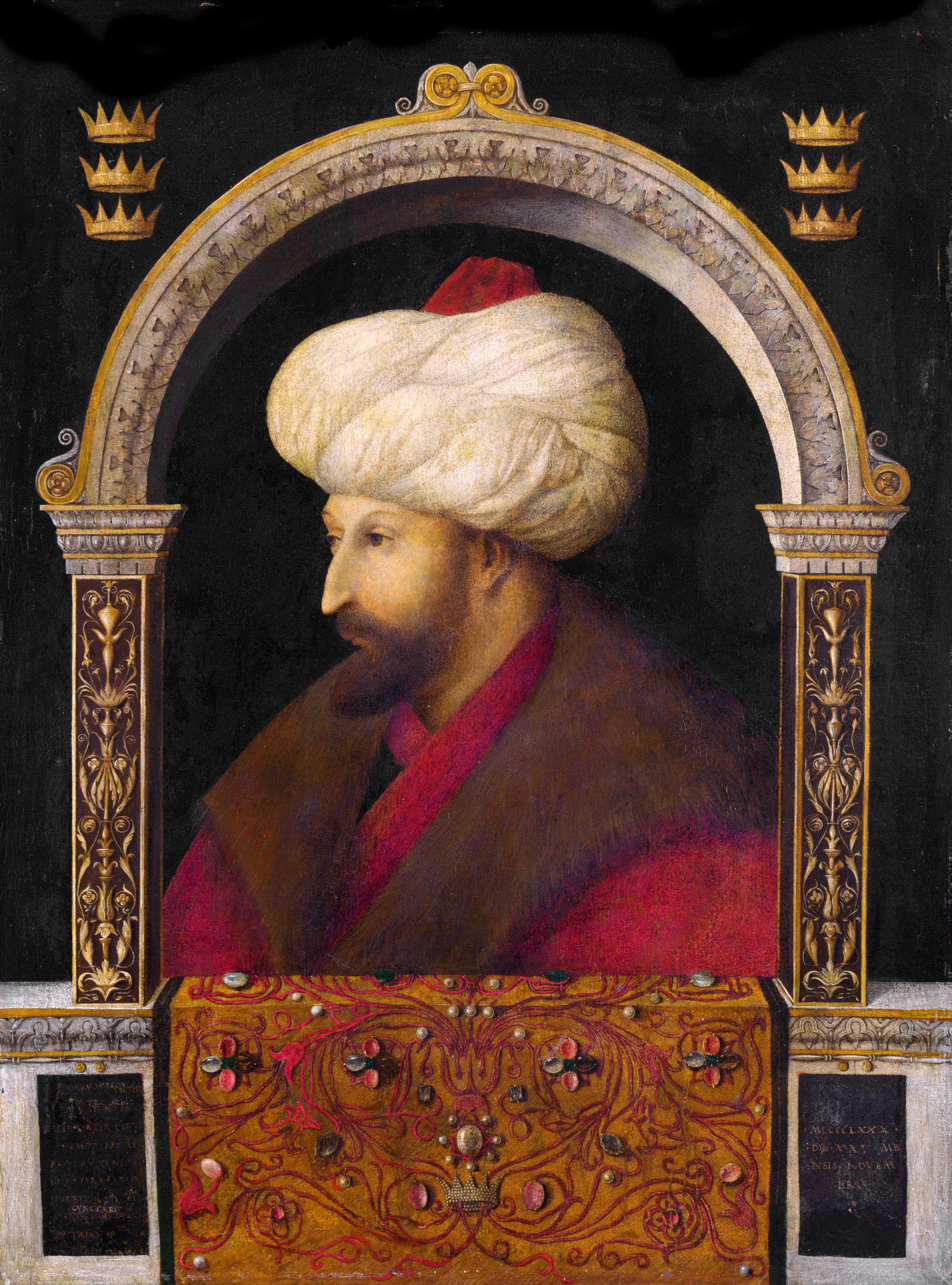
Mehmed II, the Conqueror

- January 15 – King Afonso V of Portugal (d. 1481)
- March 1 – Isabella of Coimbra, Portuguese infanta (d. 1455)
- March 2 – Countess Palatine Margaret of Mosbach, Countess consort of Hanau (d. 1457)
- March 30 – Mehmed II, the Conqueror, Ottoman Sultan (d. 1481)
- April 12 – Anne of Austria, Landgravine of Thuringia, consort of William III, Landgrave of Thuringia (d. 1462)
- August 15 – Luigi Pulci, Italian poet (d. 1484)
- date unknown – Pope Innocent VIII (d. 1492)
- probable – Alvise Cadamosto, Italian explorer (d. 1488)

1433

- August 31 – Sigismondo d'Este, Italian nobleman (d. 1507)
- September 17 – James of Portugal, Portuguese cardinal (d. 1459)
- September 24 – Shekha of Amarsar, Rajput chieftain (d. 1488)
- September 27 – Stanisław Kazimierczyk, Polish canon regular and saint (d. 1489)
- October 19 – Marsilio Ficino, Florentine philosopher (d. 1499)
- November 10
  - Charles the Bold, Duke of Burgundy (d. 1477)
  - Jeanne de Laval, French noble, queen consort of Naples (d. 1498)
- date unknown
  - Stephen III of Moldavia, prince from 1457 (d. 1504)
  - Giovanni Giocondo, Veronese-born friar, architect and classical scholar (d. 1515)
- probable – Kettil Karlsson, regent of Sweden from 1464 (d. 1465)

1434

- January 7 – Adolf, Duke of Bavaria (d. 1441)
- March 12 – William III, Count of Henneberg-Schleusingen (d. 1480)
- March 19 – Ashikaga Yoshikatsu, Japanese shōgun (d. 1443)
- March 25 – Eustochia Smeralda Calafato, Italian saint (d. 1485)
- June 13 – Cristoforo della Rovere, Roman Catholic cardinal (d. 1478)
- September 18 – Eleanor of Portugal, Holy Roman Empress (d. 1467)
- September 23 – Yolande of Valois, Duchess consort of Savoy (d. 1478)
- December 28 – Antonio Grimani, Italian admiral (d. 1523)
- probable
  - Antoinette de Maignelais, mistress of Charles VII of France (d. 1474)
  - Isabella of Bourbon, Burgundian countess, spouse of Charles the Bold (d. 1465)
  - Matteo Maria Boiardo, Italian poet (d. 1494)
  - Kano Masanobu, Japanese painter (d. 1530)

1435

- January 20 – Ashikaga Yoshimasa, shōgun (d. 1490)
- February 1 – Amadeus IX, Duke of Savoy (d. 1472)
- April 8 – John Clifford, 9th Baron de Clifford, English noble (d. 1461)
- April 16 – Jan II the Mad, Duke of Żagań (1439–1449 and 1461–1468 and again in 1472) (d. 1504)
- May 4 – Joan of France, Duchess of Bourbon, French princess (d. 1482)
- October 24 – Andrea della Robbia, Italian artist (d. 1525)
- date unknown
  - Yoshida Kanetomo, Shinto priest (d. 1511)
  - Jean Molinet, French poet and chronicler (d. 1507)
  - Kim Si-sŭp, Korean scholar and author (d. 1493)
  - Sophie of Pomerania, Duchess of Pomerania (d. 1497)
  - Thomas Stanley, 1st Earl of Derby (d. 1504)
- probable
  - Johannes Tinctoris, Flemish music theorist and composer (approximate date; d. 1511)
  - Andrea del Verrocchio, Florentine sculptor (approximate date; d. 1488)

1436

- January 20 – Ashikaga Yoshimasa, Japanese shōgun (d. 1490)
- January 26 – Henry Beaufort, 3rd Duke of Somerset, Lancastrian military commander during the English Wars of the Roses (d. 1464)
- February 26 – Imagawa Yoshitada, 9th head of the Imagawa clan in Japan (d. 1476)
- April 4 – Amalia of Saxony, Duchess of Bavaria-Landshut (d. 1501)
- June 6 – Regiomontanus, German astronomer (d. 1476)
- November 5 – Richard Grey, 3rd Earl of Tankerville, English nobleman, attainted as a Yorkist supporter during the Wars of the Roses (d. 1466)
- November 16 – Leonardo Loredan, Doge of Venice (d. 1521)
- November 26 – Princess Catherine of Portugal, nun and writer (d. 1463)
- date unknown
  - Sheikh Hamdullah, Anatolian Islamic calligrapher (d. 1520)
  - Francisco Jiménez de Cisneros, Spanish cardinal and statesman (d. 1517)
  - Hernando del Pulgar, Spanish writer (d. c. 1492)
  - Abi Ahmet Celebi, chief physician of the Ottoman Empire (writer of a study on kidney and bladder stones; supporter of the research of Jewish doctor Musa Colinus ul-Israil on the application of drugs; founder of the first Ottoman medical school)

1437

- March 7 – Anna of Saxony, Electress of Brandenburg (d. 1512)
- April 30 – János Thurzó, Hungarian businessman (d. 1508)
- July 22 – John Scrope, 5th Baron Scrope of Bolton, English Baron (d. 1498)
- October 4 – John IV, Duke of Bavaria (d. 1463)
- date unknown – Isaac Abravanel, Jewish statesman (d. 1508)
- probable – Elizabeth Woodville, Queen consort of King Edward IV of England (d. 1492)

1438

- February 5
  - Margaret of Bourbon, French noble (d. 1483)
  - Philip II, Duke of Savoy (d. 1497)
- February 12 – Adolf, Duke of Guelders and Count of Zutphen (1465–1471) (d. 1477)
- March 23 – Ludovico II, Marquess of Saluzzo, Italian noble (d. 1504)
- April 3 – John III of Egmont, Dutch noble (d. 1516)
- September 7 – Louis II, Landgrave of Lower Hesse (1458–1471) (d. 1471)
- December 1 – Peter II, Duke of Bourbon, son of Charles I (d. 1503)
- date unknown – Husayn Bayqarah, Timurid ruler of Herat (d. 1506)
- probable – Edmund Beaufort, 4th Duke of Somerset, English nobleman and military commander during the Wars of the Roses (d. 1471)

1439

- March 3 – Ashikaga Yoshimi, brother of Shōgun Ashikaga Yoshimasa (d. 1491)
- April 3 – Ludwig II, Count of Württemberg-Urach, German noble (d. 1457)
- May 29 – Pope Pius III (d. 1503)
- July 18 – John V, Duke of Saxe-Lauenburg, German duke (d. 1507)
- July 26 – Sigismund, Duke of Bavaria, member of the Wittelsbach dynasty (d. 1501)
- August 10 – Anne of York, Duchess of Exeter, Duchess of York, second child of Richard Plantagenet (d. 1476)
- date unknown – Hua Sui, Chinese inventor and printer (d. 1513)

== Deaths ==
1430

- January 5 – Philippa of England, queen consort of Denmark, Norway and Sweden (b. 1394)
- January 29 or 1427 – Andrei Rublev, Russian iconographer (possible date; b. 1360)
- April 18 – John III, Count of Nassau-Siegen, German count
- August 4 – Philip I, Duke of Brabant (b. 1404)
- August 18 – Thomas de Ros, 8th Baron de Ros, English soldier and politician (b. 1406)
- October 27 – Vytautas, Grand Prince of Lithuania (b. 1352)
- date unknown
  - Thomas FitzAlan, English noble
  - Christine de Pizan, Italian proto-feminist writer (b. 1364)

1431

- January 25 – Charles II, Duke of Lorraine (b. 1364)
- February 20 – Pope Martin V (b. 1368)
- April 1 – Nuno Álvares Pereira, Portuguese general and religious figure
- April 5 – Bernard I, Margrave of Baden-Baden (b. 1364)
- April 19 – Adolph III, Count of Waldeck (b. 1362)
- May 30 – Joan of Arc, French soldier and saint (b. c. 1412)
- September 6 – Demetrios Laskaris Leontares, Byzantine soldier and statesman
- December 8 – Hedwig Jagiellon, Polish and Lithuanian princess (b. 1408)
- date unknown
  - Makhdoom Ali Mahimi, Indian Sufi mystic
  - Stanisław of Skarbimierz, Polish theologian (b. 1360)
  - Violant of Bar, queen regent of Aragon (b. 1365)

1432

- January 1 – Alexandru cel Bun, Prince of Moldavia
- January 22 – John of Schoonhoven, Flemish theologian (b. 1356)
- May 5 – Francesco Bussone da Carmagnola, Italian adventurer (executed)
- May 19 – Joan of Valois, Duchess of Alençon, French duchess (b. 1409)
- June 1 – Dan II, former Prince of Wallachia (killed in battle against Ottomans)
- June 13 – Uko Fockena, East Frisian chieftain (b. c. 1408)
- June 29 – Janus of Cyprus (b. 1375)
- October 19 – John de Mowbray, 2nd Duke of Norfolk, English politician (b. 1392)
- November 14 – Anne of Burgundy, Duchess of Bedford (b. 1404)
- date unknown
  - Gyaltsab Je, throne holder of the Gelug tradition of Buddhism (b. 1364)
  - Art Mac Cathmhaoil, Bishop of Clogher
  - Centurione II Zaccaria, last Prince of Achaea, Baron of Arcadia

1433

- April 14 – Lidwina, Dutch saint (b. 1380)
- May 9 – King Min Saw Mon of Arakan
- August 14 – King John I of Portugal (b. 1357)
- August 30 – Peter I, Count of Saint-Pol (b. 1390)
- September – Zweder van Culemborg, Bishop of Utrecht (birth year unknown)
- September 28 – Přemek I, Duke of Opava (b. c.1365)
- December 1 – Emperor Go-Komatsu, the 100th emperor of Japan (b. 1377)

1434

- January – John I, Duke of Bourbon (b. 1381)
- April 20 – Alexandra of Lithuania, Duchess of Masovia
- May 30 – Prokop the Great, Hussite general (b. 1380)
- June – Amda Iyasus, Emperor of Ethiopia
- June 1 – King Wladislaus II of Poland (age unknown)
- June 5 – Yuri IV, Russian grand prince (b. 1374)
- November 12 – King Louis III of Anjou (b. 1403)

1435

- January 31 – Xuande Emperor of China (b. 1399)
- February 2 – Queen Joanna II of Naples (b. 1371)
- March 27 – Spytek z Tarnowa i Jarosławia, Polish nobleman
- June 12 – John FitzAlan, 14th Earl of Arundel, English military leader (b. 1408)
- September 9 – Sir Robert Harling, English knight under the Duke of Bedford
- September 14 – John of Lancaster, 1st Duke of Bedford, regent of England (b. 1389)
- September 24 – Isabeau of Bavaria, queen of Charles VI of France
- September 27 – Savvatiy, Russian monastery founder
- October 9 – Paweł Włodkowic, Polish scholar (b. 1370)
- October 13 – Hermann II of Celje, Ban of Croatia
- December 30 – Bonne of Berry, Regent of Savoy (b. 1362)
- date unknown – Abd al-Qadir Maraghi, musician and artist

1436

- Winter – Alexander I Aldea, Prince of Wallachia (probably of illness) (b.1397)
- May 4 – Engelbrekt Engelbrektsson, Swedish statesman and rebel leader (murdered) (b. c. 1390)
- October 8 – Jacqueline, Countess of Hainaut, Dutch sovereign (b. 1401)
- December 30 – Louis III, Elector Palatine (b. 1378)
- date unknown – Qāḍī Zāda al-Rūmī, Persian mathematician (b. 1364)

1437

- January 3 – Catherine of Valois, queen of Henry V of England (b. 1401)
- January 22 – Niccolò de' Niccoli, Italian Renaissance humanist (b. 1364)
- February 21 – King James I of Scotland (b. 1394) (murdered)
- March 26 – Walter Stewart, Earl of Atholl, Scottish nobleman and regicide (executed)
- June 10 – Joan of Navarre, Queen of England (b. 1370)
- November 20 – Thomas Langley, cardinal bishop of Durham and lord chancellor of England (b. 1363)
- December 9 – Sigismund, Holy Roman Emperor (b. 1368)
- date unknown – John II Stanley of the Isle of Man

1438

- April 24 – Humphrey FitzAlan, 15th Earl of Arundel (b. 1429)
- September 9 – Edward, King of Portugal (b. 1391)
- October 16 – Anne of Gloucester, English noblewoman (b. 1383)
- October 20 – Jacopo della Quercia, Sienese sculptor (b. c. 1374)

1439

- April 30 – Richard de Beauchamp, 13th Earl of Warwick, English military leader (b. 1382)
- June 24 – Duke Frederick IV of Austria (b. 1382)
- September 12 – Sidi El Houari, Algerian imam (b. 1350)
- October 20 – Ambrose the Camaldulian, Italian theologian
- October 27 – Albert II of Germany, Holy Roman Emperor (b. 1397)
- December 30 – Margaret Holland, English noblewoman (b. 1385)
