= 1432 =

1432 in various calendars
- Gregorian calendar: 1432; MCDXXXII
- Ab urbe condita: 2185
- Armenian calendar: 881; ԹՎ ՊՁԱ
- Assyrian calendar: 6182
- Balinese saka calendar: 1353–1354
- Bengali calendar: 838–839
- Berber calendar: 2382
- English Regnal year: 10 Hen. 6 – 11 Hen. 6
- Buddhist calendar: 1976
- Burmese calendar: 794
- Byzantine calendar: 6940–6941
- Chinese calendar: 辛亥年 (Metal Pig); 4129 or 3922 — to — 壬子年 (Water Rat); 4130 or 3923
- Coptic calendar: 1148–1149
- Discordian calendar: 2598
- Ethiopian calendar: 1424–1425
- Hebrew calendar: 5192–5193
- Hindu calendars
- Vikram Samvat: 1488–1489
- Shaka Samvat: 1353–1354
- Kali Yuga: 4532–4533
- Holocene calendar: 11432
- Igbo calendar: 432–433
- Iranian calendar: 810–811
- Islamic calendar: 835–836
- Japanese calendar: Eikyō 4 (永享４年)
- Javanese calendar: 1347–1348
- Julian calendar: 1432; MCDXXXII
- Korean calendar: 3765
- Minguo calendar: 480 before ROC 民前480年
- Nanakshahi calendar: −36
- Thai solar calendar: 1974–1975
- Tibetan calendar: ལྕགས་མོ་ཕག་ལོ་ (female Iron-Boar); 1558 or 1177 or 405 — to — ཆུ་ཕོ་བྱི་བ་ལོ་ (male Water-Rat); 1559 or 1178 or 406

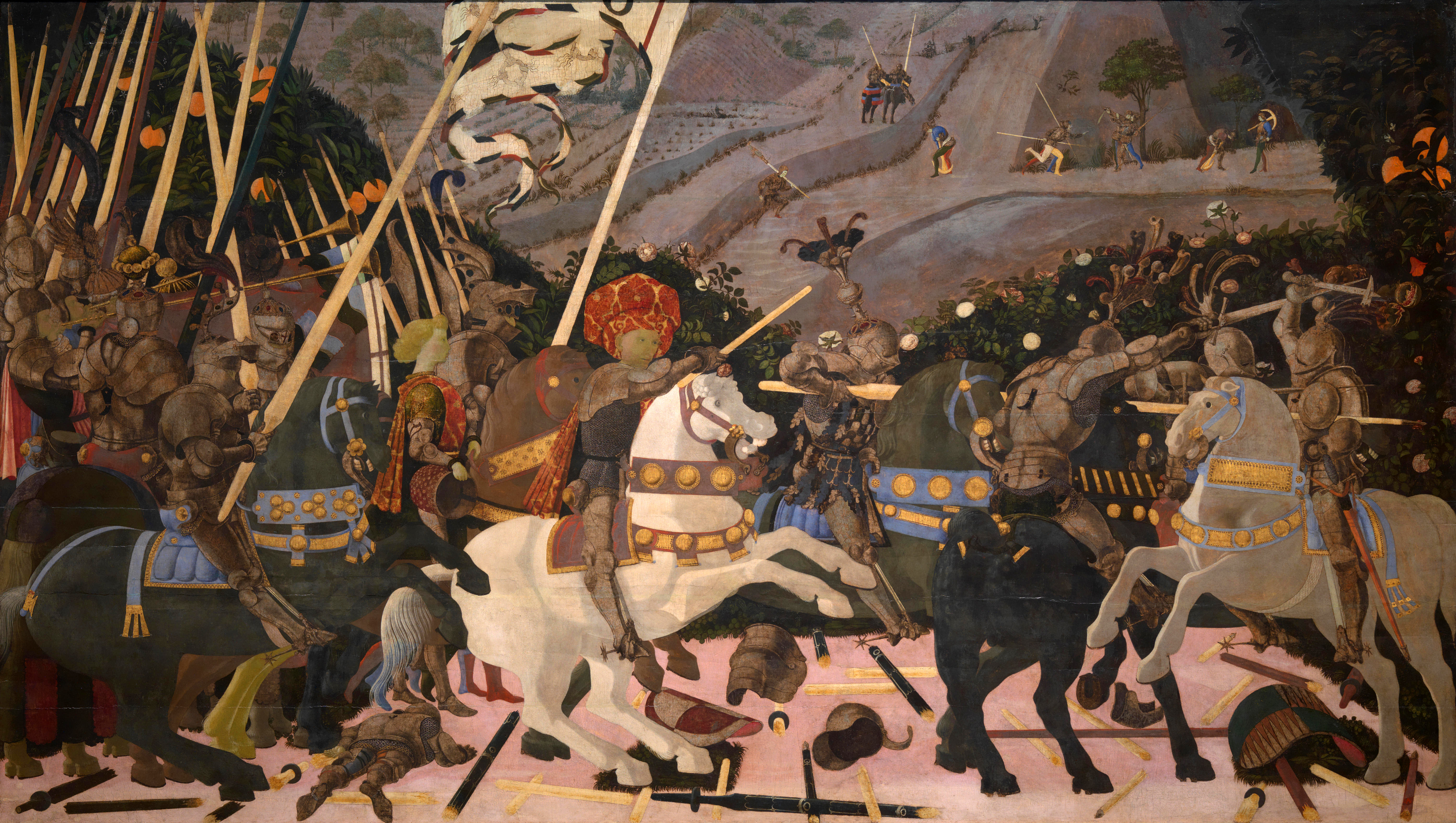
June 1: Republics of Florence and of Siena fight battle of San Romano (painting by Paolo Uccello).

Year 1432 (MCDXXXII) was a leap year starting on Tuesday of the Julian calendar.

== Events ==
=== January–March ===
- January 1 –
  - Yusuf IV is placed on the throne as the new Sultan of Granada, after Muhammad IX is deposed with the support of King Juan II of Castile and Leon. Yusuf dies later in the year and Muhammad IX is restored to the throne a third time
  - Iliaș succeeds his father as Prince of Moldavia.
- January 6 – The siege of Pouancé is undertaken by Duke John V of Brittany, against his nephew John II, Duke of Alençon, as part of a conflict involving the payment of a dowry. The siege lasts until February 22 when Alençon surrenders.
- February 13 – The 42 feet (13 m) tall Statue of Gommateshwara is consecrated by King Veera Pandya in the Indian city of Karkala, capital of the Vijayanagara Empire and now part of the Karnataka state.
- March 5 – The Treaty of Rennes is signed between the Kingdom of France (led by King Charles VII and the Duchy of Brittany (led by the Duke Arthur III.
- March 7 – The seventh Ming Chinese overseas expedition fleet, led by Admiral Zheng He, arrives at the port of Surabaya on the island of Java (now in Indonesia). The Chinese do trading until leaving on July 13
- March 29 – Venetian General Francesco Bussone da Carmagnola is arrested in Venice after reporting to a meeting with the Council of Ten and the Venetian Doge Tommaso Mocenigo. The Doge dies five days later.

=== April–June ===
- April 26 – At Philippopolis in the Ottoman Empire (now Plovdiv in Bulgaria, Mercimek Ahmed completes his translation of the Qabus-nama from the Persian language into Turkish.
- May 5 – With the Tommaso Mocenigo, Doge of Venice, no longer able to protect him, General Francesco Bussone da Carmagnola is beheaded in prison.
- May 6 – Jan van Eyck's Ghent Altarpiece is first presented to the public.
- May 12 – The new English Parliament session is opened at Westminster by the regents for King Henry VI of England, and Sir John Russell is elected by his peers as Speaker of the House of Commons.
- June 1 – In the battle of San Romano, fought in Italy only 30 miles (48 km) from the capital at Florence, the Republic of Florence cavalry and infantry, led by General Niccolò da Tolentino defeat the army of the Republic of Siena, led by Francesco Piccinino. The Renaissance painter Paolo Uccello later commemorates the event in a triptych painting.
- June 29 – At Nicosia John II becomes King of Cyprus upon the death of his father, King Janus.

=== July–September ===
- July 17 – The English Parliament closes its session at Westminster. Royal assent is given in the King's name to the Electors of Knights of the Shire Act 1432 ("Certain things required in him who shall be a chooser of the knights of the parliament"), the Appearance of Plaintiffs Act (setting "the penalty of him that maketh a false entry, that the plaintiff doth offer himself in person, where his doth not") and the Exportation Act ("All wools and woolfells that shall be carried to any other place than to Calais, shall be forfeited to the King and the finder.")
- August 3 – The Ming Chinese expedition arrives at Malacca in what is now Malaysia and stays until September 2.
- August 15 – With 132 ships, the navy of Spain's Crown of Aragon, dispatched by King Alfonso V, lands in North Africa at the island of Djerba off of the coast of Tunisia and begins a siege. The Caliph of Ifriqiya, Abu Faris Abd al-Aziz II, attempts to defend the island. but the Aragonese take control of Djerba by September 9.
- August 31 – Sigismund Kęstutaitis attempts the capture or murder of Švitrigaila, his rival for the throne of the Grand Duchy of Lithuania. Švitrigaila manages to escape.
- September 1 – With the departure of Švitrigaila, Sigismund Kęstutaitis is installed as the new Grand Duke of Lithuania.
- September 9 – The Siege of Djerba ends with the invading armies of Aragon defeating the soldiers of Ifriqiya.
- September 12 – The Ming Chinese expedition reaches the Samudera Pasai Sultanate on Sumatra (now part of Indonesia) and establishes trade agreements with the Sultan Zainal Abidin II, remaining at Pasai until November 2.
- September 30 – A delegation from Poland, led by the Bishop of Kraków, Cardinal Zbigniew Oleśnicki, arrives in Vilnius and brings a message Grand Duke Sigismund that King Władysław II Jagiełło of Poland recognizes Sigismund as Lithuania's ruler, for life.

=== October–December ===
- October 25 – Grand Duke Sigismund of Lithuania signs a document at Grodno (now part of Belarus swearing his loyalty to Poland.
- November 12 – Pope Eugene IV authorizes Cardinal Giuliano Cesarini to close the Council of Basel, but Cesarini declines to do so.
- November 19 – At the Battle of Delebio, Niccolò Piccinino, leader of Milanese Army defeats the Venetian troops of Taddeo d'Este after a two-day battle in which more than 5,300 Venetian cavalry and infantry are killed.
- November 28 – The Ming Chinese expedition lands at the island of Sri Lanka, coming ashore at Beruwala at the Kingdom of Kotte, ruled by Parakramabahu VI, but departs for India four days later.
- December 8 – Lithuanian Civil War (1432–1438): The first battle between the forces of Švitrigaila and Sigismund Kęstutaitis is fought near the town of Oszmiana (Ashmyany), launching the most active phase of the civil war in the Grand Duchy of Lithuania.
- December 10 – The Ming Chinese expedition stops briefly at the Calicut Kingdom (now part of the Kerala state of India) and leaves on December 14 to sail westward across the Indian Ocean toward the island of Hormuz.

=== Date unknown ===
- The Université de Caen is founded.
- The first baccalaureate service is believed to have originated at the University of Oxford.
- Spring – An Albanian revolt, led by Gjergj Arianit Komneni, breaks out against the Ottoman Empire, and spreads through most of Albania.

== Births ==
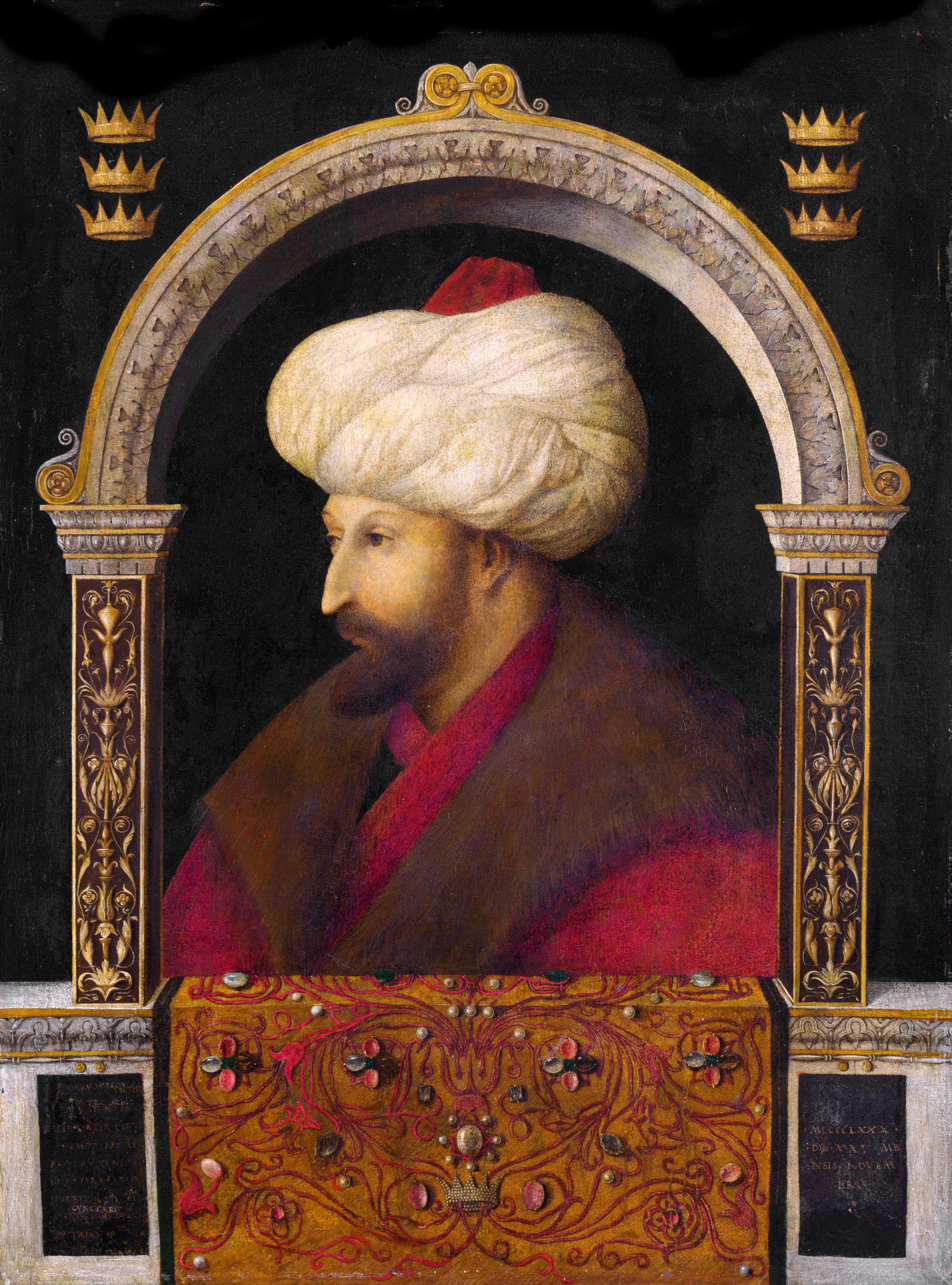
Mehmed II, the Conqueror

- January 15 – King Afonso V of Portugal (d. 1481)
- March 1 – Isabella of Coimbra, Portuguese infanta (d. 1455)
- March 2 – Countess Palatine Margaret of Mosbach, Countess consort of Hanau (d. 1457)
- March 30 – Mehmed II, the Conqueror, Ottoman Sultan (d. 1481)
- April 12 – Anne of Austria, Landgravine of Thuringia, consort of William III, Landgrave of Thuringia (d. 1462)
- August 15 – Luigi Pulci, Italian poet (d. 1484)
- date unknown – Pope Innocent VIII (d. 1492)
- probable – Alvise Cadamosto, Italian explorer (d. 1488)

== Deaths ==
- January 1 – Alexandru cel Bun, Prince of Moldavia
- January 22 – John of Schoonhoven, Flemish theologian (b. 1356)
- May 5 – Francesco Bussone da Carmagnola, Italian adventurer (executed)
- May 19 – Joan of Valois, Duchess of Alençon, French noblewoman (b. 1409)
- June 1 – Dan II, five times Prince of Wallachia (killed in battle against Ottomans)
- June 13 – Uko Fockena, East Frisian chieftain (b. c. 1408)
- June 29 – Janus, King of Cyprus (b. 1375)
- October 19 – John de Mowbray, 2nd Duke of Norfolk, English politician (b. 1392)
- November 14 – Anne of Burgundy, Duchess of Bedford (b. 1404)
- date unknown
  - Gyaltsab Je, throne holder of the Gelug tradition of Buddhism (b. 1364)
  - Art Mac Cathmhaoil, Irish Bishop of Clogher
  - Centurione II Zaccaria, last Prince of Achaea, Baron of Arcadia
