= 1438 =

1438 in various calendars
- Gregorian calendar: 1438; MCDXXXVIII
- Ab urbe condita: 2191
- Armenian calendar: 887; ԹՎ ՊՁԷ
- Assyrian calendar: 6188
- Balinese saka calendar: 1359–1360
- Bengali calendar: 844–845
- Berber calendar: 2388
- English Regnal year: 16 Hen. 6 – 17 Hen. 6
- Buddhist calendar: 1982
- Burmese calendar: 800
- Byzantine calendar: 6946–6947
- Chinese calendar: 丁巳年 (Fire Snake); 4135 or 3928 — to — 戊午年 (Earth Horse); 4136 or 3929
- Coptic calendar: 1154–1155
- Discordian calendar: 2604
- Ethiopian calendar: 1430–1431
- Hebrew calendar: 5198–5199
- Hindu calendars
- Vikram Samvat: 1494–1495
- Shaka Samvat: 1359–1360
- Kali Yuga: 4538–4539
- Holocene calendar: 11438
- Igbo calendar: 438–439
- Iranian calendar: 816–817
- Islamic calendar: 841–842
- Japanese calendar: Eikyō 10 (永享１０年)
- Javanese calendar: 1353–1354
- Julian calendar: 1438; MCDXXXVIII
- Korean calendar: 3771
- Minguo calendar: 474 before ROC 民前474年
- Nanakshahi calendar: −30
- Thai solar calendar: 1980–1981
- Tibetan calendar: མེ་མོ་སྦྲུལ་ལོ་ (female Fire-Snake); 1564 or 1183 or 411 — to — ས་ཕོ་རྟ་ལོ་ (male Earth-Horse); 1565 or 1184 or 412

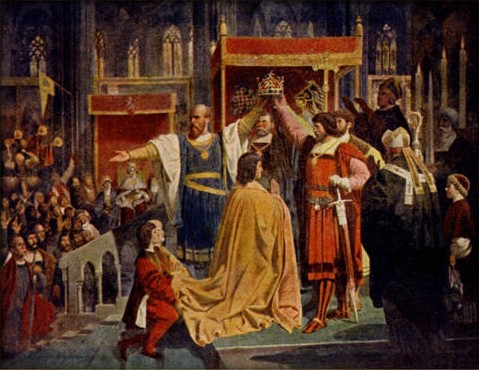
June 29: Albert II is crowned King of Bohemia in Prague (painting by Karel Svoboda).

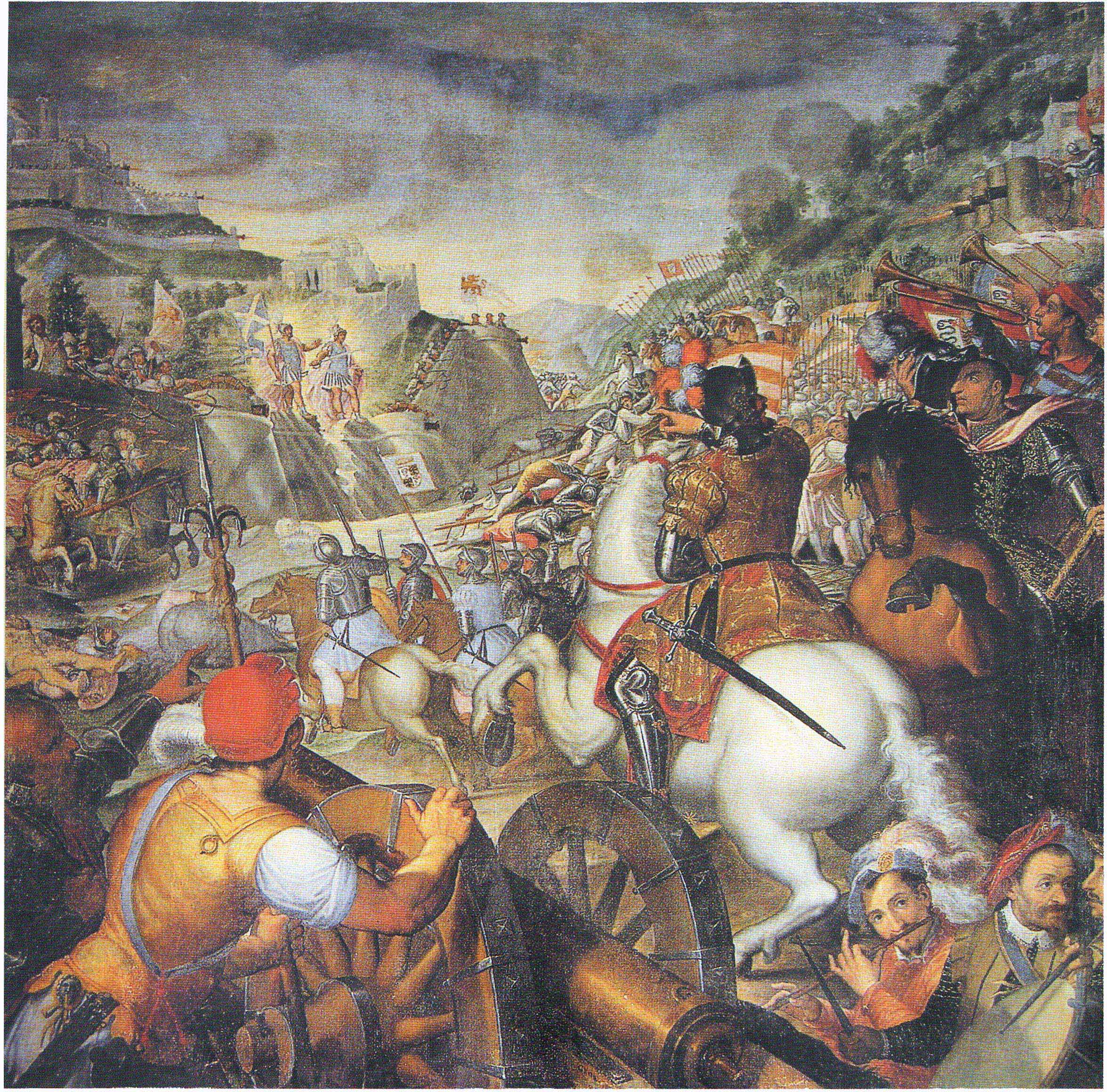
December 13: Siege of Brescia by Milanese troops is ended by the city's patron saints (Appearance of Saints Faustinus and Jovita in the Defense of Brescia, by Grazio Cossali (1607))

Year 1438 (MCDXXXVIII) was a common year starting on Wednesday of the Julian calendar.

== Events ==
=== January–March ===
- January 1 – Albert II of Habsburg is crowned as King of Hungary at Székesfehérvár.
- January 8 – Upset at the attempted reforms at the Council of Basel in Switzerland, Pope Eugene IV convenes a rival council at Ferrara in Italy, through Niccolò Albergati, the Roman Catholic Bishop of Bologna, with 40 prelates in attendance.
- January 9 – The city of Cluj (Kolozsvár) is conquered, thus marking the end of the Transylvanian peasant revolt, which started at Bobâlna.
- January 24 – The Council of Basel, with only 16 bishops present, votes to suspend Pope Eugene from papal authority.
- February 2 – The Unio Trium Nationum pact is established in Transylvania.
- February 10 – All Souls' College is founded in the University of Oxford by Henry Chichele, Archbishop of Canterbury, and Henry VI of England as a graduate institution.
- February 15 – Pope Eugene issues the bull "Exposcit debitum", declaring the council at Ferrara an ecumenical council, and commanding the prelates at Basel to appear at Ferrara within a month or face excommunication.
- March 17 – Albert II of Germany is approved by the electors in the Holy Roman Empire as the King of the Romans, the ruler of Germany.

=== April–June ===
- April 14 – The County of Holland declares war on several cities of the Hanseatic League, triggering the Dutch–Hanseatic War.
- May 6 – Albert becomes King of Bohemia.
- May 19 – René of Anjou, son of the late King Louis II of Valois-Anjou arrives in the Kingdom of Naples to take the vacant throne, reaching the Italian city ahead of King Alfonso V of Aragon, who also wants the throne. Alfonso makes plans to lay siege to the city of Naples.
- June 7 – Upon the death of Al-Ashraf Sayf ad-Dīn Barsbāy, the Mamluk Sultan of Egypt and Syria, his 14 year old son Al-Aziz Jamal al-Din Yusuf temporarily becomes the new monarch, under the guardianship of the regent Sayf al-Din Jaqmaq, Na'ib of Damascus.
- June 29 – The coronation of Albert II of Habsburg as King of Bohemia takes place in Prague.

=== July–September ===
- July 7 – Charles VII of France issues the Pragmatic Sanction of Bourges, giving the French church control over the appointment of bishops, and depriving the Pope of French ecclesiastical revenues.
- August 5 - Rao Bika, the founder and first ruler of the Rathore Princely Kingdom Bikaner is born to Rani Narandeji Sankhla & Rao Jodha of Jodhpur.
- August 20 – The reign of Friedrich I von Helfenstein as Count of Helfenstein (in the modern-day German state of Baden-Württemberg) ends after 66 years. Friedrich and his brothers Conrad and Ulrich had become joint rulers in 1372 on the death of their father, Ulrich XIII, but Ulrich IX and Conrad I had died in 1375 and 1402, respectively. Friedrich's three sons become the joint rulers.
- September 9 – In Cairo, Sayf al-Din Jaqmaq becomes the new Sultan of Egypt and Syria, deposing the young Sultan Al-Aziz Jamal al-Din Yusuf, whom he has arrested and then deported to Alexandria.
- September 13 – Afonso V becomes King of Portugal upon the death of his father King Duarte I.

=== October–December ===
- October 17 – Erik of Pomerania, King of Sweden, Denmark and Norway, loses direct control of Sweden, as Karl Knutsson Bonde is elected Regent of Sweden.
- October 27 – At Mandore (part of the modern-day state of Rajasthan in India), Rao Ranmal, King of Marwar is assassinated after becoming drunk during the festival of Diwali, when one of his wives, Bharmali, ties him up and opens his bedroom door to admit a team of assassins. Ranmal's son, Rao Jodha, becomes the new King.
- November 27 – Following approval by the General Council of Scotland, regents for King James II of Scotland give royal assent to the Inquisitions in Last Reign Act, providing for the continuation of any inquisition by the Roman Catholic Church for heresy that had been started prior to the assassination of King James I.
- December 8 – In Ming dynasty China, the Emperor Yingzong gives the order to his General, Mu Sheng, to go to war against the state of the Dai people (on the border with the Burmese Kingdom of Ava)and their ruler, King Möng Mao.
- December 13 – The siege of Brescia in Italy, started on September 25 by troops of the Duchy of Milan under condottieri Niccolò Piccinino to liberate the city from its control by the Republic of Venice, is raised after the arrival of Scaramuccia da Forlì. According to tradition, two Brescian martyrs from the second century, Saints Faustinus and Jovita, appear on the top of the city walls and repel the cannonballs fired at the city, and the Milanese abandon the siege.

=== Date unknown ===
- According to John Howland Rowe's chronology, Pachacuti becomes ruler of the Kingdom of Cusco and begins its expansion into the Inca Empire (Tahuantinsuyu).
- At 95 years of age, Nang Keo Phimpha becomes queen of Lan Xang for a few months, then being deposed and killed.
- Just two years after the Ming dynasty court of China allowed landowners paying the grain tax to pay their tax in silver instead, the Ming court now decides to close all silver mines and prohibit all private silver mining in Zhejiang and Fujian provinces. This is a concerted effort to halt the increase of silver circulating into the market. The illegal mining of silver is now an offense punishable by death; although it becomes a dangerous affair, the high demand for silver also makes it very lucrative, and so many chose to defy the government and continue to mine.
- The Sukhothai Kingdom merges with the Ayutthaya Kingdom.

== Births ==
- February 5
  - Margaret of Bourbon, French noble (d. 1483)
  - Philip II, Duke of Savoy (d. 1497)
- February 12 – Adolf, Duke of Guelders and Count of Zutphen (1465–1471) (d. 1477)
- March 23 – Ludovico II of Saluzzo, Italian noble (d. 1504)
- April 3 – John III of Egmont, Dutch noble (d. 1516)
- September 7 – Louis II, Landgrave of Lower Hesse (1458–1471) (d. 1471)
- December 1 – Peter II, Duke of Bourbon, son of Charles I (d. 1503)
- date unknown – Husayn Bayqarah, Timurid ruler of Herat (d. 1506)
- probable – Edmund Beaufort, 4th Duke of Somerset, English nobleman and military commander during the Wars of the Roses (d. 1471)

== Deaths ==
- April 24 – Humphrey FitzAlan, 15th Earl of Arundel (b. 1429)
- September 9 – Edward, King of Portugal (b. 1391)
- October 16 – Anne of Gloucester, English noblewoman (b. 1383)
- October 20 – Jacopo della Quercia, Sienese sculptor (b. c. 1374)
