= 1430 =

1430 in various calendars
- Gregorian calendar: 1430; MCDXXX
- Ab urbe condita: 2183
- Armenian calendar: 879; ԹՎ ՊՀԹ
- Assyrian calendar: 6180
- Balinese saka calendar: 1351–1352
- Bengali calendar: 836–837
- Berber calendar: 2380
- English Regnal year: 8 Hen. 6 – 9 Hen. 6
- Buddhist calendar: 1974
- Burmese calendar: 792
- Byzantine calendar: 6938–6939
- Chinese calendar: 己酉年 (Earth Rooster); 4127 or 3920 — to — 庚戌年 (Metal Dog); 4128 or 3921
- Coptic calendar: 1146–1147
- Discordian calendar: 2596
- Ethiopian calendar: 1422–1423
- Hebrew calendar: 5190–5191
- Hindu calendars
- Vikram Samvat: 1486–1487
- Shaka Samvat: 1351–1352
- Kali Yuga: 4530–4531
- Holocene calendar: 11430
- Igbo calendar: 430–431
- Iranian calendar: 808–809
- Islamic calendar: 833–834
- Japanese calendar: Eikyō 2 (永享２年)
- Javanese calendar: 1345–1346
- Julian calendar: 1430; MCDXXX
- Korean calendar: 3763
- Minguo calendar: 482 before ROC 民前482年
- Nanakshahi calendar: −38
- Thai solar calendar: 1972–1973
- Tibetan calendar: ས་མོ་བྱ་ལོ་ (female Earth-Bird); 1556 or 1175 or 403 — to — ལྕགས་ཕོ་ཁྱི་ལོ་ (male Iron-Dog); 1557 or 1176 or 404

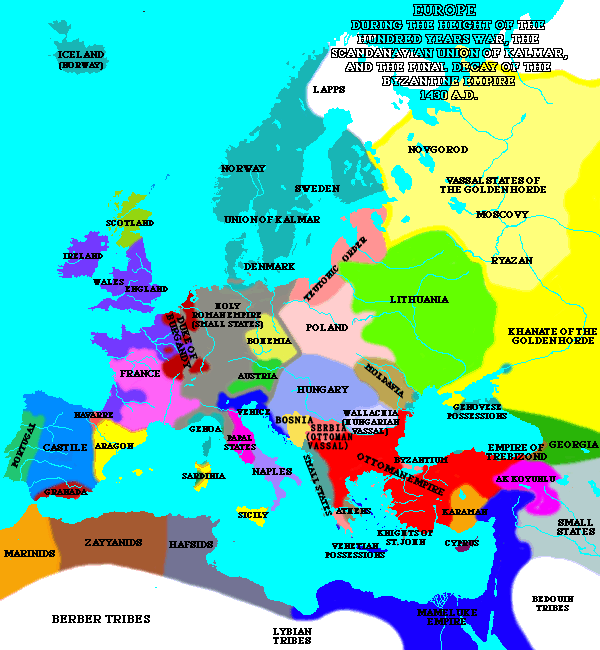
Europe in 1430

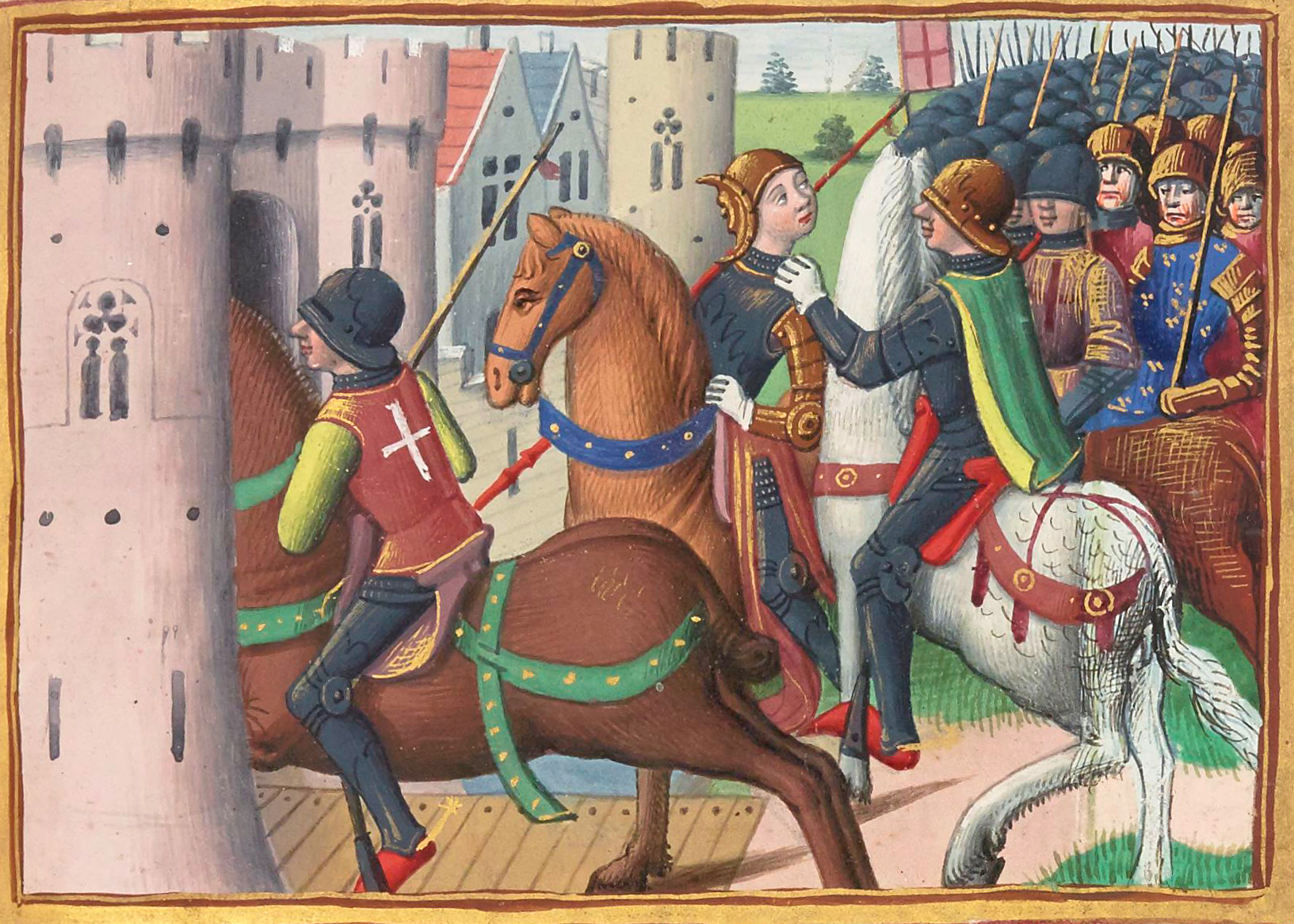
May 23: Joan of Arc captured as prisoner of war.

1430 (MCDXXX) was a common year starting on Sunday of the Julian calendar.

== Events ==
=== January–March ===
- January 7 – Philip the Good, Duke of Burgundy, marries Isabella of Portugal.
- January 10 – Philip the Good founds the Order of the Golden Fleece.
- February 6 – The Hussite General Andreas Prokop signs a treaty with Frederick I, Elector of Brandenburg at Kulmbach, agreeing to withdraw Hussite troops entirely from Germany.
- February 23 – King Henry VI of England gives royal assent to numerous bills passed by the English Parliament, including the Treason Act 1429 (which makes sending an extortion letter a felony, and the burning of a house as retaliation for nonpayment of money an act of treason. Additionally, assent is given to the Forcible Entry Act 1429, the Electors of Knights of the Shires Act 1429, and the Weights and Measures Act 1429.
- March 29 – The Ottoman Empire, led by the Sultan Murad II, captures Thessalonica in Greece after an eight-year siege.

=== April–June ===
- April 28 – The Hussites defeat Hungarian and Serbian troops in the Battle of Nagyszombat in an invasion of the Kingdom of Hungary near Nagyszombat (now Trnava in Slovakia).
- May 14 – The French first attempt to relieve the Siege of Compiègne.
- May 23 – Joan of Arc is captured by the Burgundian troops, led by John II, Count of Ligny, while leading an army to relieve Compiègne. After her surrender to Lyonnel de Wandomme, she is turned over to Philip the Good, Duke of Burgundy, and incarcerated at the castle of Beaulieu-les-Fontaines.
- June 14 – William Waynflete becomes vicar of Skendleby, Lincolnshire.

=== July–September ===
- July 3 – In the Bavarian town of Lindau, 15 Jewish residents are burned at the stake after being accused of murdering a Christian child.
- July 11 – Battle of Trnava: The Hussites defeat the Hungarian-Moravian-Serbian army.
- August 23 – Pope Martin V, writing in the papal brief Ad statum, grants recognition to the Order of Friars Minor Conventual, allowing them the right to hold property.
- September 4 – the Republic of Venice signs a treaty with the Ottoman Empire to end the eight-year war between the two nations after the Ottoman capture of Thessalonica, replacing the previous agreement of 1419.

=== October–December ===
- October 27 – Vytautas, the Grand Duke of Lithuania, dies shortly after the cancellation of plans to crown him as King of Lithuania. His cousin Švitrigaila is elected unanimously by the Lithuanian nobles as the new Grand Duke, violating an agreement with the Kingdom of Poland that the Polish nobles would be able to participate in the election.
- November 16 – (1st waxing of Natdaw 792 ME) In Burma, Min Saw Mon, King of Arakan, moves the capital from Launggyet to the nearby, but more strategically located, city of Mrauk-U.
- November 21 – Joan of Arc is sold by the Burgundians to the Kingdom of England for 10,000 livre tournois, equivalent to 808.8 kg (28,530 oz or 1,783.1 lbs) of silver.
- November 27 – King Henry VI summons members of Parliament to assemble on January 12.
- December 23 – Seven months after her capture at Compiegne, Joan of Arc is moved from the castle of Le Crotoy to the tower at the Rouen Castle.

=== Date unknown ===
- With the surrender of Chalandritsa and the citadel of Patras to the Byzantine Despotate of the Morea, the Principality of Achaea comes to an end.
- Bratislava Castle is converted to a fortress under Sigismund of Luxembourg.

== Births ==
- March 10 – Oliviero Carafa, Italian Catholic cardinal (d. 1511)
- March 23 – Margaret of Anjou, queen of Henry VI of England (d. 1482)
- June 13 – Beatrice, Duchess of Viseu, Portuguese infante (d. 1506)
- June 27 – Henry Holland, 3rd Duke of Exeter, Lancastrian leader during the English Wars of the Roses (d. 1475)
- October 16 – King James II of Scotland (d. 1460) and his twin Alexander Stewart, Duke of Rothesay (d. 1430)
- October 28 – Richard West, 7th Baron De La Warr, English soldier, son of Reginald West (d. 1475)
- November 11 – Jošt of Rožmberk, Bishop of Breslau, Grand Prior of the Order of St. John (d. 1467)
- date unknown
  - Hosokawa Katsumoto, Japanese warlord
  - Barbara von Ottenheim, German alleged witch and sculpture model (d. 1484)
  - Isabel Bras Williamson, Scottish merchant (d. 1493)
  - Joana de Castre, Catalan noble (d. 1480)
- probable – Heinrich Kramer, German churchman and inquisitor (d. 1505)
- approximate – Clara Hätzlerin, German scribe (d. 1476)

== Deaths ==
- January 5 – Philippa of England, queen consort of Denmark, Norway and Sweden (b. 1394)
- January 29 or 1427 – Andrei Rublev, Russian iconographer (possible date; b. 1360)
- April 18 – John III, Count of Nassau-Siegen, German count
- August 4 – Philip I, Duke of Brabant (b. 1404)
- August 18 – Thomas de Ros, 8th Baron de Ros, English soldier and politician (b. 1406)
- October 27 – Vytautas, Grand Prince of Lithuania (b. 1352)
- date unknown
  - Thomas FitzAlan, English noble
  - Christine de Pizan, Italian proto-feminist writer (b. 1364)
