= 1480 =

1480 in various calendars
- Gregorian calendar: 1480; MCDLXXX
- Ab urbe condita: 2233
- Armenian calendar: 929; ԹՎ ՋԻԹ
- Assyrian calendar: 6230
- Balinese saka calendar: 1401–1402
- Bengali calendar: 886–887
- Berber calendar: 2430
- English Regnal year: 19 Edw. 4 – 20 Edw. 4
- Buddhist calendar: 2024
- Burmese calendar: 842
- Byzantine calendar: 6988–6989
- Chinese calendar: 己亥年 (Earth Pig); 4177 or 3970 — to — 庚子年 (Metal Rat); 4178 or 3971
- Coptic calendar: 1196–1197
- Discordian calendar: 2646
- Ethiopian calendar: 1472–1473
- Hebrew calendar: 5240–5241
- Hindu calendars
- Vikram Samvat: 1536–1537
- Shaka Samvat: 1401–1402
- Kali Yuga: 4580–4581
- Holocene calendar: 11480
- Igbo calendar: 480–481
- Iranian calendar: 858–859
- Islamic calendar: 884–885
- Japanese calendar: Bunmei 12 (文明１２年)
- Javanese calendar: 1396–1397
- Julian calendar: 1480; MCDLXXX
- Korean calendar: 3813
- Minguo calendar: 432 before ROC 民前432年
- Nanakshahi calendar: 12
- Thai solar calendar: 2022–2023
- Tibetan calendar: ས་མོ་ཕག་ལོ་ (female Earth-Boar); 1606 or 1225 or 453 — to — ལྕགས་ཕོ་བྱི་བ་ལོ་ (male Iron-Rat); 1607 or 1226 or 454

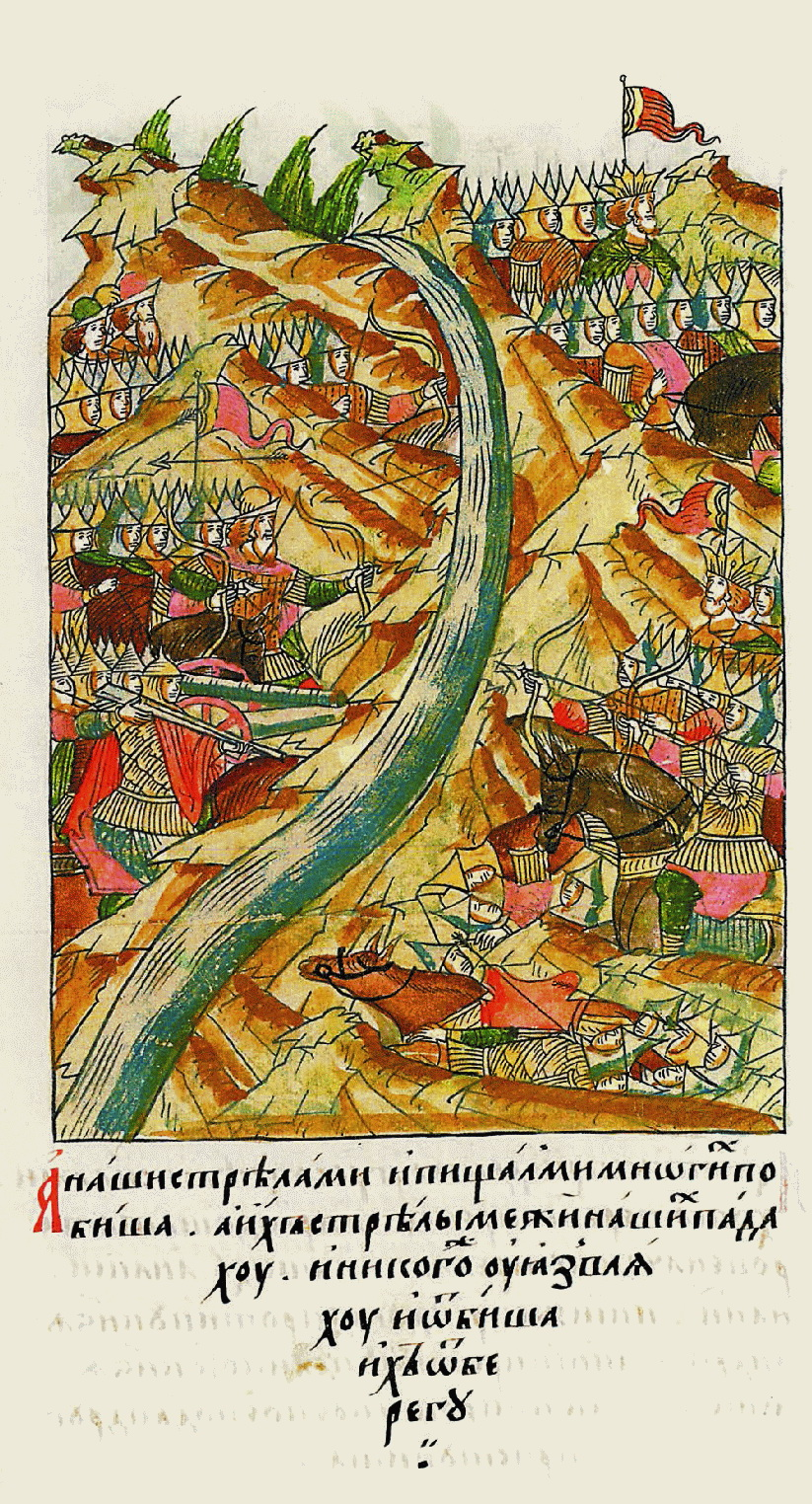
November 8: Russian troops of the Grand Duchy of Moscow force the retreat of the Mongol invaders at the Ugra river.

Year 1480 (MCDLXXX) was a leap year starting on Saturday of the Julian calendar.

== Events ==
=== January–March ===
- January 3 – King Louis XI buys the succession rights to the Duchy of Brittany from the Countess Nicole de Châtillon for 50,000 livres
- February 4 – Pedro de Vera is appointed as the colonial Governor of Gran Canaria by the Spanish monarchs Ferdinand and Isabella, and directed to carry out the conquest of the Canary Islands and to end the fighting between the conquistadors who had taken the island in 1478.
- March 3 – The Treaty of Lucerne is signed between the Duchy of Milan and the Old Swiss Confederation, 15 months after the Battle of Giornico. Milan cedes the Leventina District to the Canton of Uri.
- March 6 – The Treaty of Toledo is signed as Ferdinand and Isabella of Spain recognize the African conquests of Afonso V of Portugal, and he cedes the Canary Islands to Spain.
- March 17 – Lorenzo the Magnificent, Lord of the Republic of Florence, and King Ferrante of Naples agree to an alliance between the two Italian nations, and to end the ongoing war that had started in 1479. Lorenzo had traveled to Naples in December to reach a treaty to end the war.

=== April–June ===
- April 6 – King Afonso V of Portugal orders his navy to "capture anyone trading illegally in Africa, and to throw the goods and ship's crew into the sea.
- May 3 – Pedro del Algaba, the Spanish colonial Governor of the Canary Islands, is arrested by Juan Rejón, and is executed on Rejón's orders on May 20.
- May 23 – The Siege of Rhodes begins as the Ottoman Turk invading force begins its invasion, introducing the psychological warfare of coming ashore with "loud martial music" and the shrieking cries of dervishes.
- June 20 – The Senate of the Republic of Venice votes to approve the transfer of ownership of the island of Santorini (now the Greek island of Thera) to Domenico Pisani. The island was the dowry given to Pisani for the marriage of Fiorenza Crispo, by Firenzo's father, Giacomo III Crispo, Duke of the Archipelago, a set of 18 of the 20 inhabited Cyclades islands in the Aegean Sea.

=== July–September ===
- July 28
  - Mehmed II fails in his attempt to capture Rhodes from the Knights of Rhodes.
  - An Ottoman army lands near Otranto in southern Italy. Pope Sixtus IV calls for a crusade to drive the Ottomans away. Otranto falls on August 12 after a 15-day siege.
- August 14 – Two days after Ottoman troops had broken a siege and taken control of the village of Otranto in southern Italy, led by Gedik Ahmed Pasha, carry out the massacre of 813 inhabitants who had refused to convert from Christianity to Islam.
- September 27 – The co-rulers of most of Spain, Ferdinand II of Aragon and Isabella I of Castile initiate the Spanish Inquisition to look for heretics and unconverted Jews, appointing the Dominican Order clerics Miguel de Morillo and Juan de San Martín to serve as the first two inquisitors.

=== October–December ===
- October 8 – The Great Stand on the Ugra River begins as troops of the Grand Duchy of Moscow, led by the Grand Duke Ivan III and General Ivan Molodoy battle against the invading Mongol armies of the Golden Horde, led by their ruling monarch, Akhmat Khan. The invasion began after Ivan III stopped paying tribute to the Horde. The Theotokos of Vladimir icon is credited with saving Moscow. The standoff between the troops lasts five weeks before Akhmat and the Mongol troops retreat.
- November 3 – Ludovico Sforza succeeds his sister-in-law, Bona of Savoy, as regent of Milan for his 12-year-old nephew Gian Galeazzo Sforza, Bona's son and the Duke of Milan.
- November 8 – After reinforcements from Lithuania fail to arrive for more than four weeks, Akhmat Khan orders the Mongols to end their attempt to conquer the Grand Duchy of Moscow.
- December 7 – During the war between Dai Viet and Lan Xang (now the northern part of Vietnam and the entire nation of Laos), Emperor Xianxong of Ming dynasty China is informed by his envoys that Dai Viet had subdued Lan Xang and was preparing to invade Lan Na (now part of northern Thailand. China responds by sending intelligence agents to spy on Dai Viet.

=== Date unknown ===
- The Lighthouse of Alexandria's final remains disappear when Qaitbay, Sultan of Egypt, builds the Citadel of Qaitbay on its site.
- Magdalen College School, Oxford, is established by William Waynflete.

== Births ==
- January 10 – Margaret of Austria, Regent of the Netherlands (d. 1530)
- February 12 – Frederick II of Legnica, Duke of Legnica from 1488 (until 1495 and 1505 with his brothers) (d. 1547)
- February 13 – Girolamo Aleandro, Italian Catholic cardinal (d. 1542)
- April 10 – Duke Philibert II of Savoy (d. 1504)
- April 18 – Lucrezia Borgia, Duchess of Ferrara (d. 1519)
- June 1 – Tiedemann Giese, Catholic bishop from Danzig (Gdańsk) in Poland (d. 1550)
- July 5 – Philip of the Palatinate, Bishop of Freising and Naumburg (d. 1541)
- November 10 – Bridget of York, English nun (d. 1517)
- October – Saint Cajetan, founder of the Theatines (d. 1547)
- date unknown
  - Vannoccio Biringuccio, Italian metallurgist (d. 1539)
  - Claude Garamond, French publisher (d. 1561)
  - Giovanni Guidiccioni, Italian poet (d. 1541)
  - Ferdinand Magellan, Portuguese explorer (d. 1521)
  - Jerzy Radziwiłł, Polish nobleman (d. 1541)
  - Gazi Husrev-beg, Ottoman statesmen (d. 1541)
  - Palma il Vecchio, Italian painter (d. 1528)
- probable
  - Arasibo, Taino Cacique
  - Hans Baldung, German painter (d. 1545)
  - Matteo Bandello, Italian novelist (d. 1562)
  - Johann Georg Faust, German alchemist (d. 1540)
  - Anna Taskomakare, Swedish merchant craftswoman and estate owner (d. after 1528)
  - Jumacao, Taino Cacique
  - Conn O'Neill, 1st Earl of Tyrone (d. 1559)
  - Marcantonio Raimondi, Italian engraver (d. c. 1534)
  - Elizabeth Boleyn, Countess of Wiltshire (d. 1538)

== Deaths ==
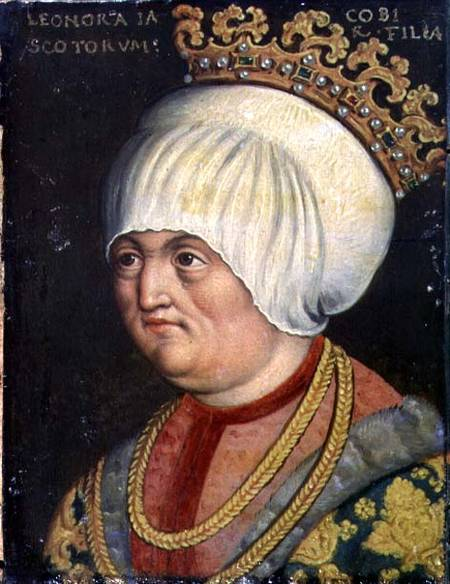
Eleanor of Scotland died 20 November

- January 5 – Jakobus, nobleman from Lichtenberg in the northern part of Alsace (b. 1416)
- April 14 – Thomas de Spens, Scottish statesman and prelate (b. c. 1415)
- May 10 – Philipp I, Count of Hanau-Lichtenberg (1458–1480) (b. 1417)
- May 19 – Jan Długosz, Polish historian (b. 1415)
- May 25 – William III, Count of Henneberg-Schleusingen (b. 1434)
- June 6 – Vecchietta, Italian painter, sculptor and architect (b. c. 1410)
- July 6 – Antonio Squarcialupi, Italian composer (b. 1416)
- July 10 – René of Anjou, king of Naples (b. 1409)
- July 15 – John III, Count of Nassau-Weilburg, German nobleman (b. 1441)
- July 26 – Ruprecht of the Palatinate, Archbishop and Prince Elector of Cologne (b. 1427)
- September 1 – Ulrich V, Count of Württemberg (b. 1413)
- October 4 – Jakub of Sienno, medieval Bishop Kraków in the years 1461–1463 (b. 1413)
- October 18 – Uhwudong, Korean dancer (b. 1440)
- November 20 – Eleanor of Scotland, Scottish princess (b. 1433)
- November 29 – Frederick I, Count Palatine of Simmern (b. 1417)
- December 14 – Niccolò Perotti, Italian humanist scholar (b. 1429)
- date unknown
  - Nicolas Jenson, French engraver (b. 1420)
  - Tristão Vaz Teixeira, Portuguese explorer (b. c. 1395)
  - Antonio Vivarini, Italian painter (b. c. 1440)
  - Joana de Castre, Catalan noble (b. 1430)
