= Anna Taskomakare =

Anna Taskomakare (circa 1480 – died after 1528), was a Swedish merchant craftswoman and estate owner. She belonged to the most successful burghers in Stockholm in the 1520s. The name 'Anna Taskomakare' means "Anna the Bagmaker". She belongs to the very first women merchants in Sweden of whom there are any significant amount of information.

The name of Anna's parents are unknown, but she was the sister of Simon Skräddare ("Simon the Tailor") and with him the heir of their parents, and born into the wealthy Stockholm burgher class: it is noted that her brother sold a stone house which had previously belonged to their parents in 1513.

On an unknown date, Anna married a burgher craftsman of bags, who is named as "Bag Maker" but whose first name cannot be clearly established. It is clearly stated that both Anna's husband and brother were executed in the Stockholm Bloodbath of 1520.

As a widow, Anna became more visible in the official documents. As was not uncommon, she is stated to have been active in the profession of her spouse before his death, though it was first as a widow when she is formally recognized as a bag maker, taking over the workshop and permission to manufacture and sell bags and purses from her late spouse. Aside from this, she also shared the inheritance from her wealthy brother with his widow Margit Priwalk, which gave her the capital to a parallel career as an estate owner. She bought, renovated and enlarged houses in Stockholm and rented them out. Further, she traded in iron from Arboga and copper from Kopparberg. She is described as successful and wealthy.

In 1528, the king confiscated one of her shipments of copper and iron. As compensation, he gave her a stone house which had belonged to the religious organisation of Saint Catherine's Guild prior to the Swedish Reformation. This is the last documentation where she is mentioned, and the year of her death is unknown.
