= Henry VI =

Henry VI may refer to:

- Henry VI, Holy Roman Emperor (1165–1197), also king of Germany, Italy, Burgundy and Sicily
- Henry VI, Count Palatine of the Rhine (ruled 1212–1214)
- Henry VI, Count of Luxembourg (crowned 1281, died 1288)
- Henry VI the Elder (before 1345 – 1393), Polish duke
- Henry VI, Count of Gorizia (1376–1454)
- Henry VI of England (1421–1471)
  - Henry VI (play), a series of three plays by William Shakespeare
- Henry VI, Burgrave of Plauen (1536–1572)
- Heinrich VI Reuss of Plauen and Köstritz (1707–1783)
- Pretenders to the throne of France:
  - Henri, Count of Paris (1908–1999), Orleanist claimant
  - Infante Jaime, Duke of Segovia (1908–1975). Legitimist claimant
