= Speaker of the House of Commons =

Speaker of the House of Commons is a political leadership position found in countries that have a House of Commons, where the membership of the body elects a speaker to lead its proceedings.

Systems that have such a position include:

- Speaker of the House of Commons (United Kingdom), which has historically comprised:
  - Speaker of the House of Commons of England (until 1706)
  - Speaker of the House of Commons of Great Britain (1707–1800)
  - Speaker of the House of Commons of the United Kingdom (since 1801)
- Speaker of the House of Commons (Canada) (since 1867)
- Speaker of the House of Commons of Northern Ireland (1921–1972)
- Speaker of the Irish House of Commons (until 1800)
