= List of acts of the Parliament of Scotland from 1438 =

This is a list of acts of the Parliament of Scotland for the year 1438.

It lists acts of Parliament of the old Parliament of Scotland, that was merged with the old Parliament of England to form the Parliament of Great Britain, by the Union with England Act 1707 (c. 7).

For other years, see list of acts of the Parliament of Scotland. For the period after 1707, see list of acts of the Parliament of Great Britain.

== 1438 ==
=== November ===
Continuing the 1st parliament of James II, a general council held in Edinburgh from 27 November 1438.

Short title, or popular name	Citation	Royal assent
Long title
Inquisitions in Last Reign Act 1438 (repealed)	November 1438 c. 1 (Note: This is the citation in the Record Edition.) — (Note: This act is not listed in the Duodecimal Edition.)	27 November 1438
Ordinacio super inquisicionibus captis tempore domini regis Jacobi primi. (Orig. penes Dominium Gray de Foulis.); Ordinance upon the inquisitions taken in the time of Lord King James the First. (Orig. belonging to the Dominion of Gray de Foulis.) (Repealed by Statute Law Revision (Scotland) Act 1906 (6 Edw. 7. c. 38))
Robbery Act 1438 (repealed)	November 1438 c. 2 —	24 December 1438
Of oppin reyffis and spoliacionis. Of open robbery and spoilation. (Repealed by Statute Law Revision (Scotland) Act 1906 (6 Edw. 7. c. 38))

=== March ===
The 2nd parliament of James II, a general council held in Stirling from 13 March 1439.

Short title, or popular name	Citation	Royal assent
Long title
Sittings of Parliament Act 1438 (repealed)	March 1438 c. 1 (Note: This is the citation in the Record Edition.) — (Note: This act is not listed in the Duodecimal Edition.)	13 March 1439
Of the halding of twa sessionis yerly. Of the holding of two sessions yearly. (Repealed by Statute Law Revision (Scotland) Act 1906 (6 Edw. 7. c. 38))
Rebels Act 1438 (repealed)	March 1438 c. 2; 1438 c. 3 (Note: This is the citation in the Duodecimal Edition.)	13 March 1439
Of arresting and taking soverte of rebellis or unrewlful men resett or haldyn within castellis or fortalicis. Of arresting and taking surety of rebels or unruly men harbouring or holding within castles or fortresses. (Repealed by Statute Law Revision (Scotland) Act 1906 (6 Edw. 7. c. 38))

=== Sources ===
- Alexander, William (1841). "Acta Parliamentorum Regis Jacobi Secundi". An Abridgement of the Acts of the Parliaments of Scotland. Edinburgh: Adam and Charles Black. p. 440 – via Google Books.
- Alexander, William (1841). "Acta Parliamentorum Regis Jacobi Secundi". An Abridgement of the Acts of the Parliaments of Scotland. Edinburgh: Adam and Charles Black. p. 440 – via Google Books.
- Chronological Table of the Statutes. London: Her Majesty's Stationery Office. 1972. p. 1317 – via Google Books.
- "Index of Statutes: James II (1437-1460)". Records of the Parliaments of Scotland to 1707. University of St Andrews.

== See also ==
- List of legislation in the United Kingdom
- Records of the Parliaments of Scotland
