= Al-Aziz Jamal al-Din Yusuf =

Sultan of Egypt and Syria (r. 7 June 1438 – 9 September 1438)

Sultan of Egypt and Syria
- Reign: 7 June 1438 – 9 September 1438
- Predecessor: Barsbay
- Successor: Sayf al-Din Jaqmaq
- Born: 14 April 1424
- Died: after 1438
- Father: Barsbay
- Mother: Khawand Jolban

Al-Aziz Jamal al-Din Yusuf (Arabic: العزيز جمال الدين أبو المحاسن يوسف بن برسباي) was the son of Barsbay, and a Mamluk sultan of Egypt from 7 June to 9 September 1438.

== Biography ==
Following Sultan Barsbay's death in 1438, his fifteen-year-old son Yusuf inherited the throne. However, Jaqmaq who was his guardian orchestrated a scheme to remove him from power and seized the sultanate for himself. Yusuf who reigned for 94 days was imprisoned in Cairo then in Alexandria, where, according to Ibn Taghribirdi, he spent the rest of his life studying under quite pleasant circumstances.

== Sources ==
- Clot, André (2009). L'Égypte des Mamelouks 1250-1517. L'empire des esclaves (in French). Paris: Perrin. ISBN 978-2-262-03045-2.
- Ibn Taghribirdi (1929). Al-Nujūm al-Zāhirah fī Mulūk Miṣr wa-al-Qāhirah (in Arabic). Vol. 15. Egyptian Dar al-Kutub Press in Cairo.

Regnal titles
Preceded by Barsbay	Mamluk Sultan of Egypt; 7 June 1438 – 9 September 1438	Succeeded by Sayf al-Din Jaqmaq
