= John of Schoonhoven =

John of Schoonhoven (Dutch Jan van Schoonhoven) (1356/7, Schoonhoven – January 22, 1432, Groenendaal) was a Flemish theologian and writer.

After a philosophical education at the University of Paris he entered the convent of the regular canons at Groenendaal near Brussels (circa 1377), where he met John of Ruysbroeck. In 1386 he became prior and master to the novices. After the accession Groenendaal to the Windesheimer congregation he wrote many sermons, some of which became the most well-known writings at the general chapter. Beside these and other sermons, spiritual writings and letters, he wrote the then celebrated Epistola responsalis super epistolam cancellarii.

Schoonhoven was one of the responsible for defending Ruysbroeck against critics, especially Jean Gerson. His works, all written in Latin, reflect the influence of Ruysbroeck. However, his works focus more on practical ascese. He represents an important link in the evolution of spirituality from Ruysbroeck and Geert Groote until Desiderius Erasmus.

== Bibliography ==
- A. Ampe, `Les rédactions successives de l'apologie Schoonhovienne pour Ruusbroec contre Gerson', in Revue d'Histoire Ecclésiastique, 55 (1960).
- A. Combes, `Essai sur la critique de Ruysbroeck par Gerson', in Epistola responsalis, dl. 1 (1945–1959).
- A. Gruijs, `Jean de Schoonhoven (1356–1432). Sa vie et son oeuvre', in Bulletin Du Cange (Arch. lat. medii aevi), 32 (1962) en 33 (1963).
- A. Gruijs, `Jean de Schoonhoven', in Dictionnaire de spiritualité, dl. 8 (1974).
- E. Persoons & A. Gruijs, `Ioannis Theodirici de Schoonhovia', in Petri Trudonensis catalogus scriptorum windeshemensium (1968).
