= Isabel Bras Williamson =

Scottish merchant (c. 1430–1493)

- Born: Isabel Bras c. 1430
- Died: c. 1493
- Occupation: Merchant
- Spouse: Thomas Williamson

Isabel Bras Williamson (c. 1430–c. 1493), was a Scottish merchant, who was known as one of the most prominent female merchants in late medieval Scotland.

== Life ==
Isabel Bras was born around 1430 and was probably the daughter of Simon Bras (fl. 1467) of Edinburgh. She married the prominent Edinburgh merchant Thomas Williamson. With her help, her husband began trading with Flanders. After his death she took responsibility for the business, particularly trading with Flanders. Between 1464 and 1473, she was widowed. Instead of allowing her son John, who was being trained in the family business at the time, to take over her late husband's businesses, she ran them herself, including trading with Flanders. However, from the 1480s, she started to work in partnership with her son, and he became a member of the Edinburgh Merchant Guild in 1487.

Williamson became very well regarded in mercantile circles and specialised in importing fine goods from Europe, and exporting wool in exchange. She was so well known that her son John was referred to as "Isabel Williamson's son" in the royal treasurer's accounts in 1474. She also acquired burgess status, which was very unusual for a woman at that time. From the 1470s, she became an active supplier of luxury cloths and textiles to the royal household, to the King and Queen, and their servants. She provided French brown cloth and "tartane" for a cradle in the royal nursery. Her son John later continued supplying the royal household from the 1490s.

She later acquired land at Mortonhall and founded a chaplaincy in 1489 at the altar of St. Lawrence in St. Giles, Edinburgh. Williamson died probably died in or after October 1493 and was probably buried beneath the altar at St. Giles.

== Name ==
She usually called herself "Isabel Williamson" although married women in medieval Scotland rarely used their husband's surnames, possibly to emphasise her connection to the merchant family. When she endowed the chaplaincy, she used the name "Isabel Bras", memorialising her parentage.
