= Mercimek Ahmed =

Mercimek Ahmed (Ottoman Turkish: Merjümek Ahmed ibn Ilyas; died after 1432) was an Ottoman author who flourished in the first third of the 15th century. He is principally known for translating the Persian Qabus-nama, written by the Ziyarid ruler Keikavus in 1082, into Old Ottoman. Mercimek's translation, which he completed in 1432, was simple, based on the spoken Turkish vernacular, and featured a predominantly Turkish lexicon, but it was written at a time when the Persianisation of Ottoman literature was underway. By the beginning of the 18th century, Mercimek's translation had come to be viewed as archaic and unsophisticated. As a result of 20th-century Turkish nationalist waves, which augmented the interest in the Turkic aspects of the Turkish language, his translation gained renewed appreciation.

== Life ==
In his translation, Mercimek mentions his own name three times. However, he is not attested in the pre-modern biographical and historical Ottoman literary works. In his translation, only very little information can be found regarding his life. He flourished in the first third of the 15th century and appears to have been a servant or courtier of Ottoman Sultan Murad II (r. 1421–1444). He was well educated in both traditional religious and secular studies by the standards of his time. He is viewed as a person of moderate habits; in his writings, he states that he never indulged in the "calamitous" practice of drinking wine in the morning. The work contains no information on how he obtained his unusual name, Marjumak in Persian, meaning "lentil". He died after 1432.

== Qabus-nama translation and legacy ==
Keikavus' Qabus-nama, originally written in 1082 and belonging to the mirror for princes genre, held a prominent place in Ottoman akhlakh literature of the 14th and 15th centuries. During this period, at least five prose translations of the Persian original were produced, of which Mercimek's is the latest and best-preserved. Mercimek completed his Old Ottoman translation on 26 April 1432 and wrote that while he was in Sultan Murad's company at Philippopolis (modern-day Plovdiv, Bulgaria), he saw that Murad was reading the Qabus-nama in its Persian original. According to Mercimek's writings, when Murad complained that the existing Turkish translation was of poor quality, he promptly began writing a new one. In Mercimek's words: "complete, without omitting a word; to the best of my ability explaining the more difficult words in it by extended comment so that the readers might enjoy its [full] meaning". It was copied after publication and circulated widely. Mercimek's translation has no independent title. Its manuscripts are labeled by headings such as Qabus-nama-yi Türkī or Terjeme-yi Qabus-nama.

Mercimek's writing skills are considered to be of much higher quality than those of his predecessors. Unlike his predecessors, Mercimek's writings attest to a writer who was neither imitatively literal nor prone to offhand omission. Numerous explanatory comments accompany his translation, as he chose to paraphrase when meticulousness might have obscured his purpose. Mercimek, on occasion, further animated his translation by spontaneously inserting suitable Turkish proverbs, or even verses of his own composition, in addition to his trademark habit of rendering Kaykavus' illustrative verses of the Persian original into his own Turkish verse.

Mercimek's translation contrasts with other literary works of his time. At the time, literary Turkish, as the Ottomanist and Turkologist Eleazar Birnbaum calls it, was "at a crossroads". Some writers were creating a complex and pompous high insha style of literary Turkish, packed with Persian literary artifices, with little Turkish lexical material in favour of Arabic and Persian loanwords. Mercimek's translation differed, as his literary style was quite simple and relied on the spoken Turkish vernacular, with a lexicon that was mainly Turkish. Although some writers continued to choose simple Turkish for writing during the following centuries, the bulk of Ottoman literature would become increasingly ornate and Persianised. By the beginning of the 18th century, Mercimek's style and vocabulary had come to be viewed as obsolete and unsophisticated, with the renowned stylist and historian Nazmizade Murtaza of Baghdad commissioned to revise Mercimek's Qabus-nama translation to align it with contemporaneous literary taste.

As a result of 20th-century Turkish nationalist waves, which augmented the interest in the Turkic aspects of the Turkish language, his translation gained renewed appreciation.

== Copies ==
Mercimek's translation can be found in several important manuscript collections, including:

- Ankara Milli Kütüphane nr. H. 941
- Topkapı Sarayı Müzesi Kütüphanesi, Hazine, nr. 1153
- Nuruosmaniye Kütüphane, nr. 4096
- BL, Turkish MSS, Or. 1181

== Sources ==
- Birnbaum, Eleazar (1991). "Merd̲j̲ümek". In Bosworth, C. E.; van Donzel, E. & Pellat, Ch. (eds.). The Encyclopaedia of Islam, Second Edition. Volume VI: Mahk–Mid. Leiden: E. J. Brill. ISBN 978-90-04-08112-3.
- Sobers-Khan, Nur (2014). "Fİrāsetle Naẓar Edesİn: Recreating the Gaze of the Ottoman Slave Owner at the Confluence of Textual Genres". In Faroqhi, Suraiya; İnalcık, Halil; Ergene, Boğaç (eds.). Well-Connected Domains: Towards an Entangled Ottoman History. Brill. ISBN 978-9004274686.
- Yazıcı, Tahsin; Özgüdenlı, Osman G. (2000). "PERSIAN AUTHORS OF ASIA MINOR PART 2". In Yarshater, Ehsan (ed.). Encyclopædia Iranica (Online ed.). Encyclopædia Iranica Foundation.
