= Siege of Djerba (1432) =

1432 siege in Djerba

- Part of Aragonese expedition to Tunisia of 1432
Date	15 August – 9 September 1432
Location	Djerba, Hafsid dynasty
Result	Aragonese victory

Belligerents
Crown of Aragon	Hafsid dynasty

Commanders and leaders
Alfonso V of Aragon	Abu Faris Abd al-Aziz II

Strength
132 ships	Unknown

Casualties and losses
Low	Unknown

The siege of Djerba in 1432 was one of the battles of the Aragonese expedition to Tunisia of 1432.

== Background ==
The permanent ambition of Alfonso V of Aragon was always the Kingdom of Naples, which he had already tried to conquer in the war of 1420–1423. He thought that having a base in Tunisia would be useful for a future invasion of Italy, so he sent an expedition.

== Siege ==
In 1432, taking advantage of the truce with Castile during the War of the Infants of Aragon, Alfonso V of Aragon went to sea again towards Italy, with a first stop on the island of Djerba, laying siege on August 15, until September 9. Abu Faris Abd al-Aziz II, the ruler of Tunis, faced him on the beach, but was defeated.

== Consequences ==
Alfonso V's opportunity came in 1434 and 1435 with the successive deaths of Louis III and Queen Joana II. Alfonso was in Sicily waging war against the Hafsids, and he decided to conquer his precious kingdom, starting by attacking Gaeta. But the Aragonese fleet was defeated at the Battle of Ponza in 1435 by a joint fleet formed by Genoa, the Duchy of Milan, the Papacy and the Kingdom of Naples. In this defeat, many nobles, the king himself and his brothers were taken prisoner and were not released until the payment of a very high ransom provided by the Courts of Montsó. Shortly after, the Duke of Milan changed sides by allying himself with Alfonso, which allowed him to try to conquer the kingdom again in 1436, until the Aragonese captured Naples on June 2, 1442, and annexing the Kingdom of Naples.

== See also ==
- Aragonese expedition to Tunisia of 1424
