= Joana de Castre =

Joana de Castre (1430-1480), was a Catalan noble.

She was born to the noble Pere de Castre and Blanca de So, and married viscount Jofre de Rocabertí, Lord of Peralad, and had four sons and a daughter. She managed the fief of Rocabertí on several occasions during the absence of her spouse. In 1461, her spouse participated in the liberation of Charles, Prince of Viana, from the captivity of his father John II of Aragon and Navarre. When Charles' death resulted in the Catalan Civil War, her brothers sided with the rebels, while Joanna and her spouse sided with John II. During the royal expedition to Girona, Joanna acted as a mediator between the king and her brother Guillem Ramon. When her spouse was taken captive in 1464, she was forced to assume responsibility for his fief until his release in 1472.
