= 1541 =

1541 in various calendars
- Gregorian calendar: 1541; MDXLI
- Ab urbe condita: 2294
- Armenian calendar: 990; ԹՎ ՋՂ
- Assyrian calendar: 6291
- Balinese saka calendar: 1462–1463
- Bengali calendar: 947–948
- Berber calendar: 2491
- English Regnal year: 32 Hen. 8 – 33 Hen. 8
- Buddhist calendar: 2085
- Burmese calendar: 903
- Byzantine calendar: 7049–7050
- Chinese calendar: 庚子年 (Metal Rat); 4238 or 4031 — to — 辛丑年 (Metal Ox); 4239 or 4032
- Coptic calendar: 1257–1258
- Discordian calendar: 2707
- Ethiopian calendar: 1533–1534
- Hebrew calendar: 5301–5302
- Hindu calendars
- Vikram Samvat: 1597–1598
- Shaka Samvat: 1462–1463
- Kali Yuga: 4641–4642
- Holocene calendar: 11541
- Igbo calendar: 541–542
- Iranian calendar: 919–920
- Islamic calendar: 947–948
- Japanese calendar: Tenbun 10 (天文１０年)
- Javanese calendar: 1459–1460
- Julian calendar: 1541; MDXLI
- Korean calendar: 3874
- Minguo calendar: 371 before ROC 民前371年
- Nanakshahi calendar: 73
- Thai solar calendar: 2083–2084
- Tibetan calendar: ལྕགས་ཕོ་བྱི་བ་ལོ་ (male Iron-Rat); 1667 or 1286 or 514 — to — ལྕགས་མོ་གླང་ལོ་ (female Iron-Ox); 1668 or 1287 or 515

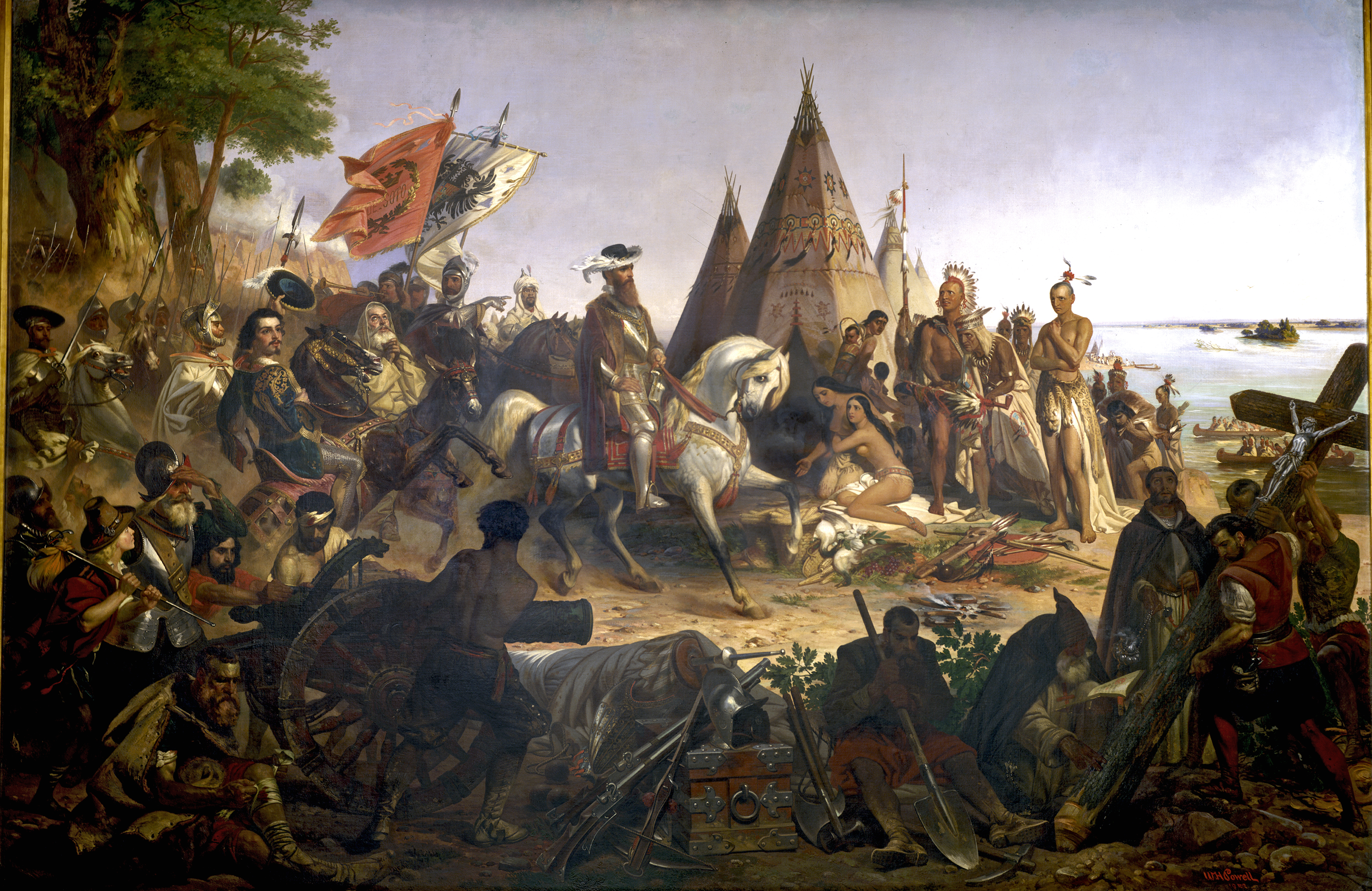
May 8: Spanish explorer Hernando de Soto reaches the Mississippi River.

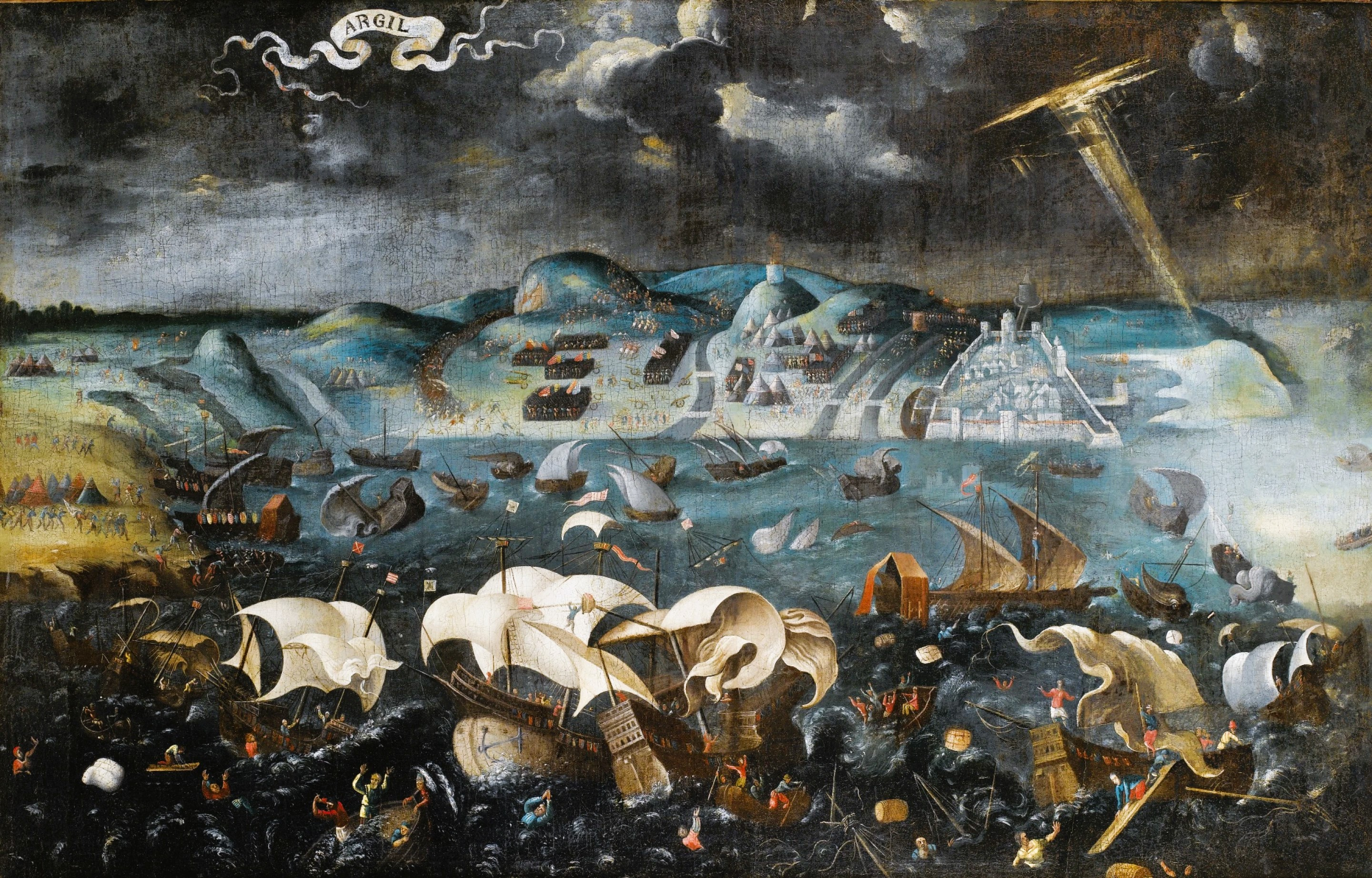
October 24: Heavy storms disperse a Spanish, German and Italian invading force and save the Emirate of Algiers

Year 1541 (MDXLI) was a common year starting on Saturday of the Julian calendar.

== Events ==
=== January–March ===
- January 4 – Leonardo Cattaneo della Volta is elected to a two-year term as the new Doge of the Republic of Genoa, succeeding Giannandrea Giustiniani Longo
- February 8 – (13th day of 1st month of Tenbun 10) In Japan, the Siege of Yoshida-Kōriyama Castle, started by Amago Haruhisa of the 30,000 strong Amago clan the previous September in an attack against the Mōri clan led by Mōri Motonari and the Ōuchi clan, ends with a defeat of the attackers. The Amago clan sustains heavy losses, including the death of Amago Hisayuki.
- February 12 – Pedro de Valdivia founds Santiago del Nuevo Extremo, which will become the capital of Chile.
- February 19 – Petru Rareș becomes the Prince of Moldavia for a second time, overthrowing the Voivode Alexandru Cornea at Suceava (now in Romania) at the direction of the Ottoman Sultan Suleiman.
- March 8 – At the Battle of Suakin, fought at an Ottoman port city on the Red Sea in what is now Sudan, Portuguese General Estêvão da Gama and his brother Cristóvão da Gama lead an attack against the Ottoman ruler and plunder the city.
- March 12 – The Portuguese Empire's fortress at Agadir falls to the Moroccan general Mohammed al-Shaykh after a siege of 24 days.
- March 28 – In what is now the capital of Ecuador, San Francisco de Quito is declared a city by the decree of King Charles I of Spain and the Viceroyalty of Peru.

=== April–June ===
- April 7 – Francis Xavier leaves Lisbon, on a mission to the Portuguese East Indies.
- April 24 – Battle of Sahart: Gelawdewos is defeated by the forces of Imam Ahmad ibn Ibrahim al-Ghazi.
- May 8 – Spanish explorer Hernando de Soto reaches the Mississippi River, naming it the Rio de Espiritu Santo ("River of the Holy Spirit").
- May 23 – Jacques Cartier departs from Saint-Malo, France on his third voyage.
- June 13 – The Parliament of Ireland is opened by King Henry VIII for a session that will last for two years.
- June 16 – Şehzade Mustafa, the son of the Ottoman Sultan Suleiman the Magnificent, is appointed as the new Ottoman Governor of the Amasya region of Turkey.
- June 26 – At Lima, Francisco Pizarro, the Spanish conqueror of the Inca Empire of Peru and Governor of Nueva Castilla since 1529, is assassinated by 20 heavily-armed supporters of Diego de Almagro II in retaliation for the 1538 execution of Diego de Almagro.

=== July–September ===
- July 7 – (Tenbun 10, 14th day of the 6th month) Takeda Shingen becomes head of Japan's powerful Takeda clan of samurais that rules the Kai Province, overthrowing and banishing his father, Takeda Nobutora. Nobutora is exiled to Suruga Province for the next 32 years.
- July 9 – Estêvão da Gama departs Massawa, leaving behind 400 matchlock men and 150 slaves under his brother Cristóvão da Gama, with orders to assist the Emperor of Ethiopia to defeat Ahmad ibn Ibrahim al-Ghazi, who had invaded his Empire.
- August 21 – The Janissaries of Suleiman the Magnificent besiege Buda, wounding Wilhelm von Roggendorf, who dies from his wounds on the way to Komárno a few days later.
- September 9–11 – Spanish noblewoman Beatriz de la Cueva serves as governor of the colony of Guatemala, before she is killed in a mudslide from Volcán de Agua, which ruins the capital city, Ciudad Vieja.
- September 13 – After three years of exile, John Calvin returns to Geneva to reform the church under a body of doctrine that comes to be known as Calvinism.
- September 28 – King Charles of Spain begins the disastrous campaign against the Regency of Algiers as he assembles a fleet of 500 ships, with 24,000 soldiers, at the Spanish island of Majorca and prepares to cross the Mediterranean with the fleets of allied nations led by the Admiral Andrea Doria of the Republic of Genoa.

=== October–December ===
- October 7 – Through royal decree, the city of Arequipa is granted its coat of arms.
- October 24 – Algiers Expedition: One day after thousands of Spanish, German and Italian soldiers arrived on the North African coast and proceeded to surround the city of Algiers, heavy storms begin and the Algerian defenders surround King Charles and the other commanders. Fifteen European ships are wrecked onshore, and 33 others sink. Over the next 30 days, the Europeans are forced to retreat.
- November 1 – King Henry VIII of England is first informed of that the Queen consort, Catherine Howard, has been having an affair with Thomas Culpeper.
- November 19 – (1st waxing of Tazaungmon 903 ME) King Tabinshwehti of Burma, having concluded the Buddhist Lent, leads the attack on the Kingdom of Prome with 17,000 troops and 1,400 boats.
- November 23 –
  - Catherine Howard, the Queen consort of England, is arrested after 16 days of questioning by Thomas Cranmer, the Archbishop of Canterbury, reveals that she had also been conducting an adulterous affair with Francis Dereham while married to King Henry VIII. She is imprisoned at Syon Abbey in Middlesex near London.
  - Charles V, Holy Roman Emperor, who also serves as King Carlos I of Spain, is finally able to depart from Algiers and abandons his army.
- December 3 – The Holy Roman Emperor Charles V is finally able to return to Spain, arriving at Cartagena
- December 10 – Thomas Culpeper and Francis Dereham are both executed at Tyburn after being convicted of treason in committing adultery with Queen Catherine. Culpeper is beheaded, while Dereham is hanged, drawn and quartered. As a warning to the public, the severed heads of both men are placed on spikes on the London Bridge.

=== Date unknown ===
- Ottoman Sultan Suleiman the Magnificent seals off The Golden Gate in Jerusalem, likely because of a prophecy that the Messiah would return through this gate to Jerusalem.
- Iceland adopts the Lutheran faith.
- Gerardus Mercator makes his first globe.
- The first official translation of the entire Bible into Swedish is made, and is called the Gustav Vasa Bible.
- John Calvin translates his Institutio Christianae religionis into French, as L'Institution chrétienne.
- Elia Levita's chivalric romance, the Bovo-Bukh, is first printed, the earliest published secular work in Yiddish.

== Births ==
- January 24 – Magdalena Moons, Dutch woman associated with the 1574 Siege of Leiden (d. 1613)
- January 26 – Florent Chrestien, French writer (d. 1596)
- February 21 – Philipp V, Count of Hanau-Lichtenberg (d. 1599)
- March 25 – Francesco I de' Medici, Grand Duke of Tuscany (d. 1587)
- April 8 – Michele Mercati, Italian physician and gardener (d. 1593)
- April 12 – Ipatii Potii, Metropolitan of Kiev (d. 1613)
- September 7
  - Luigi Groto, Italian lutenist and poet (d. 1588)
  - Hernando de Cabezón, Spanish musician (d. 1602)
- September 5 – Roberto de' Nobili, Italian Catholic cardinal (d. 1559
- September 21 – Anna of Nassau-Dillenburg, Countess consort of Nassau-Weilburg (d. 1616)
- November 9 – Menso Alting, Dutch preacher and reformer (d. 1612)
- November 25 – Michele Bonelli, Italian Catholic cardinal (d. 1598)
- February 12 – Johann Bauhin, Swiss botanist (d. 1613)
- date unknown
  - Pierre Charron, French philosopher (d. 1603)
  - El Greco, or Domênikos Theotokópoulos (Greek: Δομήνικος Θεοτοκόπουλος), Cretian painter, sculptor and architect (d. 1614)
  - Hatano Hideharu, Japanese samurai (d. 1579)
  - Mizuno Tadashige, Japanese nobleman (d. 1600)
  - Guðbrandur Þorláksson, Icelandic mathematician (d. 1627)
  - Hattori Hanzō, Japanese ninja who served under Tokugawa Ieyasu (d. 1596)

== Deaths ==
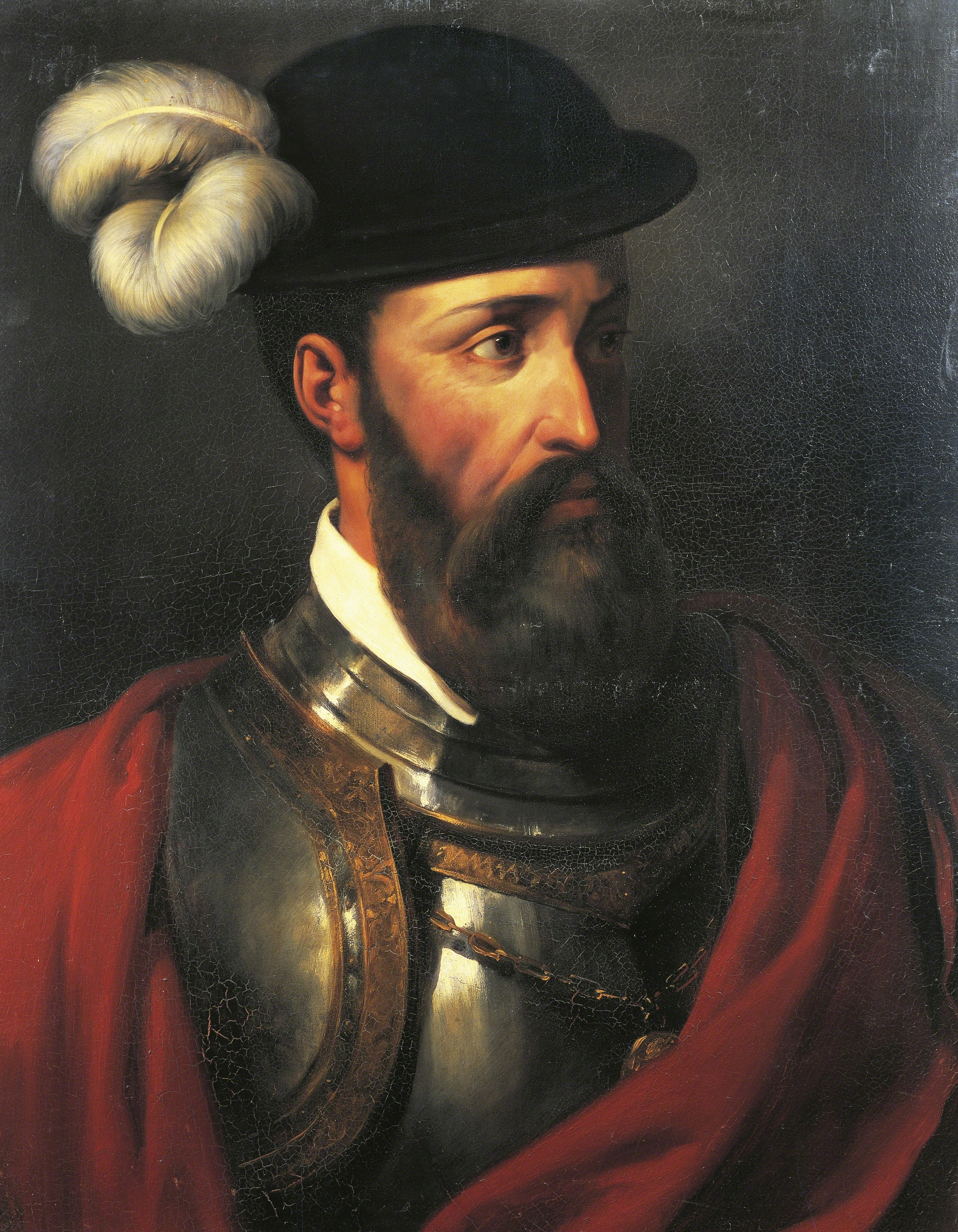
Francisco Pizarro

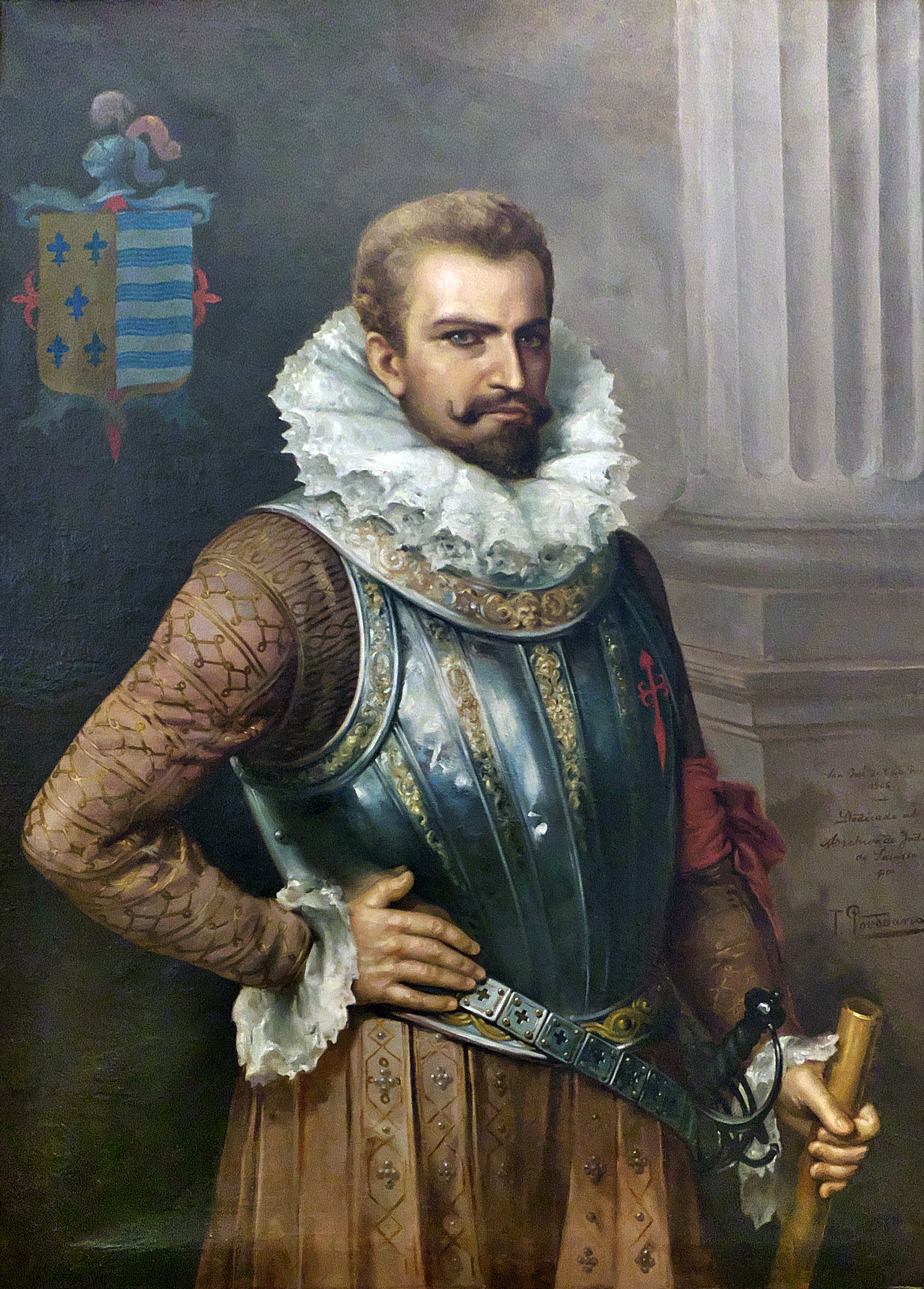
Pedro de Alvarado

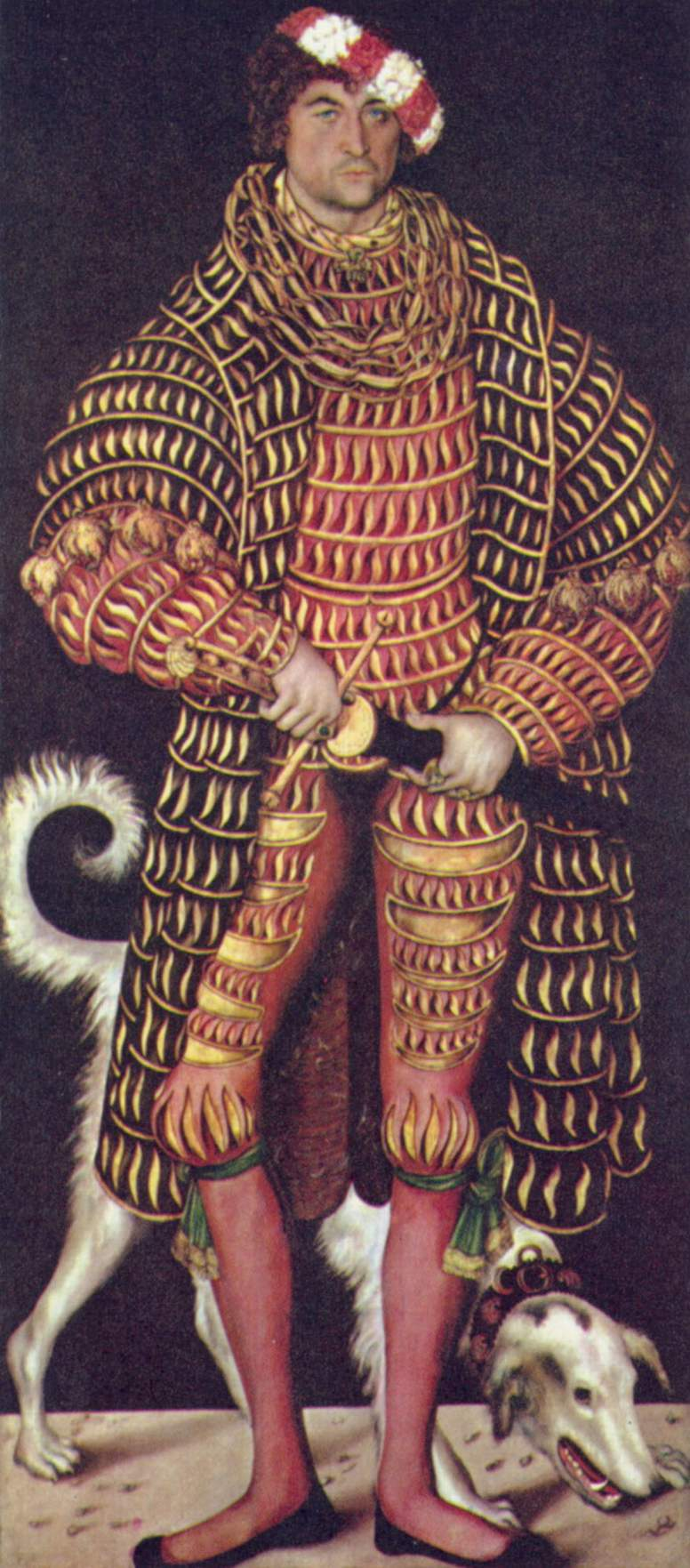
Henry IV, Duke of Saxony

- January 2 – Wang Gen, Chinese philosopher (b. 1483)
- January 5 – Philip of the Palatinate, Bishop of Freising and Naumburg (b. 1480)
- April – Jerzy Radziwiłł, Polish nobleman (b. 1480)
- April 21 – James, Duke of Rothesay, Scottish prince (b. 1540)
- April 24 – Celio Calcagnini, Italian astronomer (b. 1479)
- April 29 – Johann Gramann, German theologian (b. 1487)
- May 27 – Margaret Pole, 8th Countess of Salisbury (executed) (b. 1473)
- June 26 – Francisco Pizarro, Spanish conquistador (b. c. 1475)
- July 4 – Pedro de Alvarado, Spanish conquistador (b. 1495)
- August – Juan de Valdés, Spanish religious writer (b. 1500)
- August 1 – Simon Grynaeus, German scholar and theologian (b. 1493)
- August 18 – Henry IV, Duke of Saxony (1539–1541) (b. 1473)
- August 19 – Vincenzo Cappello, Venetian admiral and statesman (b. 1469)
- September 24 – Paracelsus, Swiss alchemist and physician (b. 1493)
- September – Beatriz de la Cueva, Governor of Guatemala (b. 1510)
- October 18 – Margaret Tudor, queen of James IV of Scotland (b. 1489)
- November 4 – Wolfgang Fabricius Capito, German reformer (b. 1478)
- November 30 – Amago Tsunehisa, Japanese warlord (b. 1458)
- December 10
  - Thomas Culpeper, English courtier, lover of Catherine Howard (b. c. 1514)
  - Francis Dereham, English lover of Catherine Howard (executed)
- December 24 – Andreas Karlstadt, Christian theologian and reformer (b. 1486)
- date unknown
  - Jean Clouet, French miniature painter (b. 1480)
  - Margareta von Melen, Swedish noblewoman (b. 1489)
  - Gül Baba, Ottoman dervish poet
  - Giovanni Guidiccioni, Italian poet (b. 1480)
  - Gazi Husrev-beg, Ottoman statesmen (b. 1480)
