= Bible translations into Swedish =

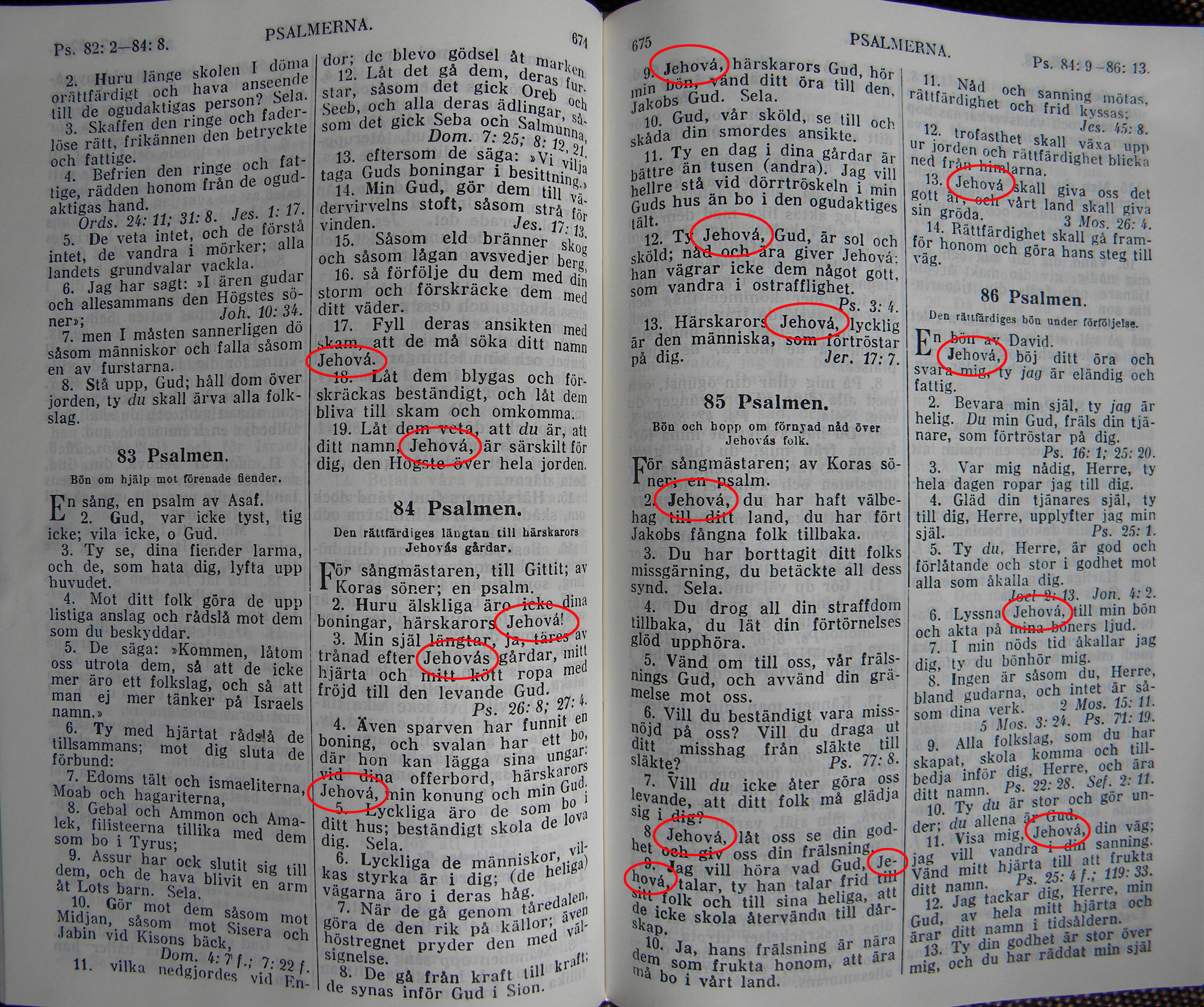
Helge Åkeson's translation of Psalms 83-85

There are remarkably few Bible translations into Swedish that have been made before the last two centuries. The Latin common Bible is known to have been used by the Catholic Church during the Christian part of the middle ages, but at least paraphrases in Swedish of some parts of the Bible were made at the time. However, no complete translation has been preserved, and the earliest, certainly complete Bible was not made until the Reformation, on commission by Gustav Vasa.

== Translations before the Reformation ==
Despite the fact that there exists archeological evidence of a Christian cult in Varnhem, Västergötland, in the 9th century, and that at least some parts of Sweden became organized by the Catholic Church in the early 11th century, there are no sources supporting written translations of any parts of the Bible until the 14th century.

=== Magnus Eriksson's and Saint Birgitta's Bibles ===
The earliest mentions of a Swedish Bible is note in an inventory list for Magnus IV of Sweden, where a "big volume Bible in Swedish" is listed. A similar note is made for Bridget of Sweden.

=== The Pentateuch Paraphrase ===
Pentateuchparafrasen, the Pentateuch Paraphrase, is a famous manuscript from the 1330s. It is a paraphrase on the five books of Moses, and also contains a slightly shortened variant of Acts of the Apostles. It exists today in one complete copy, Codex Holmiensis A 1 (MBIB) from 1526, stored in National Library of Sweden, and one almost complete copy, Codex Thott 4 (MBIA) from 1400–1450, stored in Copenhagen.

It is possible that both the Bibles of Magnus IV and Bridget of Sweden were either the original Pentateuch Paraphrase, or copies of it. According to the sources, it is possible that Bridget had a translation made, that became a paraphrase, and that she later gave it to the king, or the queen.

=== Translations in the late middle ages ===
A few other translations are known from the 15th century:

- The Book of Joshua. Translated by Nicolaus Ragvaldi. Part of Codex Holmiensis A 1.
- The Book of Judges. Translated by Nicolaus Ragvaldi. Part of Codex Holmiensis A 1.
- The Book of Judith. Translated by Jöns Budde. Part of Codex Holmiensis A 1.
- The Book of Esther. Translated by Jöns Budde. Part of Codex Holmiensis A 1.
- The Book of Ruth. Translated by Jöns Budde. Part of Codex Holmiensis A 1.
- 1 Maccabees. Translated by Jöns Budde. Part of Codex Holmiensis A 1.
- 2 Maccabees. Translated by Jöns Budde. Part of Codex Holmiensis A 1.
- The Book of Revelation. Unknown translator. Part of Codex Holmiensis A 1.
- Gospel of Nicodemus. Unknown translator. Part of Codex Holmiensis A 3.

== Translations used by the Church of Sweden ==
The following is a list of Bible translations used by the Church of Sweden.

- Gustav Vasa Bible: A translation commissioned by Gustav Vasa, published in 1526 (New Testament) and 1541 (complete Bible). Published shortly after Martin Luther's translation to German (New Testament 1522, and complete Bible 1534).
- Gustav II Adolf Bible: a revision of the Gustav Vasa Bible with verses, published 1618.
- Charles XII Bible: ordered by Charles XII of Sweden, published in 1703, a slight revision of Gustav Vasa's
- 1917 års bibelöversättning, (1917 Bible translation) much revised but still with a slightly antiquated language
- Bibel 2000: the latest official state church translation, including the Old Testament and Apocrypha

== Other Swedish translations ==
- Bible translations from 1536, limited edition of four books of the Old Testament and the Apocrypha
- Normalupplagan (Normal Version)
- Helge Åkessons översättning, (Helge Akesson's Translation) by the Baptist translator Helge Åkesson, 1911
- Nya Världens Översättning (New World Bible Translation): by the Jehovah's Witnesses, latest revision 2017.
- David Hedegårds översättning (David Hedegard's Translation): New Testament only
- Bo Giertz översättning (Bo Giertz Translation): New Testament only
- Svenska folkbibeln (Swedish People's Bible)
- Levande Bibeln (Living Bible): completed in September 2000, by the International Bible Society
- NuBibeln (Swedish Contemporary Bible; NUB), 2015, by Biblica, Inc.
- Reformationsbibeln (Reformation Bible) – New Testament only
- Darby Bible – New Testament only; by Taylor Exclusive Brethren, principal work done by Eric Carrén

== Comparison ==
Translation	Genesis (1 Mosebok) 1:1–3	John (Johannes) 3:16
Codex Holmiensis A3 – Manuscript from Vadstena Abbey, written 1502. The pages with Genesis were copied by Katharina Gudmundi.	J Första timanom tha all tingh waro skapat, Tha skop gudh himel oc iordh Jordhen hon war än thom oc onyth oc mörker war ower all element, Oc gudz andhe gaffs ower alla elementa, Tha sagdhe gudh wardhe lyws, Oc genstan j samma ordhe wardh lyws,	—
Luther Bible (German) 1535, 1545	Im anfang schuff Gott himel und erden. Und die erde war wüst und leer, und es war finster auff der tieffe, und der Geist Gottes schwebet auff dem wasser. Un Gott sprach. Es werde liecht. Und es ward liecht.	Also hat Gott die Welt geliebt, daß er seinen eingeborenen Sohn gab, auf daß alle, die an ihn glauben, nicht verloren werden, sondern das ewige Leben haben.
Gustav Vasa's Biblia, Edition 1541	J Begynnelsenn skapadhe Gudh himmel och iord. Och iorden war oͤdhe och toom / och moͤrker war på diwpet / och Gudz ande sweffde offuer watnet. Och Gudh sadhe / Warde liws / Och thet wardt liws /	Ty så elskadhe Gudh werldena / at han uthgaff sin eenda Son / på thet / at hwar och en som troor på honom / skal icke foͤrgåås / uthan få ewinnerlighit liff.
Swedish Carl XII:s Biblia 1873 Edition	I begynnelsen skapade Gud Himmel och Jord. Och jorden var öde och tom, och mörker var på djupet, och Guds Ande sväfde öfver vattnet. Och Gud sade: Varde Ljus, och det vardt Ljus.	Ty så älskade Gud verldena, att han utgaf sin enda Son, på det att hvar och en, som tror på honom, skall icke förgås, utan få evinnerligit lif.
Translation of 1917	I begynnelsen skapade Gud himmel och jord. Och jorden var öde och tom, och mörker var över djupet, och Guds Ande svävade över vattnet. Och Gud sade: «Varde ljus»; och det vart ljus.	Ty så älskade Gud världen, att han utgav sin enfödde Son, på det att var och en som tror på honom skall icke förgås, utan hava evigt liv.
Svenska Folkbibeln	I begynnelsen skapade Gud himmel och jord. Jorden var öde och tom, och mörker var över djupet. Och Guds Ande svävade över vattnet. Gud sade: "Varde ljus!" Och det blev ljus.	Ty så älskade Gud världen att han utgav sin enfödde Son, för att den som tror på honom inte skall gå förlorad utan ha evigt liv.
Bibel 2000	I begynnelsen skapade Gud himmel och jord. Jorden var öde och tom, djupet täcktes av mörker och en gudsvind svepte fram över vattnet. Gud sade: ”Ljus, bli till!” Och ljuset blev till.	Så älskade Gud världen att han gav den sin ende son, för att de som tror på honom inte skall gå under utan ha evigt liv.
Levande Bibeln (SVL)	Allt började när Gud skapade himlen och jorden. Först var jorden ett formlöst och tomt kaos, och Guds Ande svävade över de mörka dimmorna. Då sa Gud: Ljus, bli till. Då blev det ljust.	För Gud älskade människorna så mycket att han gav dem sin ende Son, för att de som tror på honom inte ska gå under utan ha evigt liv.
Nya världens översättning	I begynnelsen skapade Gud himlen och jorden. Jorden var öde och tom, och de djupa vattnen täcktes av mörker, och Guds verksamma kraft rörde sig över vattenytan. Och Gud sa: "Det ska bli ljus." Då blev ljuset till.	För Gud älskade världen så mycket att han gav sin enfödde son, för att den som tror på honom inte ska gå under utan få evigt liv.

== See also ==
- Swedish Bible Society
