= Reformation Bible =

Addition of the bible

Reformation Bible (Swedish: Reformationsbibeln) is a linguistically heavily modernized revision of the Swedish Charles XII Bible from 1703. The New Testament was completed in 2003 and was published in a revised second edition in 2016. The translation uses the Textus Receptus (the 1894 edition) as its base text, and it has also been influenced by the translational choices of the King James Bible.

== Textual basis ==
The Reformation Bible uses the Textus Receptus, which has its beginning from the work of Erasmus in the 16th century, who based his work primarily on manuscripts of the Byzantine text-type (with some influences from the Latin Vulgate and the Caesarean text). This is due to the reasoning of the translators of the Reformation Bible that the Textus Receptus has been supernaturally preserved by God. However, this decision has been largely criticized by other Swedish Christians, who see the usage of the Textus Receptus as a major flaw, arguing that translations should be based on the more ancient manuscripts such as the Sinaiticus and Vaticanus behind the Nestle-Åland text.

== See also ==
- King James Onlyism
- Bible Translations into Swedish
