= Charles XII Bible =

Swedish-language Bible translation published in 1703

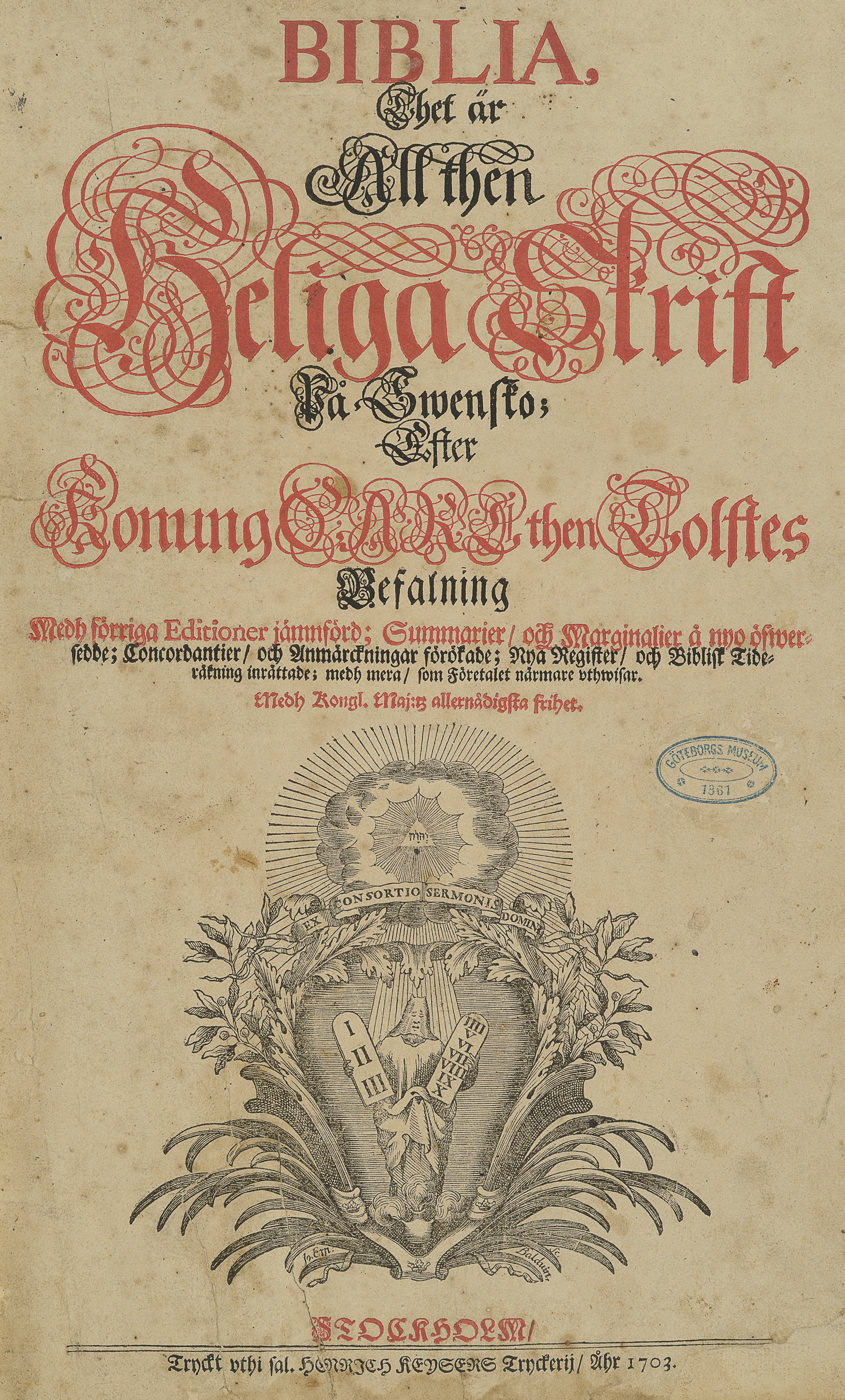
- Title page of Charles XII Bible, printed in Stockholm in 1703.
- Language: Swedish
- Complete Bible published: 1703
- Online as: Charles XII Bible at Wikisource
- Derived from: Gustav II Adolf Bible
- Genesis 1:1–3 I Begynnelsen skapade Gudh Himmel och Jord. 2. Och jorden war öde och toom, och mörker war på diupet, och Gudz Ande swäfde öfwer watnet. 3. Och Gudh sade: Warde Lius, och thet wardt lius. John 3:16 Ty så älskade Gudh verldena, at han uthgaf sin enda Son, på thet at hwar och en som troor på honom, skall icke förgås, utan få ewinnerligit lijf.

The Charles XII Bible (Swedish: Karl XII:s bibel) was a Bible translation into Swedish, commissioned by King Charles XI in 1686 to produce an updated and modernised version of the old translation from 1541, which was known as the Gustav Vasa Bible. Charles XI died before the work was finished, and the new Bible translation was named for his son, King Charles XII. The translation was completed in 1703.

== Modernisation of Gustav II Adolf's Bible ==
Previously, in 1618, during the reign of Gustav II Adolf, a revised version of the Gustav Vasa Bible had been published; the Charles XII Bible is a modernised version of this Bible, including corrections and revised spellings. It remained the official Swedish Bible translation and was used in readings and sermons in the Church of Sweden until 1917, when it was replaced by the 1917 års kyrkobibel.
