= Gustav II Adolf Bible =

Swedish-language 1618 translation of the Bible

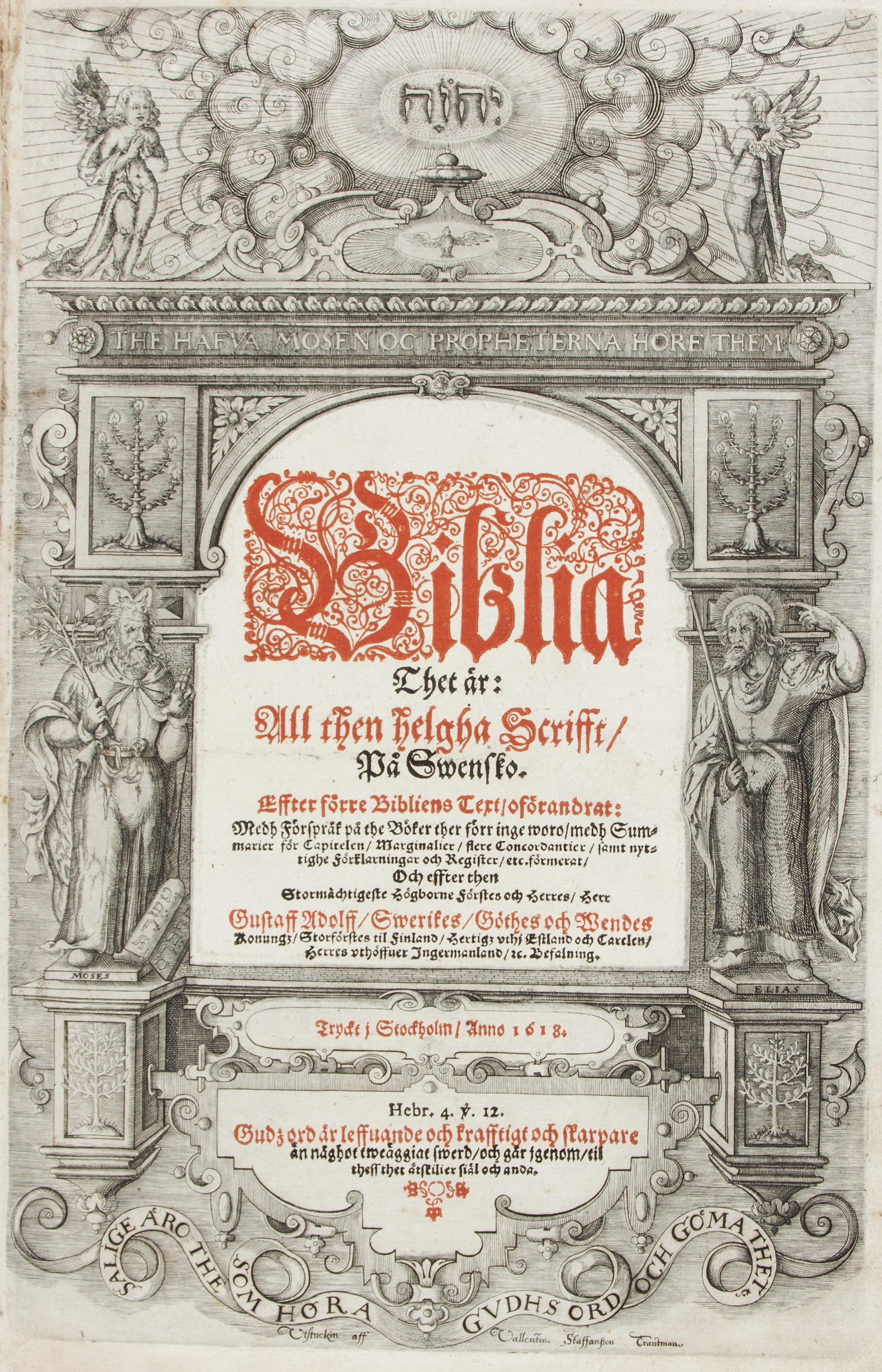
- Gustav II Adolf Bible, 1618 edition
- Full name: Biblia, Thet är: All then Helgha Scrifft, På Swensko. Effter förre Bibliens Text, oförandrat
- Language: Swedish
- Complete Bible published: 1618
- Online as: Gustav II Adolf Bible at Wikisource
- Derived from: Gustav Vasa Bible
- Revision: Charles XII Bible

The Gustav II Adolf Bible (Swedish: Gustav II Adolfs bibel; officially: Biblia, Thet är: All then Helgha Scrifft, På Swensko. Effter förre Bibliens Text, oförandrat) was published in 1618 during Gustav II Adolf's reign and was a revised version of Gustav Vasa Bible. One of the aims of the Gustav II Adolf Bible was to make the text more accessible to the reader and to add verse numbers.

In this Bible, Luther's four Antilegomena - Hebrews, James, Jude and Revelation - were separated at the end of the table of content and labeled as "Apocr(yphal) New Testament."

== See also ==
- Gustav Vasa Bible
- Charles XII Bible
