= Pedro de Alvarado =

Spanish conquistador and governor of Guatemala

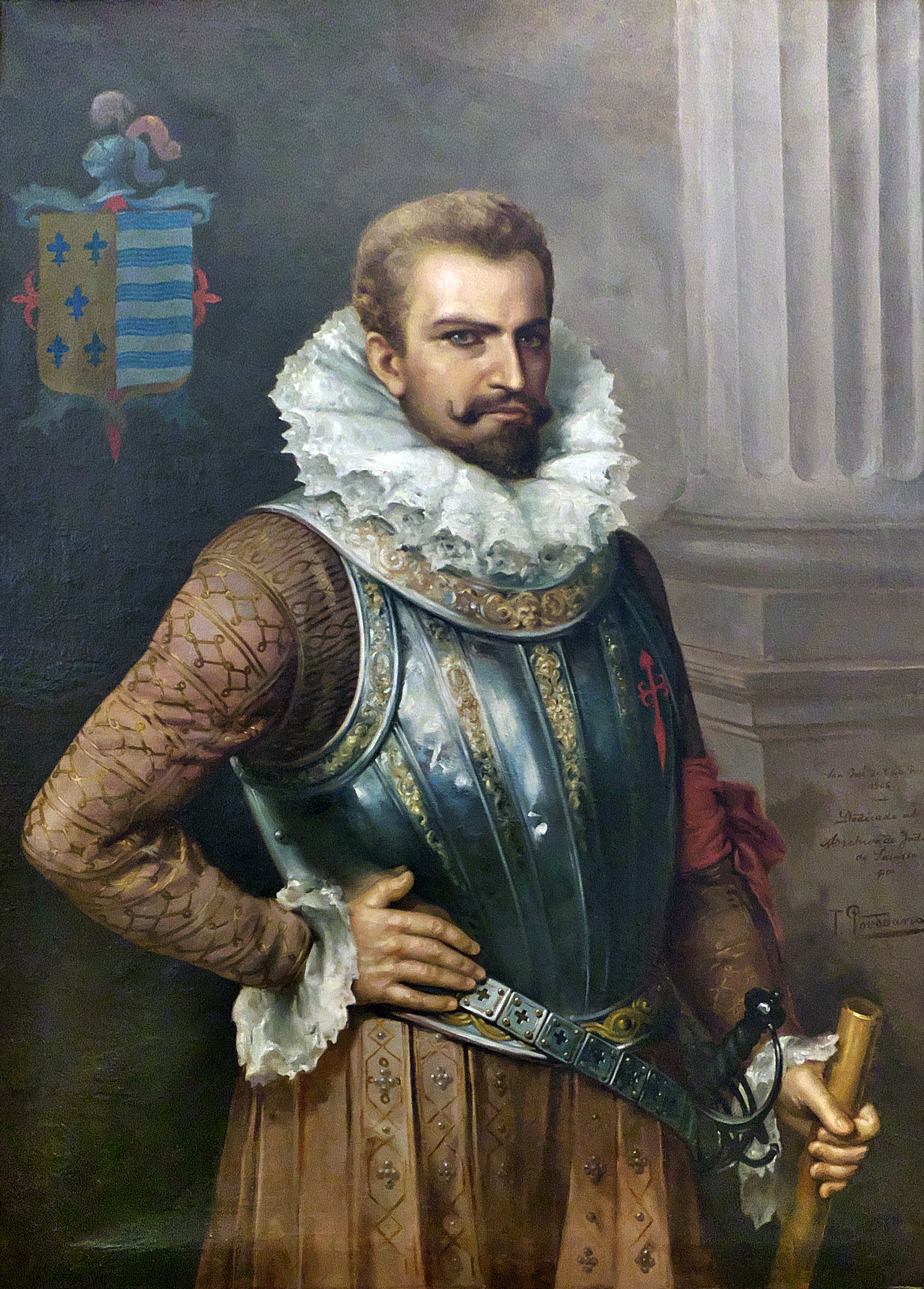
- Portrait of the adelantado Pedro de Alvarado found in Archivo General de Indias, painted by Tomás Povedano (early 20th century)
- Born: c. 1485; Badajoz, Extremadura, Crown of Castile
- Died: 4 July 1541 (aged 55 or 56); Guadalajara, Viceroyalty of New Spain
- Cause of death: Crushed by horse
- Spouses: Francisca de la Cueva (m. 1527; died c. 1532); Beatriz de la Cueva (m. 1538)
- Partner: Luisa de Tlaxcala (1519–1535)
- Children: 5 (3 with Luisa)

Signature
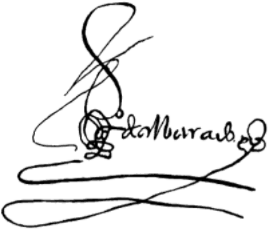

Pedro de Alvarado (Spanish pronunciation: [ˈpeðɾo ðe alβaˈɾaðo]; c. 1485 – 4 July 1541) was a Spanish conquistador, adelantado, governor and captain general of Guatemala. He participated in the conquest of Cuba, in Juan de Grijalva's exploration of the coasts of the Yucatán Peninsula and the Gulf of Mexico, and in the conquest of the Aztec Empire led by Hernán Cortés. He is considered the conquistador of much of Central America, including Guatemala, Honduras, El Salvador, and parts of Nicaragua.

While a skilled warrior who brought much of Central America under Spanish control, Alvarado developed a reputation for greed and cruelty, and was accused of various crimes and abuses by natives and Spaniards alike. In 1541, Alvarado was crushed by a horse while attempting to quell a native revolt in Mexico, dying a few days later.

== Character and appearance ==
Recolored lithograph of Alvarado in the Lienzo de Tlaxcala (circa 1550).

Pedro de Alvarado was flamboyant and charismatic, and was both a brilliant military commander and a cruel, hardened man. He is described as having "good features and bearing", and when presented with a picture of him, the Aztecs referred to him as Tōnatiuh. The Aztecs gave Alvarado this name because of his blond hair, and also his infamous temper. He was handsome, and presented an affable appearance, but was volatile and quick to anger.

He was ruthless in his dealings with the indigenous peoples he set out to conquer. Historians judge that his greed drove him to excessive cruelty, and his Spanish contemporaries denounced his extreme brutality during his lifetime. He was a poor governor of territories he had conquered, and restlessly sought out new adventures.

His tactical brutality, such as the massacre in the Great Temple of Tenochtitlan, often undermined strategic considerations. He was also accused of cruelty against fellow Spaniards. Alvarado was little suited to govern; when he held governing positions, he did little to establish stable foundations for colonial rule. His letters show no interest in civil matters, and he discussed only exploration and war. Alvarado stubbornly resisted attempts by the Spanish Crown to establish ordered taxation in Guatemala, and refused to acknowledge such attempts. As governor of Guatemala, Alvarado has been described by W. George Lovell et al. as "an insatiable despot who recognized no authority but his own and who regarded Guatemala as little more than his personal estate."

American historian William H. Prescott described Alvarado's character in the following terms:

Alvarado was a cavalier of high family, gallant and chivalrous, and [Cortes'] warm personal friend. He had talents for action, was possessed of firmness and intrepidity, while his frank and dazzling manners made the Tonatiuh an especial favourite with the Mexicans. But, underneath this showy exterior, the future conqueror of Guatemala concealed a heart rash, rapacious, and cruel. He was altogether destitute of that moderation, which, in the delicate position he occupied, was a quality of more worth than all the rest.

— William H. Prescott 1922, History of the Conquest of Mexico: Book 4, Chapter 8, p. 54.

Spanish chronicler Antonio de Remesal commented that "Alvarado desired more to be feared than loved by his subjects, whether they were Indians or Spaniards."

== Early life and family ==
Pedro de Alvarado was born in 1485 in the town of Badajoz, Extremadura. His father was Gómez de Alvarado, and his mother was Leonor de Contreras, Gómez's second wife. Pedro de Alvarado had a twin sister, Sarra, and four full-blood brothers, Jorge, Gonzalo, Gómez, and Juan. Pedro had an illegitimate half brother, also named Juan, referred to in contemporary sources as Juan el Bastardo.

Very little is known of Pedro de Alvarado's early life before his arrival in the Americas. During the conquest of the Americas, tales of his youthful exploits in Spain became popular legends, but their veracity is doubtful. An example is the tale then current that when he was a youth awaiting passage to the Americas, he climbed the church tower in Seville with some friends. A banner pole extended some 3.0 to 3.7 metres (10 to 12 ft) from an upper window. One of his companions walked out to the end of the pole after removing his cloak and sword, and returned to the tower backwards. Alvarado, afraid of being mocked, walked out onto the pole with both sword and cloak, and turned around at the end to return to the tower facing it.

Alvarado's paternal grandfather was Juan Alvarado "el Viejo" ("the elder"), who was comendador of Hornachos, and his paternal grandmother was Catalina Messía. Pedro de Alvarado's uncle on his father's side was Diego de Alvarado y Messía, who was the comendador of Lobón, Puebla, and Montijo, alcalde of Montánchez, and lord of Castellanos and of Cubillana. Diego was a veteran of the campaigns against the Moors.

== First campaigns in the Americas ==
Alvarado and his brothers crossed the Atlantic Ocean before 1511, possibly in 1510. By 1511 a system of licenses had been established in Spain to control the flow of colonists to the New World. The only one of the Alvarado brothers who appears in the registers is Juan de Alvarado, in 1511, leading to the assumption that the rest were already in the Americas by the time the licensing system was established. The Alvarado brothers stopped off at Hispaniola, but there are few mentions of their stay there in historical documents.

Soon after arriving in Santo Domingo, on Hispaniola, Pedro de Alvarado established a friendship with Hernán Cortés, who at the time was serving as public scribe. Alvarado joined Cortés to participate in the conquest of Cuba, under the command of Diego de Velázquez. The conquest of Cuba was launched in 1511, and Pedro de Alvarado was accompanied by his brothers. Soon after the invasion, Alvarado was managing a prosperous hacienda in the new colony. It is around this time that Pedro de Alvarado emerges into the historical record as a prosperous and influential hacienda-owner, already well connected with Velázquez, who was now governor of Cuba.

=== Grijalva expedition, 1518 ===
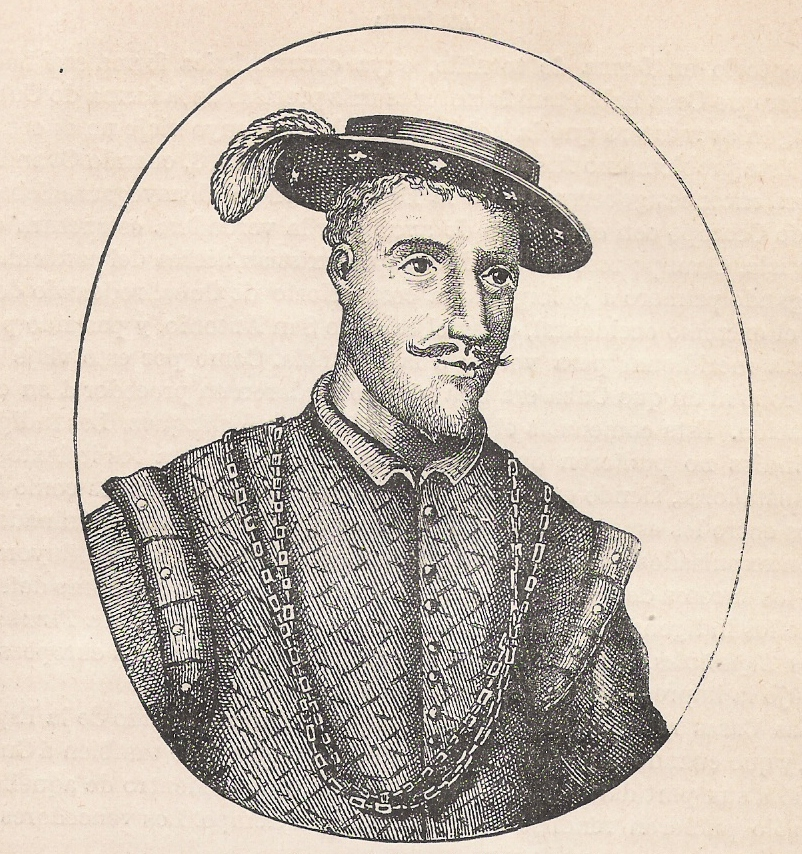
Juan de Grijalva

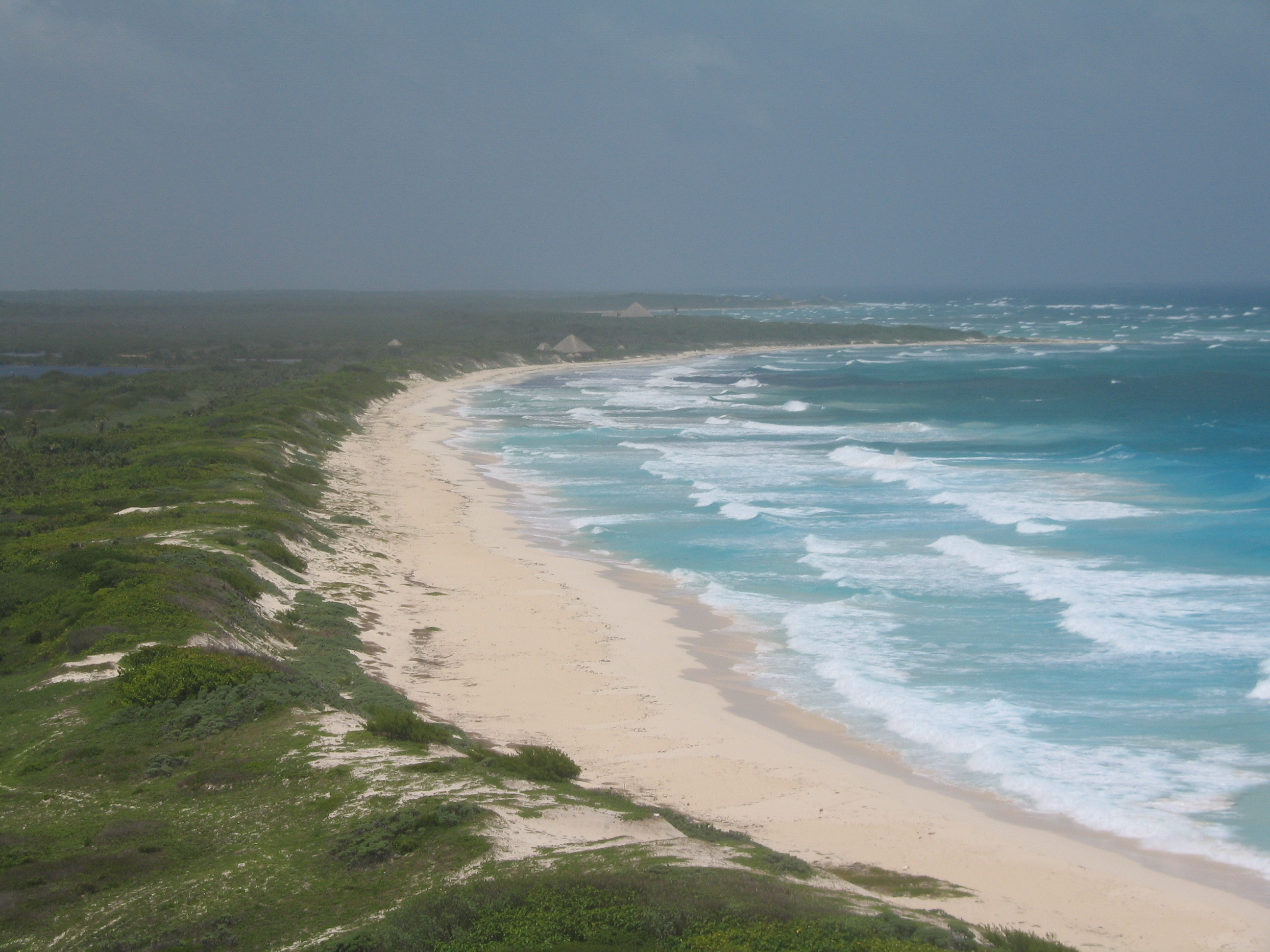
The coast of Cozumel was Alvarado's first sight of Yucatán.

Diego Velázquez, the governor of Cuba, was enthused by Francisco Hernández de Córdoba's report of gold in the newly discovered Yucatán Peninsula. He organised an expedition consisting of four ships and 260 men. He placed his nephew Juan de Grijalva in overall command; Pedro de Alvarado captained one of the ships. The small fleet was stocked with crossbows, muskets, barter goods, salted pork and cassava bread.

The fleet left Cuba in April 1518, and made its first landfall upon the island of Cozumel, off the east coast of Yucatán. The Maya inhabitants of Cozumel fled the Spanish; the fleet then sailed south from Cozumel, along the east coast of the peninsula. The Spanish spotted three large Maya cities along the coast. On Ascension Thursday the fleet discovered a large bay, which the Spanish named Bahía de la Ascensión.

Grijalva did not land at any of these cities and turned back north to loop around the north of the Yucatán Peninsula and sail down the west coast. At Campeche the Spanish opened fire against the city with small cannon; the inhabitants fled, allowing the Spanish to take the abandoned city. The Maya remained hidden in the forest, so the Spanish boarded their ships and continued along the coast.

At Champotón, the fleet was approached by a small number of large war canoes, but the ships' cannon soon put them to flight. At the mouth of the Tabasco River the Spanish sighted massed warriors and canoes but the natives did not approach. By means of interpreters, Grijalva indicated that he wished to trade and bartered wine and beads in exchange for food and other supplies. From the natives they received a few gold trinkets and news of the riches of the Aztec Empire to the west. The expedition continued far enough to confirm the reality of the gold-rich empire, sailing as far north as Pánuco River.

At the Papaloapan River, Alvarado ordered his ship upriver, leaving the rest of the small fleet behind to wait for him at the river mouth. This action greatly angered Grijalva, who feared that a lone ship could be lost. After this, the Spanish referred to the river as the Río de Alvarado ("Alvarado's River"). A little further along the coast, the fleet encountered settlements under Aztec dominion, and was met by Aztec emissaries with gifts of gold and jewels sent by the Emperor Moctezuma II.

As punishment for entering the Papaloapan River without orders, Grijalva sent Alvarado with the ship San Sebastián to relay news of the discoveries back to Cuba. Alvarado made a triumphal entry to Santiago de Cuba, with a great display of the wealth that had been gained from the expedition. His early arrival in Cuba allowed him to ingratiate himself with the Governor Velázquez before Grijalva's return. The rest of the fleet put into the port of Havana five months after it had left. Grijalva was coldly received by the governor, who Alvarado had turned against him, claiming much of the glory of the expedition for himself.

== Expedition to Mexico, 1519 ==
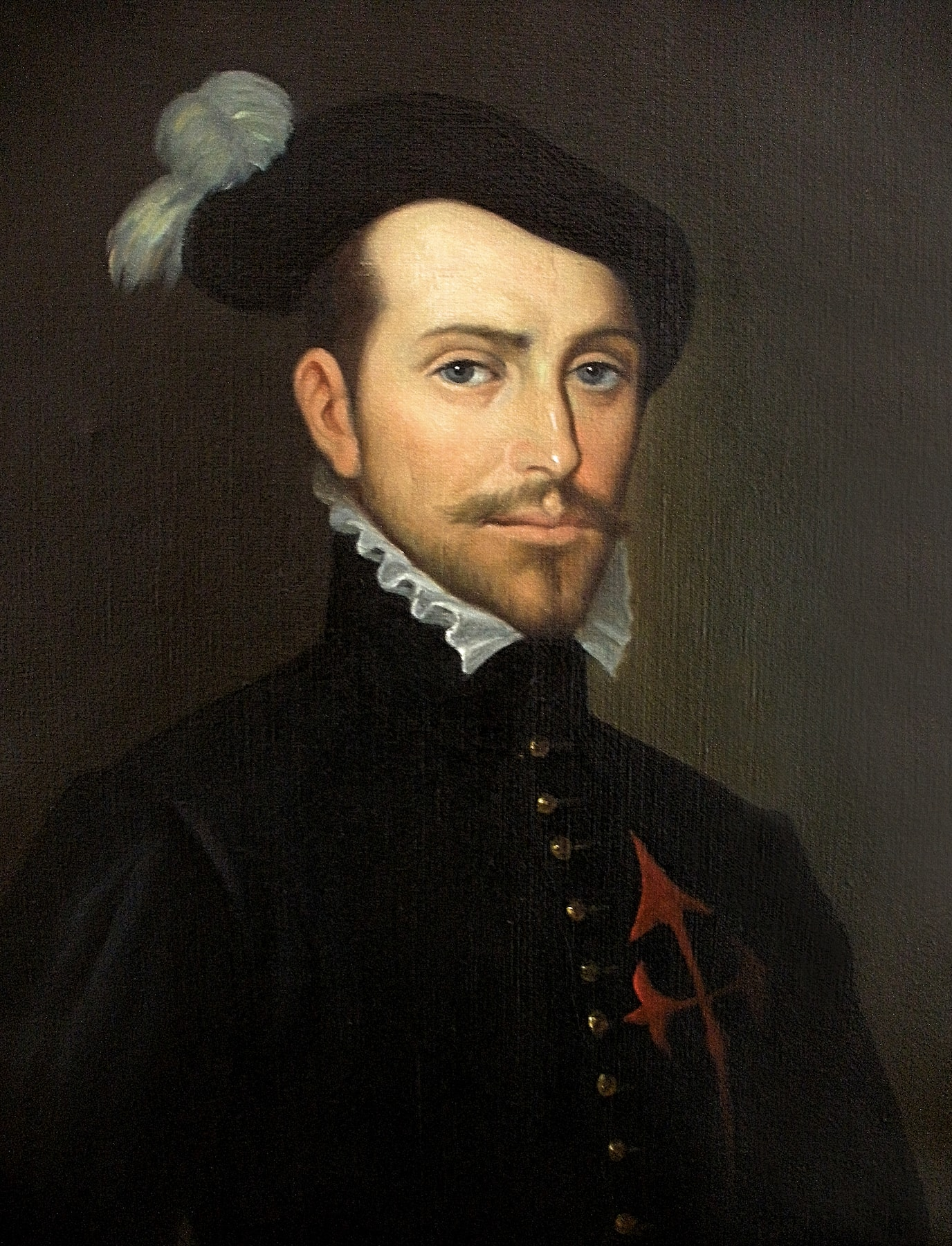
Hernán Cortés led the expedition against the Aztecs.

Grijalva's return aroused great interest in Cuba. A new expedition was organised, with a fleet of eleven ships carrying 500 men and some horses. Hernán Cortés was placed in command; Pedro de Alvarado and his brothers Jorge, Gómez and Juan "El Bastardo" joined the expedition. Cortés charged Pedro de Alvarado with gathering recruits from the inland estates of Cuba. The crew included officers that would become famous conquistadors, including Cristóbal de Olid, Gonzalo de Sandoval and Diego de Ordaz. Also aboard were Francisco de Montejo and Bernal Díaz del Castillo, veterans of the Grijalva expedition.

Alvarado once again commanded the San Sebastián, with 60 men under his orders. The fleet made its first landfall at Cozumel, and remained there for several days. Maya temples were cast down and a Christian cross was put up on one of them. From Cozumel, the fleet looped around the north of the Yucatán Peninsula and followed the coast to the Tabasco River. In Tabasco, the fleet anchored at Potonchán, a Chontal Maya town. The Maya prepared for battle but the Spanish horses and firearms quickly decided the outcome. From Potonchán, the fleet continued to San Juan de Ulua. The crew stayed only a short time before relocating to a promontory near Quiahuiztlan and Cempoala, a subject city of the Aztec Empire. Some of the Spaniards stayed near the coast when Cortés journeyed inland but Alvarado accompanied Cortés on the inland march. While marching toward Tenochtitlan, the expedition made a slight detour to travel through Tlaxcalteca lands. The Tlaxcalteca attacked the Spanish force numerous times but they were unable to rout the Spanish forces. After making an alliance with the Tlaxcalteca, the Spanish went on to conquer the Aztecs.

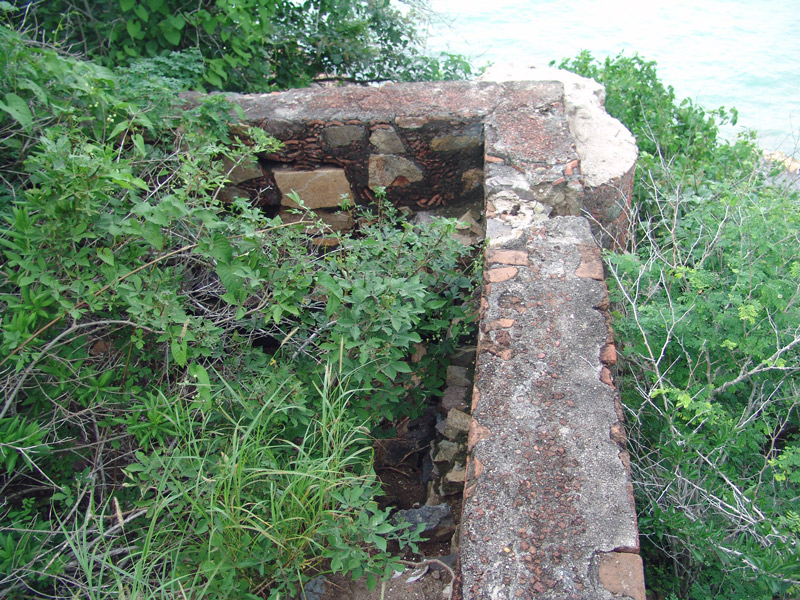
The remains of the "Castillo de Alvarado", Chamela, Jalisco

Alvarado commanded one of the eleven vessels in the fleet and also acted as Cortés' second in command during the expedition's first stay in the Aztec capital city of Tenochtitlán. Relations between the Spaniards and their hosts were uneasy, especially given Cortés' repeated insistence that the Aztecs desist from idol worship and human sacrifice; in order to ensure their own safety, the Spaniards took the Aztec king Moctezuma hostage. When Cortés returned to the Gulf coast to deal with the newly arrived hostile expedition of Pánfilo de Narváez, Alvarado remained in Tenochtitlan as commander of the Spanish enclave, with strict orders to make sure that Moctezuma not be permitted to escape.

During Cortés' absence, relations between the Spaniards and their hosts went from bad to worse, and Alvarado perpetrated the Massacre in the Great Temple, killing Aztec nobles and priests observing a religious festival. Alvarado claims he did so because he feared the Aztecs were plotting against him but there is no physical evidence to support this claim and the alleged warnings he received came from tortured captives that very likely would have said anything to make the torture stop. When Cortés returned to Tenochtitlan, he found the Spanish force under siege. After Moctezuma was killed in the attempt to negotiate with his own people, the Spaniards determined to escape by fighting their way across one of the causeways that led from the city across the lake and to the mainland. In a bloody nocturnal action of 10 July 1520, known as La Noche Triste, Alvarado led the rear-guard and was badly wounded. According to satirical verses by Gonzalo Ocampo, in reference to Alvarado crossing a causeway gap during the escape, Alvarado's escape became known as Salto de Alvarado ("Alvarado's Leap").

Pedro then participated in the Siege of Tenochtitlan, commanding one of four forces under Cortés. Alvarado was wounded when Cuauhtemoc attacked all three Spanish camps on the feast day of St. John. Alvarado's company was the first to make it to the Tlateloco marketplace, setting fire to the Aztec shrines. Cortés' and Sandoval's companies joined him there after four more days of fighting.

== Conquest of Soconusco and Guatemala ==
... we waited until they came close enough to shoot their arrows, and then we smashed into them; as they had never seen horses, they grew very fearful, and we made a good advance ... and many of them died.

— Pedro de Alvarado describing the approach to Quetzaltenango in his 3rd letter to Hernán Cortés

Cortés despatched Pedro de Alvarado to invade Guatemala with 180 cavalry, 300 infantry, crossbows, muskets, 4 cannons, large amounts of ammunition and gunpowder, and thousands of allied Mexican warriors. Pedro de Alvarado passed through Soconusco with a sizeable force in 1523, en route to conquer Guatemala. Alvarado's army included hardened veterans of the conquest of the Aztecs, and included cavalry and artillery; there were also a great many indigenous allies from Cholula, Tenochtitlan, Texcoco, Tlaxcala, and Xochimilco.

Alvarado was received in peace in Soconusco, and the inhabitants swore allegiance to the Spanish Crown. They reported that neighbouring groups in Guatemala were attacking them because of their friendly outlook towards the Spanish. Alvarado's letter to Hernán Cortés describing his passage through Soconusco is lost, and knowledge of events there come from the account of Bernal Díaz del Castillo, who was not present, but related the report of Gonzalo de Alvarado. By 1524, Soconusco had been completely pacified by Alvarado and his forces.

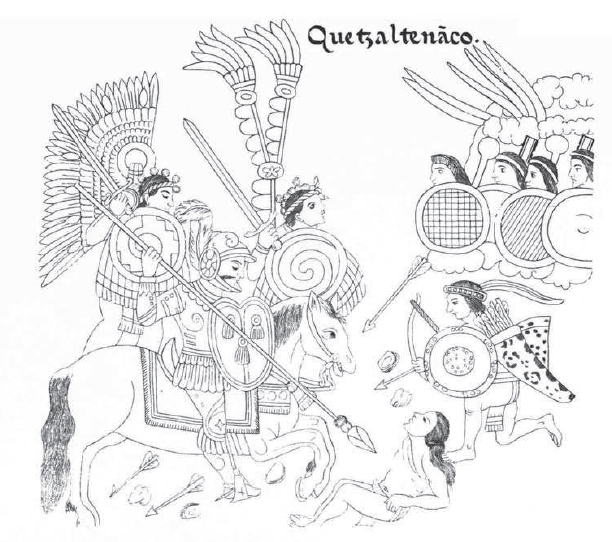
A page from the Lienzo de Tlaxcala showing the conquest of Quetzaltenango

Pedro de Alvarado and his army advanced along the Pacific coast unopposed until they reached the Samalá River in western Guatemala. This region formed a part of the K'iche' kingdom, and a K'iche' army tried unsuccessfully to prevent the Spanish from crossing the river. Once across, the conquistadors ransacked nearby settlements in an effort to terrorise the K'iche'. On 8 February 1524 Alvarado's army fought a battle at Xetulul, called Zapotitlán by his Mexican allies (modern San Francisco Zapotitlán). Although suffering many injuries inflicted by defending K'iche' archers, the Spanish and their allies stormed the town and set up camp in the marketplace.

Alvarado then turned to head upriver into the Sierra Madre mountains towards the K'iche' heartlands, crossing the pass into the fertile valley of Quetzaltenango. On 12 February 1524 Alvarado's Mexican allies were ambushed in the pass and driven back by K'iche' warriors but the Spanish cavalry charge that followed was a shock for the K'iche', who had never before seen horses. The cavalry scattered the K'iche' and the army crossed to the city of Xelaju (modern Quetzaltenango) only to find it deserted.

Almost a week later, on 18 February 1524, a K'iche' army confronted the Spanish army in the Quetzaltenango valley and were comprehensively defeated; many K'iche' nobles were among the dead. This battle exhausted the K'iche' militarily and they asked for peace and offered tribute, inviting Pedro de Alvarado into their capital Q'umarkaj, which was known as Tecpan Utatlan to the Nahuatl-speaking allies of the Spanish. Alvarado was deeply suspicious of the K'iche' intentions but accepted the offer and marched to Q'umarkaj with his army.

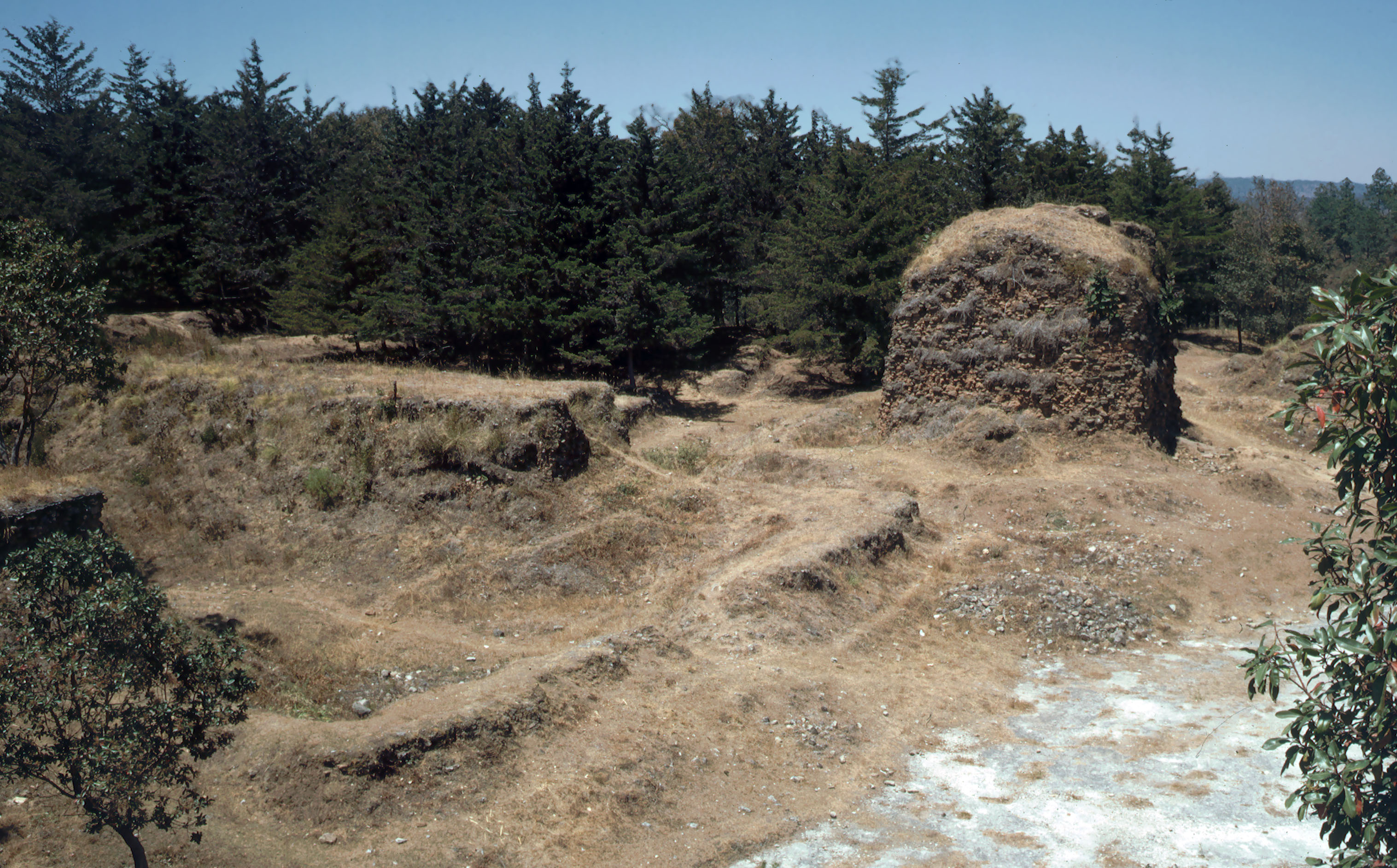
Q'umarkaj was the capital of the K'iche' kingdom until it was burnt by Alvarado's forces.

In March 1524 Pedro de Alvarado entered Q'umarkaj at the invitation of the remaining lords of the K'iche' after their catastrophic defeat, fearing that he was entering a trap. He encamped on the plain outside the city rather than accepting lodgings inside. Fearing the great number of K'iche' warriors gathered outside the city and that his cavalry would not be able to manoeuvre in the narrow streets of Q'umarkaj, he invited the leading lords of the city, Oxib-Keh (the king) and Beleheb-Tzy (the king elect) to visit him in his camp.

As soon as they did so, he seized them and kept them as prisoners in his camp. The K'iche' warriors, seeing their lords taken prisoner, attacked the Spaniards' indigenous allies and managed to kill one of the Spanish soldiers. At this point Alvarado decided to have the captured K'iche' lords burnt to death, and then proceeded to burn the entire city. After the destruction of Q'umarkaj and the execution of its rulers, Pedro de Alvarado sent messages to Iximche, capital of the Kaqchikel, proposing an alliance against the remaining K'iche' resistance.

=== Kaqchikel alliance and conquest of the Tz'utujil ===
On 14 April 1524, soon after the defeat of the K'iche', the Spanish were invited into Iximche and were well received by the lords Belehe Qat and Cahi Imox. (Note: Recinos places all these dates two days earlier (e.g. the Spanish arrival at Iximche on 12 April rather than 14 April) based on vague dating in Spanish primary records. Schele and Fahsen calculated all dates on the more securely dated Kaqchikel annals, where equivalent dates are often given in both the Kaqchikel and Spanish calendars. The Schele and Fahsen dates are used in this section. Schele & Mathews 1999, p. 386. n. 15.) The Kaqchikel kings provided native soldiers to assist the conquistadors against continuing K'iche' resistance and to help with the defeat of the neighbouring Tz'utuhil kingdom. The Spanish only stayed briefly in Iximche before continuing through Atitlán, Escuintla and Cuscatlán. The Spanish returned to the Kaqchikel capital on 23 July 1524 and on 27 July, Pedro de Alvarado declared Iximche as the first capital of Guatemala, Santiago de los Caballeros de Guatemala ("St. James of the Knights of Guatemala").

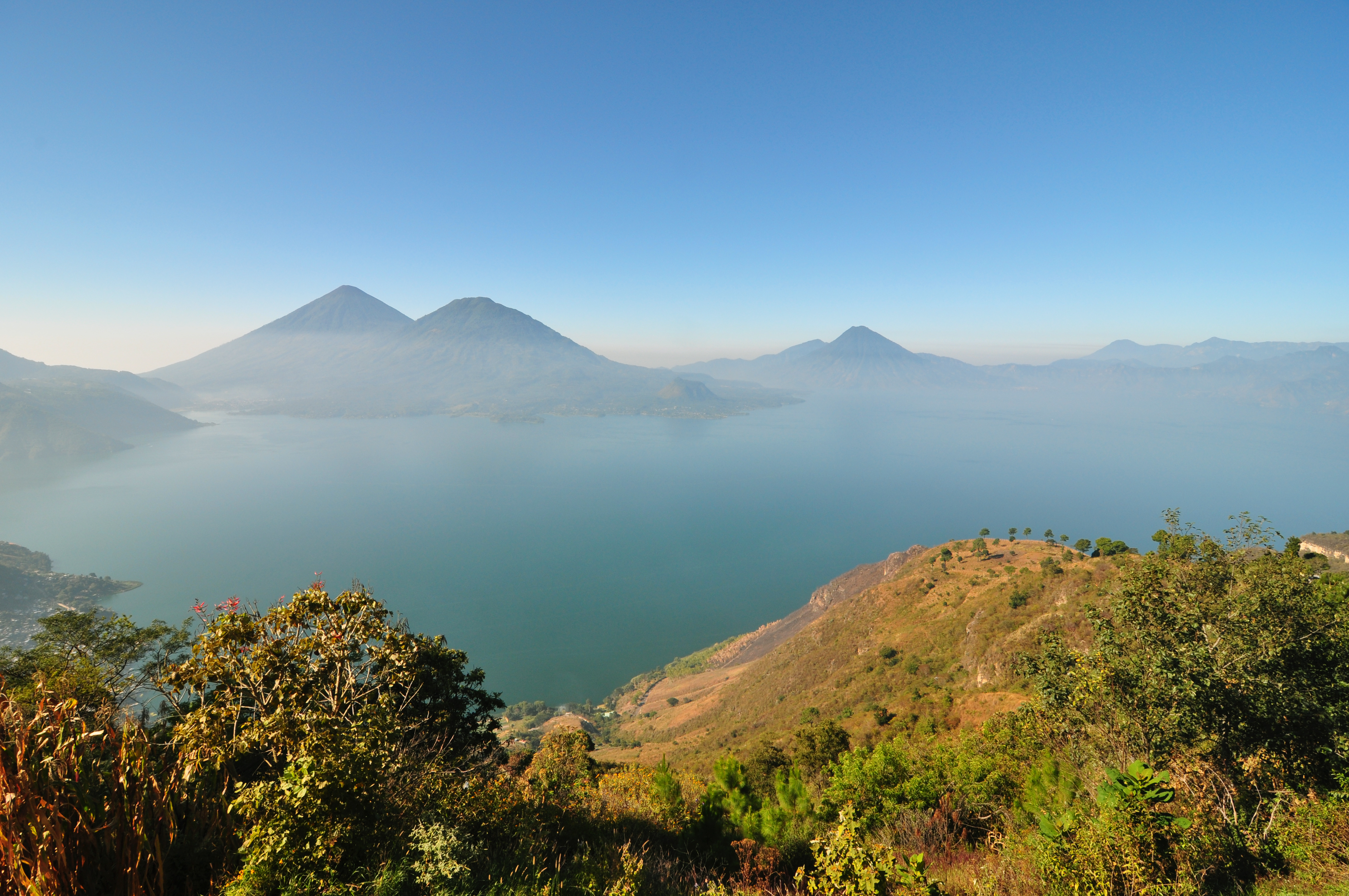
The Tz'utujil kingdom had its capital on the shore of Lake Atitlán.

The Kaqchikel appear to have entered into an alliance with the Spanish to defeat their enemies, the Tz'utujil, whose capital was Tecpan Atitlan. Pedro de Alvarado sent two Kaqchikel messengers to Tecpan Atitlan at the request of the Kaqchikel lords, both of whom were killed by the Tz'utujil. When news of the killing of the messengers reached the Spanish at Iximche, the conquistadors marched against the Tz'utujil with their Kaqchikel allies.

Pedro de Alvarado left Iximche just 5 days after he had arrived there, with 60 cavalry, 150 Spanish infantry and an unspecified number of Kaqchikel warriors. The Spanish and their allies arrived at the lakeshore after a day's hard march, without encountering any opposition. Seeing the lack of resistance, Alvarado rode ahead with 30 cavalry along the lake shore. Opposite a populated island the Spanish at last encountered hostile Tz'utujil warriors and charged among them, scattering and pursuing them to a narrow causeway across which the surviving Tz'utujil fled. The rest of Alvarado's army soon reinforced his party and they successfully stormed the island. This battle took place on 18 April.

The following day the Spanish entered Tecpan Atitlan but found it deserted. Pedro de Alvarado camped in the centre of the city and sent out scouts to find the enemy. They managed to catch some locals and used them to send messages to the Tz'utujil lords, ordering them to submit to the king of Spain. The Tz'utujil leaders responded by surrendering to Pedro de Alvarado and swearing loyalty to Spain, at which point Alvarado considered them pacified and returned to Iximche. Three days after Pedro de Alvarado returned to Iximche, the lords of the Tz'utujil arrived there to pledge their loyalty and offer tribute to the conquistadors. A short time afterwards a number of lords arrived from the Pacific lowlands to swear allegiance to the king of Spain.

=== Kaqchikel rebellion ===
Pedro de Alvarado rapidly began to demand gold in tribute from the Kaqchikels, souring the friendship between the two peoples. He demanded that their kings deliver 1000 gold leaves, each worth 15 pesos. (Note: A peso was a Spanish coin. One peso was worth eight reales (the source of the term "pieces of eight") or two tostones. During the conquest, a peso contained 4.6 grams (0.16 oz) of gold. Lovell 2005, p. 223. Recinos 1952, 1986, p. 52. n. 25.) The Kaqchikel people abandoned their city and fled to the forests and hills on 28 August 1524. Ten days later the Spanish declared war on the Kaqchikel.

Two years later, on 9 February 1526, a group of sixteen Spanish deserters burnt the palace of the Ahpo Xahil, sacked the temples and kidnapped a priest, acts that the Kaqchikel blamed on Pedro de Alvarado. (Note: Recinos 1998, p. 19. gives sixty deserters.) The Kaqchikel kept up resistance against the Spanish for a number of years. On 9 May 1530, exhausted by the warfare that had seen the deaths of their best warriors and the enforced abandonment of their crops, the two kings of the most important clans returned from the wilds. A day later they were joined by many nobles and their families and many more people; they then surrendered at the new Spanish capital at Ciudad Vieja.

=== Pacific lowlands of Guatemala ===
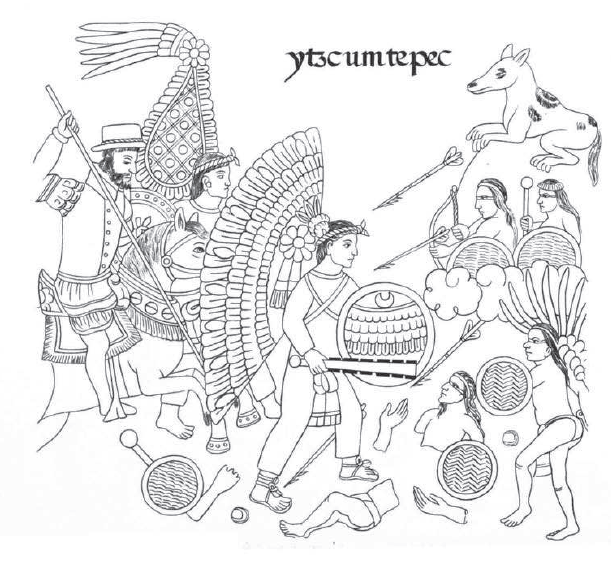
A page from the Lienzo de Tlaxcala depicting the conquest of Izcuintepeque

On 8 May 1524, Pedro de Alvarado continued southwards to the Pacific coastal plain with an army numbering approximately 6000, (Note: Most of these were native allies.) where he defeated the Pipil of Panacal or Panacaltepeque near Izcuintepeque on 9 May. Alvarado described the terrain approaching the town as very difficult, covered with dense vegetation and swampland that made the use of cavalry impossible; instead he sent men with crossbows ahead. The Pipil withdrew their scouts because of the heavy rain, believing that the Spanish and their allies would not be able to reach the town that day.

Pedro de Alvarado pressed ahead and when the Spanish entered the town the defenders were completely unprepared, with the Pipil warriors indoors sheltering from the torrential rain. In the battle that ensued, the Spanish and their indigenous allies suffered minor losses but the Pipil were able to flee into the forest, sheltered from Spanish pursuit by the weather and the vegetation. Pedro de Alvarado ordered the town to be burnt and sent messengers to the Pipil lords demanding their surrender, otherwise he would lay waste to their lands.

According to Alvarado's letter to Cortés, the Pipil came back to the town and submitted to him, accepting the king of Spain as their overlord. The Spanish force camped in the captured town for eight days. A few years later, in 1529, Pedro de Alvarado was accused of using excessive brutality in his conquest of Izcuintepeque, amongst other atrocities.

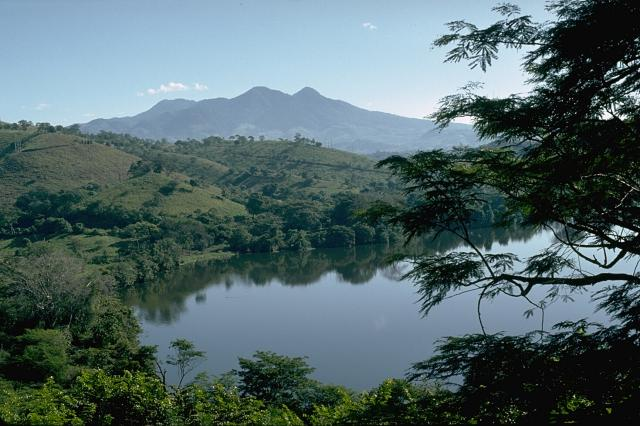
The Pacific slope of Jutiapa was the scene of a number of battles with the Xinca.

In Guazacapán, Pedro de Alvarado described his encounter with people who were neither Maya nor Pipil, speaking a different language altogether; these people were probably Xinca. At this point Alvarado's force consisted of 250 Spanish infantry accompanied by 6,000 indigenous allies, mostly Kaqchikel and Cholutec. Alvarado and his army defeated and occupied the most important Xinca city, named as Atiquipaque. The defending warriors were described by Alvarado as engaging in fierce hand-to-hand combat using spears, stakes and poisoned arrows. The battle took place on 26 May 1524 and resulted in a significant reduction of the Xinca population.

Alvarado's army continued eastwards from Atiquipaque, seizing several more Xinca cities. Because Alvarado and his allies could not understand the Xinca language, Alvarado took extra precautions on the march eastward by strengthening his vanguard and rearguard with ten cavalry apiece. In spite of these precautions the baggage train was ambushed by a Xinca army soon after leaving Taxisco. Many indigenous allies were killed and most of the baggage was lost, including all the crossbows and ironwork for the horses.

This was a serious setback and Alvarado camped his army in Nancintla for eight days, during which time he sent two expeditions against the attacking army. Alvarado sent out Xinca messengers to make contact with the enemy but they failed to return. Messengers from the city of Pazaco, in the modern department of Jutiapa, offered peace to the conquistadors but when Alvarado arrived there the next day the inhabitants were preparing for war. Alvarado's troops encountered a sizeable quantity of gathered warriors and quickly routed them through the city's streets. From Pazaco, Alvarado crossed the Río Paz and entered what is now El Salvador.

== Cuzcatlan (El Salvador) ==
Alvarado led the first effort by Spanish forces to extend their dominion to the nation of Cuzcatlan (in modern El Salvador), in June 1524. These efforts established many towns such as San José Acatempa in 1525 and Esquipulas in 1560. Spanish efforts were firmly resisted by the indigenous people known as the Pipil and their Mayan speaking neighbors. Despite Alvarado's initial success in the Battle of Acajutla, the indigenous people of Cuzcatlán, who according to tradition were led by a warlord called Atlácatl, defeated the Spaniards and their auxiliaries, and forced them to withdraw to Guatemala.

Alvarado was wounded on his left thigh, remaining handicapped for the rest of his life. He abandoned the war and appointed his brother, Gonzalo de Alvarado, to continue the task. Two subsequent expeditions were required (the first in 1525, followed by a smaller group in 1528) to bring the Pipil under Spanish control. In 1528 the conquest of Cuzcatlán was completed and the city of San Salvador was established.

== Titles and first marriage ==
On 18 December 1527, the king of Spain named Alvarado as governor of Guatemala; two days later he granted him the coveted military title of Adelantado. Alvarado's close friendship with Cortés was broken in the same year; Alvarado had promised Cortés that he would marry Cecilia Vázquez, Cortes' cousin. Alvarado broke his promise and instead married Francisca de la Cueva. Technically, this was not his first marriage as he married an indigenous woman, daughter to Xicotencatl the Elder, who was referred to as Dona Luisa by Spanish speakers and Tlecuiluatzin by Nahuatl speakers.

Francisca de la Cueva was well connected at the royal court, being the niece of Francisco de los Cobos, the king's secretary, and a member of the powerful noble house of Albuquerque. This marriage gave Alvarado extra leverage at court and was far more useful to his long term interests; Alvarado thereafter maintained a friendship with Francisco de los Cobos that allowed him access to the king's favour. In 1528, by coincidence both Alvarado and Cortés were in Seville at the same time, but Cortés ignored him.

Francisca de la Cueva died shortly after their arrival in America. Alvarado remained governor of Guatemala until his death. He was made Knight of Santiago in 1527.

== Peru ==
By 1532, Alvarado's friendship with Hernán Cortés had soured, and he no longer trusted him. At this time Alvarado requested permission from the king for an expedition south along the Pacific coast, to conquer any lands there that had not already been claimed for the Crown, and specifically rejected that Cortés should accompany him. In 1534, Alvarado heard tales of the riches of Peru, headed south to the Andes and attempted to bring the province of Quito under his rule. When he arrived, he found the land already held by Francisco Pizarro's lieutenant Sebastián de Belalcázar. The two forces of Conquistadors almost came to battle; however, Alvarado bartered to Pizarro's group most of his ships, horses, and ammunition, plus most of his men, for a comparatively modest sum of money, and returned to Guatemala.

== Governor of Honduras ==
In 1532, Alvarado received a Royal Cedula naming him Governor of the Province of Honduras. At that time, Honduras consisted of a single settlement of Spaniards in Trujillo, but he declined to act on it. In 1533 or 1534 he began to send his own work gangs of enslaved Africans and Native Americans into the parts of Honduras adjacent to Guatemala to work the placer gold deposits.

In 1536, ostensibly in response to a letter asking for aid from Andrés de Cereceda, then acting Governor of the Province of Honduras, Alvarado and his army of Indian allies arrived in Honduras, just as the Spanish colonists were preparing to abandon the country and go look for gold in Peru. In June, 1536, Alvarado engaged the indigenous resistance led by Cicumba in the lower Ulua river valley, and won. He divided up the Indian labor in repartimiento grants to his soldiers and some of the colonists, and returned to Guatemala.

During a visit to Spain, in 1537, Alvarado had the governorship of Honduras reconfirmed in addition to that of Guatemala for the next seven years. His governorship of Honduras was not uncontested. Francisco de Montejo had a rival claim, and was installed by the Spanish king as Governor of Honduras in 1540. Ten years after being widowed, Alvarado married one of his first wife's sisters, Beatriz de la Cueva, who outlived him.

After the death of Alvarado, de la Cueva maneuvered her own election and succeeded him as governor of Guatemala, becoming the only woman to govern a major political division of the Americas in Spanish colonial times. She drowned a few days after taking office in the destruction of the capital city Ciudad Vieja by a sudden mudflow from the Volcán de Agua in 1541.

== Death in the Mixtón War, 1541 ==
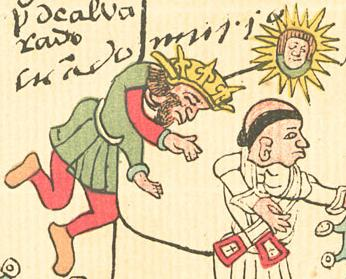
Alvarado's death, depicted in the indigenous Codex Telleriano-Remensis. The glyph to the right of his head represents his Nahuatl name, Tonatiuh ("Sun").

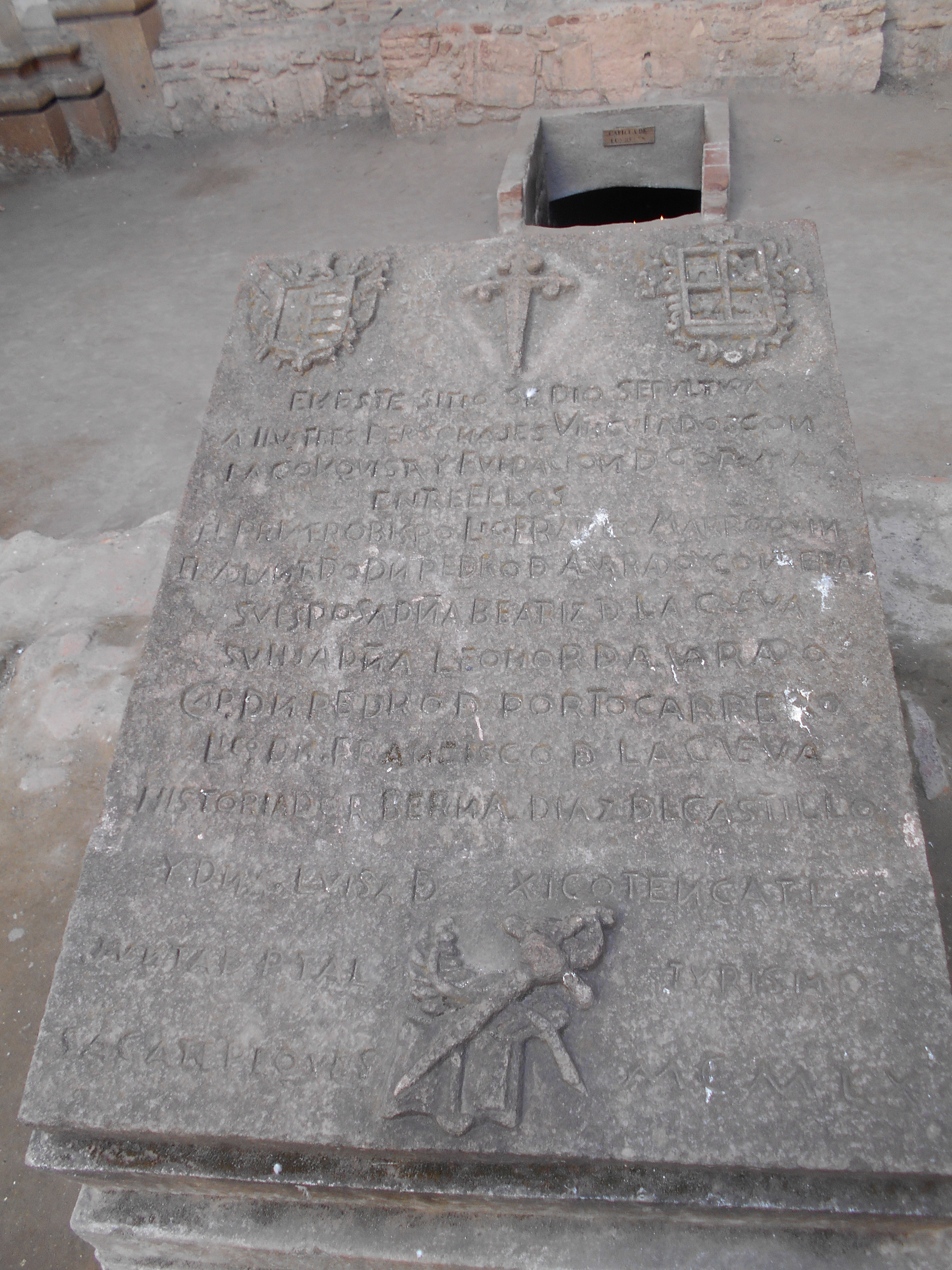
Modern memorial stone in the ruins of Antigua cathedral, marking Pedro de Alvarado's tomb

Alvarado developed a plan to outfit an armada that would sail from the western coast of Mexico to China and the Spice Islands. At great cost, he assembled and equipped 13 ships and approximately 550 soldiers for the expedition. The fleet was about to set sail in 1541 when Alvarado received a letter from Cristóbal de Oñate, pleading for help against hostile Indians who were besieging him at Nochistlán.

The siege was part of a major revolt by the Mixtón natives of the Nueva Galicia region of Mexico. Alvarado gathered his troops and went to help Oñate. In a freak accident, he was crushed by a horse that was spooked and ran amok. Alvarado lay in agony before eventually dying a few days later, on 4 July 1541, and was buried in the church at Tiripetío, a village between Pátzcuaro and Morelia (in present-day Michoacán).

Four decades after Alvarado's death, his mestiza daughter Leonor de Alvarado Xicoténcatl paid to transport his remains to Guatemala for reburial in the cathedral of the city of Santiago de los Caballeros de Guatemala, now Antigua Guatemala.

== Family ==
After the death of her husband, Beatriz de la Cueva maneuvered her own election and succeeded him as governor of Guatemala, becoming the only woman to govern a major political division of the Americas in Spanish colonial times.

Alvarado had no children from either of his legal marriages. His life companion was his concubine Luisa de Tlaxcala (also called Xicoténcatl or Tecubalsi, her original names after Catholic baptism). She was a Nahua noblewoman, daughter of the Tlaxcallan King Xicotencatl the Elder. Luisa was given by her father in 1519 to Hernán Cortés as a proof of respect and friendship. In turn Cortés gave her in guard to Pedro de Alvarado, who quickly and unremarkably became her lover. Luisa followed Alvarado in his pursuit of conquests beyond central Mexico. Despite never being his legitimate wife, Luisa de Tlaxcala had numerous possessions and was respected as a Doña, both for her relationship with Alvarado and for her noble origin. She died in 1535 and was buried at the Guatemala Cathedral.

With Luisa de Tlaxcala Pedro de Alvarado had three children:

- Leonor de Alvarado y Xicotenga Tecubalsi, born in the newly founded Spanish city of Santiago de los Caballeros, who married Pedro de Portocarrero, a conqueror trusted by his father-in-law, whom he accompanied during the conquests of Mexico and Guatemala. Portocarrero participated in numerous battles against the Indians.

Leonor married a second time, to Francisco de la Cueva y Guzman. The Alvarado fortune remained with their descendants for generations to come, in the family of Villacreces de la Cueva y Guzmán, governors of this part of Guatemala.

- Pedro de Alvarado, named for his father, who disappeared at sea when traveling to Spain
- Diego de Alvarardo, El Mestizo, who died in 1554 in the civil wars of Peru.

By other women, in more casual relationships, he had two other children:

- Gómez de Alvarado, without further notice
- Ana (Anita) de Alvarado

== References in modern culture ==
- Alvarado is portrayed in Lew Wallace's novel The Fair God. One of Montezuma's daughters falls in love with him in a dream before she had ever seen him, when they do meet he returns her love and gives her an iron cross necklace so she can convert to Christianity. She is killed during the battle of La Noche Triste. This is a rare positive depiction of Pedro de Alvarado.
- Pedro de Alvarado is identified as the torturer of Tzinacán, the narrator in Jorge Luis Borges's story The Writing of the God, first published in 1949.
- Pedro de Alvarado is a character in the historical novel The Serpent and the Eagle by Edward Rickford. The multiple-protagonist novel recounts the first few months of the Spanish-Mexica war and features a number of chapters from Pedro's point of view.
- Alvarado is portrayed by Michel Brown in Hernán, a Spanish, Nahuatl, and Maya language historical drama television series that revolves around Hernán Cortés.

== See also ==
- Black legend (Spain)
- La Noche Triste
- Mixtón War
- Spanish Conquest
- Spanish conquest of the Aztec Empire
- Tecún Umán

== Sources ==
- Alvarado, Pedro de (2007) [1524]. "Pedro de Alvarado's letters to Hernando Cortés, 1524". In Matthew Restall; Florine Asselbergs (eds.). Invading Guatemala: Spanish, Nahua, and Maya Accounts of the Conquest Wars. University Park, Pennsylvania, US: Pennsylvania State University Press. pp. 23–47. ISBN 978-0-271-02758-6. OCLC 165478850.
- Asselbergs, Florine G.L. (2004). Conquered Conquistadors: The Lienzo de Quauhquechollan, a Nahua vision of the conquest of Guatemala. CNWS publications series. Leiden, Netherlands: Research School CNWS. ISBN 978-90-5789-097-0. OCLC 491630572.
- Bandelier, Adolph Francis (1907). "Pedro de Alvarado". In Charles G. Herbermann; Edward A. Pace; Condé B. Pallen; Thomas J. Shahan; John J. Wynne (eds.). The Catholic Encyclopedia: An International Work of Reference on the Constitution, Doctrine, Discipline, and History of the Catholic Church. Vol. I (New Advent online reproduction ed.). New York: Robert Appleton Company. OCLC 1017058.
- Batres, Carlos A. (2009). Tracing the "Enigmatic" Late Postclassic Nahua-Pipil (A.D. 1200–1500): Archaeological Study of Guatemalan South Pacific Coast (MA thesis). Carbondale, Illinois, US: Southern Illinois University Carbondale.
- Burland, C. A. (1973). Montezuma: Lord of the Aztecs. London, UK: Weidenfeld and Nicolson. ISBN 978-0-297-76566-0. OCLC 791188.
- Clendinnen, Inga (2003) [1988]. Ambivalent Conquests: Maya and Spaniard in Yucatan, 1517–1570 (2nd ed.). Cambridge, UK: Cambridge University Press. ISBN 978-0-521-52731-6. OCLC 50868309.
- Díaz del Castillo, Bernal (1963) [1632]. The Conquest of New Spain. Penguin classics. translated by J. M. Cohen (6th printing [1973] ed.). Harmondsworth, England: Penguin Books. ISBN 978-0-14-044123-9. OCLC 162351797.
- Fowler, William R. Jr. (Winter 1985). "Ethnohistoric Sources on the Pipil-Nicarao of Central America: A Critical Analysis". Ethnohistory. 32 (1). Duke University Press: 37–62. doi:10.2307/482092. ISSN 0014-1801. JSTOR 482092. OCLC 478130795.
- Gall, Francis (July–December 1967). "Los Gonzalo de Alvarado, Conquistadores de Guatemala". Anales de la Sociedad de Geografía e Historia (in Spanish). XL. Guatemala City, Guatemala: Sociedad de Geografía e Historia de Guatemala. OCLC 72773975.
- García Añoveros, Jesús María (June 1987). "Don Pedro de Alvarado: las fuentes históricas, documentación, crónicas y biblografía existente" (PDF). Mesoamérica (in Spanish). 13. Antigua Guatemala, Guatemala: El Centro de Investigaciones Regionales de Mesoamérica (CIRMA) in conjunction with Plumsock Mesoamerican Studies, South Woodstock, Vermont, US: 243–282. ISSN 0252-9963. OCLC 7141215.
- Gasco, Janine (1997). "Consolidation of the Colonial Regime: Native Society in Western Central America". Historical Archaeology. 31 (1, Diversity and Social Identity in Colonial Spanish America: Native American, African, and Hispanic Communities during the Middle Period). Society for Historical Archaeology: 55–63. doi:10.1007/BF03377255. ISSN 0440-9213. JSTOR 25616517. OCLC 197892468. S2CID 164975904. (subscription required)
- Guillemín, Jorge F. (1965). Iximché: Capital del Antiguo Reino Cakchiquel (in Spanish). Guatemala: Tipografía Nacional de Guatemala. OCLC 1498320.
- Hernández, Christine; Anthony P. Andrews; Gabrielle Vail (2010). "Introduction". In Gabrielle Vail; Christine L. Hernández (eds.). Astronomers, Scribes, and Priests: Intellectual Interchange Between the Northern Maya Lowlands and Highland Mexico in the Late Postclassic Period. Dumbarton Oaks Pre-Columbian symposia and colloquia. Washington, D.C.: Harvard University Press. pp. 17–36. ISBN 9780884023463. OCLC 845573515.
- Juarros, Domingo (1808–18). Compendio de la historia de la ciudad de Guatemala (in Spanish). Vol. 2 vols. Guatemala: Ignacio Beteta. OCLC 2187421.
- Juarros, Domingo (1823). A statistical and commercial history of the kingdom of Guatemala, in Spanish America: containing important particulars relative to its productions, manufactures, customs, &c. &c. &c. With an account of its conquest by the Spaniards, and a narrative of the principal events down to the present time: from original records in the archives; actual observation; and other authentic sources (online reproduction at Internet Archive). translated by John Baily (translation of Compendio de la historia de la ciudad de Guatemala, 1st English ed.). London: John Hearne. OCLC 367922521.
- León Portilla, Miguel (2006). The Broken Spears: The Aztec Account of the Conquest of Mexico. Beacon Press. pp. 131–132. ISBN 978-0-8070-5500-7.
- Letona Zuleta, José Vinicio; Carlos Camacho Nassar; Juan Antonio Fernández Gamarro (1 January 2003). "Las tierras comunales xincas de Guatemala". In Carlos Camacho Nassar (ed.). Tierra, identidad y conflicto en Guatemala (in Spanish). Guatemala: Facultad Latinoamericana de Ciencias Sociales (FLACSO); Misión de Verificación de las Naciones Unidas en Guatemala (MINUGUA); Dependencia Presidencial de Asistencia Legal y Resolución de Conflictos sobre la Tierra (CONTIERRA). ISBN 978-99922-66-84-7. OCLC 54679387.
- Lovell, W. George; Christopher H. Lutz; William R. Swezey (April 1984). "The Indian Population of Southern Guatemala, 1549-1551: An Analysis of López de Cerrato's Tasaciones de Tributos". The Americas. 40 (4). Academy of American Franciscan History: 459–477. doi:10.2307/980856. JSTOR 980856. S2CID 147272293. (subscription required)
- Lovell, W. George (2005). Conquest and Survival in Colonial Guatemala: A Historical Geography of the Cuchumatán Highlands, 1500–1821 (3rd ed.). Montreal, Canada: McGill-Queen's University Press. ISBN 978-0-7735-2741-6. OCLC 58051691.
- Matthew, Laura E. (2012). Memories of Conquest: Becoming Mexicano in Colonial Guatemala (hardback). First Peoples. Chapel Hill, North Carolina, USA: University of North Carolina Press. ISBN 978-0-8078-3537-1. OCLC 752286995.
- Mendoza Asencio, Hilda Johanna (2011). "Módulo pedagógico para desarrollo turístico dirigido a docentes y estudiantes del Instituto Mixto de Educación Básica por Cooperativa de Enseñanza, Pasaco, Jutiapa" (PDF) (in Spanish). Universidad de San Carlos de Guatemala, Facultad de Humanidades.
- Myers, Paul A. (2004). North to California: The Spanish Voyages of Discovery, 1533–1603. Coral Springs, Florida, US: Llumina Press. ISBN 978-1-59526-252-3. OCLC 54929617.
- Polo Sifontes, Francis (1981). Francis Polo Sifontes; Celso A. Lara Figueroa (eds.). "Título de Alotenango, 1565: Clave para ubicar geograficamente la antigua Itzcuintepec pipil". Antropología e Historia de Guatemala (in Spanish). 3, II Epoca. Guatemala City, Guatemala: Dirección General de Antropología e Historia de Guatemala, Ministerio de Educación: 109–129. OCLC 605015816.
- Polo Sifontes, Francis (1986). Los Cakchiqueles en la Conquista de Guatemala (in Spanish). Guatemala: CENALTEX. OCLC 82712257.
- Prescott, William H. (1922). History of the Conquest of Mexico. Vol. 2. London, UK: Chatto & Windus.
- Recinos, Adrián (1986). Pedro de Alvarado: Conquistador de México y Guatemala (in Spanish) (2nd ed.). Guatemala: CENALTEX Centro Nacional de Libros de Texto y Material Didáctico "José de Pineda Ibarra". OCLC 243309954.
- Recinos, Adrian (1998). Memorial de Solalá, Anales de los Kaqchikeles; Título de los Señores de Totonicapán (in Spanish). Guatemala: Piedra Santa. ISBN 978-84-8377-006-1. OCLC 25476196.
- Schele, Linda; Peter Mathews (1999). The Code of Kings: The language of seven Maya temples and tombs. New York, US: Simon & Schuster. ISBN 978-0-684-85209-6. OCLC 41423034.
- Sharer, Robert J.; Loa P. Traxler (2006). The Ancient Maya (6th ed.). Stanford, California, US: Stanford University Press. ISBN 978-0-8047-4817-9. OCLC 57577446.
- Stone, Samuel Z. (1975). La dinastía de los conquistadores: La crisis del poder en la Costa Rica contemporánea (in Spanish). Ciudad Universitaria Rodrigo Facio, Costa Rica: Editorial Universitaria Centroamericana. OCLC 1933264.
- Stone, Samuel Z. (1990). The heritage of the conquistadors: Ruling classes in Central America from the Conquest to the Sandinistas (6th edition, fully revised and expanded ed.). Lincoln: University of Nebraska Press. ISBN 978-0-8032-4207-4. OCLC 20393173.
- Townsend, Richard F. (1995) [1992]. The Aztecs. London, UK: Thames and Hudson. ISBN 978-0-500-27720-1. OCLC 27825022.
