= Svenska Folkbibeln =

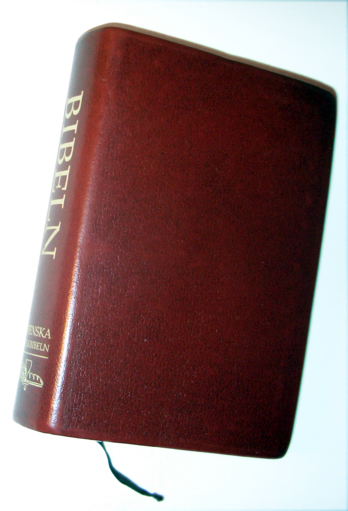
- Svenska Folkbibeln
- Language: Swedish
- OT published: 1998, 2015
- NT published: 1996, 2014
- Complete Bible published: 1998, 2015
- Genesis 1:1–3 I begynnelsen skapade Gud himmel och jord. Jorden var öde och tom, och mörker var över djupet. Och Guds Ande svävade över vattnet. Gud sade: ”Varde ljus!” Och det blev ljus. John 3:16 Så älskade Gud världen att han utgav sin enfödde Son, för att var och en som tror på honom inte ska gå förlorad utan ha evigt liv.

The Svenska Folkbibeln (Swedish People's Bible) is a contemporary translation of the Bible in Swedish. The New Testament was published in 1996 and the entire Bible in 1998. During the autumn of 2014 a revised edition of the Book of Psalms and the New Testament was published. In 2015 a minor revision of the Old Testament was released together with the 2014 revision of the New Testament, resulting in Svenska Folkbibeln 2015. In this version, the footnotes were also improved and extended. Plans exist for a more thorough revision of the Old Testament, but the 2015 edition will be the one in use for the foreseeable future.

The reason for the translation was that many conservative Christians considered the contemporary official translation, Bibel 2000, to be heavily influenced by liberal theology and higher criticism. The Old Testament is for the most part a revision of the official Swedish translation from 1917, with some fresh translations of key texts, while the New Testament is a completely new translation.
