= Battle of Sahart =

1541 battle

- Part of the Ethiopian–Adal War
Date	24 April 1541
Location	Tigray Province, Ethiopian Empire
Result	Adalite victory

Belligerents
Ethiopian Empire	Adal Sultanate

Commanders and leaders
Galawdewos	Ahmad ibn Ibrahim al-Ghazi; Garad Emar

The Battle of Sahart was fought on 24 April 1541 between the army of Emperor Gelawdewos and the forces of Garad Emar, a lieutenant of Imam Ahmad ibn Ibrahim al-Ghazi. According to Ethiopian sources, Gelawdewos was defeated.

== Prelude ==
Gelawdewos succeeded to the throne soon after his father's death on 2 September 1540. Despite his youth, over the next few months he made several successful attacks on the Adalite garrisons in northern Ethiopia. These lifted the morale of the restive Christian Ethiopians, and upon arriving in Semien, he was surrounded by the apostates and others who had joined the Imam who sought his clemency. Soon after the young Emperor crossed the Tekezé, to observe Easter in Sard. Garad Emar, Ahmad Ibrahim's governor of Ganz, assumed that Galawdewos' lieutenants would be away at their homes to celebrate the holiday, so picked this date to strike; according to Bruce, these plans were quickly communicated to Gelawdewos, who was able to prepare his own response.

== Battle ==
According to Bruce, when Garad Emar approached Sard he fell into an ambush Gelawdewos had prepared, and the governor's army was destroyed. However, Ethiopian chronicles state that Gelawdewos was defeated at Sahart. Regardless of the outcome, Gelawdewos retired back over the Takaze. Although the traditional account is that Gelawdewos retreated so far south as Shewa, C.F. Beckingham has produced evidence showing that the Ethiopian Emperor fled far to the south, over the Abay River into Gojjam, then back over the Abay to eventually reach Gindabret, "lying south of the most southerly reaches of the Blue Nile", sometime after 26 May.
