= Beatriz de la Cueva =

Spanish colonial governor

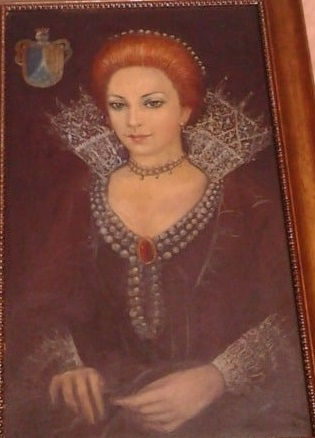

Governor of Santiago de los Caballeros de Guatemala
- In office 9 September 1541 – 11 September 1541
- Lieutenant: Francisco de la Cueva
- Preceded by: Francisco de la Cueva
- Succeeded by: Francisco Marroquín

Personal details
- Born: 1498–1500; Úbeda, Kingdom of Jaén
- Died: 11 September 1541 (aged c. 41); Santiago de los Caballeros de Guatemala, Spanish Empire
- Spouse: Pedro de Alvarado (m. 1538; died 1541)

Beatriz de la Cueva de Alvarado (c. 1498 – 11 September 1541), nicknamed "La Sinventura" ("The Unfortunate") was a Spanish noblewoman from Úbeda in Andalucia who became the governor of the Spanish colony of Guatemala for a few days in September 1541, before being killed by an earthquake shortly after taking office. Unique as the only woman to hold such a position in a major division of Spanish Latin America in colonial times, she is credited with having introduced the Spanish style of house construction and Spanish customs into Guatemala. She was buried in the cathedral of Santiago de los Caballeros de Guatemala.

== Life ==
Beatriz de la Cueva was born to aristocratic parents, probably in 1498 or 1500, in Úbeda, Jaén province, Andalusia, Spain. Her father was Luis de la Cueva, admiral of Santo Domingo and comendador of Alcántara. She was descended from Beltrán de la Cueva, 1st Duke of Alburquerque; her paternal uncle was the Duke of Alburquerque. Her mother was Maria Manrique de Benavides. Most of her brothers died in battle in Algiers. Her sister Francisca was a maid of honour to King Charles I's sister Eleanor and wife of the conquistador Pedro de Alvarado.

After Francisca died, her former husband Alvarado returned to Spain and married Beatriz on 17 October 1538. The marriage required papal authorisation because of their affinity. Another of Beatriz' uncles was Francisco de los Cobos, the personal secretary of King Charles I. He persuaded the king to intercede with the pope on the couple's behalf, and gave 1500 gold pesos as the bride's dowry.

=== Governor of Guatemala ===
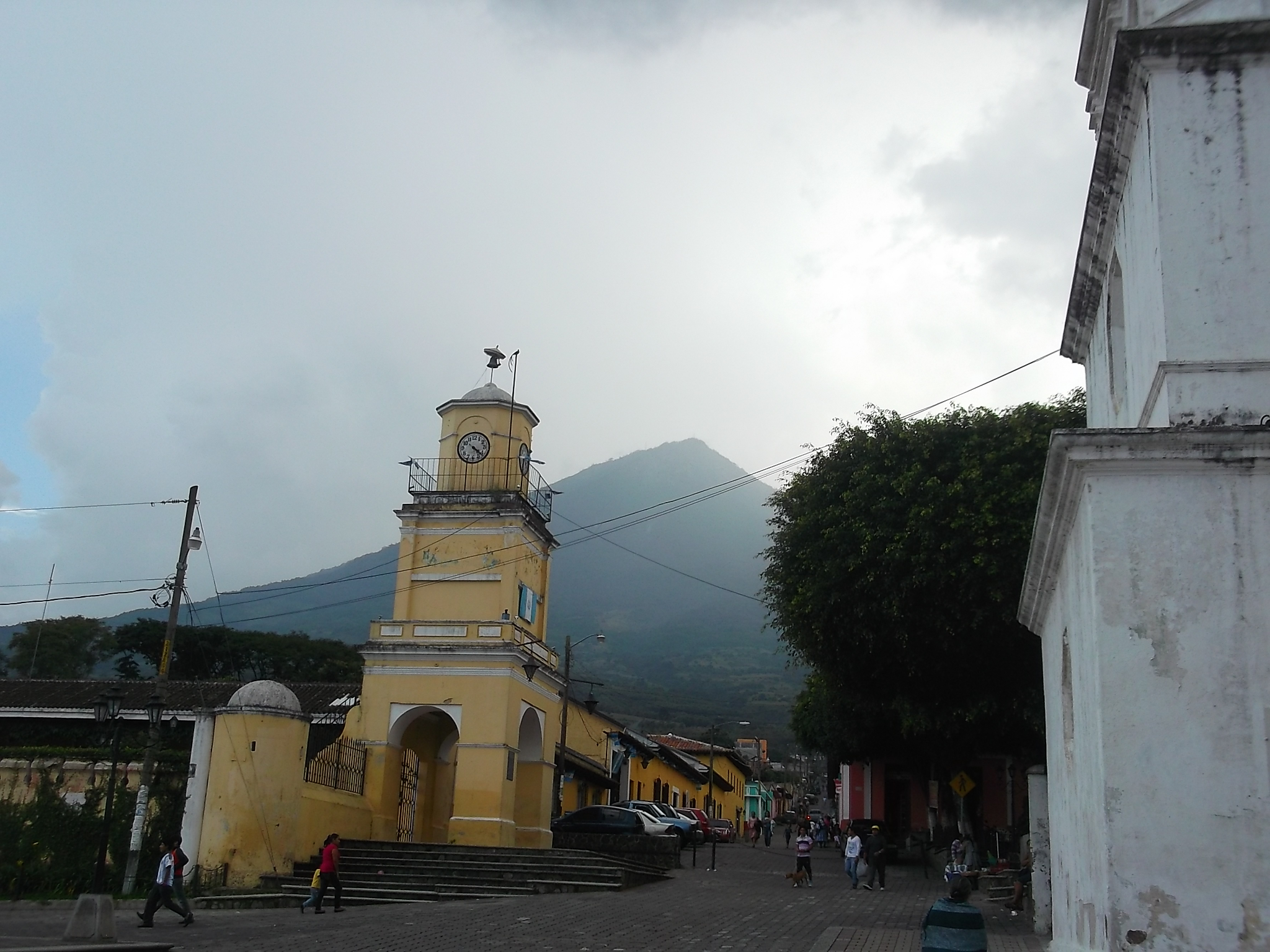
The Volcán de Agua, seen from Ciudad Vieja, the former Santiago de los Caballeros de Guatemala until the disaster of 1541 resulted in its relocation

Most of what little is known of Beatriz de la Cueva relates to Alvarado's second voyage to Spain, and her own sudden death. The couple returned to Guatemala by 1539, and her large retinue included 20 maids of honour. As Alvarado lay dying on a battlefield in Mexico in June 1541, he bequeathed both his wealth and his right to rule to Beatriz. Messengers carried the news from Mexico to Guatemala. Beatriz received them on 29 August and, distraught, ordered all her palace's internal and external walls painted black.

Beatriz de la Cueva then successfully promoted herself as her husband's successor as governor of Guatemala among Alvarado's colleagues and friends. Although Alvarado had left her brother Francisco as acting governor; she summoned him, together with bishop Francisco Marroquín, and various other officials to her palace. Claiming that the royal treasurer aspired to Alvarado's title as governor and captain-general, Beatriz demanded that they make her governor instead. After heated discussion, Beatriz was declared governor the next morning, 9 September 1541. Beatriz de la Cueva signed the documents as la sin ventura, "the unfortunate", referring to the recent loss of her husband. She soon appointed her brother Francisco as her lieutenant, entrusted with day-to-day matters, while retaining for herself all powers relating to the distribution of wealth, Indian labour, and encomiendas. Thus, she became the first female governor in the New World, although her cousin María de Toledo had previously served as vicereine of Santo Domingo.

In fact, the royal treasurer and his supporters continued to plot against her. When spies informed the newly-appointed governor, she ordered her brother to seize the plotters. The conspirators had planned to seize power in a coup early in the morning of September 11, and evaded the soldiers sent to arrest them by hiding in an abandoned house.

=== Death ===
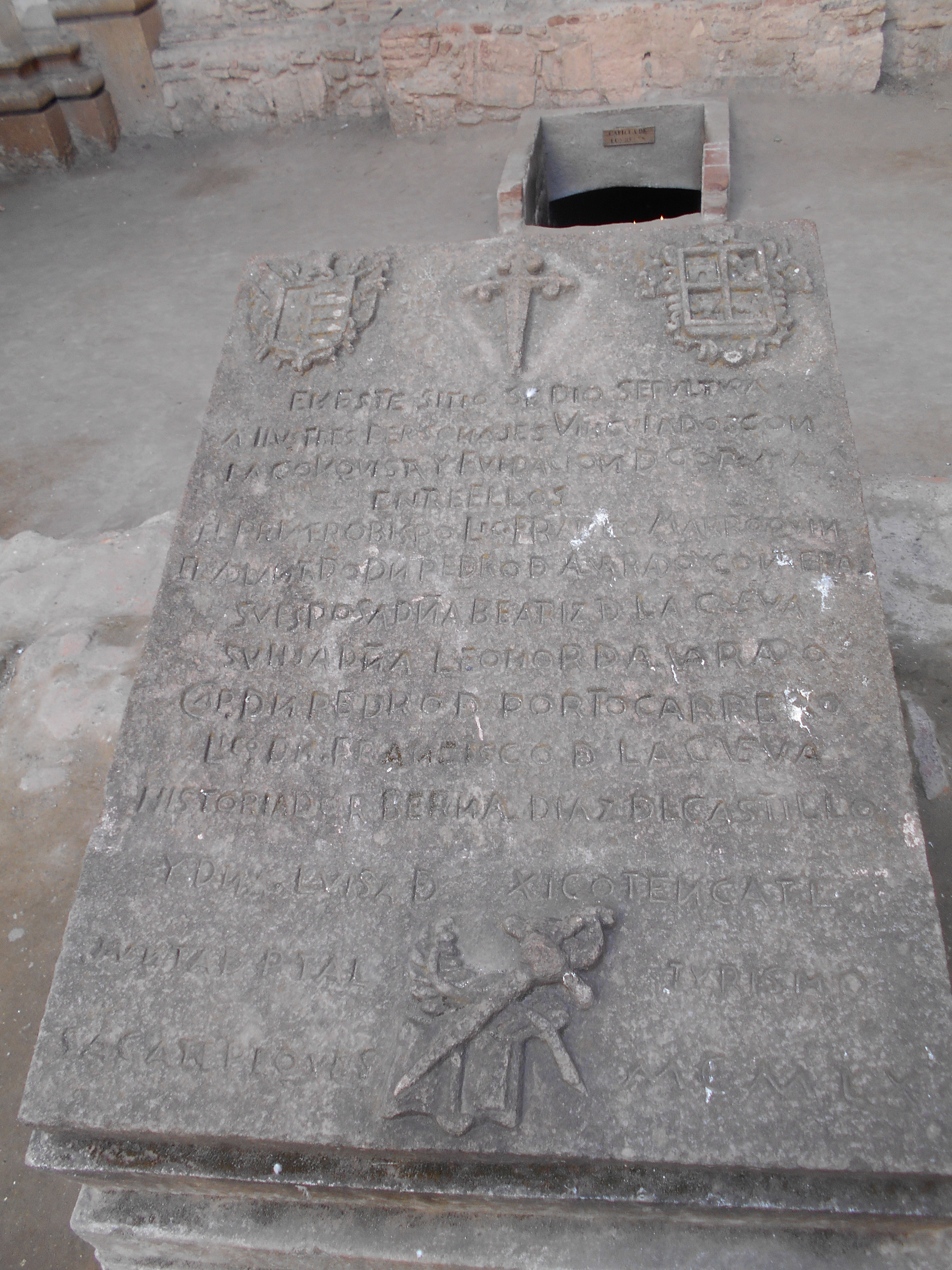
Memorial stone placed in 1960 in the ruins of the cathedral of Antigua Guatemala to mark the tomb of Pedro de Alvarado, Beatriz de la Cueva, Leonor de Alvarado and Francisco de la Cueva, among others.

Meanwhile, torrential rains combined with an earthquake led to the collapse of the crater wall of the Volcán de Agua in the early hours of 11 September. Floodwaters from the former crater lake rushed downhill along what had been a deep arroyo toward the colonial capital of Santiago de los Caballeros de Guatemala (Ciudad Vieja) in the valley below (Almolonga), carving a huge scar down the mountainside.

The three-storey stone palace had been built beside the arroyo, high on the volcano's slope, overlooking the fledgling colonial capital. Beatriz grabbed her five-year-old daughter Anica and fled to her rooftop chapel. The wall of water swept away some of the Indian servants, and Beatriz' stepdaughter Leonor who had run downstairs with other children. Leonor survived the disaster by clinging to a tree, but the other children all died. While all this was happening, the plotters were attempting to storm the palace, defended by Francisco and his soldiers. All were swept to their deaths. Beatriz and Anica died when a second tremor struck, and the roof of the chapel collapsed on top of them.

Beatriz de la Cueva was buried in the cathedral of the rebuilt Santiago de los Caballeros de Guatemala in Panchoy's valley (Antigua Guatemala) at the insistence of the bishop in spite of local opposition, and Leonor had Pedro de Alvarado reburied at her side in 1580.

== Legacy ==
Aside from briefly being the first female colonial governor in the New World, Beatriz de la Cueva is credited with introducing Spanish customs and the Spanish house style into Guatemala.

In the aftermath of her death Beatriz de la Cueva was blamed for the disaster as it was considered to be a godly punishment for her sins. Additionally her fate became a cautionary tale about the positioning of women in political positions.
