= Gustav Vasa Bible =

1541 Swedish-language Bible translation

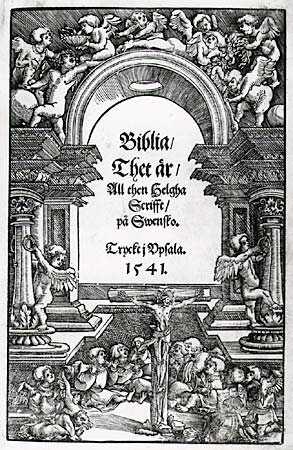
- Gustav Vasa Bible
- Full name: Biblia / Thet är / All then Helgha Scrifft / på Swensko
- Language: Swedish
- Complete Bible published: 1541
- Online as: Gustav Vasa Bible at Wikisource
- Revision: Gustav II Adolf Bible
- Genesis 1:1–3 I Begynnelsen skapade Gudh himmel och iord. Och iorden war öde och toom, och mörker war på diupet, och Gudz ande sweffde öffuer watnet. Och Gudh sadhe Warde liws, och thet wardt liws John 3:16 Ty så elskadhe Gudh werldena, at han vthgaff sin eenda Son, på thet, at hwar och en som troor på honom, skal icke förgåås, vthan få ewinnerlighit lijff.

The Gustav Vasa Bible (Swedish: Gustav Vasas bibel) is the common name of the Swedish Bible translation published in 1540–41. It was a translation of Martin Luther's German Bible. The full title, as shown in the image, is: Biblia / Thet är / All then Helgha Scrifft / på Swensko. In English, the title reads: "The Bible / That is / All the Holy Scripture / in Swedish".

The men behind the translation were Laurentius Andreae and the Petri brothers Olaus and Laurentius. Among them, Archbishop Laurentius is regarded as the main contributor.
