= Iximche =

Pre-Columbian Mesoamerican site in the highlands of Guatemala

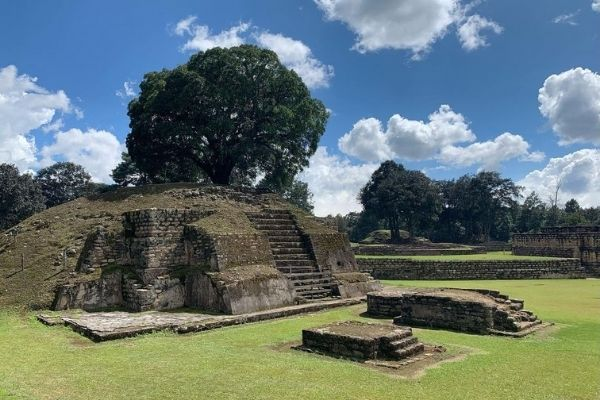
- Ruins of Iximché

- Location within Guatemala
- 14°44′8.88″N 90°59′46.32″W
- Periods: Late Postclassic
- Cultures: Kaqchikel Maya
- Location: Tecpán
- Region: Chimaltenango Department, Guatemala

History
- Built: 1470
- Abandoned: 1524
- Event: Conquered by Spain

Site notes
- Archaeologists: Jorge Guillemín

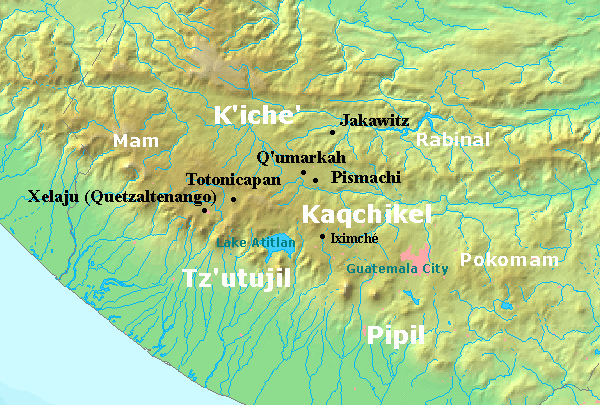
Map of the Guatemalan Highlands in the Postclassic Period

Iximcheʼ (Mayan pronunciation: [iʃimˈtʃeʔ]) (or Iximché using Spanish orthography) is a Pre-Columbian Mesoamerican archaeological site in the western highlands of Guatemala. Iximche was the capital of the Late Postclassic Kaqchikel Maya kingdom from 1470 until its abandonment in 1524. The architecture of the site included a number of pyramid-temples, palaces and two Mesoamerican ballcourts. Excavators uncovered the poorly preserved remains of painted murals on some of the buildings and ample evidence of human sacrifice. The ruins of Iximche were declared a Guatemalan National Monument in the 1960s. The site has a small museum displaying a number of pieces found there, including sculptures and ceramics. It is open daily.

For many years the Kaqchikel served as loyal allies of the Kʼicheʼ Maya. The growing power of the Kaqchikel within the alliance eventually caused such friction that the Kaqchikel were forced to flee the Kʼicheʼ capital and founded the city of Iximche. The Kaqchikel established their new capital upon an easily defensible ridge almost surrounded by deep ravines. Iximche developed quickly as a city and within 50 years of its foundation it had reached its maximum extent. The rulers of Iximche were four principal lords drawn from the four main clans of the Kaqchikel, although it was the lords of the Sotzʼil and Xahil clans who held the real power.

After the initial establishment of Iximche, the Kʼicheʼ left the Kaqchikel in peace for a number of years. The peace did not last and the Kaqchikel soundly defeated their former overlords around 1491. This was followed by infighting among the Kaqchikel clans with the rebel clans finally being overcome in 1493. Wars against the Kʼicheʼ continued throughout the early 16th century. When the Spanish conquistadors arrived in Mexico, the Aztec emperor sent messengers to warn the Kaqchikel. After the surrender of the Aztecs to Hernán Cortés, Iximche sent its own messengers to offer a Kaqchikel alliance with the Spanish. Smallpox decimated the population of Iximche before the physical arrival of the Europeans. At the time of the Spanish Conquest, Iximche was the second most important city in the Guatemalan Highlands, after the Kʼicheʼ capital at Qʼumarkaj. Conquistador Pedro de Alvarado was initially well received in the city in 1524 and the Kaqchikel kings provided the Spanish with native allies to assist in the conquest of the other highland Maya kingdoms. Iximche was declared the first capital of the Kingdom of Guatemala in the same year. Due to excessive Spanish demands for tribute, the Kaqchikel soon broke the alliance and deserted their capital, which was burned 2 years later by Spanish deserters. The Europeans founded a new town nearby but abandoned it in 1527 due to the continued hostility of the Kaqchikel, who finally surrendered in 1530.

The ruins of Iximche were first described by a Guatemalan historian in the late 17th century. They were visited various times by scholars during the 19th century, who published plans and descriptions. Serious investigations of the site started in the 1940s and continued sporadically until the early 1970s. In 1980, during the Guatemalan Civil War, a meeting took place at the ruins between guerillas and Maya leaders that resulted in the guerillas stating that they would defend indigenous rights. A ritual was carried out at the site in 1989 in order to reestablish the ruins as a sacred place for Maya ceremonies. United States President George W. Bush visited the site in 2007, and in the same year Iximche was the venue for the III Continental Summit of Indigenous Peoples and Nationalities of Abya Yala.

== Etymology ==
The site's name derives from the Mayan name of the ramon tree (Brosimum alicastrum), from the words ixim and che, meaning literally "maize tree". Iximche was called Guatemala by the Spanish, from the Nahuatl Quauhtemallan meaning "forested land". Since the Spanish conquistadors founded their first capital at Iximche, they took the name of the city used by their Nahuatl-speaking Mexican allies and applied it to the new Spanish city and, by extension, to the kingdom. From this comes the modern name of the country. The site has also been referred to as Patinamit by 19th century investigators, a Kaqchikel word meaning "the city".

== Location ==
Iximche is located 3 kilometres (1.9 mi) south of Tecpán, and 90 kilometres (56 mi) west of Guatemala City, in the northwest of the Guatemalan department of Chimaltenango. The city was built at an altitude of 2,260 metres (7,410 ft) in an easily defensible position on a ridge surrounded by deep ravines, in order to defend the city from its hostile Kʼicheʼ and Tzʼutujil neighbours. The ridge is called Ratzamut and is a promontory of Tecpán hill, a 3,075-metre-high (10,089 ft) mountain to the northwest of the ruins, which sit at the southeastern end of this promontory. The ridge is flanked by two rivers flowing in deep ravines, Río El Molino and Río Los Chocoyos, which both join to flow southwest into the Madre Vieja River, which empties into the Pacific Ocean. Geologically, this promontory is composed of steep volcanic pumice and dacitic ash deposits, creating precipitous natural cliffs that provided the late Postclassic Kaqchikel kingdom with a highly defensive topographic enclave above the upper Madre Vieja River basin. Iximche is located among pine forests common to highland Guatemala.

== Political organization ==
The Kaqchikel kingdom itself was divided among four clans that between them contained ten principal lineages or "big houses". The clans themselves were the Xahil, who were the main branch of the Kaqchikel, the Sotzʼil, the Tukuche and the Akajal.

The rulers of Iximche were four principal lords with the titles of Ahpo Sotzʼil, Ahpo Xahil, Kʼalel Achi and Ahuchan, although in reality it was the first two of these that held the real power. The two main clans of the Kaqchikel people each provided a leader, one was the Ahpo Sotzʼil ("Lord of the Sotzʼil") and the other was the Ahpo Xahil. These royal titles were originally bestowed upon the leaders of the Xahil and Sotzʼil clans by the Kʼicheʼ in gratitude for their military services to the Kʼicheʼ Kingdom of Qʼumarkaj. Both leaders were supposed to be equal in rank but in practice the Sotzʼil king was the senior (or nabʼey al, "firstborn child") while the king of the Xahil was subordinate (the chipil al, "lastborn child"). The Kʼalel Achi and the Ahuchan were the other two lords, which translate from Kaqchikel as the "principal person" and the "speaker". The Kaqchikel document Testamento de los Xpantzay gives alternate titles for two of the four lords. This document lists the Ahpo Sotzʼil and the Ahpo Xahil as the two most important, the other two lords were drawn from two additional clans and were the Ahpo Tukuche ("Lord of the Tukuche") and the Ahpo Raxonihay ("Lord of the Raxonihay").

The titles of Ahpo Sotzʼil and Ahpo Xahil were passed from father to son. The Xahil heir bore the title Ahpop Achi Ygich, and the Sotzʼil heir bore the title Ahpop Achi Balam. They were important positions in their own right and the heirs were military leaders who commanded on the battlefield.

When Iximche was founded in the late 15th century AD Wuqu-Batzʼ was Ahpo Sotzʼil, Hun-Toh was Ahpo Xahil, Chuluk was Kʼalel Achi and Xitamel-Keh was Ahuchan. According to the early Colonial Kaqchikel document Memorial de Sololá, the last two of these were not very important. Each of the four lords had his own section in the new city that included his palace, royal court and temples.

== Known rulers ==
Ahpo Sotzʼil	Ahpo Xahil	Kʼalel Achi	Ahuchan
Wuqu-Batzʼ	Hun-Toh	Chuluk	Xitamel-Keh
Oxlahuh-Tzʼiʼ	Lahuh-Ah		
Oxlahuh-Tzʼiʼ	Kablahuh-Tihax		
Hun-Iqʼ	Lahuh-Noh		
Cahi Imox	Belehe Qat		

== History ==
=== Early history ===
Archaeologists only found traces of one pre-Kaqchikel occupational phase and this was an ancient level dating to the Late Preclassic. Occasional Early and Late Classic remains have been found but they are incidental and do not represent a Classic Period occupation of the site.

=== Late Postclassic history ===
The Kaqchikel people were closely related to the Kʼicheʼ, their former allies. The Kʼicheʼan peoples (including the Kaqchikel, the Kʼicheʼ and others) had received strong influences from central Mexico since the time of the great Early Classic metropolis of Teotihuacan. The history of Iximche is largely drawn from the Annals of the Kaqchikels, a document written in the Kaqchikel language but using Latin characters soon after the Spanish Conquest. This document details the origins, history and conquest of the Kaqchikels. The Kaqchikel served as close allies of the Kʼicheʼ for many years. The Kaqchikel rulers Hun-Toh and Wuqu-Batzʼ served the great Kʼicheʼ king Kʼiqʼab with such loyalty that he rewarded them with the royal titles Ahpo Sotzʼil and Ahpo Xahil and the power to rule. The sons of Kʼiqʼab became jealous of the growing power of the Kaqchikel lords and led a revolt against their father that seriously damaged his authority. This revolt had serious consequences for the Kʼicheʼ as their conquered domains seized the opportunity to break free from their subjugation.

A minor incident in the Kʼicheʼ capital Qʼumarkaj escalated to have important consequences. A Kʼicheʼ soldier tried to seize bread from a Kaqchikel woman who was selling it in the market. The woman refused the soldier and drove him off with a stick. The Kaqchikel demanded the execution of the Kʼicheʼ soldier while the Kʼicheʼ nobility demanded the punishment of the Kaqchikel bread seller. When the Kaqchikel lords refused to hand her over, the Kʼicheʼ lords sentenced Hun-Toh and Wuqu-Batzʼ to death against the wishes of the Kʼicheʼ king Kʼiqʼab. King Kʼiqʼab warned his Kaqchikel friends and advised them to flee Qʼumarkaj. On the day 13 Iqʼ of the Kaqchikel calendar the four lords of the Kaqchikel led their people out of the Kʼicheʼ capital to found their own capital at Iximche. The exact year of this event is not known with certainty but is believed to have been between AD 1470 and 1485, with some scholars, such as Guillemín, preferring 1470. The Kaqchikel abandoned their previous capital Chiavar (speculated to be modern Chichicastenango) because it was too close to Qʼumarkaj.

Kʼiqʼab prevented his nobles from making war on the Kaqchikel for the remainder of his life, giving his former allies the time to establish their own kingdom and prepare its defences. When Hun-Toh died he was succeeded by his son Lahuh-Ah. Lahuh-Ah died in 1488 and was replaced by Kablahuh-Tihax. Oxlahuh-Tzʼiʼ, the son of Wuqu-Batzʼ, had a long and successful reign and lived through the reigns of two of his co-rulers.

The Kaqchikel kings Oxlahuh-Tzʼiʼ and Kablahuh-Tihax gained a definitive victory over the Kʼicheʼ around 1491 when they captured the Kʼicheʼ kings Tepepul and Itzayul together with the idol of their most important deity Tohil. The captured Kʼicheʼ kings were sacrificed together with a number of nobles and high-ranking soldiers, including the son and grandson of the king. After this defeat of the Kʼicheʼ, two Kaqchikel clans rebelled, the Akahal and the Tukuche. The kings Oxlahuh-Tzʼiʼ and Kablahuh-Tihax crushed the rebellion on 20 May 1493.

Oxlahuh-Tzʼiʼ died on 23 July 1508 and was succeeded by his son Hun-Iqʼ. Kablahuh-Tihax died on 4 February 1509 and was succeeded by his son Lahuh-Noh. The Kaqchikel continued their wars against the Kʼicheʼ kingdom over the following decade. The Aztec emperor Moctezuma II sent messengers to the Kaqchikel in 1510, warning of strangers in the Caribbean. In 1512 he sent another messenger (named as Witzʼitzʼil) warning of the arrival of the Spanish in Yucatán and Veracruz.

In 1513 the Kaqchikel suffered from a plague of locusts. The following year, in 1514, Iximche was severely damaged by a fire. A plague, described as terrible in the Annals of the Kaqchikel, struck the city in 1519 and lasted two years, resulting in a large number of deaths. This was likely to have been smallpox brought to the Americas with the Spanish. After the Aztec capital Tenochtitlan fell to the Spanish onslaught in 1521, the Kaqchikel sent messengers to Hernán Cortés offering an alliance with the Spanish.

On 11 August 1521, Belehe Qat and Cahi Imox were chosen as lords of the city after the deaths of Hun-Iqʼ and Lahuh-Noh, the previous kings. Cahi Imox was the Ahpo Sotzʼil and Belehe Qat was the Ahpo Xahil. On the eve of the Spanish Conquest, the Kaqchikel kingdom based at Iximche was still expanding into areas formerly controlled by the Kʼicheʼ and it was rapidly becoming the most powerful new kingdom in the Guatemalan Highlands. It was second in importance only to the Kʼicheʼ capital at Qʼumarkaj.

=== Spanish Conquest ===
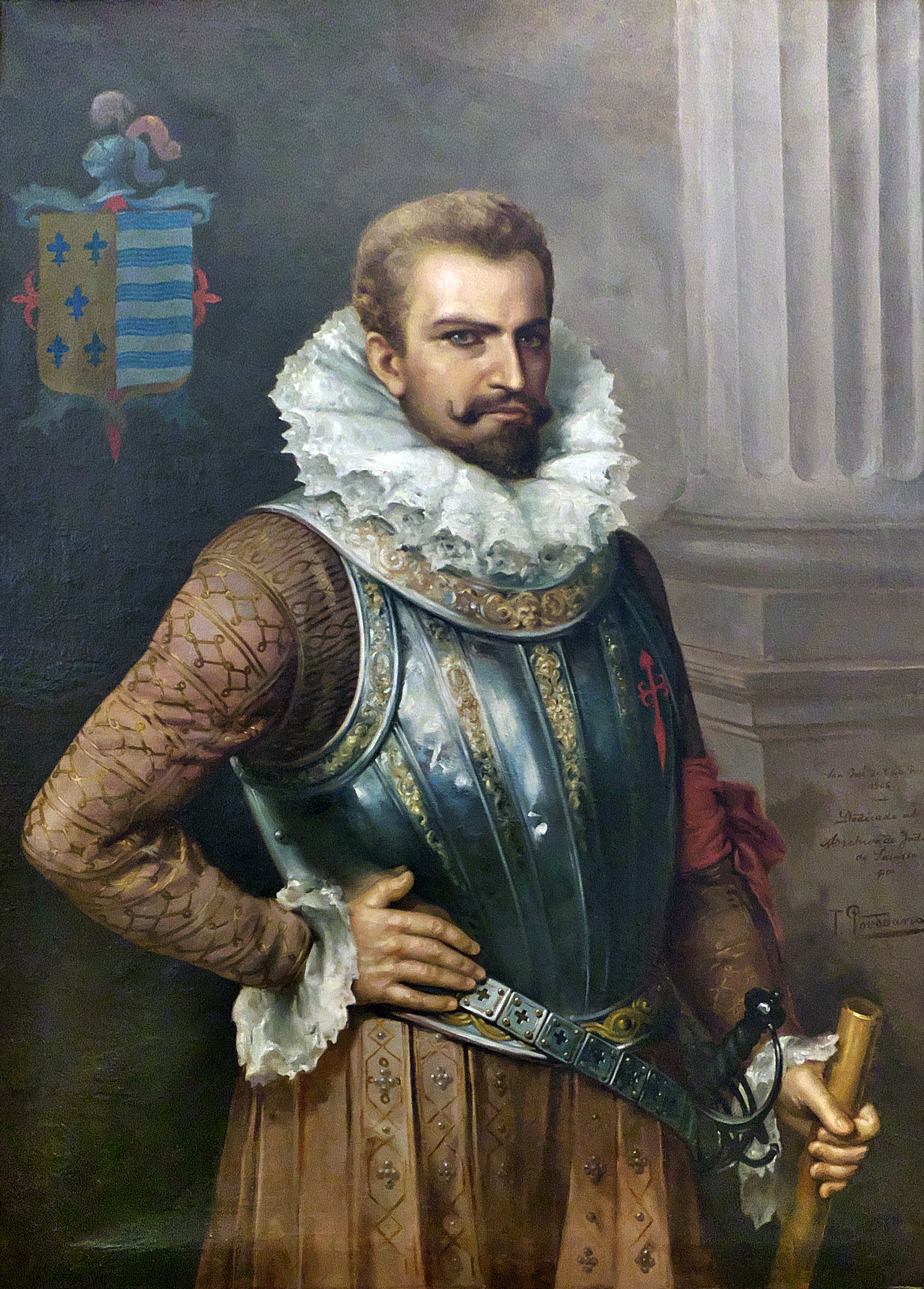
Conquistador Pedro de Alvarado was initially welcomed into Iximche with open arms.

When Spanish conquistador Pedro de Alvarado arrived in what is now Guatemala in 1524, 3 years after the conquest of the Aztecs, he found the highland Maya kingdoms weakened by twenty years of warfare and swept by the first European plagues. In the period of February to March 1524 he fought and completely defeated the Kʼicheʼ, razed Qʼumarkaj and executed the Kʼicheʼ kings. The Spanish were invited into Iximche on 14 April 1524 and were well received by the lords Belehe Qat and Cahi Imox. The Kaqchikel kings provided native soldiers to assist the conquistadors against continuing Kʼicheʼ resistance and to help with the defeat of the neighbouring Tzʼutuhil kingdom. The Spanish only stayed briefly in Iximche before continuing through Atitlán, Escuintla and Cuscatlán. The Spanish returned to the Kaqchikel capital on 23 July 1524 and on 27 July (1 Qʼat in the Kaqchikel calendar) Pedro de Alvarado declared Iximche as the first capital of Guatemala, Santiago de los Caballeros de Guatemala ("St. James of the Knights of Guatemala").

Pedro de Alvarado rapidly began to demand gold in tribute from the Kaqchikels, souring the friendship between the two peoples. He demanded that the Kaqchikel kings deliver 1000 gold leaves each of 15 pesos. A Kaqchikel priest foretold that the Kaqchikel gods would destroy the Spanish and the Kaqchikel people abandoned their city and fled to the forests and hills on 28 August 1524 (7 Ahmak in the Kaqchikel calendar). Ten days later the Spanish declared war on the Kaqchikel. A couple of years later, on 9 February 1526, a group of sixteen Spanish deserters burnt the palace of the Ahpo Xahil, sacked the temples and kidnapped a priest, acts that the Kaqchikel blamed on Pedro de Alvarado. Conquistador Bernal Díaz del Castillo recounted how in 1526 he returned to Iximche and spent the night in the "old city of Guatemala" together with Luis Marín and other members of Hernán Cortés's expedition to Honduras. He reported that the houses of the city were still in excellent condition, his account was the last description of the city while it was still inhabitable.

The Spanish founded a new town at Tecpán Guatemala, with Tecpán being Nahuatl for "palace", so the name of the new town translated as "the palace among the trees". The inhabitants of Iximche were dispersed, with some being moved to Tecpán, others to Sololá and to other towns around Lake Atitlán.

The Spaniards abandoned Tecpán in 1527, due to the continuous Kaqchikel attacks, and moved to the Almolonga Valley to the east, refounding their capital on the site of today's San Miguel Escobar district of Ciudad Vieja, near Antigua Guatemala.

The Kaqchikel kept up resistance against the Spanish for a number of years but on 9 May 1530 the two kings of the most important clans returned from the wilds. A day later they were joined by many nobles and their families and many more people came with them to surrender at the new Spanish capital at Ciudad Vieja.

=== Modern history ===
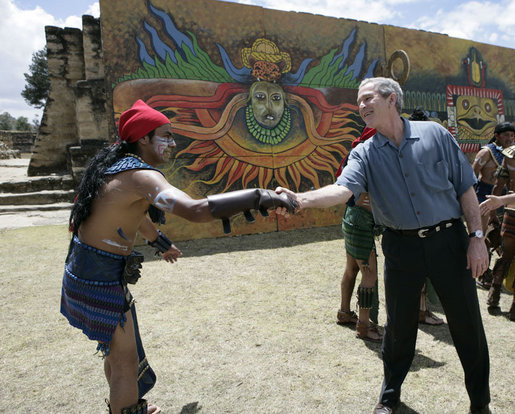
US President George W. Bush at Iximche in 2007

The ruins were described by Guatemalan historian Francisco Antonio de Fuentes y Guzmán in 1695. Miguel Rivera Maestre published some plans and views of the ruins in 1834 in his Atlas del Estado de Guatemala ("Atlas of the State of Guatemala"). American diplomat and writer John Lloyd Stephens described the ruins, which he called Patinamit, after he visited Iximche with English artist Frederick Catherwood and in 1840. Catherwood never published any drawings of the site and Stephens reported that the locals had plundered the stone at the site for many years in order to use it for building materials in Tecpán. French architect Cesar Daly mapped Iximche in 1857.

In Spanish Colonial times Iximche was the focus of a syncretic cult worshipping a relic from the ruins that had been transferred to the church in Tecpán. As late as the 19th century processions to the ruins from Tecpán took place every Good Friday. This cult had died out by the time of the Guatemalan Civil War in the late 20th century.

Alfred P. Maudslay visited Iximche in 1887 and referred to it both as Patinamit and Iximche. He carried out a site survey and published a plan of the ruins. Robert Wauchope carried out a ceramic study of Iximche in the 1940s on behalf of the Middle American Research Institute of Tulane University and published his work in 1948–1949. Historian Janos de Szecsy began excavations at the ruins in January 1956. The remains of the city were excavated by Swiss-Guatemalan archaeologist George (Jorge) Guillemín from 1959 to 1972. Guillemín published his work in 1959, 1967 and 1969. The excavation and restoration of the ruins was funded by the Guatemalan Committee for Reconstruction of National Monuments until July 1961, after 1963 the investigations were funded by the Swiss National Foundation for Scientific Research. Guillemín died before his investigations could be completed and his full report published. His field notes were finally published in 2003.

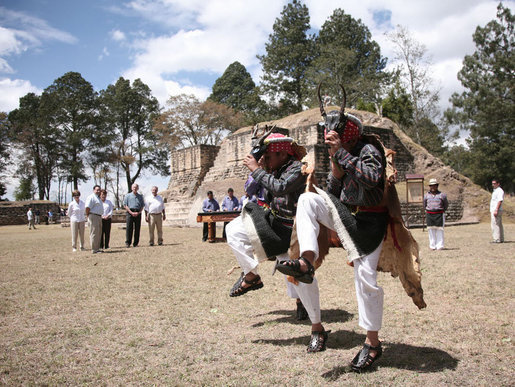
Dancers and marimba performing at Iximche for the 2007 visit of the presidents of Guatemala and the United States

In 1960 the ruins of Iximche were declared a National Monument under governmental decree 1360 of the Congress of the Republic of Guatemala, published in May 1963. In 1980, during the Guatemalan Civil War, the ruins were chosen as a meeting place between Maya leaders and the guerillas, as a result of which the guerillas stated explicitly that they would defend indigenous rights in the so-called "Declaration of Iximche". In 1989 an important Maya ceremony was carried out at the site in order to reestablish the ruins as a sacred place for indigenous ceremonies.

From 26–30 March 2007 Iximche was the site of the III Continental Summit of Indigenous Peoples and Nationalities of Abya Yala. The meeting's closing "Declaration of Iximche" committed delegates to a struggle for social justice and against "neoliberalism and other forms of oppression."

== Tourism ==
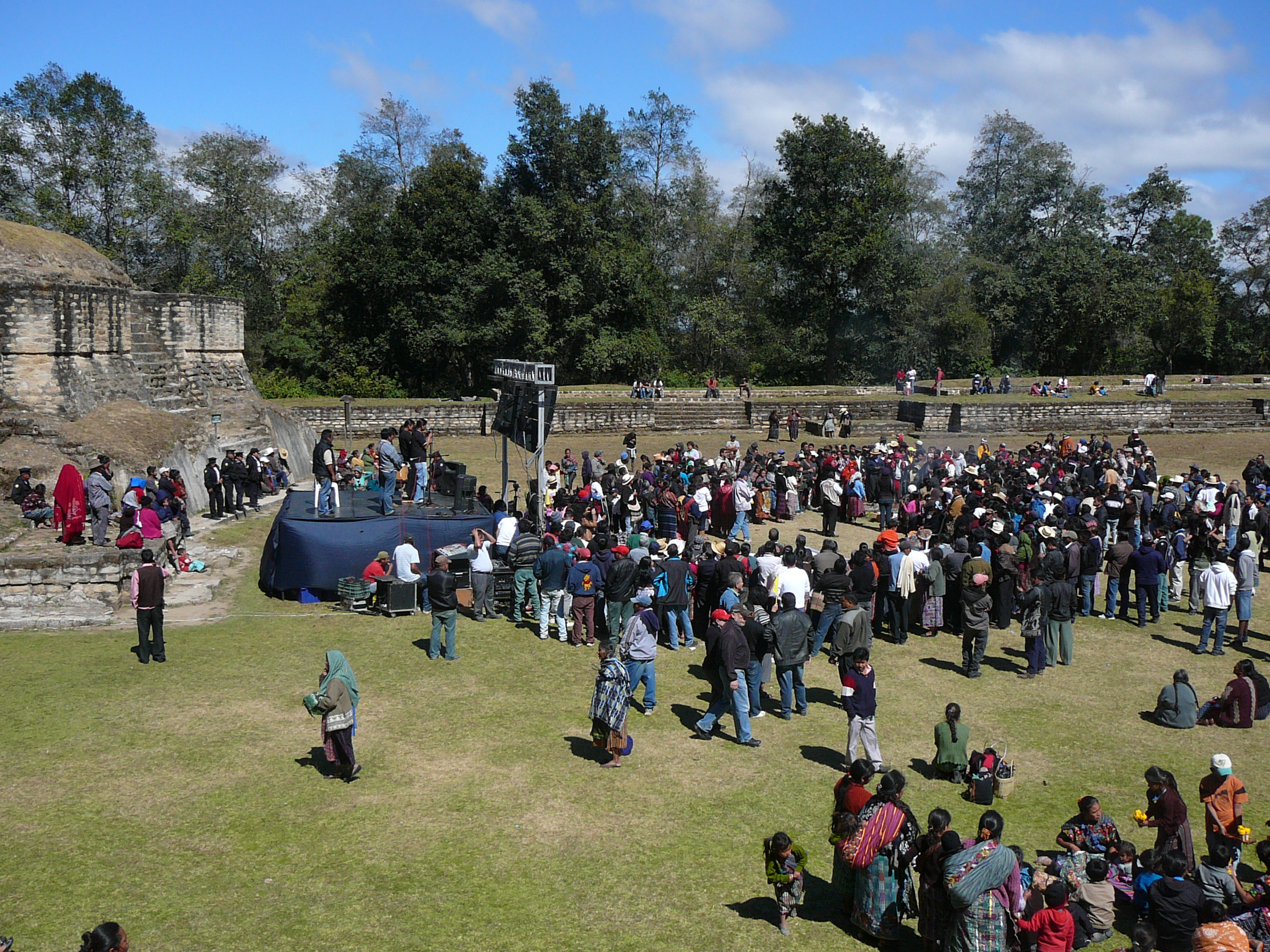
A Mayan fire ceremony and human rights rally held at Iximche on 21 December 2012, attended by locals and tourists alike.

The majority of visitors to Iximche are indigenous Maya, at the weekend the site attracts about 250 visitors per day. Comparatively few tourists visit the ruins and the majority that do are Guatemalan nationals. Modern aj qʼijab' (Maya priests often referred to as "daykeepers" in English) arrive as pilgrims at Iximche from throughout the Guatemalan Highlands.

Tourist facilities at the site include visitor parking, a small museum, a picnic area and a football field. The museum is open on a daily basis and displays a number of artefacts recovered from the ruins.

== Site description ==
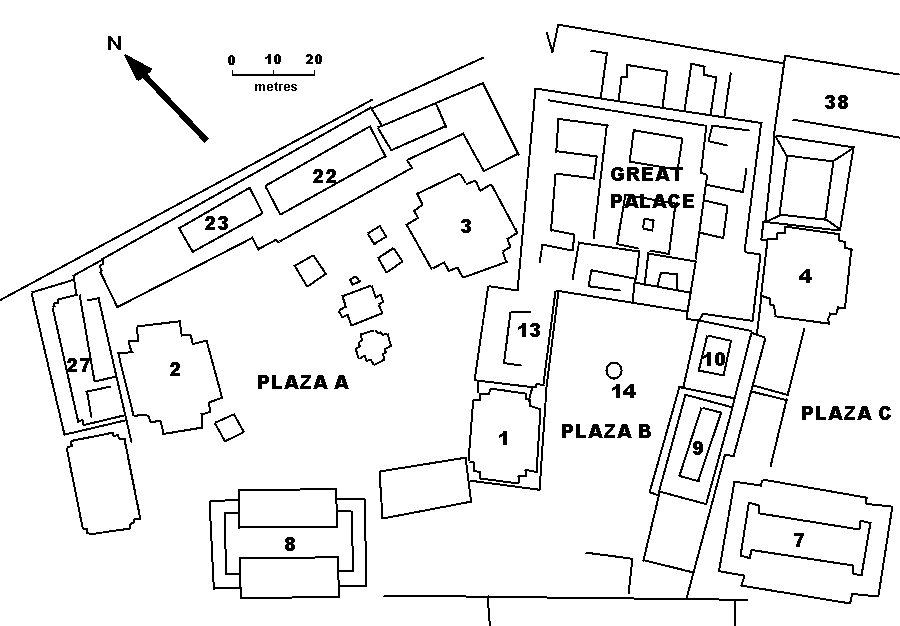
Map of the site core of Iximche, showing the principal structures of Plazas A to C

The site was largely preserved by the Spanish due to their alliance with the Kaqchikel against the Kʼicheʼ. The site's central core is flanked by deep ravines and is separated from the main residential area by a defensive ditch. The city developed very quickly and within 50 years of its foundation it had reached its maximum extent. This explosive population growth at the city caused the residential area to spill over into the edges of the ravines themselves. The site center consists of four large and two small plazas, each of which contained at least two temples. Along with elite palaces, there are two ballcourts, the larger of which is 40 metres (130 ft) long and had zoomorphic markers. The plazas are named A, B, C, D, E and F, running from northwest (A) to southeast (F). The ceremonial centre of the city was separated from the residential areas by a wall.

Today the ruins are accessed via the modern town of Tecpán Guatemala, which replaced Iximche when it was destroyed. The modern entrance to the site is on the northern side of the ruins and includes visitor parking, a small museum, a picnic area and a football field, as well as the custodian's house. In an area of woodland to the south of the central portion of the ruins is a modern ceremonial area used by the modern Kaqchikel to carry out their rituals. This ceremonial area is linked to the ruins by a footpath and includes six concrete altars arranged around an unexcavated building. Flowers, food and drink are placed on these altars as sacrifices. The museum displays a number of pieces from the site, including sculptures and ceramics.

Plazas A and B are thought to have comprised a single complex belonging to the Sotzʼil clan and included the palace of the Ahpo Sotzʼil. Plaza A possesses a ballcourt, two temples and ten palace structures, five of which are interconnecting.

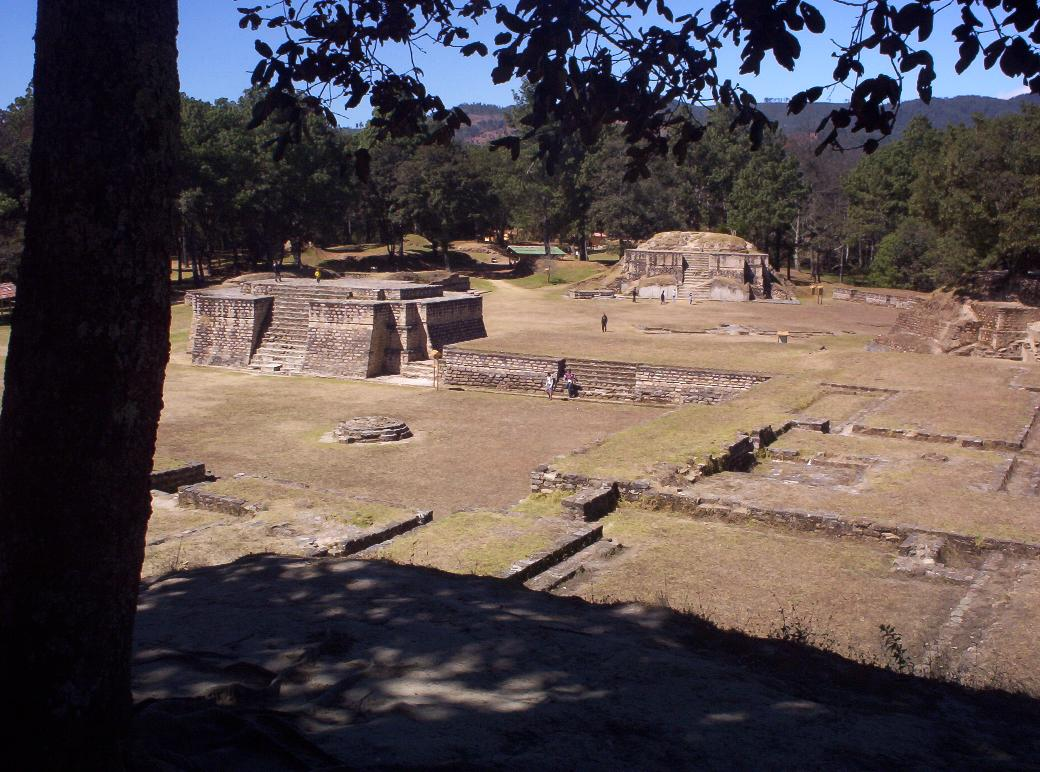
View of Iximche with Structure 1 at left and Structure 2 at right.

Plaza C was separated from Plazas A and B by a 0.91-metre (3 ft) wall and was the palace complex of the Ahpo Xahil, the junior co-ruler. Plaza C also had two temples facing each other across the plaza. The Xahil ballcourt was on the southwest side of Plaza C and the palace proper of the Ahpo Xahil was on the southeast side of the plaza. The Xahil Palace was built with an east–west alignment with the entry courtyard on the western side of the palace and had a central altar. The main palace was entered from the eastern side of the entry courtyard. The rooms and courtyards of the Xahil Palace contained a great deal of domestic artefacts. The Xahil Palace was destroyed by a major fire that resulted in the collapse of the adobe walls and it may be that this was the complex where Pedro de Alvarado was lodged with his Spanish soldiers. It would also be the same building that Spanish deserters burned in 1526. The collapse of the building preserved the domestic contents of the palace for archaeologists, unlike the palace of the Ahpo Sotzʼil where comparatively few artefacts were recovered.

Plaza D has not been excavated although it was cleared and mapped by archaeologists. It is a large plaza surrounded by fairly high mounds although it does not appear to have had the large east and west pyramids present on the other main plazas. It had a palace on the south side with three interior courtyards, the westernmost of which had a cross-shaped altar. The palace was smaller than those of the Ahpo Sotzʼil and the Ahpo Xahil and is believed to have been the palace of the Ahuchan.

Plazas E and F are to the east of Plaza D and also included palace buildings. These plazas were not mapped by Guillemín and remain covered by trees. The two plazas formed a single complex, believed to have been that of the Kʼalel Achi.

The defensive ditch running across the promontory was originally 8 metres (26 ft) deep. It was largely filled in soon after the Conquest in order to render the city less defensible. In the middle of the 19th century the defensive ditch was measured as 3 yards (2.7 m) deep, in the 1960s it was still visible on the ground although it is now almost totally filled in.

Ceramic finds at the site include frequent finds of incense-burners with handles and molded decoration. The most common domestic ceramics are of a micaceous ware and include ceramic comals (a type of griddle). Imported ceramics include Chinautla Polychrome and White-on-red, they are reasonably common at the site. Brown bowls are of a type also found in Zaculeu and Mixco Viejo, both of which also had a Late Postclassic occupation. Three-legged metates (a kind of mortar) were frequently recovered from the excavations and black obsidian blades were found in great quantities. Simple jade jewellery was also found.

Human sacrifice is evidenced at the site by the altar upon Structure 2, of a type used in heart sacrifice, and by a cylindrical cache of skulls taken from decapitated victims accompanied by obsidian knives. A pentatonic flute crafted from a child's femur was recovered from one of the temples and is also indicative of human sacrifice.

Because of the very brief nature of the Spanish occupation of the city, very few European artefacts were found. Those few pieces that were found consisted of forged iron crossbow bolts.

=== Structures ===
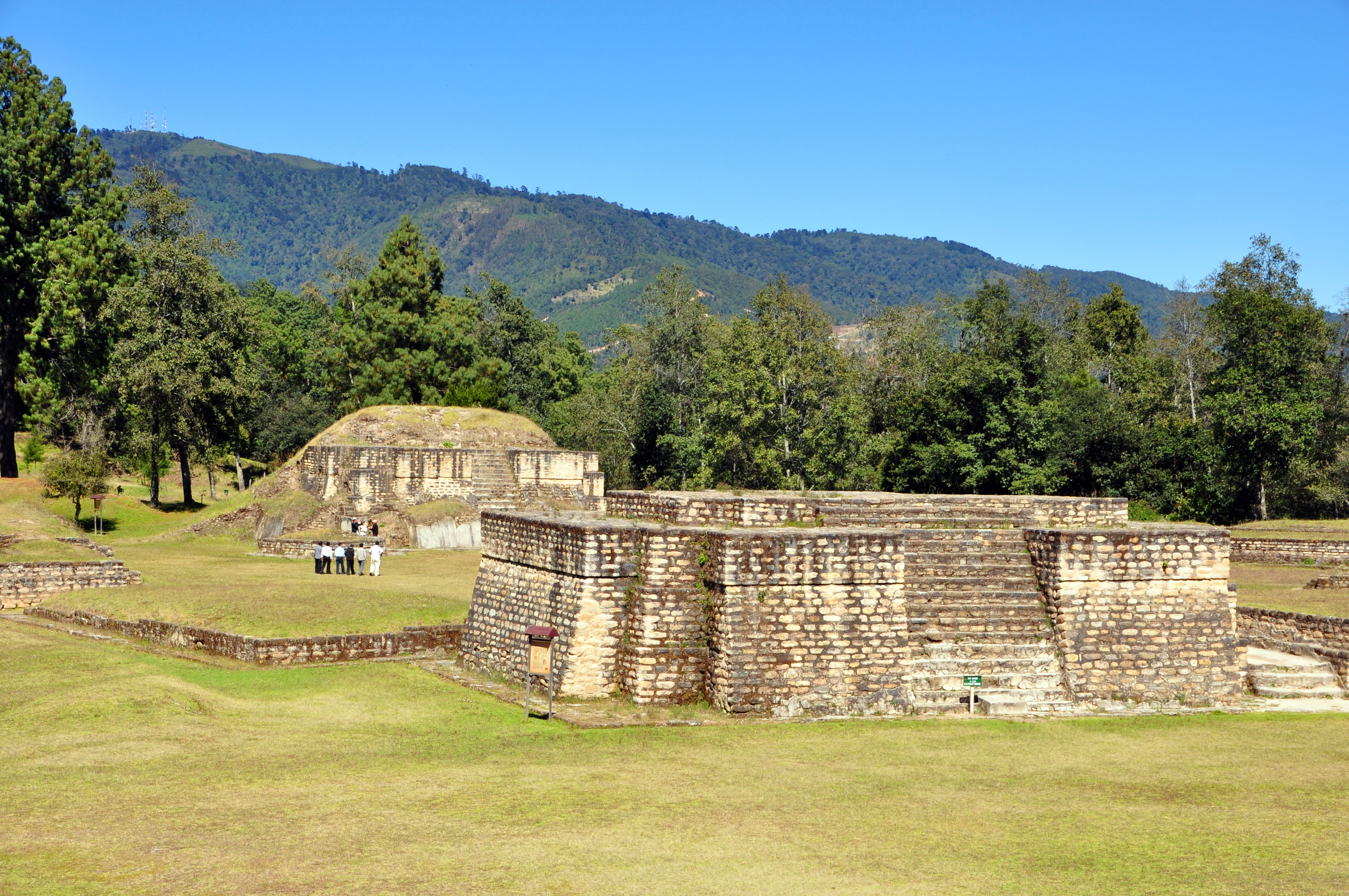
Temples 1 and 2 at Iximche

Over 160 structures have been mapped at Iximche. The structures were faced with stone blocks that were coated in lime plaster, which in some cases was then painted with Mixtec-Puebla style murals, although few traces of the murals survive today. The Mixtec-Puebla style originated around AD 900 in central Mexico and spread from there throughout Mesoamerica. The superstructures of buildings at Iximche were built from adobe blocks and once supported beam and mortar roofs but none have survived. The platform cores were generally built of rough stones set in a clay matrix. A few of the structures have been restored and the site core is kept clear of overgrowth. Residential structures built on platforms around the ceremonial plazas usually had built-in benches and hearths.

==== Great Palace I ====
The Great Palace I (or Gran Palacio I in Spanish) is a large residential complex on the northeast side of Plaza B. The surviving remains consist of a sunken patio and some low house platforms. Excavation revealed three construction phases, the earliest of which dates to the founding of the city by Wuqu-Batzʼ and Hun-Toh. This phase covered approximately 500 square metres (5,400 sq ft) and came to form the core of the palace. The first phase consisted of four long single-roomed residential range structures arranged around a courtyard, which possessed an altar in the middle. The residential units possessed inset benches against the walls and hearths in the middle of the floorspace. The walls were originally built of adobe covered with painted murals. Artifacts recovered from this phase included obsidian knives, comals, metates and domestic ceramics. Fragments of incense burners were recovered close to the altars in the palace. The Palace expanded in all directions around this early core with the addition of new buildings and courtyards. The early courtyard was later divided into several smaller patios. The last phase of construction at the Palace dates to the joint reign of Hun-Iqʼ and Lajuj Noj, by the end of which the palace covered an area of more than 3,000 square metres (32,000 sq ft).

On the southwest of the palace courtyard there were some low platforms, possibly ritual dance platforms, and on the southeast side was a building with benches against three of the walls and hearths at each end. This may have been the room where the Ahpo Sotzʼil held court and received visitors and tribute.

==== Great Palace II ====
The Great Palace II (or Gran Palacio II in Spanish) is another large residential complex, it is located on the southeast side of Plaza C. The palace is formed by a large number of small rooms arranged around seven interior courtyards. A large quantity of ceramic remains were recovered from within this palace. The rooms around the northeast courtyard within the Great Palace II may have been the royal apartments of this complex, owing to their position near the central courtyard while at the same time being closed off from it. The ceramics from this area were of exotic origin and elite nature. The royal apartments may also have included the rooms around the north courtyard of the palace.

==== Temple 2 ====
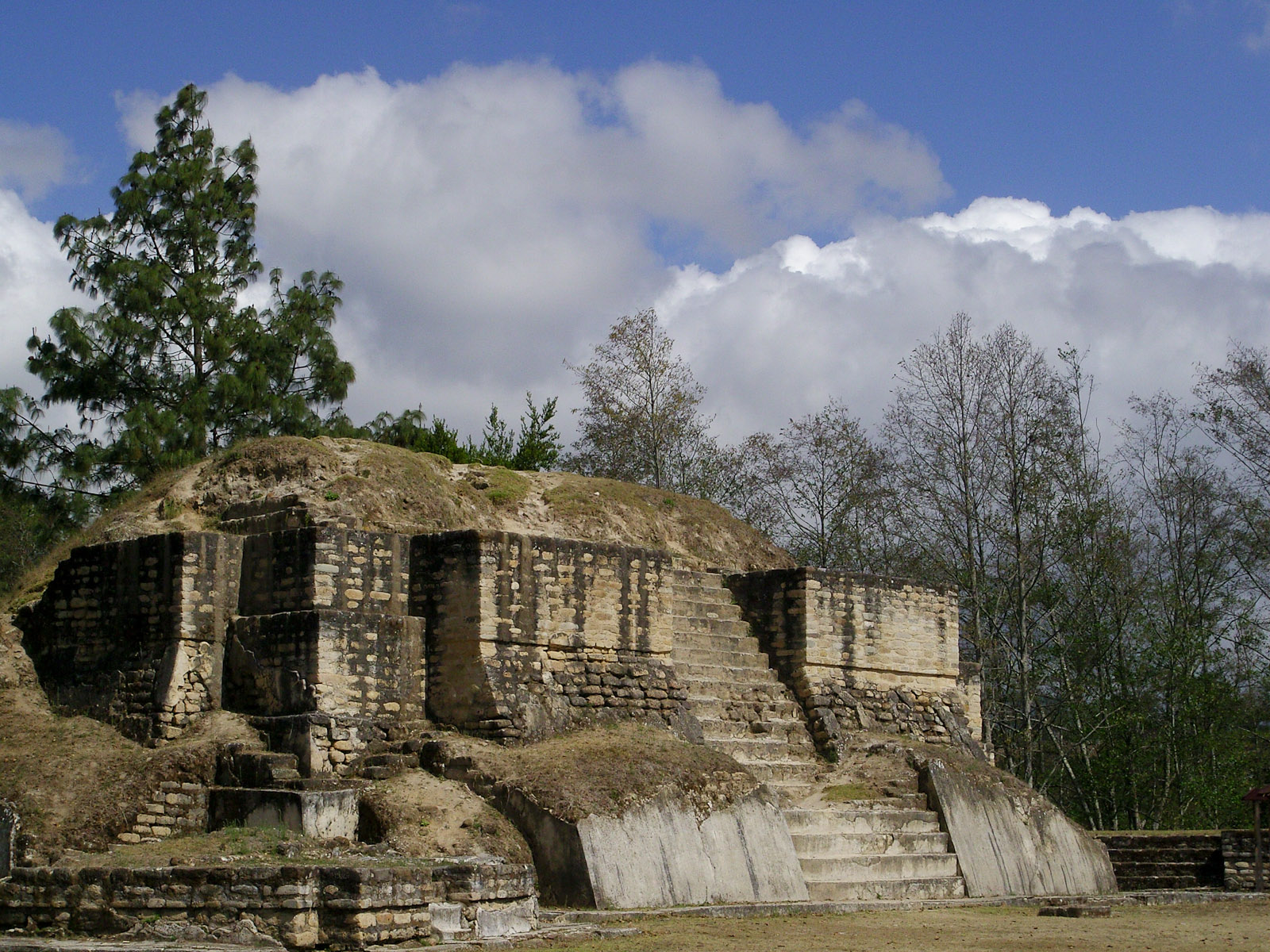
Temple 2 at Iximche and its itzompan ("skull place") at bottom left

Temple 2 (also known as Structure 2) is a tiered pyramidal platform on the west side of Plaza A. It has a stairway that climbs the east side of the structure, providing access from the plaza. Structure 2 faces the sunrise on the summer solstice. The structure is the best preserved of the excavated temples. Like many buildings at Iximche it had three construction phases dating, from oldest to newest, from the reigns of Wuqu-Batzʼ, Oxlahuh Tzʼiʼ and Hun-Iqʼ. The earliest of these phases was located by archaeologists tunnelling into the interior of the structure. It is poorly preserved because the facing stones were stripped in order to be reused. The middle phase is the best preserved of the three phases of construction and consisted of four stepped tiers supporting high talud-tablero style walls consisting of a sloping wall topped by a vertical panel. The temple had recessed corners and a steep stairway climbed to the topmost tier, at the top of the stair was a 40-centimetre-high (16 in) sacrificial altar measuring 45 centimetres (18 in) wide by 18 centimetres (7.1 in) deep. The altar was made from stone and stucco and the top was slightly concave, it is of a type used in human sacrifice.

The temple floor is elevated 9 metres (30 ft) above the plaza and the temple superstructure, including both the temple walls and the roof, would have added another 5 metres (16 ft) to the total height of the structure at the time of the Spanish Conquest. The temple shrine had benches built against three sides of the interior and a hearth in the middle. A small rear chamber also had benches, this chamber may have been where the gods of the Sotzʼil were kept. A small section of the temple floor had been opened as if to receive a burial but the tomb was never used and was covered over again. The remains of a turtle were excavated from the plaza immediately in front of the temple and may have represented one of the bacabs (a class of mythical being) that supported the temple. Turtles also played an important part in the Classic Period Maya myth of the rebirth of the Maize God.

The temple shrine was built on a final platform on top of the fourth tier. The exposed remains of the shrine date to the reign of Oxlahuh-Tzʼiʼ. It had a triple doorway divided by columns and was built from adobe covered with plaster, the columns and walls on eithers side of the doorways were painted with decorations, traces of red, yellow and blue were found by archaeologists, these colours were applied to designs marked out onto a thin cap of clay with a pointed instrument. The quality of the work was very fine and indicated execution by a specialised artist. There were ten painted figures on the front of the building with further murals on the back. The designs consist of two rows of discs on top of a row of vertical stripes with figures painted against the striped background with the discs above them. The painted figures are performing various actions, one of which is tongue piercing, and they probably represent a Kaqchikel ritual in progress. The painted murals are very poorly preserved due to deterioration caused by damp combined with damage caused by tree roots. The style of the paintings is very similar to that of Postclassic Mixtec art. Exposed parts of the middle phase of construction were damaged and the second phase was covered by the final construction phase, which was badly damaged by the stonework being stripped away for building the nearby town of Tecpán.

At the southwest corner of Temple 2 is a low platform that bore painted murals that had a skull with crossed longbones upon two bands of decoration. This platform may have been an itzompan or "skull place", a Kaqchikel version of the Aztec tzompantli skull racks. Two skulls bearing evidence of decapitation were found in a cache to the southeast of Temple 2 together with some obsidian blades.

==== Temple 3 ====
Temple 3 (also known as Structure 3) is a pyramid-temple located on the east side of Plaza A, opposite Temple 2, and is similar in form to that building. The stairway climbs the west (plaza) side of the temple platform. In front of the stairway, at the level of the plaza, is a small rectangular platform. A large amount of ceramic remains were found associated with this building, these were pieces of large cylindrical incense-burners, of which more than twelve were used in the temple. One represented an elderly god emerging from the jaws of a serpent, another two show the same deity in a standing position. They may represent one of the patron deities of the Kaqchikel, Bʼelehe-Toh or Hun-Tihax. The incense burners were found exactly where the Kaqchikels had left them when they abandoned Iximche. Some of these incense-burners bore a suspended solar disc with modelled rays. Fragments of an Early Postclassic plumbate ware vessel were recovered scattered around three sides of the temple that were probably the remains of a relic from within the temple itself. There is no evidence of such early occupation at Iximche and may have been plundered from Zaculeu, a city with a long occupational history that was conquered by the Kʼicheʼ-Kaqchikel alliance. A sacrificial flint knife was also recovered from Structure 3. Two low platforms stand in front of the temple, they were likely to have been used either as altars or as dance platforms.

==== Other structures ====
Structure 1 (also known as Temple 1) is a pyramid temple facing onto Plaza B. It is the only temple at Iximche to have been completely restored.

Structure 4 is another pyramid-temple base on the west side of Plaza C. It has a low platform at its southeastern corner, where 48 severed heads were excavated immediately to the west. Schele and Mathews have speculated that these may be the heads of the Kʼicheʼ kings Tepupul and Itzayul together with other members of the Kʼicheʼ court who were captured by the Kaqchikels and decapitated. Most of the skulls were found with associated obsidian blades. Most of the skulls had been individually buried in pits cut into the floor of the plaza, although a few were grouped into small lots.

Structure 5 was a pyramid-temple. Excavation revealed at least two phases of construction and the pyramidal platform had a single stair that divided into two as it approached the summit shrine.

Structure 6 is an unrestored temple-pyramid platform to the southwest of Plaza C.

Structure 7, at the southwest side of Plaza C, is a ballcourt of similar dimensions to Structure 8. It was the ballcourt of the Xahil clan and may have been the older of the two ballcourts. Each end of the ballcourt had a projecting stairway and there was an additional stairway to the southeast. A tenoned head sculpture recovered from Plaza C may originally have been a ballcourt marker from this ballcourt.

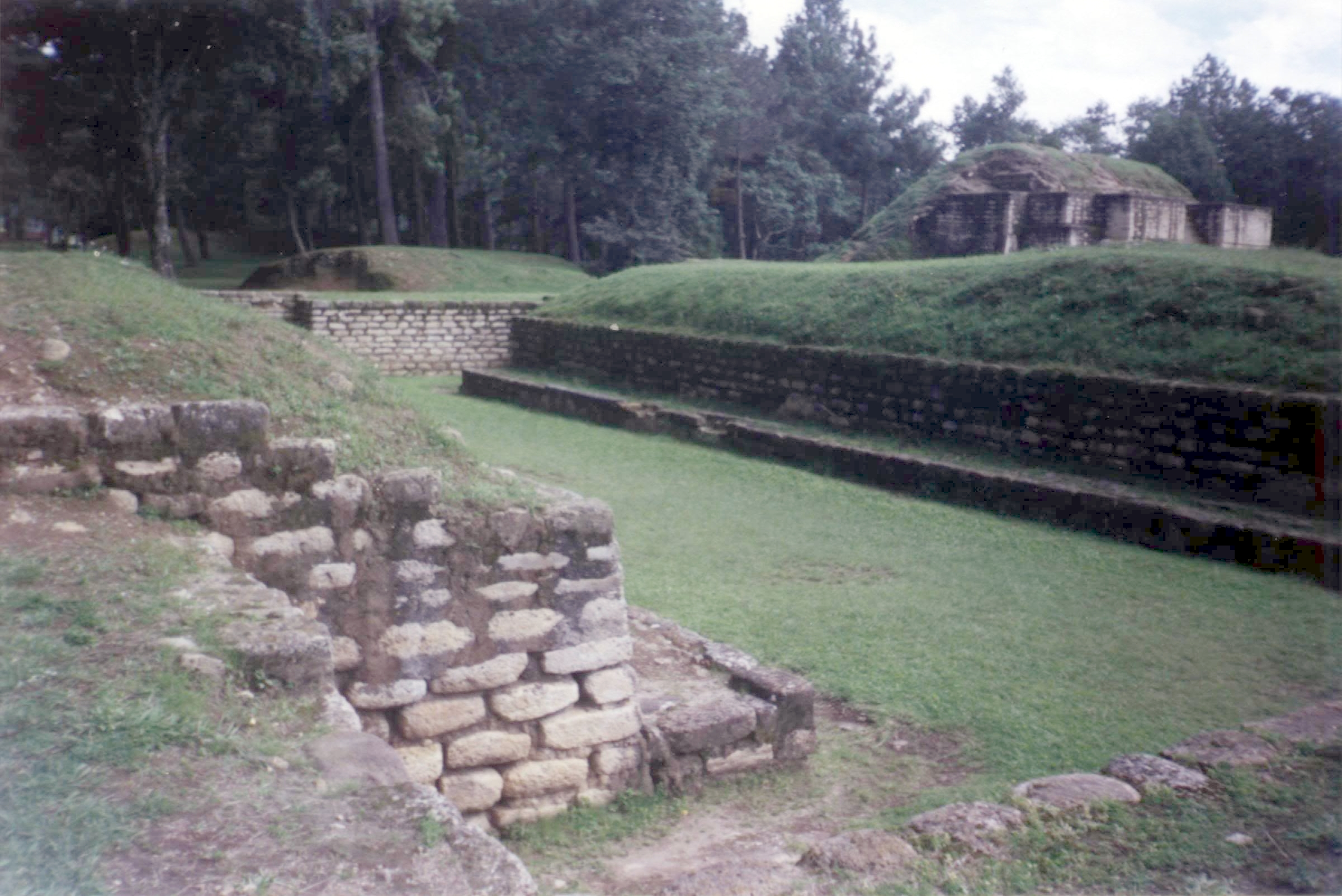
Structure 8, a sunken ballcourt on the southwestern side of Plaza A

Structure 8 is located at the southwestern side of Plaza A. It is a 40-metre-long (130 ft) I-shaped ball-court with a 30 by 7 metres (98 by 23 ft) playing area. The end-zones are enclosed and accessed via stairways. The two lateral platforms enclosing the playing area were extended by building onto the outermost side. In Kaqchikel ballcourts were called hom and were seen as gateways to Xibalba, the underworld. Structure 8 has been excavated and restored. Excavations uncovered two levels of plaster flooring, indicating that the ballcourt had been built during the second of the three main phases of construction at Iximche, dating it to about AD 1500.

Structure 9-sub had two pillars separating three doorways.

Structure 10 had an internal patio with the building surrounding it on three sides.

Structure 13, lying between Plazas A and B, had an internal patio with the structure enclosing it on three sides, much like Structure 10.

Structure 14 is a circular altar in Plaza B measuring 3.5 metres (11 ft) across. It is very similar to those used for so-called "gladiatorial sacrifice" by the Aztecs and it may have served this purpose. This hypothesis is supported by the presence of a noble burial interred with three companions.

Structure 22 is a range structure on the north side of Plaza A. The bases of pillars survive that once separated five doorways. Structure 22 is one of the best preserved palace platforms at Iximche and had benches set against the inside of three of the walls and hearths set into the floor.

Structure 24 - two crude tenoned zoomorphic heads, possibly jaguar heads, were found near this structure but were probably ballcourt markers from one of the two ballcourts. It is likely that they served as a core onto which stucco modelling was applied.

Structure 27 is located behind Temple 2. Within it was found the noble tomb E-27-A.

Structure 38 is a 61-metre (200 ft) long platform that completely enclosed the north side of Plaza C. It supported three residential structures, each of which had its own stairway. Domestic ceramics were found associated with these buildings. An incense burner was also found with an effigy of Tlaloc, the central Mexican rain god.

=== Human remains ===
The skeletal remains of more than 100 individuals have been excavated at Iximche, some of which were very well preserved. Unfortunately the bones became mixed when warehoused near the site after excavation and their original locations are no longer clear. Thirty-six skulls were analysed by archaeologists, of these 25 show evidence of decapitation, a sacrificial practice commonly represented in Maya art from the Classic Period. Thirteen of these sacrifices were male, seven were female and five were of indeterminate gender. Most of the sacrifices were of young adults, ten were aged between 15 and 21 years old and eleven were aged little more than 21 years old, based on skull development. It is likely that these sacrificed individuals were not Kaqchikels but were captives taken from enemy states. Less than 3% of the analysed skulls showed evidence of iron deficiency anemia, a very low percentage compared with remains recovered from Copán and Altar de Sacrificios (64% and 88% respectively). This low percentage indicates that these individuals were not exposed to particular dietary stress and were likely to belong to the elite class. 31% of the skulls had evidence of infection, about half of which were active infections at the time of death, although none were serious. Half of these infections left evidence in the maxillary sinus, this suggests a fairly high level of airborne pathogens in the environment. Tooth enamel analysis was carried out on 19 individuals and revealed hypoplasia in the teeth of 89% of these, indicating a high level of poor health in the first 7 years of childhood.

All excavated tombs were intrusive burials interred under residential platforms. They were all found in a squatting position without any particular orientation. Many of the remains were found accompanied by a broken obsidian blade. Some burials had other offerings, for example that of a woman accompanied by domestic utensils, some of which were blackened with soot. Two child burials each had a jade bead and the burial of an elderly male was accompanied by pieces of burnt pine and evergreen oak.

Burial E-27-A was a noble tomb in Structure 27, in Plaza A. The remains of three sacrificed adults were piled together face down in a 1 square metre (11 sq ft) space. Under these sacrifices were the seated remains of another person. This individual wore a gold headband with a jade and turquoise mosaic and a necklace with ten representations of jaguar heads together with forty small gold beads. On each arm he wore a bracelet fashioned from the occipital bone of a human skull and engraved with fine designs that included birds and stars hanging from a Mexican-style celestial band. A finely crafted piece of jade was found near the lower jaw and had probably been originally placed within the mouth of the deceased. There was also a copper nose ornament in the shape of the moon and some jade beads, one of which represented a deity similar to that represented on the incense burners found at Temple 3. The remains dated from the earlier phase of occupation of Iximche and the deceased had died in battle from a blow to the head from a blunt instrument. The burial has been tentatively identified as that of one of two sons of Wuqu-Batzʼ of the Xahil clan, who died in the Kaqchikel wars of expansion, either Chopena-Tzʼiʼkin Uka or Chopena-Tohin.

== See also ==
- Chajoma
- Chitinamit
