= Genaro García =

Genaro García may refer to:

- Genaro García (boxer)
- Genaro García (writer)
- Genaro García Luna, Mexican former government official and convicted drug trafficker
