= Annie Hunter =

Annie G. Hunter (1860 – 1927) was an English professional artist and illustrator, best known for her reproduction drawings of pre-Columbian Maya monuments and inscriptions. In the late 1890s Hunter was commissioned by the early Mayanist scholar Alfred Maudslay to provide drawings and watercoloured illustrations of Maya monuments. (She worked from casts, lintels and stelae in museum holdings, and photographs.) Her illustrations appeared in Maudlay's pioneering archaeological and iconographic survey Biologia Centrali-Americana: Archaeology (London: R.H. Porter and Dulau, 1889–1902).

Hunter's work provided an important basis for the study of Maya iconography and inscriptions in the early 20th century; her careful renderings provide scholars access to texts that otherwise would be difficult to study. Hunter's work for Maudslay gained her acclaim, and after World War I she was commissioned by the University of Pennsylvania Museum of Archaeology and Anthropology to provide watercolour and line-drawn illustrations of Maya ceramics artefacts held in a number of collections, for publication in portfolio.
