= Hun-Toh =

Mayan nobleman

- Ahpo Xahil of Iximche
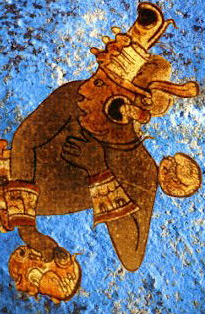
- A depiction of a Mayan warrior. Mayan kings often went to war. Behind the warrior is a Mayan blue background.
- Successor: Lahuh-Ah
- Spouse: unknown queen
- Issue: Lahuh-Ah
- Father: unknown
- Mother: unknown

Hun-Toh was the first Ahpo Xahil (sort of a king) of the Mayan city of Iximche.

== Biography ==
He and Wuqu-Batz' served the great K'iche' king K'iq'ab and he rewarded them with the royal titles and the power to rule. Wuqu-Batz' was an Ahpo Sotz'il. The sons of K'iq'ab became jealous of the growing power and led a revolt against their father that seriously damaged his authority.

After one incident, the K'iche' lords sentenced Hun-Toh and Wuqu-Batz' to death against the wishes of K'iq'ab, who warned his Kaqchikel friends and advised them to flee.

Hun-Toh and other lords went with their people out of the K'iche' capital to found their own capital at Iximche.

His successor was his son Lahuh-Ah.
