= Historia verdadera de la conquista de la Nueva España =

1568 book

The True History of the Conquest of New Spain
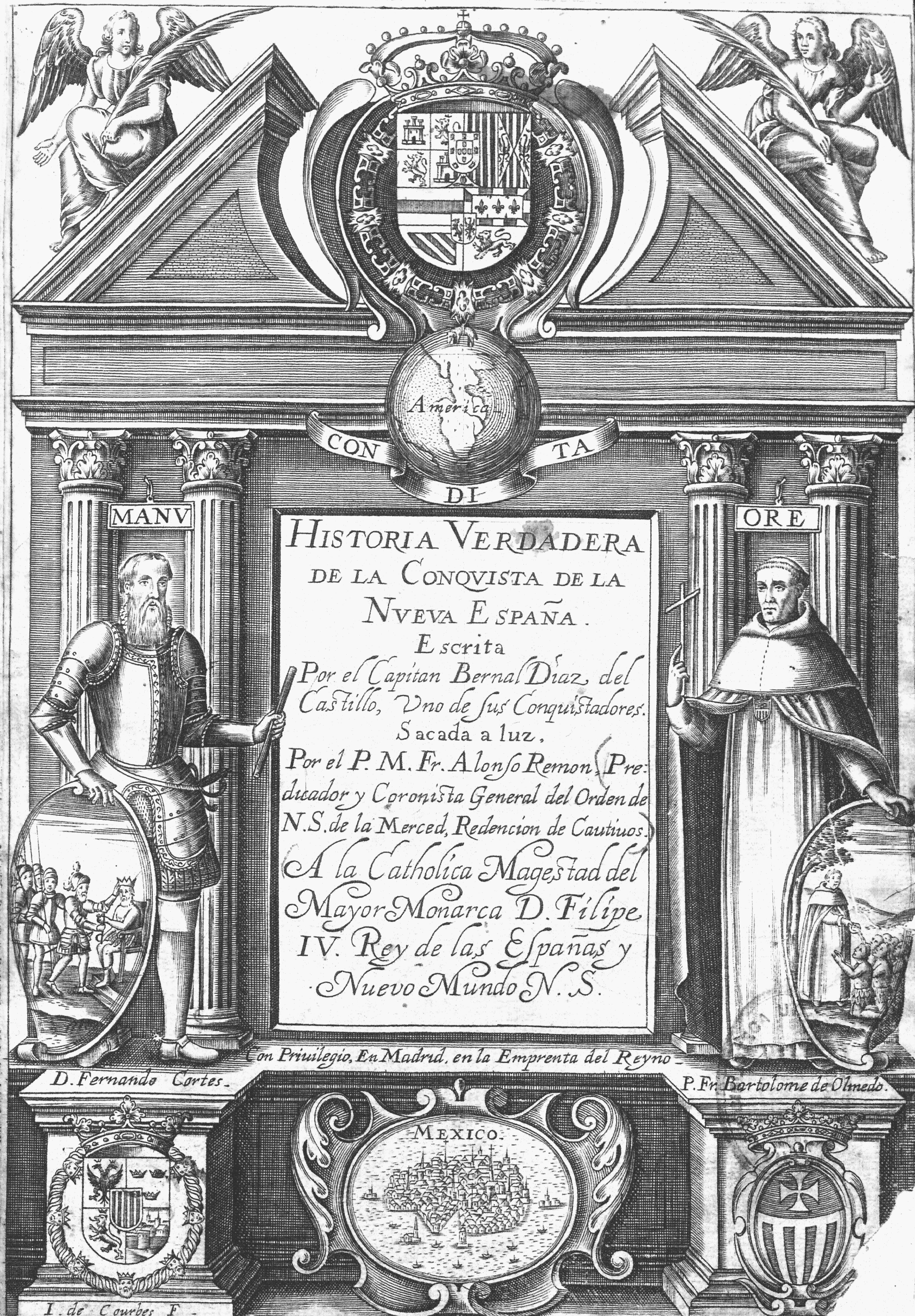
- The title page of a 1632 edition
- Author: Captain Bernal Diaz del Castillo
- Original title: Historia verdadera de la conquista de la Nueva España
- Language: Spanish
- Subject: Hernán Cortés; Spanish conquest of the Aztec Empire
- Published: 1800 (Printed for J. Wright, Piccadilly, by John Dean, High Street, Congleton); 1908 (The Hakluyt Society, London); 1963 (Penguin Books)
- Publication place: Spain
- Media type: Print
- Pages: 1760
- OCLC: 723180350

Historia verdadera de la conquista de la Nueva España (transl. The True History of the Conquest of New Spain) is a first-person narrative written in 1568 by military adventurer, conquistador, and colonist settler Bernal Díaz del Castillo (1492–1584).

Castillo served in three Mexican expeditions: those of Francisco Hernández de Córdoba (1517) to the Yucatán peninsula; the expedition of Juan de Grijalva (1518); and the expedition of Hernán Cortés (1519) in the Valley of Mexico. The history relates his participation in the conquest of the Aztec Empire.

== Contents ==
Late in life, when Díaz del Castillo was in his 60s, he finished his first-person account of the Spanish conquest of the West Indies and the Aztec Empire. He wrote The True History of the Conquest of New Spain to defend the story of the common-soldier conquistador of the Spanish conquest of the Aztec Empire. He presents his narrative as an alternative to the critical writings of Bartolomé de Las Casas, whose descriptions of Spanish treatment of native peoples emphasized the cruelty of the conquest.

He criticized the histories of the hagiographic biographers of Hernán Cortés, specifically that of Francisco López de Gómara, who Díaz del Castillo believed minimized the role of the 700 enlisted soldiers instrumental to conquering the Aztec Empire. In his eyewitness account, narrated in the first-person plural "we," Díaz del Castillo strongly defends the actions of the conquistadors while emphasizing their humanity and honesty. He summarizes their actions by saying, "We went there to serve God, and also to get rich."

The history is occasionally uncharitable about Cortés, whom Díaz del Castillo felt had taken most of the glory for himself while intentionally ignoring the efforts of the other Spaniards and their indigenous allies. Díaz del Castillo also criticizes some of Cortés’ decisions during the expedition as selfish or unjust, such as the torture and execution of Tlatoani (emperor) Cuauhtémoc.

Like other professional soldiers who participated in the conquest of New Spain, Díaz del Castillo found himself among the ruins of Tenochtitlán only slightly wealthier than when he arrived in Mexico. The land and gold compensation paid to many of the conquistadors proved a poor return for their investment of months of soldiering and fighting across Mexico and Central America. Díaz del Castillo expresses his discontentment and bitterness about his and the other soldiers’ treatment by the Spanish government.

Though Díaz del Castillo justifies his and the other Spaniards’ actions through the lens of a just war, he expresses some regret over the destruction of Tenochtitlán, writing, "When I beheld the scenes around me, I thought within myself, this was the garden of the world. All of the wonders I beheld that day, nothing now remains. All is overthrown and lost."

== Unabridged translations ==
- The True History of the Conquest of Mexico by Captain Bernal Diaz del Castillo, translated by Maurice Keatinge, London, 1800
- The Memoirs of the Conquistador Bernal Díaz del Castillo (1844), translated by John Ingram Lockhart (2 volumes, 213 chapters with notes)
- The True History of the Conquest of New Spain by Captain Bernal Díaz del Castillo, translated by Alfred Percival Maudslay. London, Hakluyt Society, 1908 (4 volumes, 17 parts, 214 chapters with appendices) from the only original copy published by Genaro García in Mexico with notes and appendices. Considered the most complete and authentic translation. An abridged version with deleted passages and 116 chapters was published in 1928 titled The Discovery and Conquest of Mexico 1517–1521
