= Alfred Maudslay =

British archaeologist

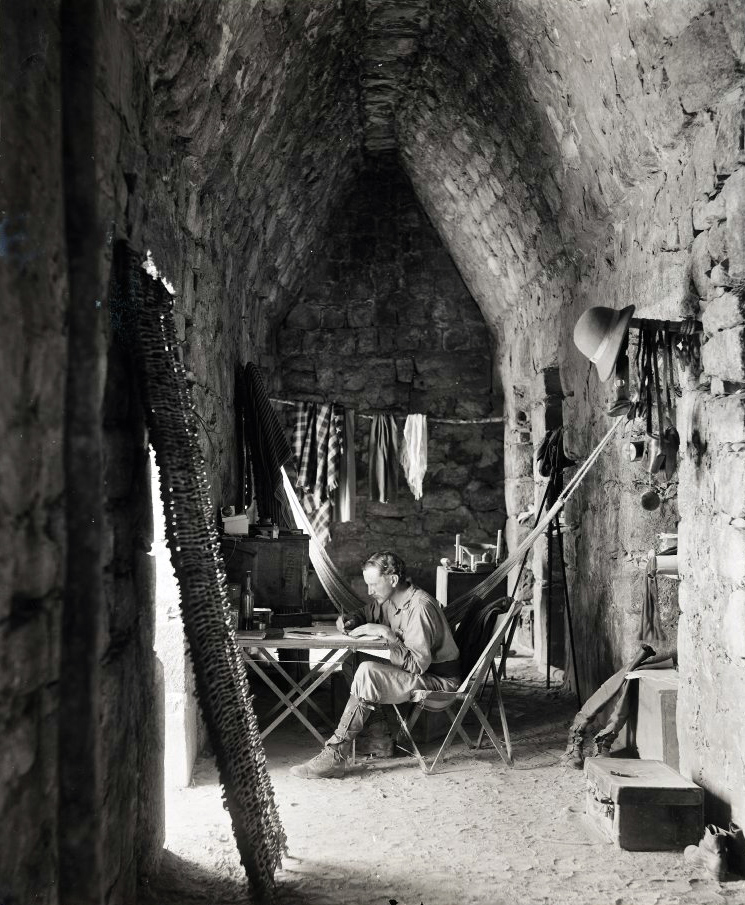
Alfred Percival Maudslay, interior of southern chamber, Casa de Monjas at Chichen Itza, 1889

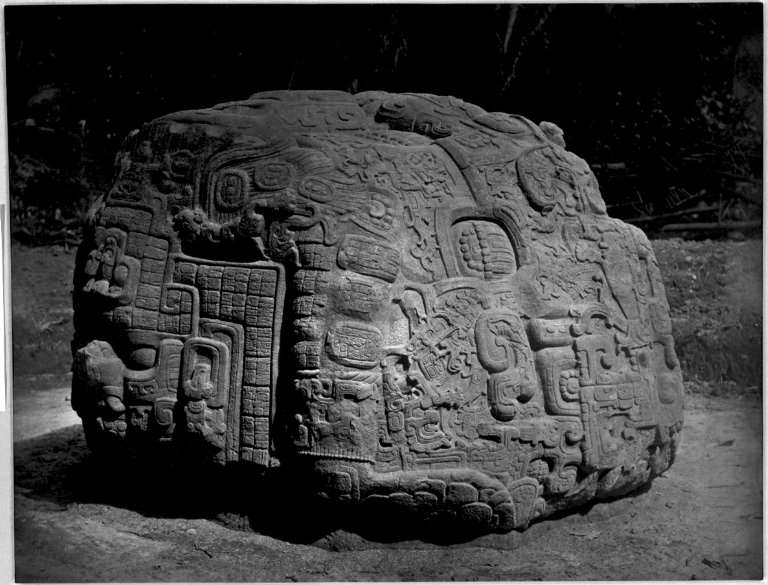
Quiriguá, 1883 Brooklyn Museum

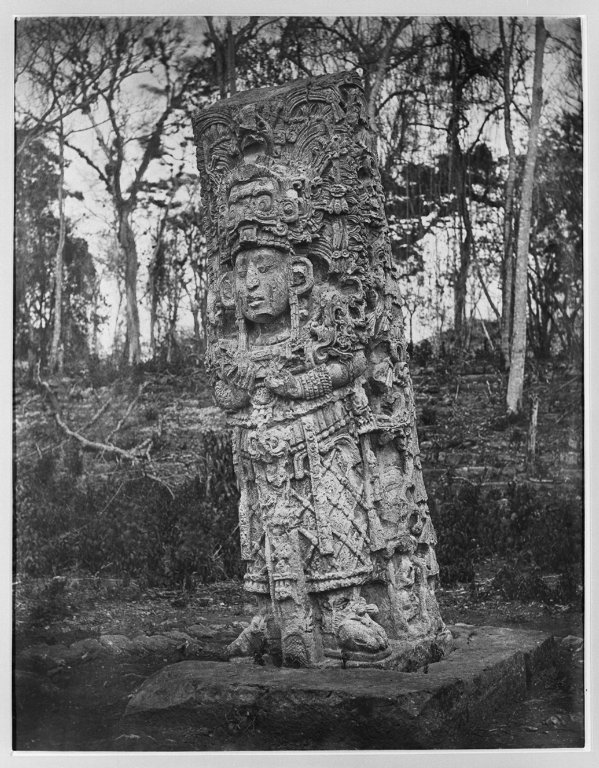
Copan. Stela H., 1885 Brooklyn Museum

Alfred Percival Maudslay (18 March 1850 – 22 January 1931) was a British colonial administrator and archaeologist. He pioneered the careful archaeological study of the Maya ruins and the results of his field work were presented in Biologia Centrali-Americana: Archaeology (1889–1902). The massive five volume set continues to serve as an important work of reference for the study of Maya culture. In 1908, he made a complete translation, with annotations, of Bernal Díaz del Castillo's Historia. His translation remains the standard English edition.

== Early life ==
Maudslay was born into a wealthy family at Lower Norwood Lodge, near London, on 18 March 1850. He was the eighth of nine children born to Joseph Maudslay and Anna Maria, née Johnson. His grandfather was the eminent engineer Henry Maudslay, founder of the family engineering firm. After attending Harrow School, Maudslay studied natural sciences at Trinity Hall, Cambridge, and obtained a BA in 1872.

While at Cambridge, Maudslay studied comparative anatomy with John Willis Clark who was also an archaeologist.They remained friends after graduation and Clark may have influenced Maudslay's future pursuit of the subject. Maudslay also became acquainted with Osbert Salvin, a well-known ornithologist.

Upon graduation, Maudslay enrolled in medical school, but deferred his studies and travelled with his brother instead. They toured Central America, Mexico and parts of the United States, including the recently established Yosemite Park. After returning home, Maudslay again postponed medical school and travelled to Iceland in 1873. Afterwards, his chronic bronchitis led him to drop plans for a medical career and leave England for a warmer climate.

== Colonial administration ==
In 1874, Maudslay travelled to Jamaica with the intention of establishing a tobacco plantation. An outbreak of yellow fever on the island forced him to change plans and head for Trinidad. On his way there he made the acquaintance of William Cairns, a colonial administrator who was assuming the governorship of Trinidad. Cairn convinced Maudslay to take a job as his personal secretary. A short time later, he transferred with Cairns to Queensland, Australia.

Maudslay found Cairns difficult to work for, and in 1875 he moved to Fiji to work with Arthur Gordon, its governor, and helped in the campaign against rebellious local tribes. Later he served as British consul in Tonga and Samoa.

While in the South Pacific, Maudsley became interested in the collection of ethnographic materials. Eventually, his donation of these materials to Cambridge contributed to the formation of the University Museum of Archaeology and Ethnology. Before he left the region, Maudsley was thinking seriously of pursuing an interest in archaeology. His Cambridge friend, ornithologist Osbert Salvi, encouraged him to explore the Maya ruins of Quiriguá and Copán.

In February 1880, Maudslay resigned from the colonial service to pursue his own interests, having spent six years in the British Pacific colonies. He then joined his siblings in Calcutta during their round-the-world trip, returned to Britain in December, and then set out for Guatemala via British Honduras.

== Archaeologist ==
In Guatemala, Maudslay began the major archaeological work for which he is best remembered. He started at the Maya ruins of Quirigua and Copan where, with the help of Frank Sarg, he hired labourers to help clear and survey the remaining structures and artefacts. Sarg also introduced Maudslay to the newly found ruins in Tikal and to reliable guide Gorgonio López. Maudslay was the first to describe the site of Yaxchilán. With Teobert Maler, Alfred Maudslay explored Chichén in the 1880s and both spent several weeks at the site and took extensive photographs. Maudslay published the first long-form description of Chichen Itza in his book, Biologia Centrali-Americana.

In the course of his surveys, Maudslay pioneered many of the later archaeological techniques. He hired Italian expert Lorenzo Giuntini and technicians to make plaster casts of the carvings, while Gorgonio López made casts of papier-mâché. Artist Annie Hunter drew impressions of the casts before they were shipped to museums in England and the United States. Maudslay also took numerous detailed photographs – dry plate photography was then a new technique – and made copies of the inscriptions.

All told, Maudslay made a total of six expeditions to Maya ruins. After 13 years of preparation, he published his findings in 1902 as a 5-volume compendium entitled Biologia Centrali-Americana: Archaeology. One volume of text describes the four volumes of photographs, site plans, and colour drawings of Maya ruins. At Maudslay's request, an interpretation of Maya calendar glyphs by Joseph Thompson Goodman was added as an appendix. The accuracy and attention to detail set a standard for future archaeological reports.

Maudslay also applied for permission to make a survey of Monte Albán in Oaxaca but when he finally received permission in 1902, he could no longer finance the work with his own money. The firm of Maudslay, Sons and Field had gone bankrupt and reduced Maudslay's income. He unsuccessfully applied for funding from the Carnegie Institution. The Maudslays moved to San Ángel near Mexico City for two years.

In 1905, Maudslay began to translate the memoirs of Bernal Díaz del Castillo, who had been a soldier in the troops of the conquistadors; he completed it in 1912. In 1907 the Maudslays moved permanently back to Britain. Maudslay become a President of the Royal Anthropological Institute 1911–12. He also chaired the 18th International Congress of Americanists in London in 1912.

== Personal life ==
In 1892, Maudslay married US-born Anne Cary Morris, a granddaughter of Gouverneur Morris. For their honeymoon, the couple sailed to Guatemala via New York and San Francisco. There the Maudslays worked for two weeks on behalf of the Peabody Museum of Harvard University. Their account was published in 1899 as A Glimpse at Guatemala. Annie Maudslay died in 1926. In 1928, Maudslay married widow Alice Purdon. In the following years he finished his memoirs, Life in the Pacific Fifty Years Ago.

Alfred Maudslay died on 22 January 1931 in Hereford, England. His cremated remains were interred in the crypt of Hereford Cathedral, next to his first wife. Materials he collected are currently stored at Harvard and the British Museum.

== Selected works ==
- Historia verdadera de la conquista de la Nueva España (The True History of the Conquest of New Spain) by Bernal Díaz del Castillo. London 1908 Hakluyt Society (4 Volumes, 214 chapters with Appendices) from the only original copy published by Genaro García in Mexico in 1904 with notes and appendices – considered the most complete and authentic translation Volume 1, Volumes 2, and 3, Volume 4, and Volume 5 abridged in 1928 as The Discovery and the Conquest of Mexico 1517-21
- Archaeology. 1850–1931. (followed by the Atlas edited by F. Ducane Godman and Osbert Salvin; or, Contributions to the knowledge of the fauna and flora of Mexico of Central America. (Reprint 1974)
- Biologia Centrali-Americana: Contributions to the Knowledge of the Fauna and Flora of Mexico and Central America (reprint), University of Oklahoma Press, 1983. ISBN 978-0-8061-9919-1.
- Anne Cary Morris Maudslay and Alfred Percival Maudslay, A Glimpse at Guatemala, and Some Notes on the Ancient Monuments of Central America, London, John Murray, 1899. (Reissued by Cambridge University Press, 2010. ISBN 978-1-108-01704-6)
- Life in the Pacific Fifty Years Ago, London: George Routledge & Sons, 1930.

== Bibliography ==
- Brunhouse, Robert L. (1975). Pursuit of the Ancient Maya: Some Archaeologists of Yesterday. Albuquerque: University of New Mexico Press. ISBN 978-0-8263-0363-9.
- Graham, Ian (2001). "Maudslay, Alfred Percival". In Carrasco, Davíd (ed.). The Oxford Encyclopedia of Mesoamerican Cultures: the civilizations of Mexico and Central America (Online ed.). Oxford: Oxford University Press. ISBN 978-0-19-510815-6.
- Graham, Ian (2002). Alfred Maudslay and the Maya. A Biography. London: British Museum Press. ISBN 978-0-7141-2561-9.
- Graham, Ian (2004). "Maudslay, Alfred Percival". The Oxford Dictionary of National Biography. Oxford Dictionary of National Biography (Online ed.). Oxford: Oxford University Press. doi:10.1093/ref:odnb/38757. ISBN 978-0-19-861412-8. (Subscription, Wikipedia Library access or UK public library membership required.)
- Joyce, T. A. (1932). "149. Alfred Percival Maudslay". Man. 32: 123–125. ISSN 0025-1496. JSTOR 2790974.
- Tozzer, Alfred M. (1931). "Alfred Percival Maudslay". American Anthropologist. 33 (3): 403–412. doi:10.1525/aa.1931.33.3.02a00060. ISSN 0002-7294. JSTOR 661524.
