= Genaro García (writer) =

Historian, scholar and collector in Mexico

Genaro García (Fresnillo, Zacatecas, August 17, 1867 - Mexico City, November 25, 1920) was a Mexican writer, teacher, and attorney. As a jurist, he fought for the rights of women, woman's suffrage, and abolition of dueling. As a historian and educator, he argued for the centering of Mexican history and culture.

== Biography ==
García was the son of Trinidad García, a politician, educator, and mine owner; and Luz Valdes. He spent the first decade of his life in Zacatecas, but was moved with his family to Mexico City in 1877 when his father went to serve as the Secretary of the Interior for Porfirio Díaz. Later he enrolled in the Escuela Nacional de Jurisprudencia, now the Faculty of Law at the National Autonomous University of Mexico. His thesis was entitled La desigualdad de la mujer ("Women's inequality"), which he dedicated to his parents. A later published version of the thesis, an argument for the rights of women, was dedicated to his future wife, Concepción Aguirre, with whom he fathered 12 children. He was a federal deputy between 1882 and 1889, during which time he established a press for the chamber of deputies

García served in many roles including as the director of the National Museum of Archaeology, History and Ethnography (now the National Museum of Anthropology (Mexico) as well as the National Preparatory School.

García collected over 20,000 books and over 100,000 manuscript leaves in his lifetime, most of which are part of the Genaro García Collection at the Nettie Lee Benson Latin American Collection. Among the significant works in his collection are a manuscript copy of Antonio López de Santa Anna's memoirs (published by García as part of his Colección de documentos inéditos o muy raros para la historia de México series); a manuscript and a number of early and first editions of works by Sor Juana Inés de la Cruz; the archives of Mexican political figures, military leaders, and scholars including Lucas Alamán, Ignacio Comonfort, and Valentín Gómez Farías; indigenous codices; documents by and about Maximilian I of Mexico; and a collection of rare and unique Mexican newspapers and periodicals.

As part of his series, Colección de documentos inéditos o muy raros para la historia de México, published between 1905 and 1911, García published and edited a number of important works including an edition of Santa Anna's previously-unpublished memoir; a new edition of Bernal Díaz del Castillo's The True History of the Conquest of New Spain; and a collection of documents related to Juan de Palafox y Mendoza.

== Selected works ==
Books

- Captain Bernal Díaz del Castillo's Historia verdadera de la conquista de la Nueva España (as editor) translated into English as The True History of the Conquest of New Spain by Alfred Percival Maudslay
- Colección de documentos inéditos o muy raros para la historia de México, published between 1905 y 1911
- Documentos históricos mexicanos (1910–1911)
- La desigualdad de la mujer, 1891
- Apuntes sobre la condición de la mujer, 1891

Articles

- «La condición jurídica de la mujer según Herbert Spencer», in Revista Mexicana de Legislación y Jurisprudencia, 1894.
