= Oxlahuh-Tzʼiʼ =

- Ahpo Sotzʼil of Iximche
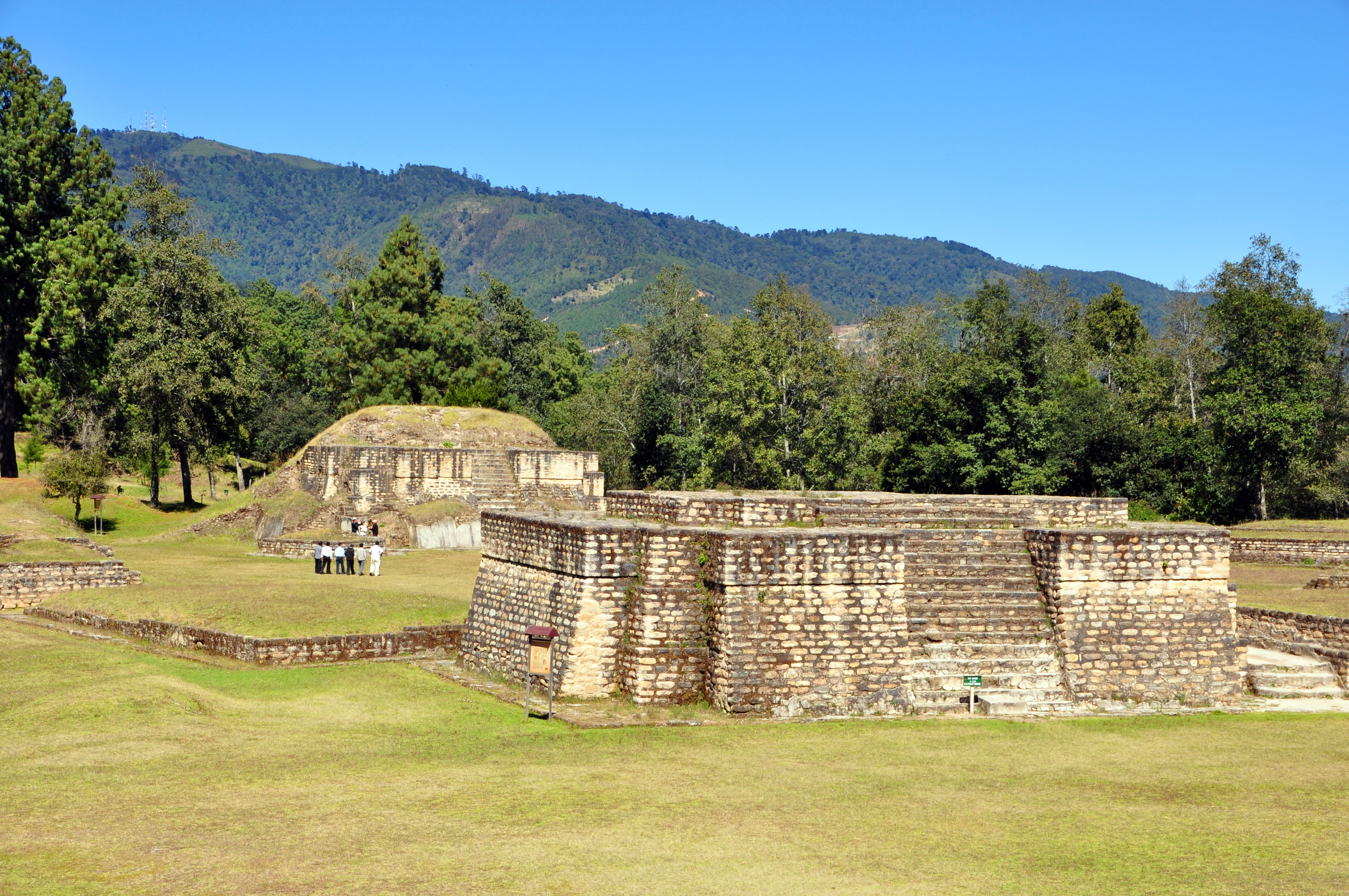
- Iximche, from where Oxlahuh-Tzʼiʼ ruled
- Predecessor: Wuqu-Batzʼ
- Successor: Hun-Iqʼ
- Spouse: unknown queen
- Issue: Hun-Iqʼ
- Father: Wuqu-Batzʼ
- Mother: Wife of Wuqu-Batzʼ

Oxlahuh-Tzʼiʼ (died 23 July 1508) was the second Ahpo Sotzʼil of Kaqchikel Maya city of Iximche.

== Biography ==
He was the son of his predecessor Wuqu-Batzʼ. He had a long and successful reign and lived through the reigns of two of his co-rulers - Lahuh-Ah and Kablahuh-Tihax.

=== Reign ===
Oxlahuh-Tzʼiʼ and Kablahuh-Tihax gained a victory over the Kʼicheʼ around 1491 when they captured the Kʼicheʼ kings Tepepul and Itzayul together with the idol of deity Tohil. The captured kings were sacrificed together with a number of nobles and high-ranking soldiers. After this defeat, two Kaqchikel clans rebelled. Oxlahuh-Tzʼiʼ and Kablahuh-Tihax crushed the rebellion on 20 May 1493.

=== Death ===
Oxlahuh-Tzʼiʼ died on 23 July 1508 and was succeeded by his son Hun-Iqʼ.

== Family tree ==
Wuqu-Batzʼ
Oxlahuh-Tzʼiʼ
Hun-Iqʼ
