= Wuqu-Batzʼ =

Ruler of Iximche, capital of the Late Postclassic Kaqchikel Maya kingdom

- Ahpo Sotzʼil of Iximche
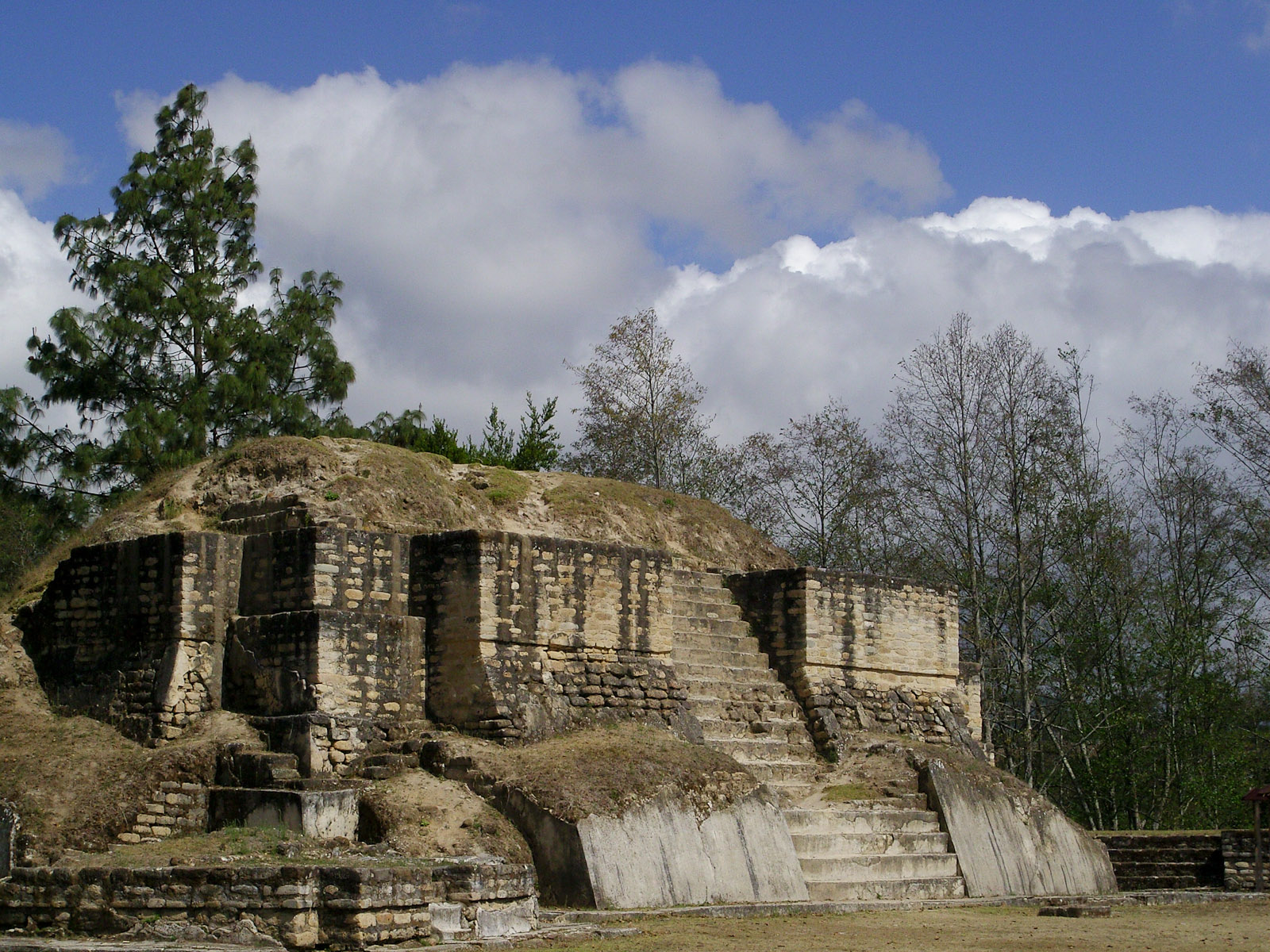
- Temple 2 had three construction phases dating, from oldest to newest, from the reigns of Wuqu-Batzʼ, Oxlahuh Tzʼiʼ and Hun-Iqʼ.
- Successor: Oxlahuh-Tzʼiʼ
- Spouse: unknown queen
- Issue: Oxlahuh-Tzʼiʼ
- Father: unknown
- Mother: unknown

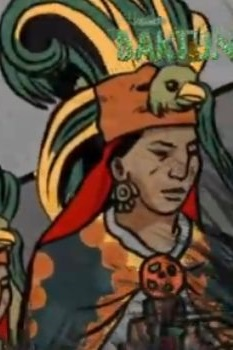
Wuqu-Batzʼ

Wuqu-Batzʼ was an Ahpo Sotzʼil (ruler) of Iximche, capital of the Late Postclassic Kaqchikel Maya kingdom.

== Biography ==
Hun-Toh and Wuqu-Batzʼ served the great Kʼicheʼ king Kʼiqʼab with such loyalty that he rewarded them with the royal titles Ahpo Sotzʼil and Ahpo Xahil and the power to rule. The sons of Kʼiqʼab became jealous and led a revolt against their father that seriously damaged his authority.

After one incident with a woman and the Kʼicheʼ soldier, the Kaqchikel demanded the execution of the soldier while the Kʼicheʼ nobility demanded the punishment of the bread seller. When the Kaqchikel lords refused to hand her over, the Kʼicheʼ lords sentenced Hun-Toh and Wuqu-Batzʼ to death against the wishes of Kʼiqʼab.

Kʼiqʼab warned his Kaqchikel friends and advised them to flee Qʼumarkaj. The four lords of the Kaqchikel - Wuqu-Batzʼ, Hun-Toh, Chuluk and Xitamel-Keh - led their people out of the Kʼicheʼ capital to found their own capital at Iximche. The exact year of this event is not known with certainty.

The successor of Wuqu-Batzʼ was his son Oxlahuh-Tzʼiʼ, father of Hun-Iqʼ.

== Bibliography ==
- Schele, Linda; Mathews, Peter (1999). The code of kings : the language of seven sacred Maya temples and tombs. New York: Simon & Schuster. ISBN 0-684-85209-8. OCLC 41423034.
