= Madre Vieja River =

River in Guatemala

- Location of mouth
- Native name: Río Madre Vieja (Spanish)

Location
- Country: Guatemala

Physical characteristics
- Source
  - location: Guatemala (El Quiché, Sololá, Chimaltenango, Suchitepéquez)
  - coordinates: 14°48′16″N 91°05′43″W
  - elevation: 2,400 m (7,900 ft)
- Mouth
  - location: Pacific Ocean
  - coordinates: 14°00′14″N 91°25′49″W
  - elevation: 0 m (0 ft)
- Length: 126 km (78 mi)
- Discharge
  - average: 8 m^{3}/s (280 cu ft/s) (at Palmira)

The Río Madre Vieja (Spanish pronunciation: [ˈmaðɾe ˈβjexa]) is a river in southwest Guatemala. Its sources are located in the Sierra Madre mountain range, on the border of the departments of El Quiché, Sololá, and Chimaltenango. It flows southwards through the coastal lowlands of Suchitepéquez and Escuintla to the Pacific Ocean.

The Madre Vieja river basin covers a territory of 1,007 square kilometres (389 mi^{2}).
