= Bernal Díaz del Castillo =

Spanish conquistador (c. 1492 – 1584)

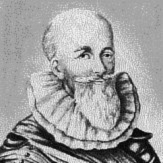
- A 1904 depiction of Díaz
- Born: c. 1492; Medina del Campo, Crown of Castile (modern-day Spain)
- Died: 1/2/3 January 1584 (aged c. 92); Antigua Guatemala, New Spain, Spanish Empire (modern-day Guatemala)
- Occupation: Conquistador
- Known for: Spanish conquest of the Aztec Empire

Bernal Díaz del Castillo (c. 1492 – 1/2/3 January 1584) was a Spanish conquistador who participated as a soldier in the conquest of the Aztec Empire under Hernán Cortés and late in his life wrote an account of the events. As an experienced soldier of fortune, he had already participated in expeditions to Tierra Firme, Cuba, and to Yucatán before joining Cortés.

In his later years, Castillo was an encomendero and governor in Guatemala where he wrote his memoirs called The True History of the Conquest of New Spain. He began his account of the conquest almost thirty years after the events and later revised and expanded it in response to Cortés' letters to the king, which Castillo viewed as Cortés taking most of the credit for himself, while minimizing the efforts and sacrifices of the other Spaniards and their Indigenous allies such as the Tlaxcaltecs during the expedition. Castillo disputed the biography published by Cortés' chaplain Francisco López de Gómara, which he considered to be largely inaccurate, in that it also excessively glorified Cortés at the expense of the other soldiers. Castillo also took issue with the historical account published by the monk Bernardino de Sahagún, which he found to be overly sympathetic to the Indigenous Americans, the Aztecs in particular.

Like many of the conquistadors who participated in the Spanish colonization of the Americas, Castillo was discontent that he did not achieve the great wealth he had hoped for and felt the Spanish government had failed to acknowledge his efforts and had cheated him. Having completed his memoirs, Castillo died in Guatemala at the age of 92. Though written decades after the events described, and containing numerous inaccuracies and biases, Castillo's memoirs remain one of only two first-hand accounts of the Spanish overthrow of the Aztecs and are thus considered a valuable historical artifact.

Attempting to explain the intentions and motivations of the Spaniards who arrived in Mexico, Castillo summarized it thus: "We came to serve God and to get rich, as all men wish to do."

== Biography ==
=== Early life ===
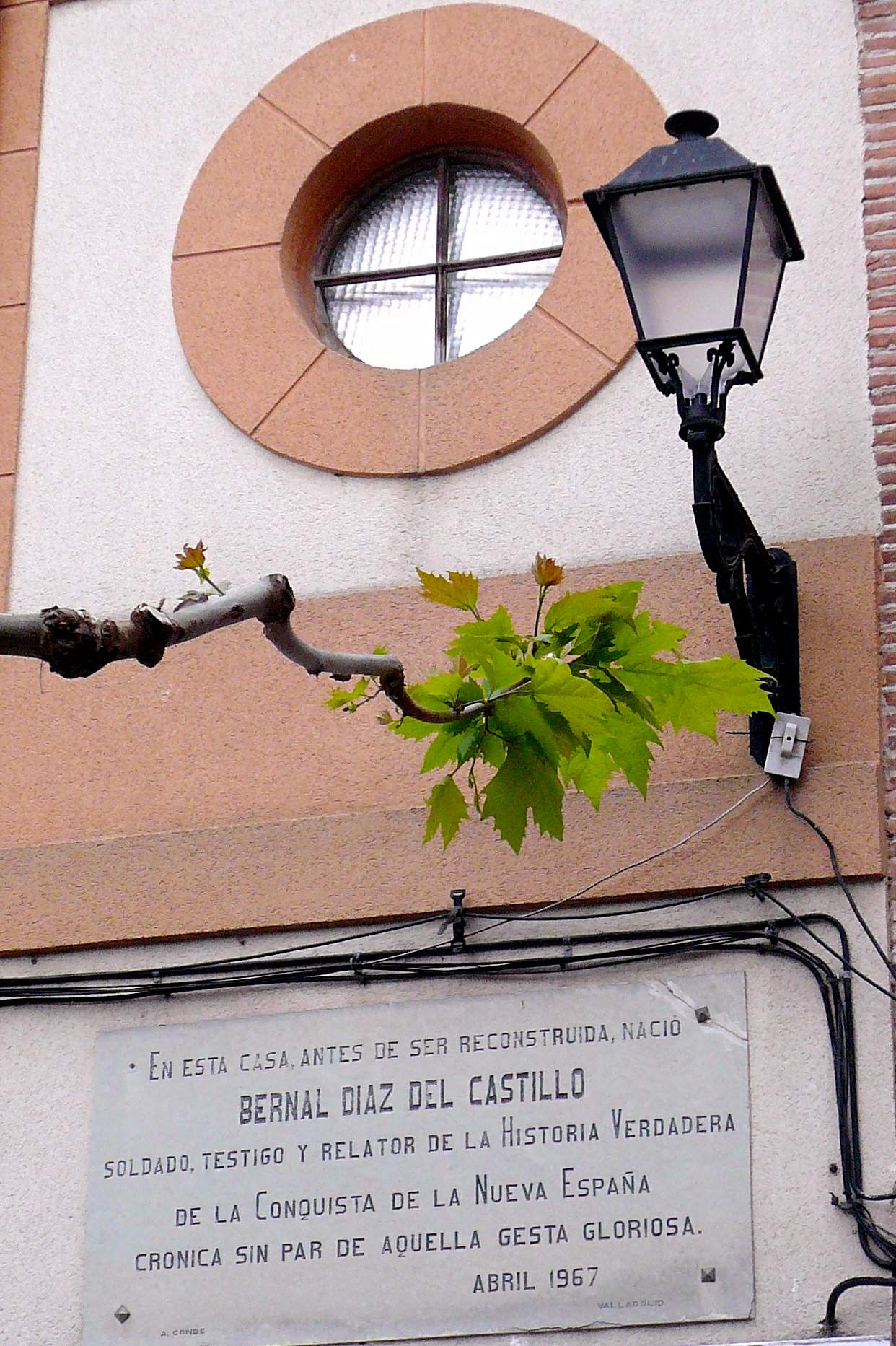
A memorial plaque to Bernal Díaz del Castillo in his hometown of Medina del Campo, Spain.

Bernal Díaz was born around 1492 in Medina del Campo, a prosperous commercial city in Castile. His parents were Francisco Díaz del Castillo and María Díez Rejón. His father was a regidor (city councilor) of Medina del Campo, which provided the family with some prominence. Díaz had at least one older brother. They attended school together, learning to read and write. Bernal Diaz was intelligent and later showed a knack for languages, learning to speak the Taíno language in Cuba, Nahuatl in Mexico, and the Cakchiquel language of the Guatemalan natives.

In 1514, when Díaz was about eighteen years old, he left home to join an expedition to the New World, led by Pedrarias Dávila. It was the largest fleet yet sent to mainland America, with 19 vessels and 1,500 persons. Díaz served as a common foot soldier and hoped to make his fortune. When they reached Darien in present-day Colombia, they were quickly overcome by famine and an epidemic that killed more than half of the settlers. Many of the colonists grew discouraged and looked elsewhere for new opportunities. Some returned to Spain while others sailed to Hispaniola or Cuba.

=== Expedition to Yucatán ===
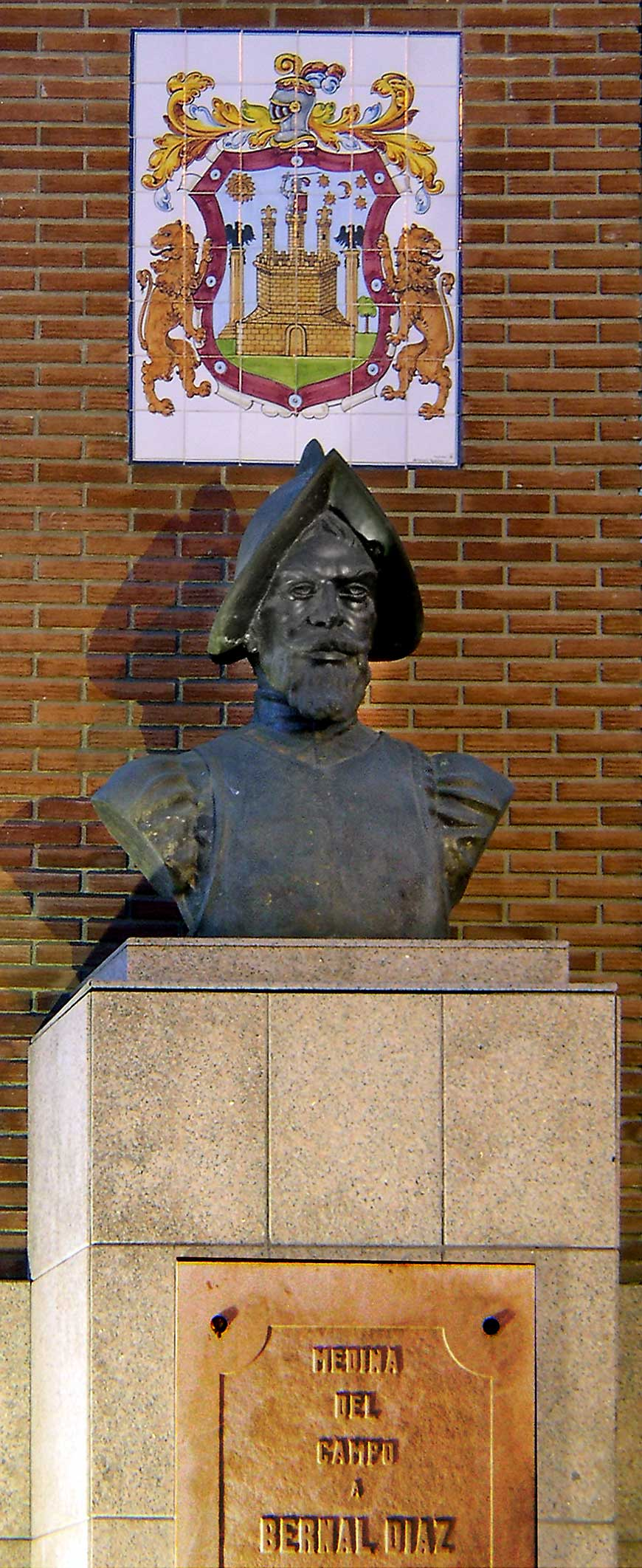
A memorial to Bernal Díaz del Castillo in Medina del Campo, Spain

In 1516, Diaz sailed to Cuba with about 100 other soldiers looking for a share of the gold and native laborers that were said to be found on the island. They discovered that gold was scarce and the native labor was in short supply, leading Díaz, in 1517, to join an expedition organized by a group of about 110 disaffected soldiers and settlers to "discover new lands". They chose Francisco Hernández de Córdoba, a wealthy landowner, to lead the expedition. It was a difficult venture and, after sailing from Cuba for 21 days, they came across the Yucatán coast in early March 1517, on the Cape Catoche.

On March 4, 1517, the Spanish had their first encounter with the Yucatán natives who came to meet them on five or perhaps 10 large wooden canoes, depending on the version/translation of his work. The next day, the Spaniards disembarked, invited by the natives who wanted to show them their village. They were ambushed. The Spanish managed to retreat, after killing 15 locals and having 15 of their own wounded, 2 of whom later died.

Upon leaving, the Spaniards captured 2 natives who would be translators in future expeditions. The Spanish almost died of thirst and sailed to Florida in search of potable drinking water. As they were digging a well on the beach, the Spaniards were attacked by locals. During this fracas, one Spaniard was captured by the native Floridians, while the Spanish killed 22 natives.

The Spanish managed to make a retreat but were unable to gather water. They returned to Cuba, all of them severely wounded. The captain, Francisco Hernández de Córdoba, and other soldiers died shortly after making it back to Cuba.

in April 1518, Díaz returned to the coast of Yucatán, in an expedition led by Juan de Grijalva, with the intent of exploring the lands. Upon returning to Cuba, he enlisted in a new expedition, this one led by Hernán Cortés.

=== Conquest of Mexico ===
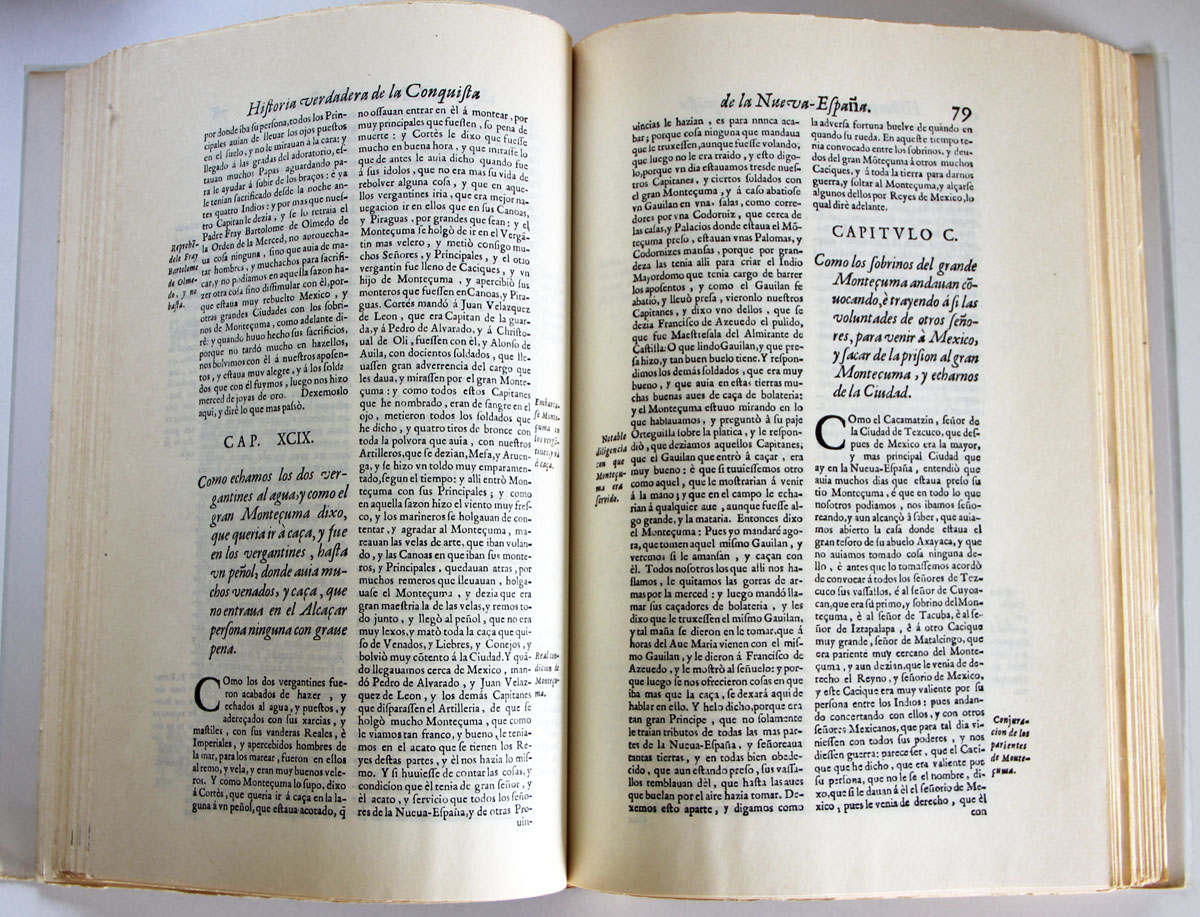
Pages from the 1632 edition of The True History of the Conquest of New Spain by Bernal Díaz del Castillo.

In this third effort, Díaz took part in the campaigns against the Mexica, later called the Aztec Empire. During this campaign, Díaz spoke frequently with his fellow soldiers about their experiences. These accounts, and especially Díaz's own experiences, served as the basis for the recollections that Díaz later told with great drama to visitors and, eventually, a book entitled Historia verdadera de la conquista de la Nueva España (English: The True History of the Conquest of New Spain). In the book, Díaz describes many of the 119 battles in which he participated, culminating in the defeat of the Aztecs in 1521.

This work describes the diverse native peoples living in the territory renamed New Spain by the Spaniards. Bernal Díaz examines the political rivalries of Spaniards, and gives accounts of the natives' human sacrifices, cannibalism and idolatry, which he claims he witnessed first-hand, and the artistic, cultural, political and intellectual achievements of the Aztecs, including their palaces, marketplaces and beautifully organized botanical and zoological gardens.

His account of the Mexica, along with that of Cortés, are first-person accounts recording important aspects of Mesoamerican culture. Similarly, the men's accounts provide extensive details about the actions of the Spaniards during their invasion of the Aztec Empire, creating controversy surrounding the aggression and force used by Cortés' army. Bernal Díaz's account has not yet been fully utilized as a source for conquest-era Mesoamerican culture.

=== Governor of Antigua Guatemala ===
As a reward for his service, Díaz was awarded an encomienda by Cortés in 1522. That was confirmed and supplemented by similar awards in 1527 and 1528. In 1541, he settled in Guatemala. In 1551, during a trip to Spain, was appointed regidor (governor) of Santiago de los Caballeros de Guatemala, present-day Antigua Guatemala, .

=== Last years ===
Bernal Díaz died between January 1 and January 3 1584. He was alive on January 1, but on January 3, his son, Francisco, appeared before the Cabildo of Guatemala and informed them that his father had died.

He may have had numerous children.

== Works ==
=== Historia verdadera de la conquista de la Nueva España ===
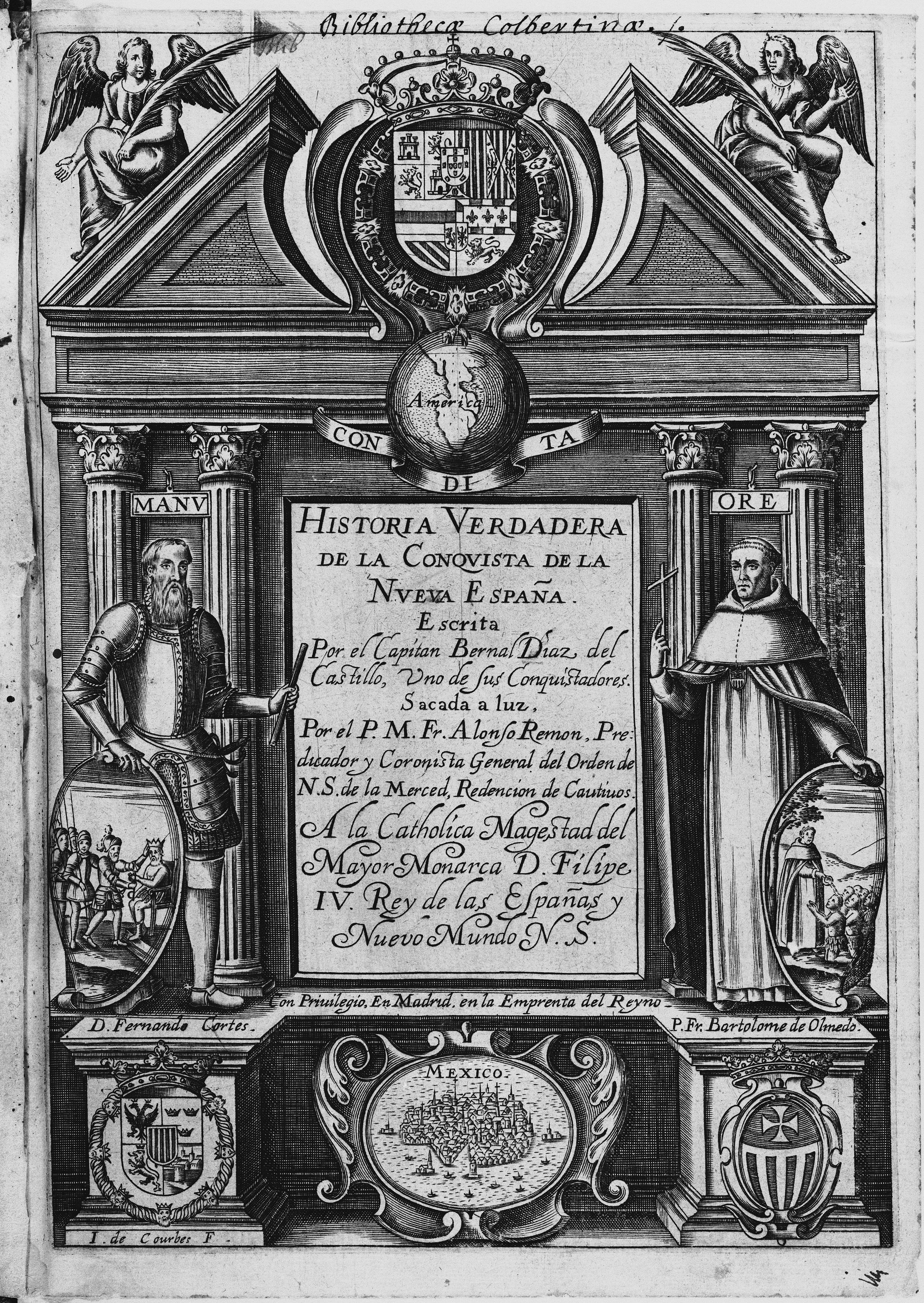
The title page of the 1632 edition of the Historia verdadera

Historia verdadera de la conquista de la Nueva España, finished in 1568, almost fifty years after the events it described. It was begun around the same time as his appointment as regidor and was well in progress by the mid-1550s when he wrote to the Holy Roman Emperor, and King of Spain, Charles V, describing his services and seeking benefits. That was a standard action of conquerors to document their services to the crown and requests for rewards. Bernal Díaz de Castillo sent his True History to Philip II of Spain in 1579, according to Juan Rodriguez Cabrillo de Medrano, son of the famous maritime explorer Juan Rodríguez Cabrillo.

Some version of his account circulated in Mexico in the 1560s and 1570s, prior to its seventeenth-century publication. Bernal Díaz's account is mentioned by Alonso de Zorita, a royal official who wrote an account of Indigenous society, and mestizo Diego Muñoz Camargo, who wrote a full-length account of the Tlaxcalans' participation in the conquest of the Mexica. Bernal Díaz's manuscript was expanded in response to what he later found in the official biography of Hernán Cortés commissioned by Cortés's heir, Don Martín Cortés, published in 1552 by Francisco López de Gómara.

The title Historia verdadera (True History) is in part a response to the claims made by Hernán Cortés in his published letters to the king, as well as to the claims of López de Gómara, Bartolomé de las Casas, Gonzalo de Illescas and others who had not participated in the campaign. Bernal Díaz also used the publication of Juan Ginés de Sepúlveda on just war, which allowed Bernal Díaz to cast the conquest of Mexico as a just conquest.

Despite this, Castillo was remorseful over the destruction of Tenochtitlan, writing in his History, "When I beheld the scenes around me, I thought within myself, this was the garden of the world. All of the wonders I beheld that day, nothing now remains. All is overthrown and lost."

An expanded and corrected copy of the manuscript kept in Guatemala was sent to Spain and published, with revisions, in 1632. The manuscript was edited by Fray Alonso de Remón and Fray Gabriel Adarzo y Santander prior to publication. In this first published edition of Bernal Díaz's work, there is a chapter (212), which some consider apocryphal because it contains signs and portents of the conquest, omitted from later editions.

Miguel León-Portilla wrote the Introduction to the anthology of extended excerpts from the Historia verdadera where he e.g. accepts Castillo's date of death (dated July 1984 "a cuatro siglos de la muerte de Bernal"). Alicia Mayer (2005) praised that edition, its selection, and León-Portilla's introduction, saying they remained, down to the date of her review, "fuente imprescindible de consulta" (an indispensable source to consult) without seeing his manuscript published.
