= Ferdinand I of Naples =

King of Naples from 1458 to 1494

Ferdinand I
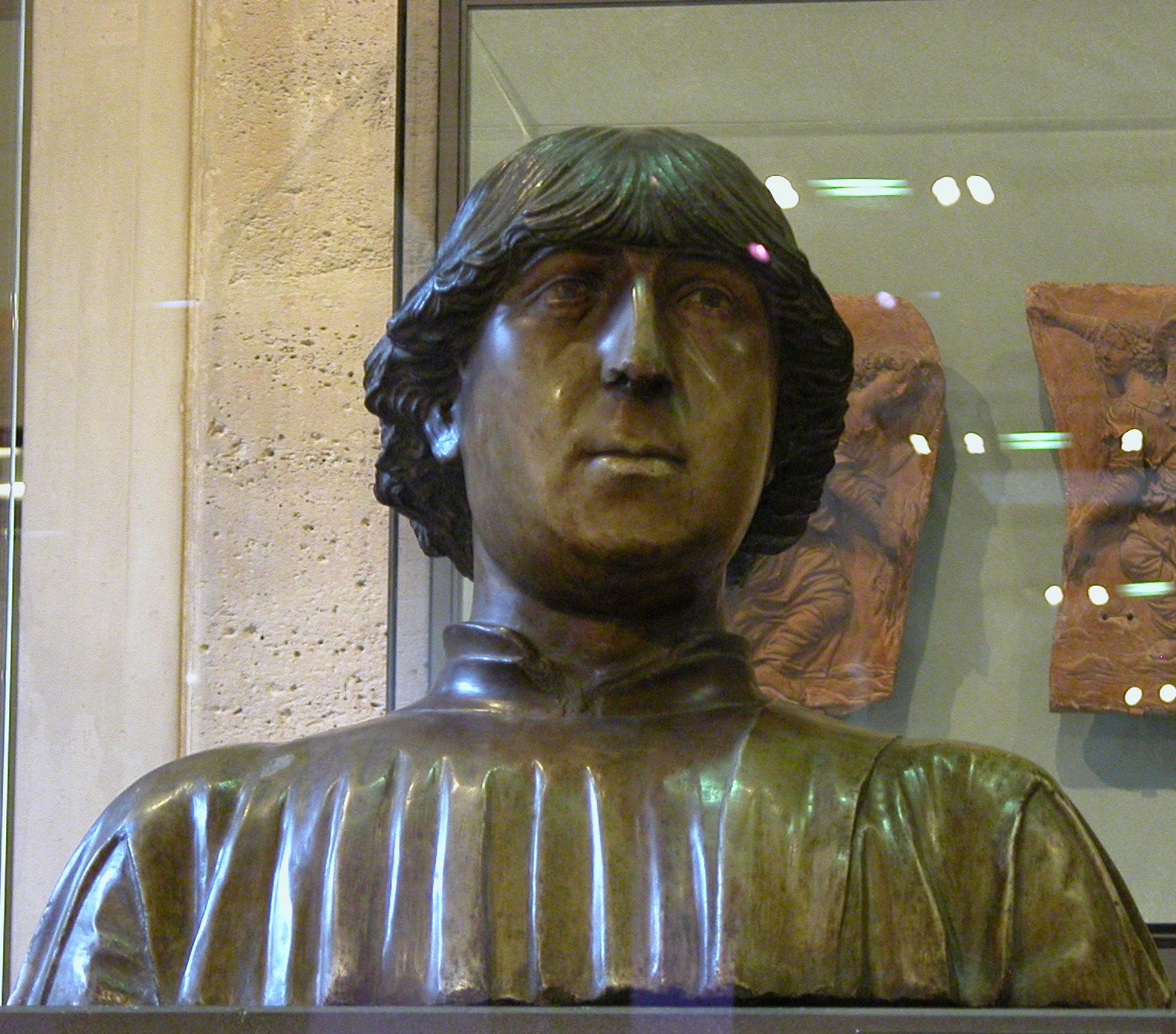
- Contemporary bust of Ferdinand

King of Naples
- Reign: 27 June 1458 – 25 January 1494
- Coronation: 4 February 1459; Barletta Cathedral, Apulia
- Predecessor: Alfonso I
- Successor: Alfonso II
- Born: 2 June 1423; Valencia, Crown of Aragon
- Died: 25 January 1494 (aged 70); Naples, Kingdom of Naples
- Burial: San Domenico Maggiore, Naples
- Spouse: Isabella of Clermont; Joanna of Aragon
- Issue among others...: Alfonso II, King of Naples; Eleanor, Duchess of Bari and Ferrara; Frederick, King of Naples; Cardinal John; Beatrice, Queen of Hungary and Bohemia; Joanna, Queen of Naples; Ferdinand, Duke of Montalto (ill.)
- House: Trastámara
- Father: Alfonso V of Aragon
- Mother: Giraldona Carlino

Ferdinand I (2 June 1423 – 25 January 1494), also known as Ferrante, was king of Naples from 1458 to 1494.

The only son, albeit illegitimate, of Alfonso the Magnanimous, he was one of the most influential and feared monarchs in Europe at the time and an important figure of the Italian Renaissance. In his thirty years of reign, he brought peace and prosperity to Naples. His foreign and diplomatic policy aimed at assuming the task of regulating the events of the peninsula in order not to disturb the political balance given by the Treaty of Lodi, to affirm the hegemony of the Kingdom of Naples over the other Italian states and to tighten through his diplomats and marriages of his numerous legitimate and natural children, a dense network of alliances and relationships with Italian and foreign sovereigns, earned him the fame and the nickname of "Judge of Italy", in addition to being recognized as a generous patron.

He issued various social laws that in fact undermined the excessive power of the Barons, favoring small artisans and peasants. This work of modernization and the resistance he put up against them led to the outbreak of the famous revolt, which was subsequently suffocated.

Ferrante was forced to prove his worth several times before obtaining the throne of Naples. Not only as governor, but also as a military man, as he was forced to recapture his own kingdom, against all conspirators, and during his rule, the kingdom was under constant attack from powers such as the Ottoman Empire, France, the Republic of Venice, and the Papal States. It can be said that, in general, almost his entire life was spent in war.

Ferrante was recognized for his courage and political skills, marking him as one of the most powerful political minds of the time. Completely Italianized, he surrounded himself with numerous artists and humanists, completed the paternal building works in the city of Naples, and erected new buildings that remain today.

The skills of Ferrante and his diplomats, skilled in weaving alliances in order to achieve Neapolitan hegemony in the system of Italian states, the fruits of the sovereign's economic strategy with the introduction of the art of silk and printing, politics of promotion and cultural attraction, the severe exercise of power through the repression of the conspiracy of the barons led the Kingdom of Naples, with intellectuals of the caliber of Pontano, Panormita, and others, to participate as a protagonist in Humanism and the Renaissance. At that time it possessed the most powerful navy in the western part of the Mediterranean.

== Biography ==
=== The paternal inheritance ===
==== Youth ====
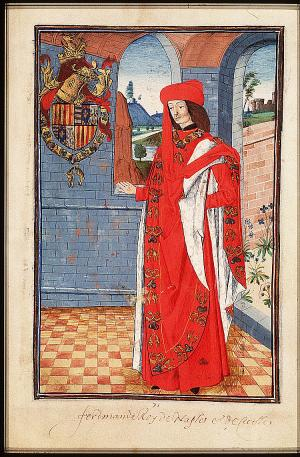
Ferrante d'Aragona, depicted as a member of the Order of the Golden Fleece

Ferdinand was born on 2 June 1424 in Valencia. His mother, Gueraldona Carlino, was probably a woman of Neapolitan origin who in December 1423 had accompanied Alfonso on his return to Spain, where she later married a certain Gaspar Reverdit of Barcelona.

In order to ensure a good future for his illegitimate son, his father Alfonso had called him to Naples. At the behest of the king, on 26 July 1438 the governor de Corella, the bishop Borgia, and the young Ferrante, with their entourage of young Catalan gentlemen, set sail from Barcelona for Italy. Alfonso's purpose was to prepare his only son, albeit illegitimate, for the role of heir to the kingdom he was conquering. The whole company landed in Gaeta on 19 August, where Ferrante was reunited with his father, whom he hardly knew.

A strong emotional bond soon developed between father and son, as Alfonso appreciated the young man's acute intelligence and courage, while Ferrante showed complete reverence for his parent. Alfonso, on 9 September 1438, created Ferrante a knight on the Maddaloni field where René of Anjou-Valois, challenged to battle, did not appear.

In Naples he had as teachers Valla, Panormita, Borgia, and Gabriele Altilio, who taught him for many years. He also had as tutor Paris de Puteo who taught him law. When the Sacro regio consiglio, judicial authority of the kingdom, was established by Alfonso, he was assigned the position of president.

Following the death of his uncle Peter, in April 1439 Ferrante was appointed lieutenant general of the kingdom. On February 17, 1440, King Alfonso, by his own authority, legitimized and declared his son his heir to the throne of Naples, and then, in January 1441, he secured the approval of the parliament of the barons of the kingdom that he had summoned in Benevento and which was then transferred to Naples. Still in parliament, Alfonso, worried about the succession, promoted a petition, in which the barons, knowing they were doing the king a great pleasure, proposed to establish Don Ferrante as his future successor, with the title of Duke of Calabria, usually given to the first-born of the king of Naples. Then Onorato Caetani, with the consent of all, kneeling before the king, begged him to create as Duke of Calabria and his future successor Don Ferrante, and the King with a cheerful face made him answer these words by the secretary:

The Most Serene Majesty of the King thanks you infinitely Distinguished, Respectable and Magnificent Barons for the petition made in favor of the Illustrious Lord Don Ferrante, his dearest son, and to satisfy your request he entitled him from this moment, and declares him Duke of Calabria, immediate heir and successor of this Kingdom, be happy and swear homage to him from the present day

— Bastian Biancardi, "Le vite de Re di Napoli, Raccolte succintamente con ogni accuratezza"

After this, Don Ferrante Duke of Calabria and successor of the kingdom was shouted with great joy and, on March 3, 1443, the king, accompanied by his son and baronage, went to the Monastery of the Nuns of San Ligoro, where the mass was celebrated with public solemnity and where Alfonso gave the sword in Ferrante's right hand, the flag in his left hand, and placing the ducal circle over his head, ordered everyone to call him Duke of Calabria.

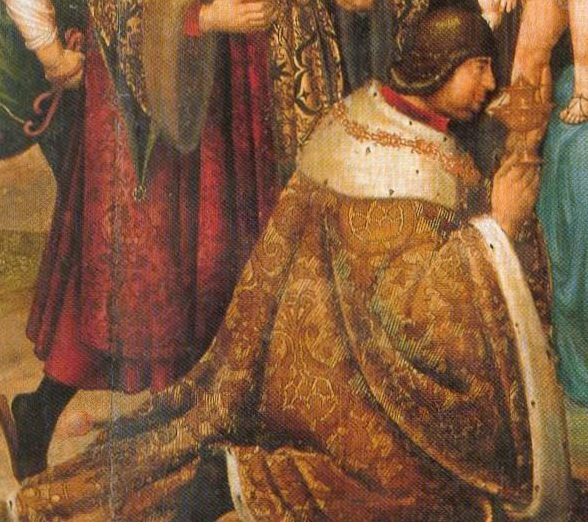
Don Ferrante of Naples depicted as one of the Magi in the Adoration of the Magi by Marco Cardisco, Civic Museum of Castel Nuovo, Naples

The recognition of the rights of succession Ferrante was sealed by the Papal bull Regnans in altissimis issued by Pope Eugene IV in July 1443, and later confirmed in 1451 by Pope Nicholas V. Ferrante in 1444 married the heiress Isabella of Taranto, daughter of Tristan of Clermont and Catherine of Taranto, designated heir of Prince Giovanni Antonio Orsini Del Balzo of Taranto, his maternal uncle, who had no children. Isabella was also the niece of Queen Mary of Enghien who, having married Ladislaus I of Anjou, had therefore been queen of Naples, Sicily and the Kingdom of Jerusalem from 1406 to 1414.

=== War with Florence ===
In June 1452, King Alfonso declared war on Florence, at the request of the Republic of Venice, to divert Florence from helping Francesco Sforza, Duke of Milan. Alfonso sent Ferrante with 6,000 cavalry and 20,000 infantry. Alfonso arranged with Venice to attack Florence while Venice attacked Milan.

Ferrante led this army through Abruzzo and was lovingly received throughout the kingdom. In Tuscany, the Duke's army encamped at the Abbey of San Galgano. Then the Florentines (whose governor was Cosimo de' Medici) raised the flags of King Charles VII of France, and urged that former king René reconquer Naples.

At this time there was an outbreak of disease in the Neapolitan army; Duke Federico of Urbino and many other captains fell ill. Ferrante moved the army to Pitigliano.

On 1 September Ferrante was informed that Foiano had already been taken. When winter came, the war in Tuscany ended. Alfonso negotiated peace and signed a league with Venice and Siena. On 9 April 1454, Venice and Milan signed the Peace of Lodi.

Ferrante returned to Naples via Abruzzo. When he reached the borders of the Kingdom, he discharged the Duke of Urbino and the other captains.

On 28 August 1454 he entered Naples, where he was received under a baldachin with joy by all the citizens.

On 15 February 1455, Cardinal Domenico Capranica came to Naples on behalf of Pope Nicholas V, to ask Alfonso to join the Italic League, an alliance of the major princes and potentates of Italy. Alfonso agreed, and thus established friendship with Milan and Florence as well as Venice and the Papacy.

=== The arduous Coronation ===
As established by his father, Ferrante succeeded him on the throne of Naples in 1458, at the age of 35. When he came to power, he had to face many problems: Charles, Prince of Viana, incited the Neapolitans to acclaim him king, the barons pushed King John of the Crown of Aragon to conquer the kingdom, and after the latter's refusal, they resorted to John of Anjou, son of René, who claimed the kingdom of Naples. The Pope demanded, moreover, that the kingdom be devolved to his Holy See. Ferrante had to overcome all these powerful enemies to keep the kingdom strong.

==== Charles of Viana the "claimant" ====
Charles, Prince of Viana, the son of King John II of Aragon, claimed that the illegitimate status of Ferrante precluded his ascension to king. While in Naples, through numerous Catalan and Sicilian barons, he conspired to gain the crown, but both the Neapolitan people and many barons, remembering the oath and promises made to Alfonso and to Ferrante, who had not only been legitimized by his father, but also declared legitimate successor by the Holy See, proclaimed: "Long live Re Ferrante our legitimate King" as Ferrante then rode through the city. When the Prince of Viana saw this display, he boarded a ship in Naples, abandoning his supporters, and fled to Sicily, with the Catalan barons who had not had fiefs in the kingdom from Alfonso.

==== The Apparent Coronation ====
Although he had overcome this obstacle, Ferrante still did not feel safe, since he did not yet have Callixtus III on his side, even though he had been his teacher and friend of his father before becoming Pope. The following day he sent ambassadors to the Pope to confirm the investiture of the kingdom, through the following letter.

Holy Father. In these days in the greatest turbulence and strength of strong pain, I have written to Your Holiness, giving you news of the death of the glorious memory of the King my Father. Now turned a little in me, leaving aside the tears, I advise Your Holiness that the day before he passed from this life, my Father ordered me that before anything else I should prefer the grace and esteem of Your Holiness. and his Mother Church, claiming that those who opposed and opposed would always be harmed. I cannot forget that since my childhood Your Holiness has been given to me as if by Heaven to guide me and so by the provision and commandment of the Father, and by the will of God I was handed over to Your Holiness and I want to be his until death. Therefore, I very humbly pray to Your Holiness that, by corresponding to this love, you accept me for your son, indeed confirm me in your grace, so that from this moment your Beatitude desires neither more obedience nor more inclined devotion from me. From Naples on 1 July

— Bastian Biancardi, "Le vite de Re di Napoli, Raccolte succintamente con ogni accuratezza"

After having sent the ambassadors to Rome, Ferrante wanted to anticipate the investiture. After leaving Castel Nuovo he went to the cathedral of the city on horseback, accompanied by the barons of the kingdom, where he was received with applause by Cardinal Rinaldo Piscicello, Archbishop of the city, who, accompanied by the clergy, met with him in front of the church choir and immediately after they went to the stairs of the high altar, where kneeling, the Te Deum was sung. The cardinal blessed the new sovereign with a pontifical blessing and proclaimed him King of Naples. After the coronation the trumpets began to sound, while the people shouted: "Long live the King Ferrante". He then rode, accompanied with great magnificence by the baronage and the people towards the seven offices of the Kingdom, then returned to Castel Nuovo. Finding it closed, according to the rite he then called the castellan Arnaldo Sanz, and said to him: "Open", and he replied: "Are you King Don Ferrante thirsty, son of the happy memory of King Don Alfonso?" The King replied: "I am that." The Castellano then asked the barons if the new king was Don Alfonso's son and they all said yes. The Castellano then, in front of all the people, handed the keys of the castle to Ferrante, who returned them to him and ordered to keep the fortress well. After this, the people continued to shout: "Long live the King Don Ferrando".

==== Clash with Callisto ====
Pope Callixtus III however, was ill-disposed towards Ferrante; in a papal bull of 12 July, he declared the throne of Naples vacant, not recognizing the succession of Ferrante, because he was the son of a Moorish servant and therefore neither the legitimate nor natural son of Alfonso V of Aragon. In fact, Calixtus aimed to usurp the crown from Ferrante, and grant it to his own nephew, Pedro Luis de Borja, newly installed as Duke of Spoleto. Calixtus had notices posted in various places in the kingdom, where it was reported that upon Alfonso's death, the Kingdom of Naples had devolved to the Papal state. Calixtus offered amnesty to all those who had sworn loyalty to Ferrante, but he ordered all the clergy, barons, cities and peoples of the kingdom, under pain of excommunication, not to obey Ferrante or continue to swear loyalty to him.

Ferrante then called the barons and the people to the General Parliament, who swore loyalty to him, without any rancor. To oppose Pope's plan, in the presence of the nuncio, he wrote a response to the papal bull, stating that he was legitimate king by the grace of God, for the benefit of his father King Alfonso, by acclamation of the barons and cities of the Kingdom and thanks to the concessions of the two previous Popes: Eugene IV and Nicholas V. Ferrante, in this war against Callixtus was able to count on an alliance with the Duke of Milan, not only due the kinship between the two dynasties, but also a bond that existed between them. The pope, always implacable and obstinate, refused any intercession from other rulers; so much so that Ferrante decided to send ambassadors to the Pope in the name of the kingdom. The latter found the pope sick and therefore were never admitted to his audience.

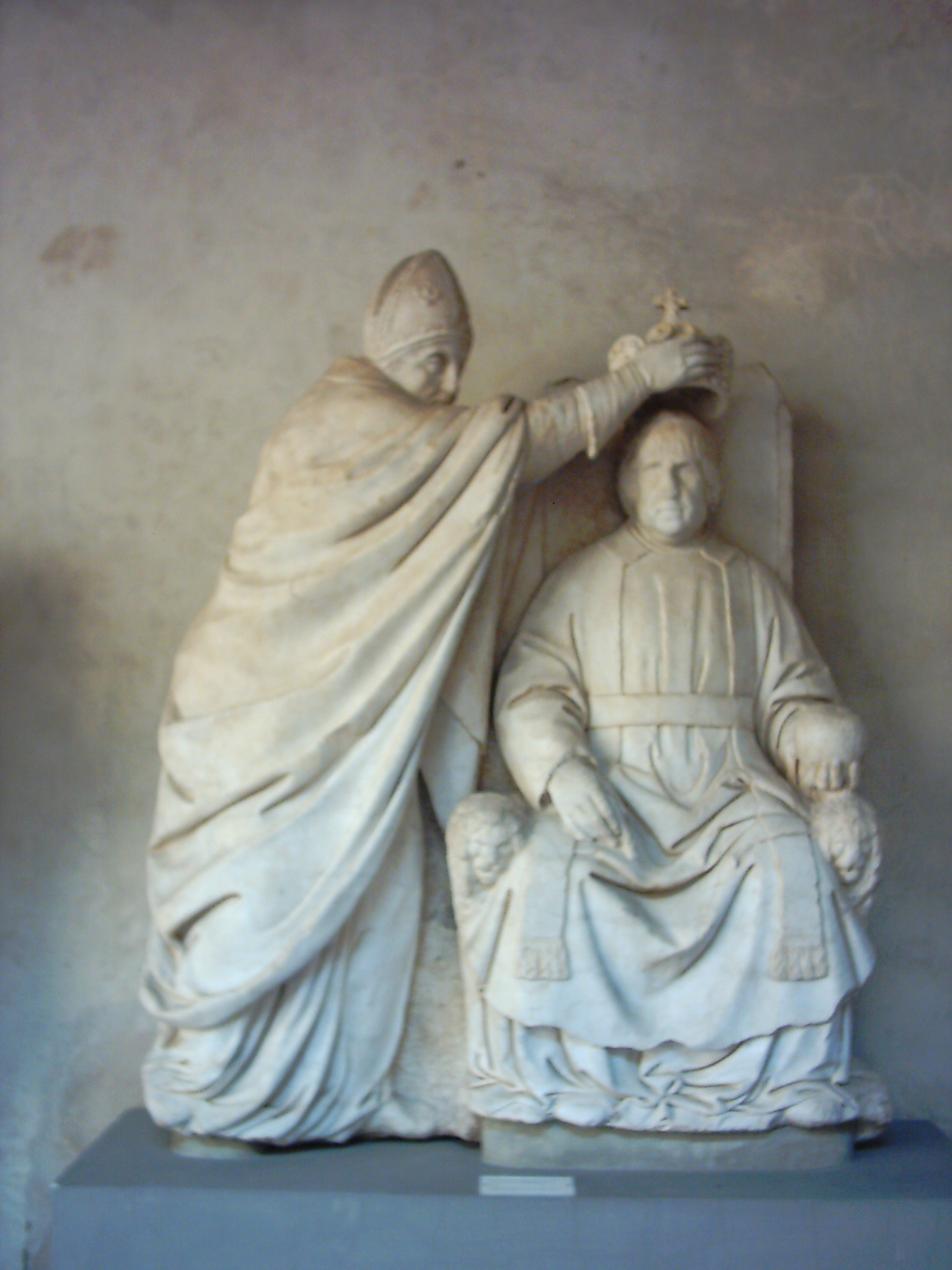
Sculpture depicting the coronation of Ferrante as king of Naples by Latino Orsini. Benedetto da Maiano, Bargello Museum, Florence

The pope died in August 1458 at an advanced age. His declining health was believed to be attributed by a combination of personal losses and disappointment that King John II of Aragon would not have succeeded in conquering the Kingdom of Naples.

Ferrante, relieved of the Pope's death, immediately sent Francesco II Del Balzo, Duke of Andria, and Antonio d'Alessandro, famous Jurisconsult, to ask for the investiture of the new Pope and to render him obedience. Accepted the audience, Pope Pius II did not want to neglect the interests of the Church: the investiture was granted him, but with many conditions: Ferrante had to pay the unpaid taxes, perpetually help the Pope with every request, return Benevento to the Church and Terracina, and other conditions agreed in the name of the Pope by Bernardo, Bishop of Spoleto and in the name of the King by Antonio d'Alessandro. All this was confirmed by the bull of Pius II, on November 2, 1458. After the Bull of Investiture, two more were sent: in the first the Pontiff advised Ferrante to send him a Cardinal Legate for the coronation and in the second he revoked the Bull Callixtus III had made against the King.

Ferrante was solemnly crowned on February 4, 1459, in the Cathedral of Barletta and to thank the Pope, in 1461, he wanted Maria, his natural daughter, to marry Antonio Piccolomini nephew of Pius, giving her as a dowry the Duchy of Amalfi, the county of Celano and the office of Great executioner for her husband. The problems, however, were not over yet, in fact Ferrante's rival, John of Anjou, aspired to regain the throne of Naples, lost by his father in the war against Alfonso.

=== The Angevin-Aragonese War (1460–1464) ===
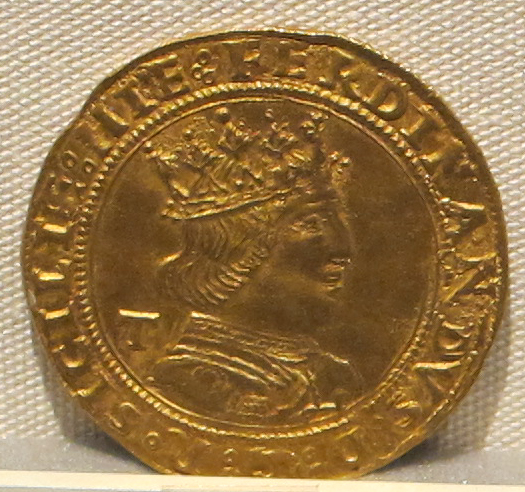
Gold coin with the crowned effigy of Ferrante I, king of Naples

In order to increase their power, the princes of Taranto and Marino Marzano, prince of Rossano, asked the King to return Antonio Centelles, Marquis of Crotone, Giosia Acquaviva, Duke of Atri, and Giulio Antonio Acquaviva, Count of Conversano, their relatives, to his state. Despite some initial refusals, the King wanted to please them. These united barons decided to urge King John of Aragon to come and conquer the kingdom that belonged to him by legitimate succession after the death of his brother Alfonso V, but King John refused. On the other hand, King Ferrante, having understood the intention of the barons, immediately sent Turco Cicinello and Antonio d'Alessandro to Spain to pray John not to lack love for his nephew the king, since he could say that the Kingdom of Naples was more his than the kingdoms of the Crown of Aragon.

These Ambassadors did not encounter much difficulty in propitiating the king, as even though he wanted to conquer Naples, he did not have the necessary military forces. However, they had great difficulty in settling another plague, because Queen Maria, who was the wife of King Alfonso V, died in Catalonia and left her dowries, amounting to four hundred thousand ducats, to the heir John II. King John claimed that the money should be taken from the treasury that Alfonso had left to the kingdom of Naples and the ambassadors agreed to give it to him in ten years.

Meanwhile, seeing his plan fail, the prince of Taranto attempted another enterprise with the help of the barons and above all of Marino Marzano, who hated Ferrante mortally because the rumor had spread that the king had committed incest with his Eleonora Marino's sister and wife. They decided to call in 1459 John, Duke of Anjou, son of King René, who was still in Genoa, to convince him to undertake the enterprise of conquering the throne of Naples. The latter, having received the embassy of the invitation from Marco della Ratta, immediately had galleys and ships armed.

On the other hand, the Prince of Taranto, who as Grand Constable of the kingdom controlled the entire army, recruited commanders who depended on him and bribed them to embrace his cause. While trying to suppress the first revolts in Apulia and Abruzzo, Ferrante received the notice that the Duke John with twenty-two galleys and four large ships had appeared in the marina di Sessa, between the mouth of the Garigliano and the Volturno. The Duke John was received by the Prince of Rossano and immediately pushed his army to the port of Naples, invading a large part of Terra di Lavoro. He then went to Capitanata where he found the Barons and the Peoples on his side: Lucera immediately opened the doors to him and Luigi Minutolo gave him back the Castle, so did Troia, Foggia, San Severo, Manfredonia and all the Castles of Mount Gargano. Ercole d'Este, who had been made Governor of the Capitanata by Ferrante, seeing all the lands of his jurisdiction rebel, at the behest of his brother Borso went to serve the duke. The Duke of Melfi, the Count of Avellino, the Count of Buccino, the Lord of Torremaggiore and the Lord of Santobuono all passed into the pay of John. The Prince of Taranto who was in Bari went as far as Bitonto to meet the duke and took him to Bari, where he was received with a royal apparatus.

In the meantime, Marino Marzano was trying to assassinate the king through traps and betrayals. The most important attack was the Torricella bite: Marino Marzano deceived the Catalan Gregorio Coreglia, who had been Ferrante's tutor, confiding in him that he wanted to make peace with the sovereign and ask for his grace. Having reported this message to the king, it was decided that the two should meet in a small church located in the place called Torricella near Teano on 29 May 1460 and it was set as a condition that each could bring two companions. Therefore, Ferrante brought with him Coreglia himself and Giovanni Ventimiglia, Count of Montesarchio, who, with a past as a man of arms over the years, was among the advisors of Ferrante, while Marino was accompanied by two leaders of the time: Deifobo dell'Anguillara, who, at the head of an army had previously forced Ferrante's troops to retreat from Venafro to Calvi, and Giacomo da Montagano, known in the chronicles as a very dangerous and ready-handed man, who had dropped into Terra di Lavoro on Christmas Eve to join the army of John of Anjou.

When Marino's attempt to lead Ferrante to a more sheltered place failed, citing as an excuse not to be seen by the French, camped on the Rocca di Teano. The two began to talk and an altercation arose. Deifobo, stating that he too wanted to reconcile with the sovereign, moved to meet him in order to attack him. However, Ferrante, seeing the dagger that he was hiding in his hand, drew his sword and faced the two conspirators alone, as the count and Coreglia were held at bay from Montagano. The King got the better of them, and before his troops arrived, he managed to wound them and put them to flight. In the excitement of the battle, the dagger that had fallen from Anguillara's hand was picked up by a soldier of Ferrante and it was discovered that he was poisoned, since, having touched a dog, he instantly fell dead. This event was then represented in the first, top left, of the six bas-reliefs impressed on the bronze door after the Arc de Triomphe in Castel Nuovo.

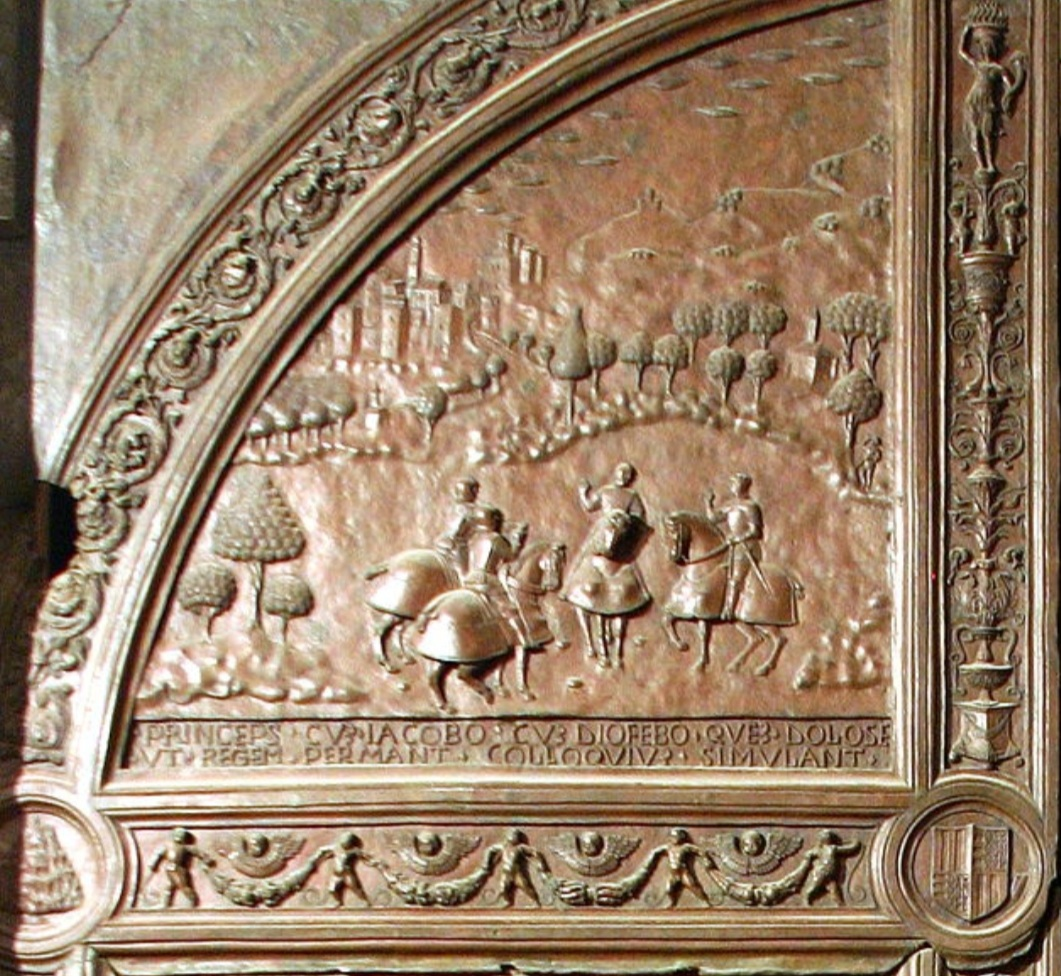
Depiction of the meeting of the Torricella of 1460, on a leaf of the bronze door of the Castel Nuovo in Naples, commissioned by Ferrante

The whole Principato Citra, Basilicata, and Calabria up to Cosenza raised the Angevin flags, and the rest of Calabria was rebelled by the Marquis of Crotone. It is said that at that point Queen Isabella of Chiaramonte, wife of Ferrante, seeing her desperate husband, disguised as a monk with her confessor, went to visit her uncle Prince of Taranto and begged him to keep her queen as he once had her, so much so that the prince moved away from hostilities.

John managed to reach the walls of Naples and would have even entered if the prudence of Queen Isabella, who had the whole city armed in the absence of her husband, had not prevented him from entering.

Ferrante was initially defeated by the Angevins and the rebel barons in the battle of Sarno on 7 July 1460. On that occasion, he was saved by the intervention of military troops, "provisioned" and "conscripts", of the city of Cava de' Tirreni, which were headed by the captains Giosuè and Marino Longo. These troops, arrived in Foce di Sarno, descended from the mountain and attacked the Angevins who, surprised and unable to determine the extent of the attack, were forced to retreat, giving King Ferrante the possibility of opening up through Nola, the escape to Naples. Fortunately for him, that battle did not have a decisive outcome, indeed the sovereign obtained further aid from the Duke of Milan Francesco Sforza.

==== The retaliation of Ferrante ====
The Duke of Milan entered the war in aid of Ferrante also for fear of the claims that the Duke of Orleans had on the State of Milan. Therefore, he sent his brother Alessandro Sforza and Roberto Sanseverino, Count of Caiazzo, who was the son of his sister, to the king, both to advise him and also to foster a reconciliation between the king and the barons. The arrival of the Count of Caiazzo greatly raised the fate of the war, because being a relative of the Count of Marsico and San Severino, he negotiated with him to return loyal to the king, managing in the end to convince him. The count gladly accepted the privileges that the king offered him, including the concession of the city of Salerno with the title of Prince, to be able to mint coins, and many other privileges. The Count of Marsico, who from that moment was called Prince of Salerno, immediately sent a messenger to Pope Pius II for the acquittal of the oath he had made to Duke John when he made him his Knight. From this episode many other barons followed his example, rejecting the Ordre du Croissant of which John had honored them as Knights. Pope Pius II, with the bull of January 5, 1460, absolved from the oath all those who had taken the Ordre du Croissant from John and undid this Confraternity. The agreement between the Prince of Salerno and the King overturned the war in favor of Ferrante because it opened the way for him to reconquer Calabria, since the lands of the Prince of Salerno from San Severino to Calabria belonged to him, to the Count of Capaccio, to the Count of Lauria, or to other followers of his lineage. The prince of Salerno then went with Roberto Orsini to conquer it. He managed to take Cosenza, which was sacked, Scigliano, Martorano, Nicastro, Bisignano, and in a short time almost the whole province returned to the king.

Meanwhile, Pope Pius II sent his nephew Antonio Piccolomini to help the king with 1000 horses and 500 foot soldiers, managing to reconquer the Terra di Lavoro. At the same time the Duke of Milan sent a new aid, with which he managed to reconquer many lands in Abruzzo. In the meantime, the king went to Lucera in Apulia, where Duke John lived, and who with a large army, was waiting for the Prince of Taranto. Many cities surrendered to Ferrante, such as San Severo, Dragonara, many lands of Mount Gargano, and finally Sant'Angelo. The king went down to the underground church of that famous sanctuary; he found a great deal of silver and gold, not only what had been donated for the great devotion to the sanctuary; but also what had been brought by priests from the nearby lands. Having noted it, he took it, promising after the victory to return everything; and with that silver he immediately had that coin called "Li Coronati di S. Angelo" struck, which benefited him a lot in this war.

Gjergj Kastrioti, nicknamed Skanderbeg, came to help King Ferrante from Albania with numerous ships, 700 horses, and 1000 veteran infantrymen. He was a very famous man at that time for his campaigns against the Turks of Mehmed II, who reciprocated the help of Alfonso the Magnanimous who, years earlier, when the Turks had attacked him in Albania where he ruled, had rescued him. His coming was so effective that he made his enemies wary of attacking him.

Ferrante went to meet Skanderbeg, welcomed him in celebration, and for several days gave him a grateful rest in Bari. Skanderbeg then had his soldiers gathered and raised their spirits by inspiring him with gratitude for the Aragonese and rekindling in them the love of glory.

Jacopo Piccinino, who commanded the allied army and observed its discomfort, demanded and obtained a truce. However, because he foresaw an unhappy end, he decided not to maintain the truce. Skanderbeg, having known this, told him that the next day he would engage him in battle and Skanderbeg, having arrived in Bari, joined Ferrante who had set up his camp in Orsara, in Apulia. The following day they came to arms and the Albanian, animated by the example of their leader and the King, fully defeated the enemy army, and Piccinino and John of Anjou were forced to flee. In this battle, four thousand enemies fell, and a thousand others remained prisoners with twenty-five flags and the victors, rich in the spoils of the vanquished, celebrated the triumph for 8 days. When Ferrante returned to Naples, the inhabitants welcomed him with lively cheers and renewed the sacrament of fidelity. Piccinino would later be invited to a friendly meeting with Ferdinand, arrested, and subsequently killed.

In the Terra di Bari only Trani remained on the Angevin side, which the ambitious Sicilian Fusianò was appointed by Ferrante to govern it and with the order to defend it. Seeing the kingdom in disorder, he took advantage of it to become master of the city, even starting to extort the inhabitants of the neighboring villages. However, the appearance of Skanderbeg in the area of Trani was enough for the downfall of such a rogue and he was pardoned by the King, therefore not being punished. Inanto, the gratitude that bound him to the Skanderbeg was not silent in Ferrante's heart and, wanting to give him a sign, he gave him to his own and perpetual heritage Trani, Siponto, and San Giovanni Rotondo, a city in Puglia and therefore opposite Albania.

The Cardinal Roverella, Apostolic Legate, who was in Benevento, managed to bring the side of Ferrante Orso Orsini and, after this episode, even the Marquis of Cotrone and the Count of Nicastro reconciled with the king.

Alfonso, Duke of Calabria, Ferrante's eldest son, who was less than 14 years old, was sent by his father under the protection of Luca Sanseverino to subdue Calabria.

The king, on the other hand, managed to defeat his enemies in Capitanata, took Troia, and entirely subdued that province. Some barons, seeing the defeats of the Angevins, decided to surrender to the king, as did Giovanni Caracciolo, Duke of Melfi, among other things.

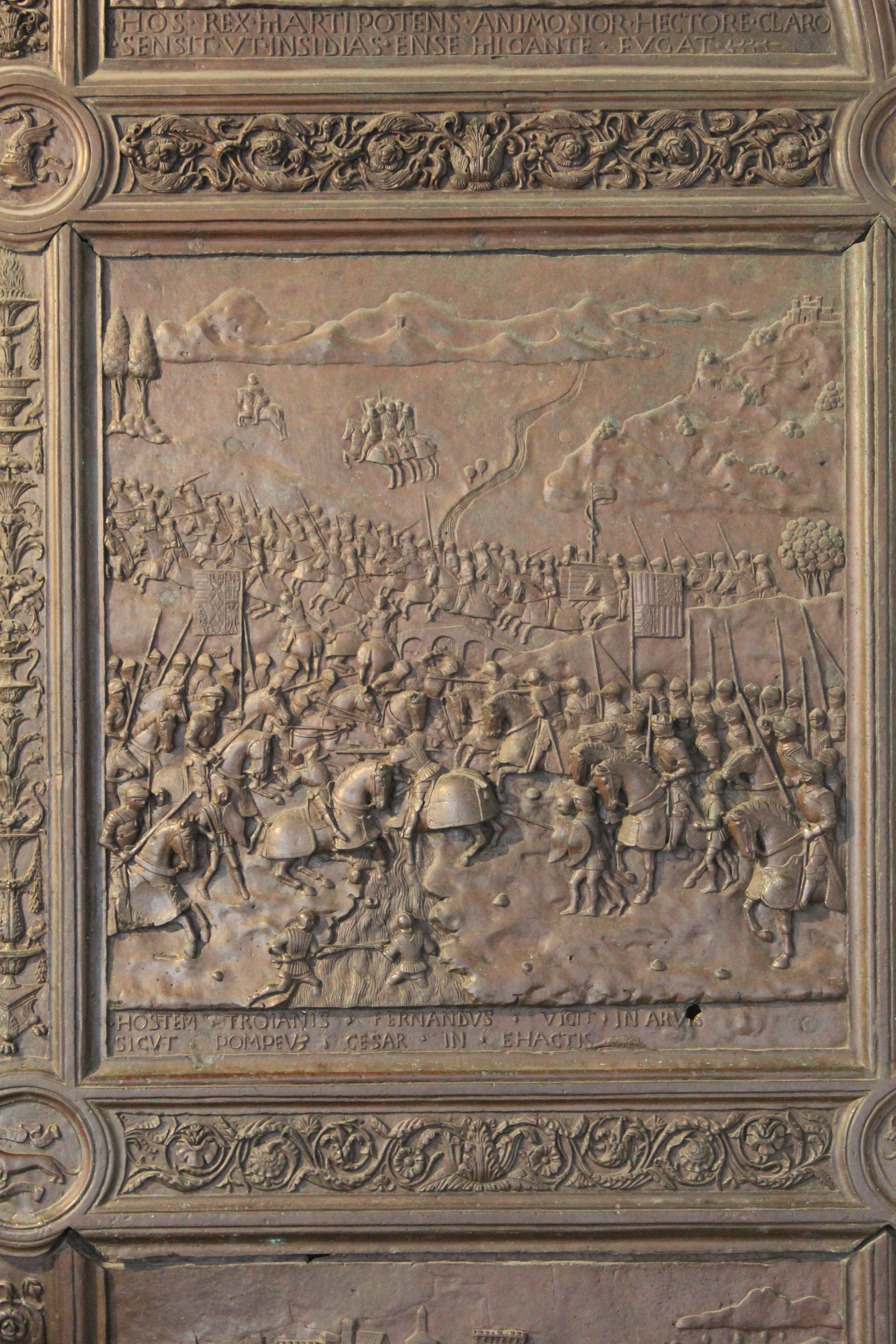
Depiction of the battle of Troia in 1462 on a leaf of the bronze door of the Castel Nuovo in Naples, commissioned by Ferrante

The fate of the war turned in Ferrante's favor on 18 August 1462 in Puglia with the battle of Troia, where King Ferrante and Alessandro Sforza inflicted a definitive defeat on their adversaries. After the battle, the ranks of Ferrante's enemies constantly fell apart.

Only the Terra di Lavoro remained to be subdued beyond the Volturno and Abruzzo, where the Duke John had fortified himself. The Prince of Rossano, on the other hand, was at war in Sora, where the Pope's army, urged by Ferrante for the assault, did not want to move, claiming that the Pope had not sent him to help the king, as there was no more need given that the Duke of Anjou was exhausted by the war, but that they had been sent only because the Pope demanded that the Duchy of Sora, the county of Arpino, and that of Celano having once been the territory of the Church, were returned to him. In order not to get involved in new disputes, he decided to give the county di Celano to Antonio Piccolomini, nephew of the Pope and his son-in-law, with the condition that he recognize the king as supreme lord.

Pope Pius then died, and with the same condition he gave the Duchy of Sora to Leonardo della Rovere, nephew of Pope Sixtus. Returning to the war, finally the Prince of Rossano capitulated, and through Cardinal Roverella, the peace treaty was concluded with some conditions, including a new parental bond: Ferrante had to grant Giambattista Marzano, son of Marino, his own daughter Beatrice, who was immediately sent to Sessa by her aunt Eleonora as a sign of peace.

Marino was subsequently imprisoned by Ferrante, who had already taken possession of all his fiefdom. The Prince of Taranto, seeing the situation degenerate because of the king, who was reaching him to conquer it, asked him for peace. Ferrante did not refuse it and sent Antonello Petruccio, his secretary, with Cardinal Roverella, the Pope's legate, to negotiate the conditions of the armistice with the Prince's ambassadors. Among the conditions of the armistice, there was that the prince was expelled from Puglia and the Duke John from all his fiefs. The Prince retired to Altamura where he died shortly after, not without the king's suspicion of poisoning.

On November 16, the death of Giovanni Antonio Orsini Del Balzo, Prince of Taranto, deprived the Angevin front of its most influential boss and financier. With his death, the original plan of Alfonso V of Aragon to make Taranto the pivotal principality in his and his heirs' hands was realized. The Apulian fiefdom was inherited by his wife Isabella and became a fundamental strength for Ferrante's resources.

==== The last Angevin stronghold ====
In September 1463 Duke John, abandoned by his allies, agreed with the king to go on the island of Ischia. After subduing Apulia, L'Aquila, and Abruzzo, Ferrante faced only the reconquest of Ischia, the last Angevin bulwark, where the Duke of Anjou had retired, and which was defended by the brothers Carlo and Giovanni Toreglia; these with eight galleys infested the Gulf of Naples to such an extent that King Ferrante asked for the intervention of his uncle John II of Aragon, who sent him Galzerano Richisens with numerous Catalan galleys. In the spring of 1464 John of Anjou, having seen himself isolated and defeated, left with two galleys for Provence.

After the Catalan army came, which he was no longer in need of, Ferrante gave a great gift to General Toreglia and sent the army back. When Duke John left the kingdom, he left a good memory to some peoples and nobles thanks to his numerous virtues, so many knights followed him to the France, including Count Nicola di Campobasso, Giacomo Galeota, and Rofallo del Giudice. The Duke John arrived in Provence and was called by the Catalans, who had rebelled against King John II of Aragon, an event for which Ferrante very rejoiced, as if the Duke John, his father René, and the King of Aragon were engaged in waging war with each other and would not have constituted a danger to Naples. Meanwhile, the County of Barcelona had rebelled against King John and had called King René to govern him. Ferrante, warned of the war, sent some militias to Catalonia to help his uncle.

=== Twenty years of prosperity ===
==== Marriage policy ====
After having triumphed against his enemies and subdued the whole kingdom, Ferrante thought of restoring it from the damage of the seven years of war that had upset him. First of all, through political marriages, he tried to keep the kingdom safe and therefore decided to marry his eldest son Alfonso with Ippolita, daughter of the Duke of Milan, the eldest daughter Eleanor with the Duke of Ferrara Ercole d'Este, and the younger Beatrice with King Matthias Corvinus of Hungary. All these celebrations were interrupted by mourning for the death of Queen Isabella, a woman of numerous virtues. She was mourned by everyone, and her body was taken to the church of San Pietro Martire, where her sepulcher can still be seen today. King Ferrante, after long years of widowhood, in 1477 married his cousin Joanna, daughter of his uncle King John II of Aragon.

==== Internal Politics during the Golden Age ====
The end of the rebellion of the barons was followed by twenty years of internal peace which allowed Ferrante to strengthen the state and increase its wealth. The confiscation of the lands of the rebel barons transformed the balance of power between the crown and the nobility of the kingdom. Ferrante, always distrustful of the barons, pushed his subjects to greater economic vigor with the introduction of new measures that effectively allowed the entire population of the kingdom to enjoy greater freedom in daily life. With a law of 1466, he allowed farmers to freely dispose of their products, releasing them from the obligation of having to sell the food to the local lord at the price he set.

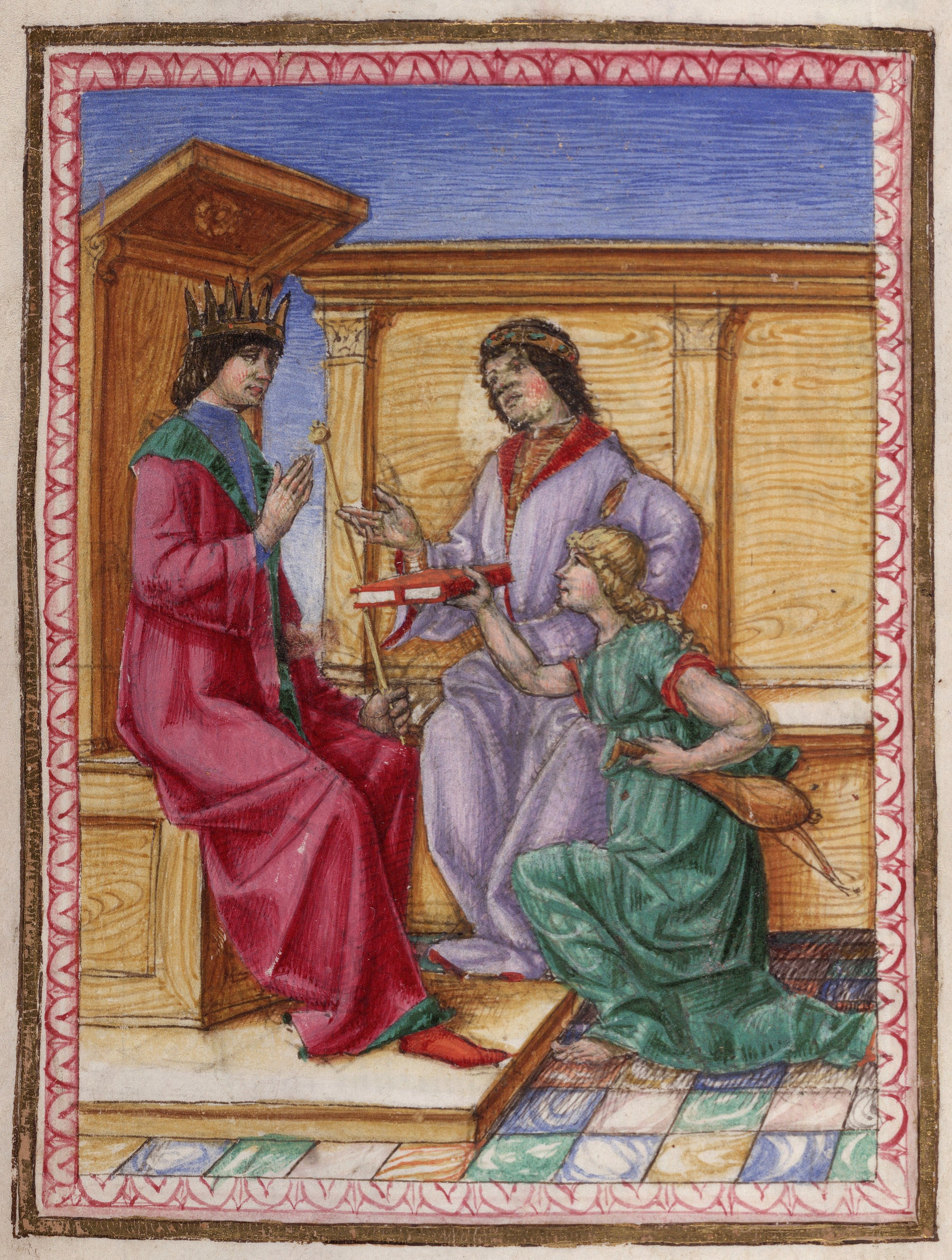
Miniature from the late 15th century, possibly from the 1480s showing King Ferrante receiving gifts

State-owned cities gained increasing importance as it imposed greater controls on baronial power. In the kingdom the Jews, protected by King Ferrante, carried out a notable artisanal and commercial activity. It was an important moment for municipal freedoms. The king himself granted statutes to state-owned cities and ratified those granted by the barons, favoring the growth of an urban aristocracy as a counterweight to the feudal nobility.

Furthermore, in 1466, in order to prevent the abandonment of the lands with its inevitable consequences, harmful to the tax authorities and to the well-being of the country, he ordered that the privileged classes, used to hoarding them, could not be of any obstacle to the free sale of the fruits of the earth, such as prices set at their discretion. In 1469, while confirming ecclesiastical immunities, he left them only to those who actually dedicated themselves to the practices of worship. He tried to reactivate the industries, especially those of silk and wool; indeed, he himself became an industrialist and merchant, associating himself with the daring enterprises of Francesco Coppola, later Count of Sarno.

Nor is the increase and promotion of the fine arts and cultural life less innovative. In fact, in addition to the erected architectures and the impulse given to the university, during his reign a true Italian and Latin culture was formed in the kingdom, which counted among its major representatives the Panormita, the Sannazaro, the Pontano: literature that reflected life of the country, its tendencies, its needs, especially through the works of Diomede Carafa, of Galateo, of Tristano Caracciolo, and, as such, it was destined to survive even in the following centuries.

The death of the Duke of Milan Francesco Sforza in 1466, followed later by that of Gjergj Kastrioti, Lord of Albania, deprived Ferrante of his closest friends.

==== The League of Italian powers ====
Ferrante further strengthened his power with a series of alliances. Around 1463 he promoted a league between the major Italian states: Naples, Florence, and Milan. The pacification of the kingdom of Naples had positive effects throughout Italy and the alliance was, as Ernesto Pontieri writes, also beneficial "for the purpose of preserving peace in Italy".

However, the equilibrium achieved with such great effort soon proved to be very precarious. The duchy of Milan Galeazzo Maria sforza in March 1470 allied himself with Louis XI of France, effectively invalidating the league with Florence and Naples. Ferrante, then, exploited the weak point of the Sforza power represented by Genoa, fomenting the rebellion of the capital, where in 1476 there were riots to the cry of "long live the king of Naples and long live freedom".

==== The war of the census ====
On 19 August 1464 Pius II also died, depriving Ferrante of his most faithful ally. The successor, Pope Paul II, recognizing that his predecessor had neglected the collection of the income due to the papacy, began to urge Ferrante to pay all the taxes he owed to the Holy See, which had not been paid for several years. Ferrante, aggravated by the excessive expenses for the last war, had run out of money and therefore not only apologized for not being able to pay them, but asked the Pontiff to subscribe to the payment. A discord was generated from this claim that stopped when the Pope asked for help from Ferrante to lower the power of the sons of the counts of Anguillara, who sent him troops.

Once the undertaking was over, the Pope renewed his request for censuses obtained with greater diligence than before. The King then demanded from the Pope to release the censuses for the expenses he had recently made to help him and also demanded for the future that the prior papal income from his kingdom, eight thousand oncie a year, should be reduced. He claimed that payment was excessive even for the Kingdom encompassing both Naples and Sicily, and that since Sicily was ruled by his uncle, King John of Aragon, Ferrante, and Naples should not pay the entire amount. The Pope on the other hand emphasized the help that Ferrante had received from his predecessor.

Ferrante added another claim: the restitution of Papal lands within the borders of the kingdom, consisting of Terracina in Terra di Lavoro, Cività Ducale and Leonessa in Abruzzo; and this in force of the agreement made in 1443 by Pope Eugene IV with his father King Alfonso V. Ferrante also demanded the restitution of Benevento, which he had granted to his ally Pope Pius, but now demanded its returned. The Pope, seeing how soured the mood of the King was, and not being able to resist him with the army or with other ways, immediately sent to Naples Cardinal Roverella to try to appease Ferrante, who then angrily ordered Alfonso his son to remove the Duchy of Sora to the Church. The Cardinal carried out the task so well that from then on there was no more talk of expired censuses, nor of the restitution of those lands. Other disputes arose between them for the defense of the Lords of Tolfa, given that the Pope was pretending that the city was his and laying siege to it, but the army of the King arrived and the army of the Pope, seeing that of Ferrante, fled immediately, leaving the siege. The disputes that the Kings of Naples had with the Roman Pontiffs were always bitter and continuous not only in Tolfa, but also in the territory of Pozzuoli and Agnano that the Pontiffs claimed belonged to them.

The death of Pope Paul on July 26, 1471, and the succession of Pope Sixtus IV, former Cardinal Francesco della Rovere, ended all discords. In 1475, Pope Sixtus in a Bull exempted Ferrante from having pay the census, save for the investiture to send him a well-trimmed white horse every year; thus the use of the chinea was introduced to Saint Peter. Ferrante, recognizing the virtues of this Pontiff, wanted to pay homage to him by giving the Duchy of Sora (which he had taken from Giovanni Paolo Cantelmo) to Leonardo della Rovere, with whom he then married one of his daughters.

==== The Aragonese Court ====
Ferrante, therefore, placed himself in a placid calm, marked the same footsteps of King Alfonso his Father, and did not neglect in these years of happiness and peace the need to reorganize the kingdom and enrich it with new arts and provide it with provided laws and institutes, also making at his court men of letters and illustrious in all sorts of sciences, and above all professors of civil and canonical law. In his reign, in addition to the splendor of the royal house, letters and writers flourished. In these years Naples had a golden age similar to the one it was in the reign of Charles II of Anjou for the promotion of art and for the many royals who adorned its palace, in fact Ferrante had numerous offspring like Carlo which increased its prestige. The Royal House of Naples in these times did not have to envy any court of the major princes of Europe, because one day in a feast celebrated in Naples more than fifty people of this royal family appeared, so much so that it was believed that they could never finish.

==== Foreign Policy During the Golden Age ====
In 1471, Ferrante made alliances with England, with Burgundy and with the Republic of Venice.

In this moment of peace, the Turkish danger reappeared with the conquest of the Venetian island of Negroponte by Mohammed II. Venice and Naples immediately undertook unitary actions of the fleets in the Aegean, slowing down the Ottoman expansionism. France and the Duchy of Milan unsuccessfully tried to thwart the alliance, potentially very dangerous for their Mediterranean interests. But it was instead Ferrante's ambition that decreed the end of the alliance, when in 1473 he demanded the possession of the island of Cyprus, protectorate of the Serenissima, proposing in complete secrecy to marry his son Alfonso with a daughter of King James. All this took place with the complicity of Pope Sixtus IV, who did not look favorably on Venetian expansionism in the Aegean.

In the rapid game of alliances and account-alliances that characterized the era, on 2 November 1474 an alliance pact was signed between Galeazzo Maria Sforza, Duke of Milan, and the Republics of Florence and Venice. Ferrante responded by contrasting the coalition with the State of the Church, stipulated in January 1475. On the occasion of the Jubilee of that year, Ferrante went to Rome together with some barons of the Kingdom, and the trip constituted an opportunity to further strengthen, through the alliance, the links between the Papal State and the Neapolitan kingdom. Thus two antithetical blocs were created, which again threatened peace in Italy. Ferrante, with his diplomacy made up of moves and countermoves, also forged ties with the Duke of Ferrara and the King of Hungary, who, as mentioned, had married two of his daughters.

King Louis XI, meanwhile, in 1475 had taken possession of Anjou, thus securing the Angevin rights to the throne of Naples. Later he proposed the marriage of his niece Anne of Savoy with Frederick, son of Ferrante, but the proposal was accepted only in 1478. In 1476 Galeazzo Maria Sforza died, and Ferrante wanted to take advantage of the occasion by trying, with the support of Pope Sisto IV, to take possession of the Duchy of Milan. Ferrante stirred up the Genoese and the Swiss against Milan to make the duchess regent were to defend itself on two sides. Genoa and Savona rebelled and the Swiss entered Lombardy in November 1478, but Milan knew how to defend itself. Ferrante's plan also failed because he did not obtain the support of the Emperor Frederick III of Habsburg, who was reluctant to meddle in the unstable arena of Italian politics. This furthermore led to the failure of the planned marriage between Frederick, son of Ferrante, and Kunigunde of Habsburg, daughter of the emperor. Sixtus IV himself understood that Ferrante's ambitious plans would end up bringing him into conflict with the other Italian states.

In any case, the Republic of Genoa, thanks to subsidies and the rebellion aroused by Ferrante, escaped the dominion of Sforza, becoming independent and with Prospero Adorno appointed doge of the republic. However, after internal discord between Adorni and Fregosi revived by the regency of Milan, Battista Fregoso was elected doge, and Adorno was forced to embark in a galley of King Ferrante who was returning to Naples.

Don Ferrante then completely overturned his policy, starting to secretly support the rebels of the Papal States, such as Niccolò Vitelli who fought the pontiff for the possession of Città di Castello. He made arrangements with Mohammed II, who was happy to find an ally against Venice. He entered into trade treaties with Syria, Egypt and Tunisia, which gave a beneficial impetus to the kingdom's trade and maritime traffic.

==== Don Ferrante and the printing press ====
In 1470 Ferrante was one of the first to introduce into Italy the printing press, recruiting with high salaries Arnold of Brussels, Sixtus Riessinger and Iodoco Havenstein. Among the books printed in Naples, were the Latin classics; Commentaries on the first books of the Code of the famous Antonio d'Alessandro; those on medicine by Angelo Catone da Supino; lectures on Philosophy; the work by Aniello Arcamone on the Constitutions of the kingdom; and poetry from both of fishermen and of heroes of Italy. Among the other Neapolitan books that were printed was also the Arcadia of the famous Sannazaro printed by Pietro Summonte, his dear friend. When Riessinger returned to Rome in 1478, Francesco Del Tuppo took over as director of the printing house and was the most prolific of the printer in 15th-century Naples.

==== The meeting between Don Ferrante and Saint Francesco of Paola ====
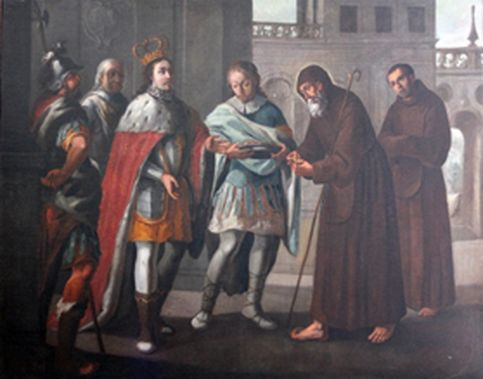
Blood from the broken coin, second half of the 18th century, picture gallery of the Sanctuary of San Francesco of Paola

Ferrante, at the insistence of the King of France Louis XI and driven by the fame of his integrity, had the monk Francis, famous for his holiness, come from Paola. The pious religious left his Calabria and was in Naples in 1481. Welcomed at Porta Nolana, he was received with great honor and courtesy by the King, who had him lodged in the Royal Palace of Castel Nuovo, in a small room that still exists. During this stay the king begged him, before going to France, to found a convent in Naples, making him choose the place to found it. The Saint chose a solitary and rocky place overlooking the sea, asylum for criminals, on the northern slopes of Mount Echia.

Warned not to be deceived in the election of the site, Francis prophesied that this place would be the most important and populated center not only in Naples, but in the whole Kingdom. The Convent was built with next to it, a church dedicated to San Luigi, called the church of San Luigi di Palazzo, for a chapel that existed at the time and dedicated to this saint. During the factory, many alms and a conspicuous donation from the King were received. The saint insistently requested and also obtained that the body of Saint Januarius be transferred to Naples, at which ceremony with great pomp celebrated by Cardinal Oliviero Carafa, he too wanted to attend.

Although the Kingdom of Naples was ruled by Ferrante, locally the effective power was the prerogative of the noble families, according to what was the feudal system. These barons oppressed the population, which occupied the lowest social level, so Ferrante tried to hinder their power. Francis also fulfilled in this historical context the mission of spreading the Christian life.

Wanting to prove his integrity - as it is said - Ferrante brought the saint to the parts of the current Piazza del Plebiscito and tempted him with a tray full of gold coins offered for the construction of a convent of the Minims in Naples, in the open space that today it is occupied by the colonnade of the Church of San Francesco di Paola. St. Francis refused, took a coin, broke it, and let out blood. The blood that came out of the coins was that of the subjects, of the people who suffered the powerful. Faced with a huge supply of money and a proposal of ultimate prosperity and wealth, anyone would be able to be seduced; so, it was not for the Saint.

When the latter then left for France at the invitation of King Louis XI, the Pope and the King of Naples took the opportunity to strengthen the fragile relations with France, foreseeing, in perspective, the possibility of reaching an agreement to abolish the Pragmatic Sanction of Bourges.

=== Government after twenty years of prosperity ===
==== Pazzi conspiracy (1478–1480) ====
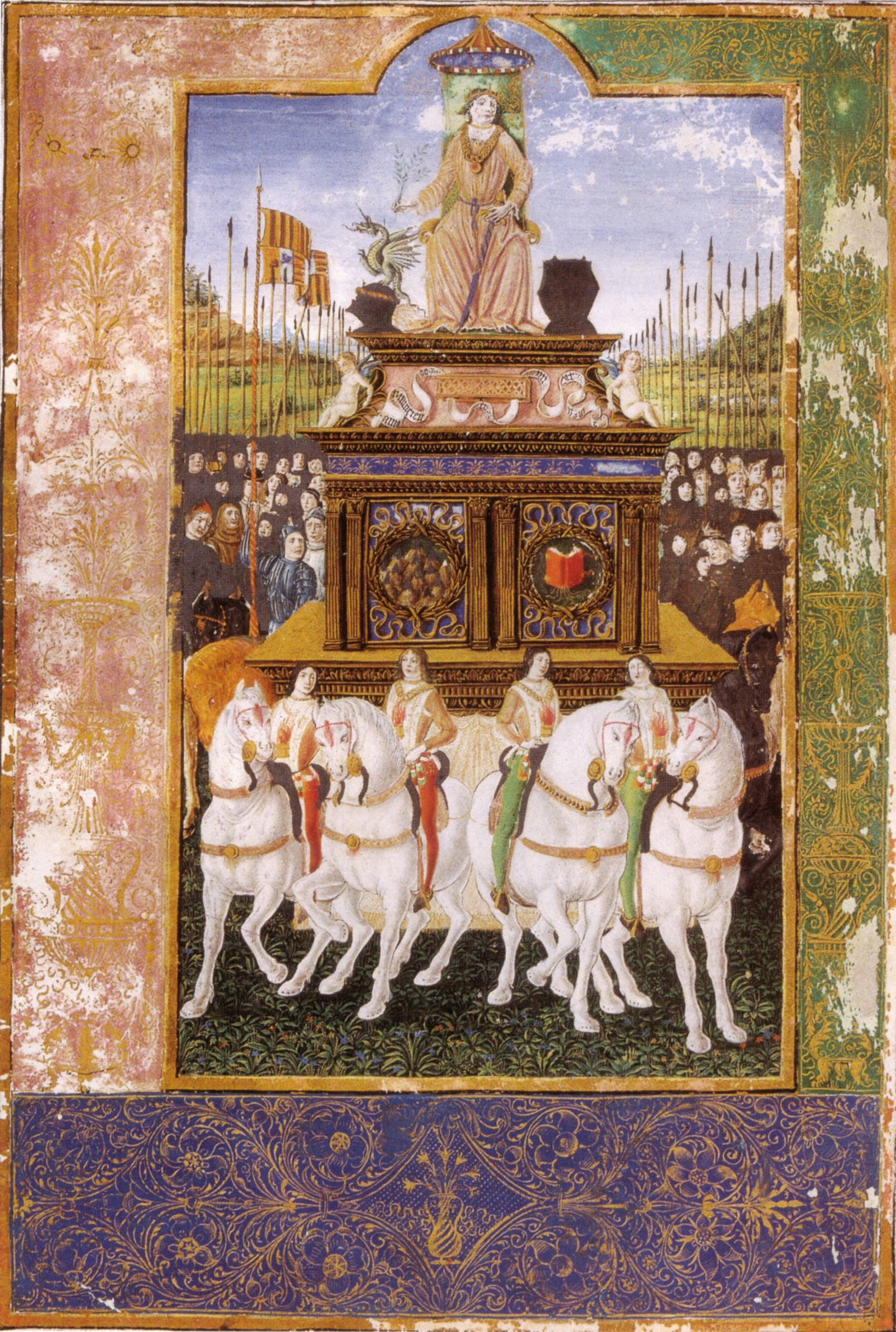
Triumph of Ferrante of Aragon, Kupferstichkabinett inv. 78c 24 f, Berlin

Ferrante's alliances rested mainly on the Sforza of Milan and the Este of Modena and Ferrara.

In 1478, at the time of the Pazzi conspiracy, he showed his desire to mediate peacefully, but after the outcome of the conspiracy, he sided against Lorenzo de' Medici and declared war on Florence. Ferrante managed to reach an agreement with the Turkish sultan, who unleashed his army against Venice, which, forced to defend itself, was unable to rush to Florence to help. The heir to the throne Alfonso, commander of the Neapolitan army, was sent to war in Tuscany, where he managed to be proclaimed lord of Siena. The Florentines had no choice but to come to terms with the king of Naples and an armistice was asked. Lorenzo de' Medici had realized that he could not afford the enmity of a sovereign so powerful and so close: he therefore set off for Naples to deal directly with Ferrante.

On 5 December 1479 Lorenzo the Magnificent embarked on Neapolitan ships in Pisa to reach Naples. All of Italy observed this trip with great interest, awaiting great decisions: the meeting had been well prepared and the welcome to Lorenzo, who arrived in Naples on 18 December 1479, exceeded all expectations. The peace, which was stipulated on 17 March 1480, provided for the alliance between Florence and Naples. When Pope Sixtus IV learned that Milan and the Duke of Ferrara also adhered to the treaty, he thought it best to ally himself with Venice.

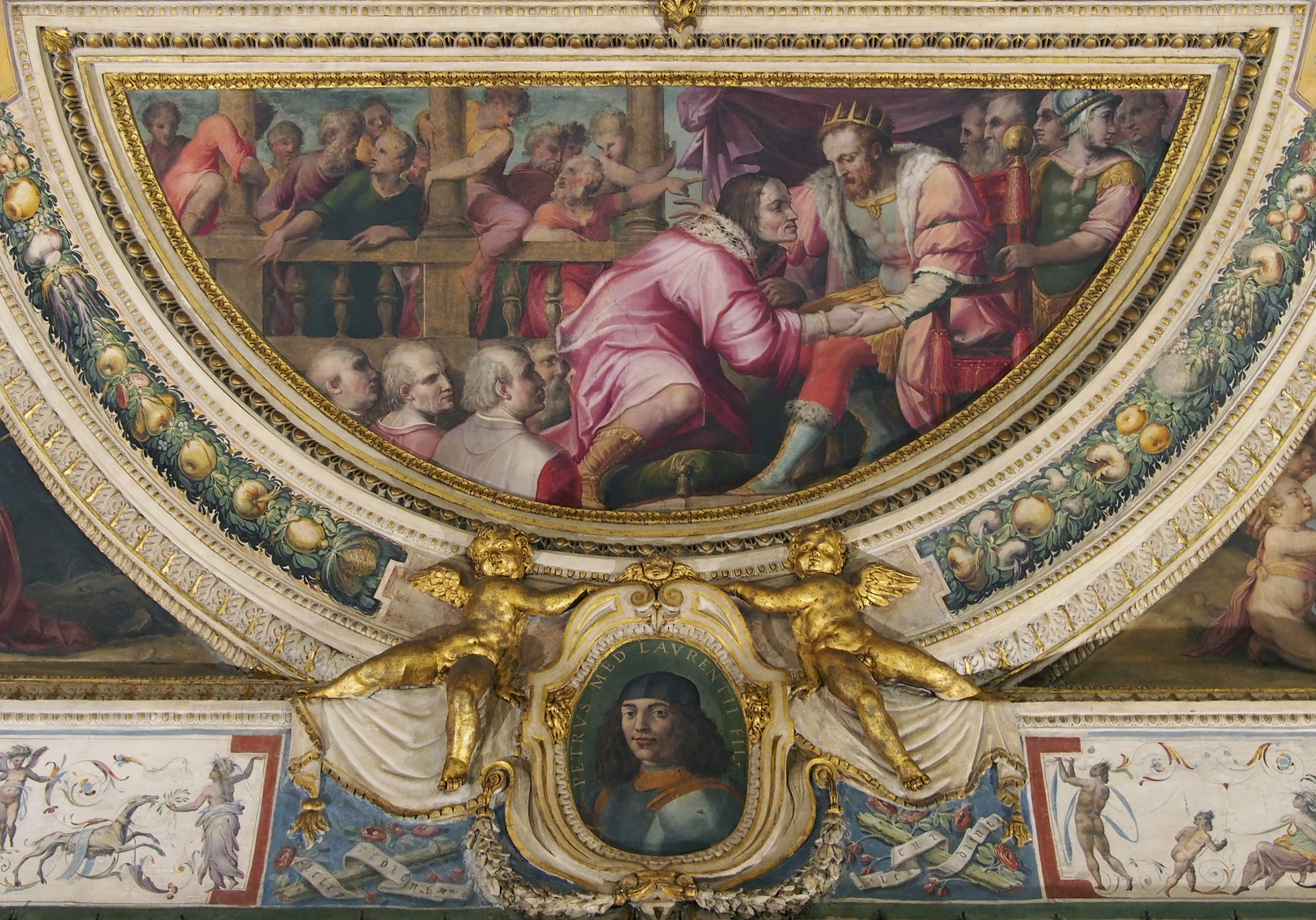
Lorenzo goes to Naples to Ferdinand of Aragon, painting by Giorgio Vasari and Marco da Faenza, Palazzo Vecchio, Sala di Lorenzo the Magnificent, Florence

The peace was granted, although the fate of the arms had been favorable to the Aragonese, and happy circumstances, such as the internal unrest in Milan and the neutrality of Venice, authorized consideration as the most opportune moment for Naples to attempt the conquest of an effective dominance over Italy. In any case, the alliance with Florence of Lorenzo de' Medici proved to be advantageous for Ferrante, so much so that in 1483 Ferrante appointed Lorenzo the Magnificent Chamber of the Kingdom. Such a title was more than anything else honorific, for the one who more than any other will prove to be a good ally of the king of Naples. The historian Ernesto Pontieri comments: "Ferrante, found in the league with Florence a bulwark against the enemy forces of his dynasty, which, as is well known, were the treacherous and riotous baronage inside and foreign suitors outside. Both contractors, the Aragonese and the Medici, remained faithful to the pacts agreed in Naples in 1480; and in reality, as long as they lived, no one violated the borders of Italy."

However, Lorenzo de' Medici's journey confirmed the fame that Ferrante enjoyed as "Judge of Italy". Furthermore, the opulence of his court and the wealth of means at his disposal created him the reputation of a very rich sovereign. Additionally, his diplomatic accomplishments, military victories, calculated financial and administrative reforms gave hope to the subjects who were favourable to his house.

==== War of Otranto (1480–1481) ====
Meanwhile, Lorenzo and Ferrante were negotiating in Naples, still in 1480, when Mehmed II, followed by a powerful fleet, began to threaten the Kingdom of Naples. Mehmed II appeared in the Otranto canal, where only a thousand fighters were protecting Otranto, while another 400 arrived from Naples led by Francesco Zurolo The citizens made a valiant defense more than the soldiers, but against the powerful and numerous Ottoman army, their constancy was useless against Gedik, commander of the expedition against Naples, which in the end managed to occupy Otranto in less than two months. This is when most of the population was massacred. Eight hundred citizens of Otranto were exhorted by the Ottomans to abandon the Catholic religion to convert to Islam. However, they chose martyrdom over conversion.

Having taken the city, Mehmed II called Gedik to him, who left his Lieutenant Ariadeno Baglivo of Negroponte with 7000 Turks and 500 horses in the city, and he with 12 Galleys, loaded the resources of the sack of that city and sent them to newly conquered Konstantiniyye. Ariadeno therefore, wishing to continue the conquests, thought of occupying Brindisi and laying siege to other cities. Ferrante, seeing his kingdom in danger, asked for help from all the princes of Europe and immediately sent a messenger to call Alfonso, his son in Tuscany, to leave the war against Florence and come to help the kingdom.

The Turkish danger was, explicitly, the basis of the royal decision to adequately fortify Brindisi. While the Turks were still barricaded in Otranto, in February 1481, Ferrante d'Aragona ordered the start of work for the construction of a fortress to guard the port of Brindisi: the Ferrante tower. Subsequently, in 1485, Alfonso, son of King Ferrante and then Duke of Calabria, transformed the keep of Ferrante into a castle. Thus was born the superb Aragonese castle of Brindisi.

The Duke of Calabria abandoned the war in Tuscany and having arrived in Naples on 10 September 1480, gathered an army of 80 Galere with some vessels and gave the command to Galeazzo Caracciolo, who arrived with the army in the Strait of Otranto, greatly frightened the enemy army. Shortly after, the Duke of Calabria himself joined him, accompanied by a large number of Neapolitan barons. The King of Hungary, brother-in-law of the Duke, sent 1700 soldiers and 300 Hungarian horses, and the Pope sent a cardinal with 22 Genoese galleys. The Pope, to thwart the danger from which he had threatened Italy, tried to unite the Italian governments in his will to make them act against the invasion of the Turks and absolved the Florentines from excommunication, forgiving them for all the injuries done to the Church. Ferrante, in exchange for 10,000 ducats, returned to them all the lands he had conquered during the conflict against Florence (Colle Val d'Elsa, Poggibonsi, Monte San Savino, Poggio Imperiale, and other fortified places in the Chianti and Valdelsa).

The Turks, after many battles, were finally forced to retreat into Otranto, where they defended themselves for a long time. The death of Mohammed II and the discord that arose between two of his sons, Cem Sultan and Bayezid, each of whom demanded the empire, prompted Ariaden to understand that the help he was waiting for would come very late, so he decided to surrender to Alfonso and, after having after concluding the peace negotiations, he embarked with the troops and set out for Constantinople.

The young Alfonso, enthusiastic about the success of the enterprise, after having fired the Hungarian soldiers finally returned to Naples, where he was acclaimed by the people and where he found the help that had come from Portugal and Spain, which he sent back. Many famous men of arms died in the war such as: Matteo di Capua, Count of Palena, Giulio Acquaviva, Count of Conversano, Don Diego Cavaniglia, and Marino Caracciolo. The bones of the heroic Martyrs of Otranto were then buried by Alfonso with all honors, some of which in the Church of Santa Maria Maddalena in Otranto, later transferred to the Church of Santa Caterina in Formiello, where they are venerated as relics of martyrs.

The praise for the victorious king was equal to the insane terror that had shocked Europe at the news of the Muslim landing in Apulia and Ferrante was hailed as the savior of Italy and Europe.

When Mehmed II died, a discord began between Bayezid and Zizim over who was to ascend the throne and the latter, through a safe conduct, gave himself into the hands of the Grand Master of Rhodes. Bayezid, eager to have it in his hands, petitioned the Grand Master and the knights to give it to him in exchange for one hundred thousand scudi, but the quibbles sent him first to France and then to Rome to the papal court first to Pope Sixtus IV and then to Pope Innocent VIII. Bayezid was very indignant for this and recruited a mighty army against the knights, which in 1483 passed over Rhodes. Ferrante, having learned that Rhodes was besieged and doubting that the island would not capitulate due to such a great obstacle, recruited a small army of ships and other woods to help it. The army sailed to Rhodes and not only rescued it but saved it valiantly from the impulses of enemies. This increased so much praise to the King, so much so that he was appointed curator of the Knights Hospitaller.

==== War of Ferrara (1482–1484) ====
In 1482 the Venetians and the Pope allied themselves against the Duke of Ferrara, son-in-law of King Ferrante, because he did not observe the agreements established between them in earlier times. The duke's two adversaries had already managed to occupy almost all the places in the Polesine and plunder the Ferrara countryside. King Ferrante, who for the past war of Otranto found himself tired and impoverished, did not dare to enter the war, but in the end also pushed by the will of the Duke of Calabria, resolved to help his son-in-law and daughter, with the aim also of preventing the Venetians and the Pope from increasing their territories. Then the King wanted to be advised privately and in public and it was suggested that Ferrara had to be defended, since defeated Hercules, the Pope and the Venetians would have done the same thing with him, in fact both claimed the Kingdom of Naples. In addition to the King, the Florentines and Ludovico Sforza, regent of the Duchy of Milan for his nephew Gian Galeazzo Maria Sforza took up arms to help Ferrara, with the resolution that the Florentines and the King harass the Pope and Ludovico troubled the borders of the Venetians, so than that Republic, having to defend the borders in many points harassed Ferrara with less impetus.

He then moved the Duke of Calabria with a flowery army in favor of Duke Ercole, but his having denied passage to the March of Ancona by the papal men at arms, turned to plague the lands of the Church and besieged by the favor of the Colonna and Savelli the same city of Rome; but Virginio Orsini, Count of Tagliacozzo, and Albe, seeing that Rome was in the thick of things, wanting to show himself religious and loving towards the Papal State, left this enterprise in the pay of the Duke of Calabria and courageously set out to defend the city.

Meanwhile Roberto Malatesta da Rimini, captain of the Venetians, went to help the Pope, and the duke withdrew to Velletri, where, forced to go to a place called Campomorto, he was engaged in battle, where the duke's army was defeated. Alfonso managed to escape miraculously thanks to four hundred Janissaries, who remained in the Terra di Otranto under him, who militated, who with great virtue, carried him safely to the walls of Nettuno. The main men-at-arms of his army remained in the power of the enemy, who, entering prisoners in Rome, adorned the triumph of the victor.

When the Duke of Calabria and the King found themselves in the greatest danger they had ever been, the death of Roberto Malatesta occurred shortly after the victory, and the Pope found himself without a captain and therefore unable to continue the war, he asked for peace and left the alliance with the Venetians came close to the king, allowing the Duke of Calabria to pass through his territories, who with two thousand horses went to the defense of Ferrara.

Wanting the Pope to allay the discords between the potentates of Italy, he wrote to the Venetians that he had to return everything they had occupied to the Duke of Ferrara, but they refused to do so, and despite the Pope having abandoned them, they stubbornly pursued the war, and also astonishing King Ferrante, they called in Italy the Duke of Lorraine, pretender to the throne of Naples by virtue of his ties with the Angevins, hoping that the duke would meet that of Milan, who was camped in the countryside of Rome, to convince him to ally with the Venetians. Their plan failed, however, because while that war lasted, it was administered by the duke with so much virtue and fortune, that if Ludovico Duke of Milan did not disband from the league, he would have taken away all the mainland from the Venetians.

Meanwhile, Pope Sixtus, upon the requisition of King Ferrante, excommunicated and banned the Venetians for disturbing the peace of Italy. By this means, the King sent his son Federico with fifty galleys to the sea of Ancona to damage the lands of the Venetians. The following spring, the Venetians put into the sea an army of one hundred and twenty woods with troops commanded by the Duke of Lorraine, René II, who occupied Gallipoli, Nardò, and Monopoli with resistance, as well as other smaller places in the Otranto area. The King, deeply afraid of the loss of these places, in order not to receive more damage, asked for peace, which he obtained on 27 August 1484 with the following condition:

The places that had been occupied in Lombardy by the Duke of Calabria were returned to the Venetians and they released the territories occupied in the duchy of Ferrara, Gallipoli, Nardò and Monopoli with all the lands they had occupied in the Kingdom of Naples.

==== Second conspiracy of the barons (1485–1486) ====
According to contemporary accounts, King Ferrante delegated much of the administration of the kingdom to Duke Alfonso during his later years. Some sources attribute this to Ferrante's age, his confidence in the duke, and his personal circumstances following his remarriage. Alfonso despised the barons, in fact, he always used to tell his confidants that if the barons had not been able to help their king in dire need during the war in Otranto, he wanted to teach him how the subjects must behave with their sovereign, assuring him that by oppressing the barons would have favored the people they exploited; and to spread the word of his opposition, Alfonso decided to place a crest broom on the helmet and some pincers in the saddle of the horse, demonstrating that he wanted to annihilate them. All this, combined with Ferrante's centralist government and Alfonso's cruelty towards the barons, led in 1485 to a second attempt at revolt. The barons, who had conceived a great hatred towards Alfonso, and feeling terrified by these threats, began to think how to get rid of it.

Meanwhile Sixtus had died and his successor, Pope Innocent VIII, after having lifted the excommunication of the Venetians that Sisto had given him, wanted to re-establish the payment of the census in the kingdom of Naples. The King on 29 June 1485 (the day set for payment) had sent Antonio d'Alessandro as his orator to Rome to present to the Pope the white horse in effect for the investiture, but the Pope did not want to receive it, so much so that Antonio was forced to make a public protest. On the other hand, the Barons, seeing the dissatisfaction of the Pope, thought of having recourse to him to be supported. The leaders and authors of this conspiracy were Francesco Coppola, Count of Sarno and Antonello Petrucci secretary of the King. The many riches and the many extraordinary favors that the King did to these two characters made them enter into the hatred and envy of many, especially the Duke of Calabria, who could not contain himself in saying in public that his Father in order to enrich them had impoverished himself.

The barons who conspired were Antonello Sanseverino, Prince of Salerno, Pirro Del Balzo, Prince of Altamura, the Prince of Bisignano, the Marquis del Vasto, the Duke of Atri, the Duke of Melfi, the Duke of Nardò, the Count of Lauria, the Count of Mileto, the Count of Nola and many other knights. These, gathered in Melfi for the wedding between Ippolita Sanseverino and Troiano Caracciolo, son of Giovanni Duca di Melfi, sent a messenger to Pope Innocent to ask for help and the Pope gladly accepted the undertaking.

Since both John Duke of Anjou and René his father had died, the Pontiff pushed Charles VIII of France to send René Duke of Lorraine to conquer the kingdom of Naples, of which he would have invested him, as long as he was always faithful to the Holy Church. Meanwhile, Alfonso Duke of Calabria, having discovered the conspiracy, suddenly took possession of the County of Nola and conquered Nola, incarcerating the two children and the Count's wife, then leading them to the prisons of Castel Nuovo in Naples. When the other conspirators learned what Alfonso had done, fearing that he would do the same with their fiefs, they openly began to arm themselves and revolt. In an instant the Kingdom was turned upside down: broken roads, no businesses, closed courts and every place full of confusion.

King Ferrante, shaken by these tumults, tried to quell them. The Prince of Bisignano, in order to give the other barons time to arm themselves, began to make a peace treaty with Ferrante who apparently seemed very willing to accept, but in reality, he had no intention of giving him anything. The one therefore tried with simulation to deceive the other, the barons proposed to the king very impertinent conditions; but they were all agreed. When they had to be signed, since the prince of Salerno and many barons resided in Salerno, the prince of Bisignano asked the king to send Don Frederick to Salerno for greater safety and sign them in his name. The King sent Frederick who was received by the Prince and the Barons, who greeted him with signs of esteem. Frederick was a prince endowed with rare and incomparable virtues, handsome, with very sweet behavior, moderate and modest, so much so that he was loved by all and of habits opposed to his brother Duke of Calabria.

Frederick therefore entered Salerno with the firm hope of concluding the peace; but one day the Prince of Salerno, having summoned the barons to his Palace and having Frederick enter the Castle in an eminent room, began with much eloquence to persuade him to take the kingdom they were offering him so that, having chased Alfonso, he would rest under his clemency, and certainly the old King would not have been offended by this, on the contrary he would have favored the will of men and of God. In short, he influenced the prince with great ardor, so much so that each baron believed that Frederick would not refuse the gift; but this prince who had neither ambition, nor immoderate thirst to dominate, but only virtue, after having thanked for the offer, very placidly replied that if by granting him the kingdom he had been under their control, he would have gladly accepted the gift, but Not being able to take possession of the kingdom, if not violating all the laws, the paternal will and the reason of his brother, he refused. When the conspirators understood Frederick's resolution, they turned pale, and seeing that they had to carry out the conspiracy, they imprisoned Frederick and to invigorate the Pope's soul they raised the Papal flags.

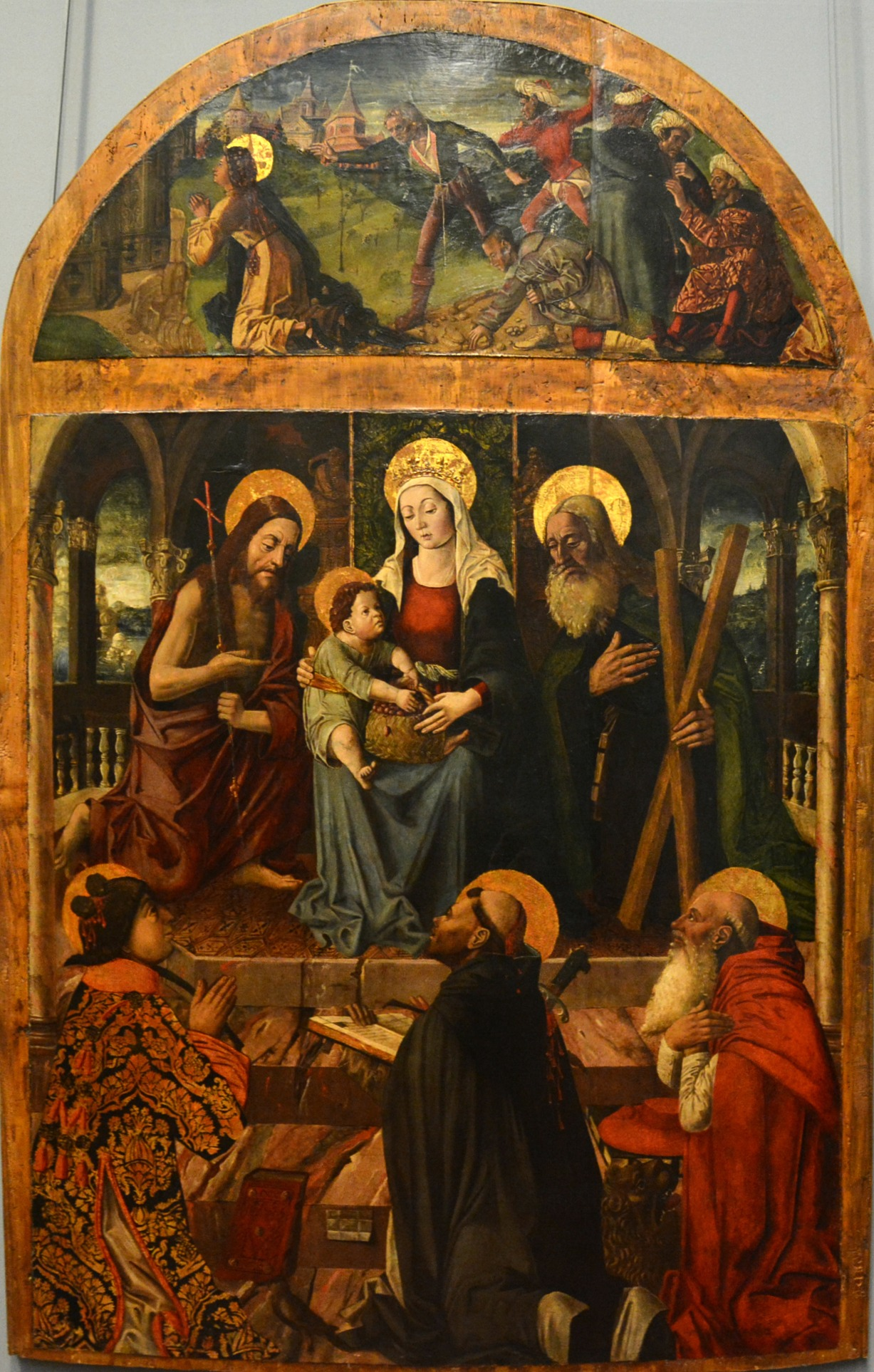
Ferrante (bottom left) depicted as Saint Stephen, Madonna and Child enthroned with saints, Pietro Befulco, National Museum of Capodimonte, Naples

Ferrante, infuriated by the incident, threatened to declare war on the Pope and sent the Duke of Calabria with a large army to the borders of the kingdom. The Duke of Calabria, before entering the war against the Papal State, declared that he was going not to offend the Holy See, but only to defend himself and free the kingdom from the snares of the rebels and declared that he was and always would be an obedient son of the Pontiff and of the Apostolic See.

Ferrante then published a proclamation with which he ordered all the clergy of the kingdom who resided in the Roman Court and had bishops, archbishops and benefits in the kingdom, to present themselves within fifteen days in his presence and to reside in their churches. Not having wanted to obey, the Archbishop of Salerno and the Bishops of Miletus and Teano, who were in Rome, were deprived of their income.

He then gathered another army, of which he gave the command to Ferrandino, prince of Capua, his nephew and eldest son of the Duke of Calabria. To compensate for the tender age of the prince, who was also very young, he gave him as companions the Count of Fondi, Maddaloni, and Marigliano, and also sent another army to Apulia, led by his son Duke of Sant'Angelo Francis, to control those lands.

Pope Innocent, terrified by the preparations for war, not seeing the appearance of René Duke of Lorraine, invited by him to conquer the kingdom, asked for help from the Venetian who were powerful in Italy at the time, promising him that, after the conquest of the kingdom, he would offer him good part of that, but the Venetians did not accept the offer and still neutrally tried to support both the Pope and the King, suitably for their own interests. Meanwhile, the Duke of Calabria had invaded the Papal State, and after having fought many battles, he had managed to get to the gates of Rome, laying siege to it. In the meantime, Ferrante tried, through tricks and deceptions, to bring the conspiring barons to his side.

The Pope, after three months, seeing neither René appear nor rescued by the Venetians, increasingly annoyed by the College of Cardinals and by the complaints of many soldiers and barons of the kingdom (who devastated the Papal States for not getting the pay from the Pontiff ), finally decided to enter into a peace treaty and persuade the barons to agree with the King. The Barons, unable otherwise, accepted the agreement, which on 12 August 1486, with the participation of the Archbishop of Milan, the Count of Tendiglia, Ambassadors of the King of Spain and Sicily, he was accepted in the name of King Ferrante by Giovanni Pontano, famous scholar of those times. Among the conditions of the treaty was that the King recognized the Roman Church, paying him the usual income, as well as the chinea, and stopped harassing the barons.

The Duke of Milan, Ferdinand the Catholic King of Aragon and Sicily and Lorenzo de' Medici were the ones who signed the agreement between Ferrante and the Barons.

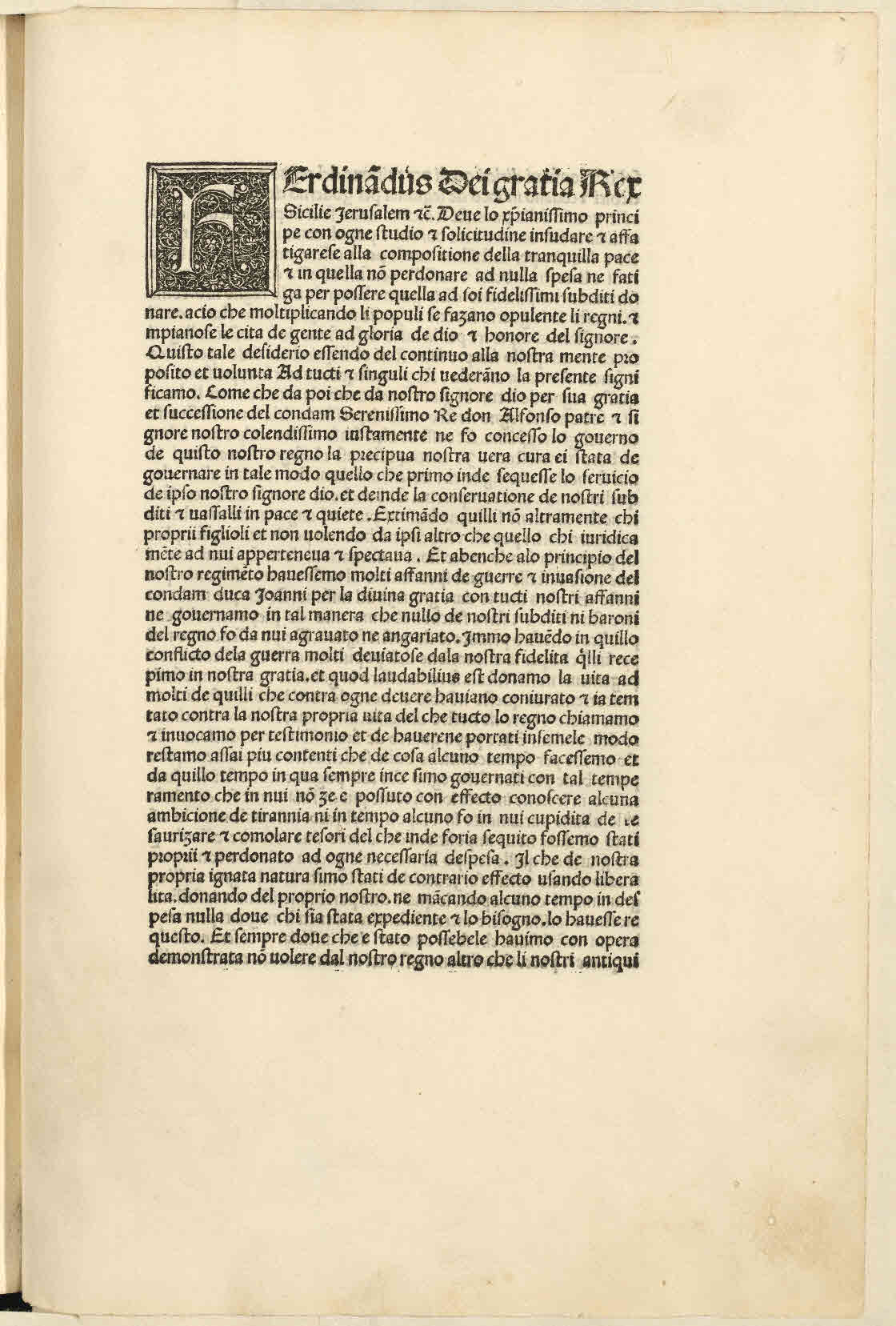
Exhortation to rise up against the rebel barons, 1486

Pope Innocent VIII, after the peace treaty, was a close friend of the king throughout his life and pleased him in everything he asked of him. On 4 June 1492 he sent a bull at his request in which he declared that after the death of Ferrante the successor of the kingdom would be his eldest son Alfonso Duke of Calabria, in compliance with the bulls of Pope Eugene IV and Pius II, his predecessors; and in the absence of the Duke of Calabria, Ferrandino should have succeeded.

==== Ferrante's revenge on the barons ====
The barons, although reassured by the Pope and the King of Spain and Sicily, knew Alfonso's cruelty and Ferrante's lack of faith towards them, remaining greatly afflicted by them. Pietro di Guevara, Grand Seneschal, died precisely of this affliction. After the peace, the barons, gathered together, fortified themselves in their fortresses; but the Duke of Calabria and King Ferrante, having them in their hands, tried to deceive them, offering them security and showing them their humanity. Many barons, deceived, were reassured, but the Prince of Salerno, suspecting the king's deception, escaped secretly from the kingdom and went to Rome, here seeing that the Pope had no intention of renewing the war, if he went in France.

Ferrante and Alfonso, in fact, imperiously felt the need to take revenge on the two traitor rioters, Coppola and Petrucci. The propitious moment was the celebration of the wedding of Marco, son of the Count of Sarno with the daughter of the Duke of Amalfi, nephew of the King, whose party took place in the great hall of the Castel Nuovo. All souls were filled with immense jubilation when suddenly they were arrested and destined with the others to last torture. Ferrante also imprisoned Francesco Coppola, Count of Sarno, the Secretary Petrucci, the Counts of Carinola and Policastro with his sons, Aniello Arcamone brother-in-law of the Secretary and Giovanni Impoù Catalano. After trials and other solemnities, they were condemned to the deprivation of all honors Titles, Dignity, Offices, Cavalry, Feuds, nobility and were condemned to be beheaded. Their assets were then incorporated into the tax authorities. Moving, however, was the speech and farewell that the Count of Sarno pronounced to his children from the top of the gallows.

After this episode, on 10 February the king imprisoned the Prince of Altamura, the Prince of Bisignano, the Duke of Melfi, the Duke of Nardò, the Count of Morcone, the Count of Lauria, the Count of Mileto, the Count of Noja, the Duke of Sessa and many other Knights. Stimulated by the Duke of Calabria made almost all of them die secretly; but to make the world believe that they were still alive the king sent them for a long time the provision for their needs. In the end, however, having been seen the executioner with a gold chain that belonged to the prince of Bisignano, the rumor spread that they had been slaughtered, closed in some sacks and thrown into the sea on a night of great storm.

==== The consequences ====
After this episode the clamors of the sovereigns arose from all sides for having violated the faith on which the sacred pact that granted forgiveness to all the barons was based.

Alfonso cleared himself and Ferrante did too, but in vain. The Pope then urged Charles VIII to invade the kingdom, however Ferrante with a new treaty averted the threat. In this time almost the whole kingdom had a great shortage of food and everywhere people could be seen dying of hunger, but the providence of the King purely took notice, using every means to make the condition of his peoples less sad. The Neapolitans, grateful, by public decree struck medals in his honor, in which there was on one side the effigy of the king with the letters Ferdinandus DG Hierusalem, Siciliae Rex and on the other a woman dressed in long clothes, having in the right two ears of wheat and on the left a corba full of ears with the following inscription: "Frug. Ac. Ordo. Et- P. Neap. Opt. Princip".

King Ferdinand the Catholic, having understood that Ferrante had disobeyed the pact, began to complain to him, taking the pretext of conquering the kingdom of Naples. King Ferrante, having understood the dissatisfaction of the Catholic King, sent Giovanni Nauclerio to Spain to apologize for not having been able to do anything else since the restless barons began to plot new conspiracies against him. Giovanni, seeing that the Catholic king was dissatisfied with that embassy, began to organize a wedding with the help of Queen Joanna, wife of Ferrante and sister of the Catholic King, between Ferrandino, eldest son of the Duke of Calabria, and one of the Ferdinand II's daughters, but the negotiations were not concluded.

==== Last years ====
After so many political events, Ferrante continued to direct the state. Active and hardworking, he was respectful of the customs of the nation. After having enriched himself and enriched the state with the ruin of the barons, to keep the kingdom safe and therefore to keep the greatest condottieri of that century at his service, such as Gian Giacomo Trivulzio, the two Prospero and Fabrizio Colonna, Niccolò di Pitigliano and many others, he began to fortify the fortresses of the capital again, without receiving a minimum of disturbance from these voluntary and pleasant operations.

Ferrante, with a Pragmatic entitled De scolaribus doctorandis, ordered his subjects to promote sciences in the capital and after Naples he wanted only the city of L'Aquila to be granted the privilege of license to open a Studium.

In 1486 he participated in the war for the Duchy of Milan in support of the Sforza.

In December 1491 Ferrante received a visit from a group of pilgrims returning from the Holy Land. This group was led by William I, Landgrave of Lower Hesse.

On April 8, 1492, Lorenzo de' Medici died, and shortly after also Innocent VIII. The Pope's successor was Alexander VI and that of Lorenzo Piero de' Medici, who continued to be an ally of King Ferrante. Encouraged by Ludovico Sforza, in 1493 the French king Charles VIII, heir to the Angevin pretenders of Naples, was preparing to invade Italy for the conquest of the Kingdom, and Ferrante understood that he was facing the greatest danger he had ever faced. With an almost prophetic instinct, he warned the Italian princes against the calamity that was about to befall them, but the negotiations with Pope Alexander VI and Ludovico il Moro failed, and Ferrante died before having assured peace to his kingdom.

=== The end of the reign ===
==== Death and burial ====
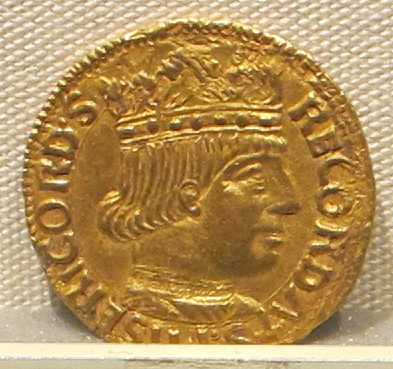
Coin with the effigy of Ferrante

King Ferrante, who up to 1493 with his prudence had maintained the peace both in the Kingdom and in Italy, knowing that France was preparing for war, began to reinforce the kingdom and to recruit armies to resist such a powerful enemy; but due to a great phlegm and then fever, on the fourteenth day of his infirmity, he died on January 25, 1494, overwhelmed more by the sorrows of the soul than by age. This tenacious man maintained physical health and mental clarity until the end of his life; his sturdy and muscular body withered in old age and his thick dark hair, cut short in the prime of life, became long and white, but only a few serious illnesses are remembered of him.

Shortly before his death, not believing that his time had really come, he had his hair and jaws accommodated, which seemed to be falling, but, suddenly feeling faint, trembling said to the children and grandchildren who were around him these words: "My children, be blessed"; and turning to a crucifix he said:""Deus, propitius esto mihi peccatori (God, forgive my sins)", and immediately died. The cause of his death was determined in 2006 to have been colorectal cancer (mucinous adenocarcinoma type with mutation in the KRas gene), by examination of his mummy. His remains show levels of carbon 13 and nitrogen 15 consistent with historical reports of considerable consumption of meat. The death of this sovereign was preceded by huge earthquakes, which caused many buildings to collapse in Naples, Capua, Gaeta, and Aversa. It is also said that on the day he was buried, the Mint of Naples had largely collapsed.

Ferrante's funeral, which was celebrated by order of Alfonso, was solemn, and neither the barons nor the primates of the city were second in giving him the extreme offices. Two funeral prayers were celebrated, one inside the Castel Nuovo in the presence of the militias and the other in the Church of San Domenico Maggiore.

His embalmed corpse was placed in a chest covered with gold brocade and was buried in the Basilica of San Domenico Maggiore. His sepulcher can be seen in the sacristy of the basilica. His heart was enclosed with very sweet heights in a small golden urn engraved with the verses: "Fernandus senior, qui condidit aurea saecla (Ferdinand the elder, who founded the golden age). Hic felix Italum vivit in ore virum (This happy Italian lives on in the talk of the town <lit.: in the mouth=conversations of men>".

His death, unfortunately fatal, led to ruin not only his progeny and the kingdom, but showered him of innumerable evils throughout the Italy.

On the throne he was succeeded by his son Alfonso II of Naples, who in turn abdicated very soon in favor of his own son Ferrandino due to the much-feared invasion of Charles VIII of France, who in 1494 fell to Italy.

The move did not have the desired effects: the Aragonese lineage was by now dangerously vacillating and the imminent arrival of the French sovereign pushed many Neapolitan nobles to take sides with the invader, facilitating the future fall of the royals from the throne.

== Appearance and personality ==
King Ferrante was of medium height, had a full head of brown hair, was dark-faced, and had a beautiful forehead and a proportionate waist. He was very robust and it was said that he was even endowed with superhuman strength, to the point that one day - as it is said - going to the Basilica of Santa Maria del Carmine to listen to mass, he met an angry bull sowing seeds in Piazza del Mercato and stopped him by grabbing him by a horn.

Ferrante was known to be a proficient conversationalist, modest, patient, and tolerant. He was generous, as he would give his jesters favors when they would amuse him, and gave a gift of 300 horses to a friend, Obietto Fieschi.

This sovereign was adorned with many letters and well versed in law, and he considered this science more necessary than any other for the rulers of peoples. He especially loved men of graceful mottos and poets and it is said that at their request he forgave those guilty of serious crimes. Ferrante greatly protected the sciences and letters and with great royal generosity he lavished on the men who were lovers of them and granted extensive privileges and aid to poor scholars. He was very fond of books, so much so that his library, called Aragonese, was celebrated as one of the main ones of those times. He was, as mentioned, a patron of the arts and a lover of letters, in fact he wrote a book containing someepistles and very elegant prayers called Militari, which was published in 1486, where his good taste for good letters can be seen. Pietro Napoli Signorelli cites two other letters with praise, one called Audiat hodierna die and the other Studebo quantum potero.

Although Sicily after the death of Alfonso I passed under the reign of Giovanni, King Ferrante wanted to make use of the title of King of Sicily, in fact in all the pragmatics and edicts read: Ferdinandus Arag. DG Rex Siciliae, Hierus, Ungariae, Valentiae etc.

Gaetano Canzano Avarna describes him as "selfish and ruthless, when he could promise himself some pleasure, he gladly obtained it, often at the expense of other people's unhappiness, not being scrupulous in this for that kind of hatred he had conceived for his fellow men, to whom he was happy to try those same goads that he himself had tried ". Indeed, if he generously remunerated those who had been loyal to his cause, such as Count Honored II Caetani, he was on the other hand severe, vindictive and cruel towards his enemies, and often resorted to deception and false promises in order to lure them in.

He organized numerous weddings of poor maidens and had a very rich tapestry that had been the property of Queen Giovanna II. After the King's death, the Duke of Ferrara bought it, who, seeing it by the Emperor Charles V in Reggio, in the Palazzo di Alfonso d'Este, was amazed. Don Ferrante left a Kingdom that he had made greater, for which many famous writers mentioned him in their famous writings. Ferrante was also very attached to music. He constantly sought singers educated at the Burgundy school and expert organ builders, all who received a warm welcome in his court. Among the numerous personalities present in his court chapel was the Flemish music theorist and composer Johannes Tinctoris. Ferrante himself is credited with a certain skill as an instrumentalist.

Like his father, Ferrante was also a man of great faith: attached to religious ceremonial, he professed the same devotion to the cult of the Virgin, washed the feet of the poor on Holy Thursday and attended the mass on his knees.

He was modest in eating and in his manner of presenting himself, although elegant in his ways and in dressing. He inherited his father's love for ceremonial and magnificence, as evidenced by the welcome given to a Burgundian embassy in 1472, one of the greatest manifestations of princely splendor of the time, according to Pontano, and the celebrations on the occasion of the marriage of the Duke of Calabria with Ippolita Maria Sforza.

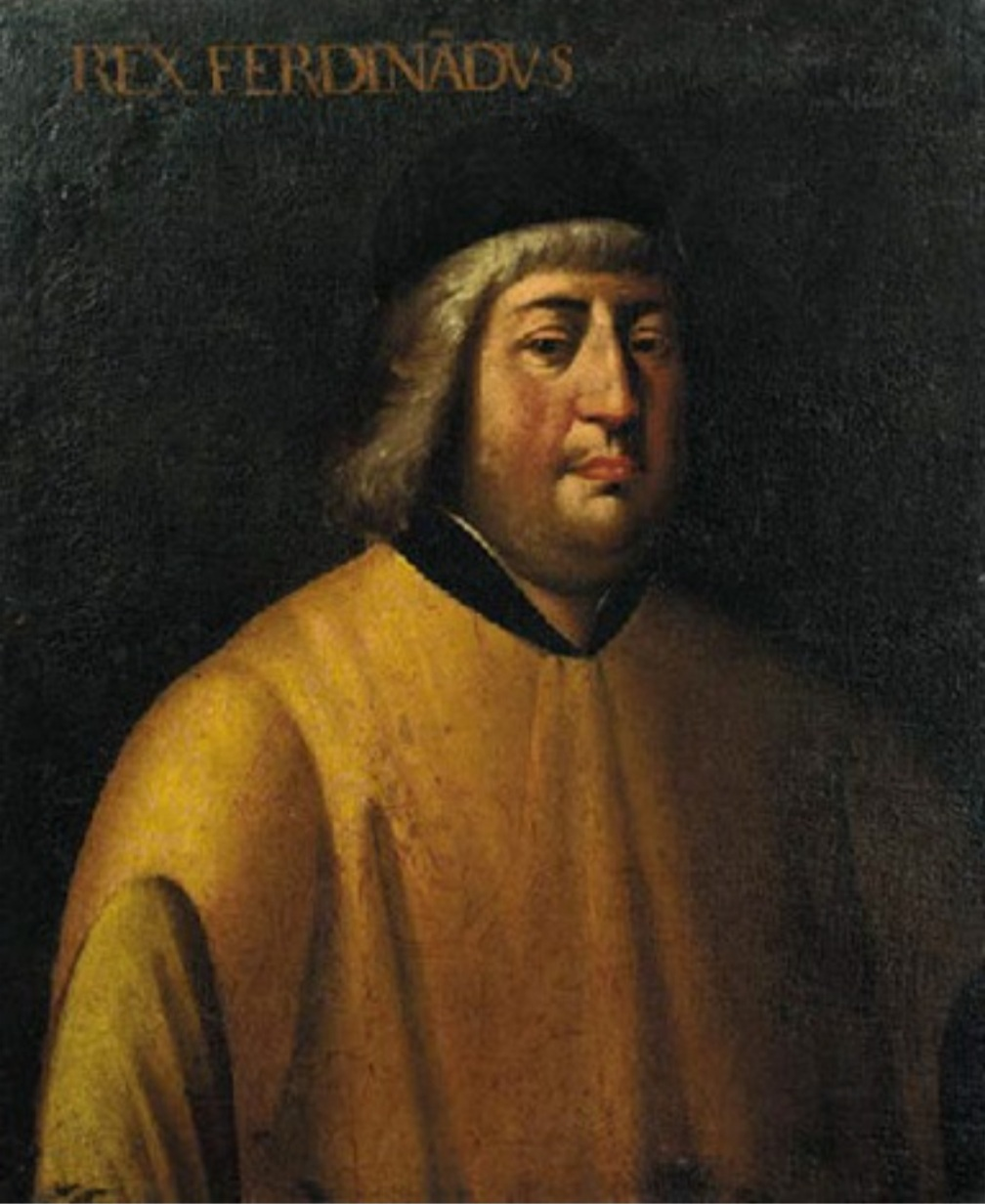
Posthumous portrait of King Ferrante of Aragon in an embroidered overcoat

He was fascinated, like other princes, by the sumptuous ceremonies of the Orders of chivalry, and having control of the Aragonese Order of the Giara, also known as the Giglio, he also founded the Order of the Ermine with the motto "Malo mori quam foedari", which conferred with liberality, receiving Orders such as the Golden Fleece and the Garter in exchange. His youthful passion for the more mundane aspects of cavalry, tournaments, and horseback riding lasted well beyond maturity, helping him to maintain physical strength.

He had an attraction towards young women and had numerous lovers and concubines, his wife was Isabella di Chiaramonte. He fathered numerous daughters, eldest of whom was Eleonora.

He loved children very much and liked to surround himself with them. In fact, when Eleonora herself went to visit Naples in 1477, Ferrante persuaded her to leave at his court, in addition to her newborn, also his little granddaughter Beatrice, who later grew up like a daughter. He also took under his own protection the two orphans of Count Don Diego Cavaniglia, or Troiano and Nicolina, as he had also protected Diego himself, who was very soon orphaned of a father.

When he imprisoned Marino Marzano for having betrayed him in the conspiracy of the barons, Ferrante, moved by tenderness towards his family, took care of them himself and particularly of his niece Camilla, who was educated at his court. The little Maria Balsa, daughter of the despot of Serbia or more probably of the lord of Misia, had also found refuge at his court, who together with her aunt Andronica Cominata fled from Greece invaded by the Turks.

== Ferrante's Naples ==
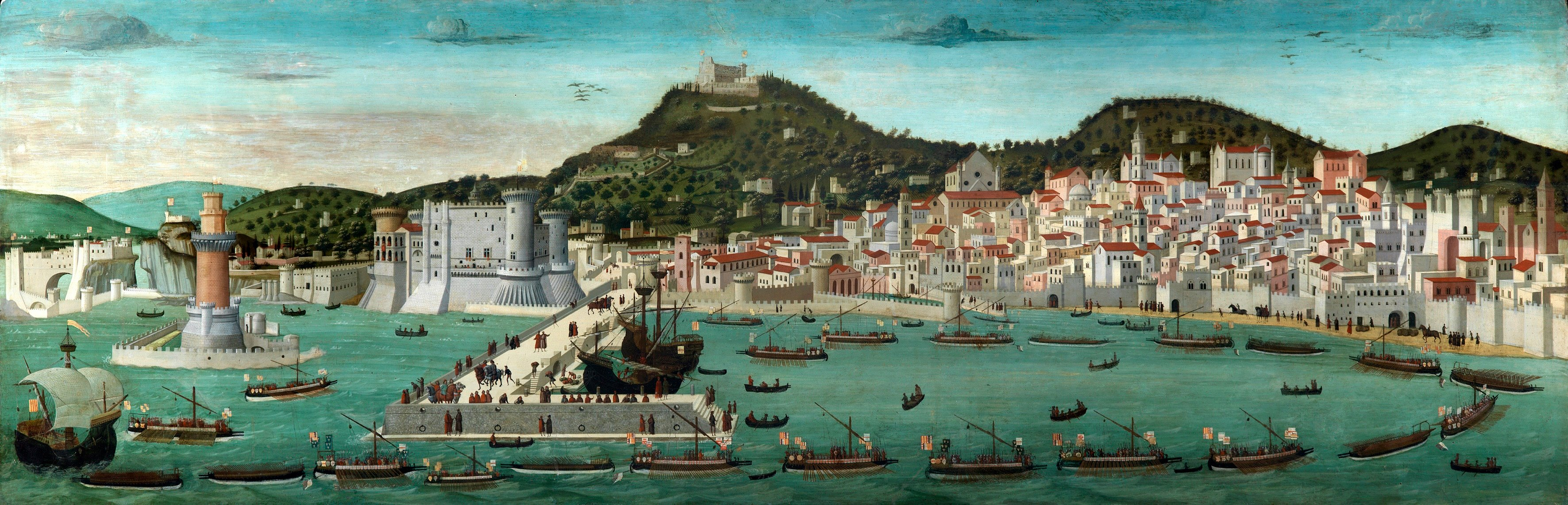
Tavola Strozzi, view of the city of Naples from the sea, 1470. (Triumphal return of the Neapolitan fleet after the victory against the pretender to the throne Giovanni d'Angiò, which took place off the coast of Ischia on July 7, 1465), National Museum of San Martino, Naples

Ferrante managed to lay the foundations for the formation of an embryo of a modern state thanks to the creation of new political institutions such as the Collateral Council and the consolidation of financial structures such as the Regia Camera della Sommaria.

The skills of Ferrante and his diplomats, skilled in weaving alliances in order to achieve Neapolitan hegemony in the system of Italian states, the fruits of the sovereign's economic strategy with the introduction of the art of silk and printing, politics of promotion and cultural attraction, the severe exercise of power also through the repression of the conspiracy of the barons led The Kingdom of Naples, with intellectuals of the caliber of Pontano, Panormita and others, to participate as a protagonist in Humanism and the Renaissance.

He was responsible for a first expansion of the walls of Naples, which was followed by a second one in 1499. The Aragonese wall of Naples, in fact, was begun under his reign, in June 1484. Ferrante surrounded Naples with walls towards the eastern side and reduced the walls erected by Giovanna II from the Dogana del Sale to the Corregge road into a larger form, today's Via Medina. On 15 June 1488 he placed the first stone of them behind the Carmelo monastery, where a tower was built, called Torre Spinelli, which took its name from the architect who had erected it, Francesco Spinelli. The walls were led up to the monastery of San Giovanni in Carbonara, who at that time was locked inside the city walls and gave the direction of this work to the architect Carlo Majano, who added the Lavinaro road to the city. In 1476, when he moved the customs office near the port, he ordered that the arsenal be moved under the walls of the royal palace.

Considered one of the greatest expressions of fifteenth-century defensive architecture, the walls stemmed from the need to strengthen the protections of the capital, especially in the aftermath of the Ottoman capture of Otranto in 1480. It replaced the obsolete Angevin curtain with a structure more responsive to the new defensive needs, deriving from the introduction of artillery. The new structure started from the Durazzo castle of the Sperone, of which the Brava tower is still recognizable today, with the Torre Il Trono. The development of the new fortification, delimiting the eastern side of the capital, was about two kilometers long and included twenty powerful cylindrical towers embanked at the base, including four gates. The thickness of the sections of curtain connecting the aforementioned towers reached in some cases even 7 meters and consisted of blocks of yellow tuff. The side facing the countryside was covered with blocks of high-strength gray piperno. Each tower was completely filled so that it could offer maximum passive resistance to the firing of the siege bombers. During the sixteenth century, in the viceregal period, the walls on the eastern side survived intact the renovation that took place under Pedro of Toledo, which led to the construction of a modern bastion wall to delimit the city. Contrary to the total demolition suffered by the latter starting from the mid-eighteenth century, the eastern walls resisted substantially intact until the post-unitary period and then underwent a partial demolition during the rehabilitation works.

Under his reign the construction of the Castel Nuovo was completed, the magnificent palace of Poggioreale was commissioned by his son Alfonso and the beautiful Palazzo Como was erected, now home to the Filangieri Museum (built between 1464 and 1490), Porta Nolana, the Palazzo Diomede Carafa (1470), the facade of the Palazzo Sanseverino, now the Church of Gesù Nuovo (1470), as well as the Porta Capuana (defined as the most beautiful door of the Renaissance together with the door of San Pietro in Perugia).

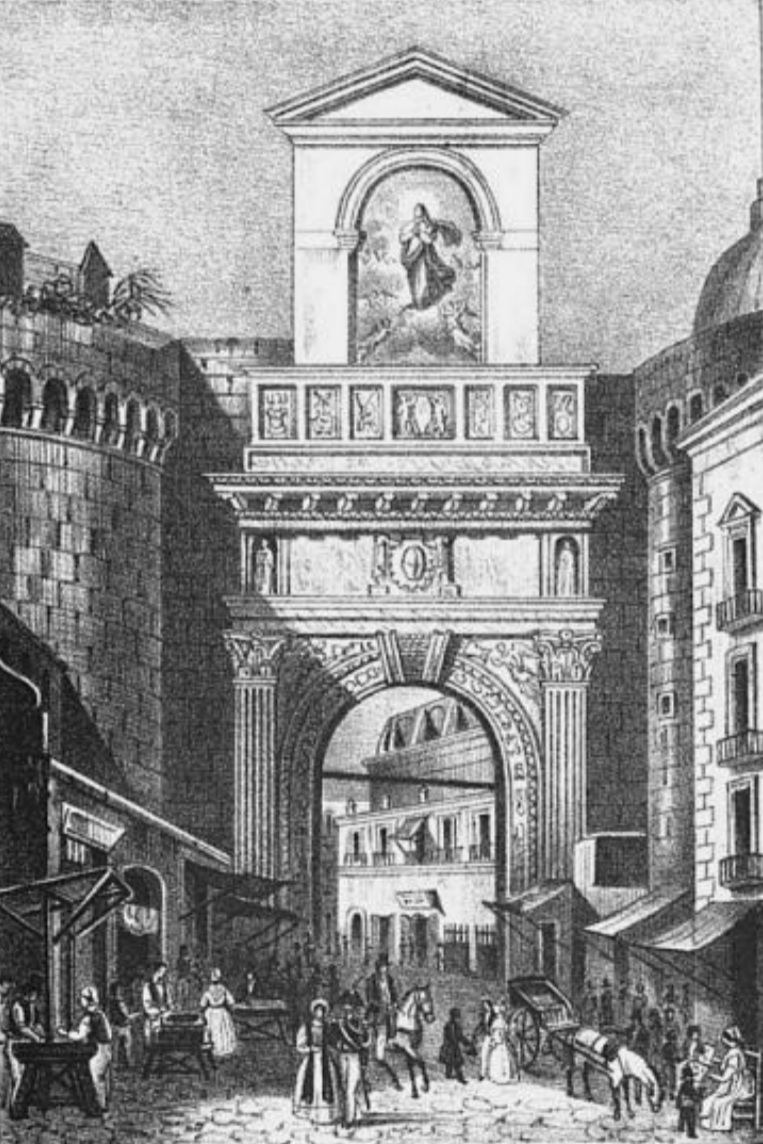
Porta Capuana erected at the behest of Ferrante in a print of 1823

Don Ferrante reformed the studies of the university of Naples, reopened in 1465 with a teaching staff of twenty-two members, supporting it much more than his father had, and allowed the study to be added to the traditional course of study humanistic of Greek and Latin, even if, in reality, its purpose had perhaps been to restore the university monopoly of higher education under strict state control, as its founder Frederick II had conceived it . In 1478 he had such confidence in the possibilities offered by the University of Naplesto prohibit his subjects from studying or seeking a doctorate outside the Kingdom. Teachers were also recruited into the Kingdom and, among the few foreigners appointed, only the Florentine Francesco Pucci found the Neapolitan environment tempting enough to remain there forever. Furthermore, Ferrante managed to ensure that the university flourished through learned professors; and for this purpose he invited Costantino Lascaris with his gracious diploma to come and teach the Greek language, assigning him a large salary corresponding to the fame of his name. Ferrante, with a Pragmatic entitled De scolaribus doctorandis, ordered his subjects to promote sciences in the capital and wanted the city of Aquila to grant itself the privilege of license to open a Studium.

Ferrante promoted Renaissance culture and art with his patronage, surrounding himself with numerous artists and writers who flourished in his kingdom such as: Pico della Mirandola, Marsilio Ficino, Bartolomeo Platina, Jacopo della Pila, Raffaele Volaterrano, Antonio Fiorentino della Cava, Francesco di Giorgio Martini, Pietro and Ippolito del Donzello, Francesco Del Tuppo, Giovanni Giocondo, Giovanni Francesco Mormando, Francesco Laurana, Pietro da Milano, Cola Rapicano, Cristoforo Majorana, Tommaso and Giovan Tommaso Malvito, Ermolao Barbaro the Younger and the Elder, Giuliano and Benedetto da Maiano, Bernardo Rossellino, Francesco Pagano, Riccardo Quartararo, Pietro Befulco, Novello da San Lucano, Guido Mazzoni, Niccolò Antonio known as Colantonio, Angiolillo Arcuccio, Antonio De Ferraris, Poliziano, Teodoro Gaza, Cola Rapicano, Pietro Alemanno, Giovanni Pontano, Antonio Beccadelli and many others. The Panormita was the second secretary of the King and President of the Chamber. Il Pontano succeeded Beccadelli as rector of the renowned Academy of Naples founded by his predecessor (one of the first academies founded in Europe, the first of the Kingdom of Naples and the oldest in Italystill existing), of which he was the main representative and which was later named after him, whose most illustrious students were: Sannazaro, Antonio Flaminio, Cardinal Sadoleto, Giano Anisio, Giovanni Cotta, Andrea Sabatini, Andrea Matteo III Acquaviva and many others.

Ferrante completed the construction and decoration of the Castel Nuovo using artisans of almost exclusively Italian origin such as Pietro da Milano, one of the artists called by Alfonso I, who returned with Francesco Laurana in 1465 to complete the triumphal arch and to make some busts of the royal family. By order of Ferrante, as a lasting warning, the splendid bronze door of the Castel Nuovo, called La Vittoriosa, was cast in bronze, through the artillery removed by the enemies, with the representation of the king's triumph in the conspiracy of the barons, the work of Guglielmo Dello Monaco, a Parisian who had served Alfonso as a manufacturer of cannons, clocks and bells. On the door appear in six pictures expressed in bas - relief some events of the conspiracy: in the first of them, from the left side of the beholder, the apparent peace of the Duke of Sessa is scrolled, with the verses that say: "PRINCEPS CVM IACOBO CVM DIOFEBO QVEM DOLOSE / VT REGEM PERMANT COLLOQVIVM SIMVLANT". Likewise in the first one on the right is represented the King who valiantly puts the conspirators to flight with the verses: "HOS REX MARTIPOTENS ANIMOSIOR HECTORE CLARO / SENSIT VT INSIDIAS ENSE MICANTE FVGAT". The other paintings represent the siege with the taking of Troy and the surrender of Acquaviva, with the carved verses that say: TROIA DEDIT OUR REQVIEM FINEMQ (VE) LABORI / IN QVA HOSTEM FVDI FORTITER AC POPVLI "; " HOSTEM TROIANIS FERNANDVS VICIT IN ARVIS / SICVT POMPEVM CESAR IN EHACTIS"; " HINC TROIAM VERSVS MAGNO CONCVSSA FEAR / CASTRA MOVENT HOSTES NE SVBITO PEREANT"; "AQVA DIA FORTEM CEPIT REX FORTIOR VRBEM/ ANDEGAVOS PELLENS VIRIBVS EXIMII". Towards the end of his life, Ferrante also planned the construction of a large building, a huge Renaissance-style palace perhaps intended to accommodate the administration and the court of justice, but which was never built.

Ferrante erected the Porta del Carmine and that of San Gennaro and for this work he spent 28466 ducats, on his order the table bridges placed in front of each gate of the city were removed and on the side of the Carmelo church he had that door built that can be seen adorned of travertine stones, he had the Porta Capuana transported, which was near the Castel Capuano on the sides of the church of Santa Caterina in Formiello, where it was magnificently built with sculptures worked in marvelous fine marbles, he had an armory built such as to be able to contain weapons for sixty thousand soldiers, completed the famous tower that now serves as the bell tower of the Basilica of San Lorenzo Maggiore begun by Charles II, for his arrangement the cenacle of the friars of Santa Maria la Nova was painted by the brothers Pietro and Ippolito del Donzello and he also had many places of worship repaired, adorning them with precious furnishings.

To his Christian piety we owe the reconstruction of the Cathedral Church of Naples, which almost completely collapsed due to the terrible earthquakes of 5 and 30 December 1456, causing the death of thirty thousand people in the capital. He wanted many Neapolitan noble families to participate in this reconstruction, which had patronage chapels there, allowing them to place their noble weapons on each pillar of the chapels to rebuild. In Novello da San Lucano, he entrusted him with the reconstruction of the basilica of San Domenico Maggiore, after the ruin of a large part of the building due to the previous earthquake. The De Dominicihe says that the pillars were placed by him, the ceiling was renovated, and the ornaments of the chapel were completed, but in the biography of the del Donzello, contained in his work, he also attributes to them the direction of some works. Terminio adds that, as an example to Ferrante, many nobles contributed to the expense of new pillars, at the top of which they placed their insignia.

In 1486, Ferrante commissioned the architect and military engineer Francesco di Giorgio Martini to expand the fortress of Taranto built by the Byzantines, in order to replace the medieval type of towers conceived for the plumbing defense. In fact, the use of cannons following the discovery of gunpowder required wide and low circular towers to cushion the impact of cannonballs, equipped with ramps or slides that allowed the pieces to be moved from one tower to the other. 'other, as well as equipped with a large and sturdy parapet with specific openings for the guns. The new fortification was to include seven towers, four of which joined to form a quadrilateral, and the remaining three aligned along the moat to the Mar Piccolo. The four towers were respectively dedicated to San Cristofalo, San Lorenzo, the Bandiera and the Vergine Annunziata.

Thus was born the Aragonese castle of the city, and in 1491 the triangular-shaped ravelin between the Torre della Bandiera and the San Cristofalo tower was added on the side facing the Great Sea. The castle was completed in 1492, as can be seen from the engraving of a walled plaque on the "Porta Paterna" together with the Aragonese coat of arms quartered with the tripartite of Angiò family:

"Ferdinandus Rex Divi Alphonsi Filius Divi Ferdinandi Nepos Aragonius Arcem Ha(n)c Vetustate Collabente(m) Ad Im(pe)tus Tormentorum Substine(n)dos Quae (Ni)mio Feruntur Spiritu In Ampliorem Firmioremq(ue) Formam Restituit Millesimo CCCCLXXXXII".

"King Ferdinand of Aragon, son of the divine Alfonso and grandson of the divine Ferdinand, rebuilt this castle in a larger and more solid form due to old age, so that it could withstand the impetus of the bullets that is endured with maximum vigor - 1492."

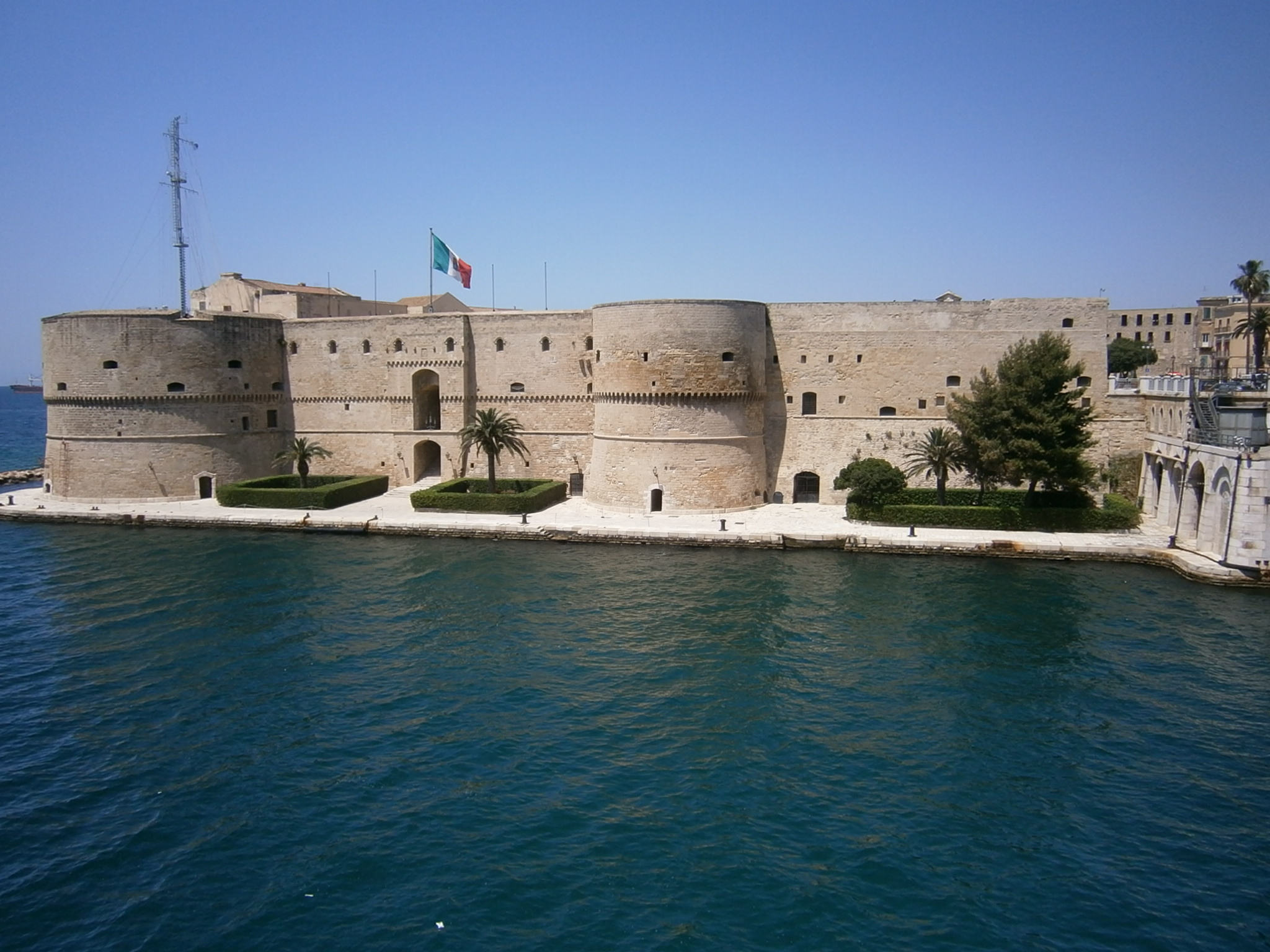
Aragonese Castle of Taranto, built at the behest of Ferrante

Under Ferrante, the very rich royal library founded by Alfonso in Castel Capuano continued to grow at an impressive rate, thanks to purchases, gifts and the confiscation of the collections of the rebel barons.

The use of Neapolitan as the official language of the Kingdom promoted in the court the fashion of a poetry in which the cultured and the popular tradition merged, in a way not unlike what happened in Florence with Lorenzo de 'Medici. This culture also showed more accessible outside of court, spreading the literacy among the nobility and encouraging the growth of a popular literature that finds its best example in the Rookie of Masuccio Salerno.

The art for which Ferrante showed real enthusiasm, and in which his tastes were closest to those of Alfonso, was music : he continually sought out singers educated at the Burgundy school; expert organ builders received a warm welcome and in the early seventies Johannes Tinctoris arrived in Naples to complete the array of talents active in the court chapel and to develop the tradition of secular polyphony, so that the Neapolitan city excelled over the whole Italy for most of the century. Johannes Tinctoris, who defined himself "chaplain and musician of the king of Sicily", performed important functions in the service of Ferrante: chaplain cantor (archicapellanus), instrumentalist of ribeca and vihuela de arco (later known as viola da gamba ), tutor, composer and legal counsel. Tinctoris had an intellectually prominent role at court and in October 1487 he was sent to Northern Europe to hire new singers for the royal chapel. Due to his excellent knowledge of languages and law, King Ferrante also ordered him to draw up an Italian translation of the articles of the Order of the Golden Fleece (Articuli et ordinatione of the Order of the Golden Fleece).

Furthermore, Ferrante established in Naples the first musical school in Italy and one of the first in Europe, which involved the major musicians of the time such as: Bernhard Hykaert, the aforementioned Tinctoris, Guglielmo Guarnier and Franchino Gaffurio, who from 1475 to 1478 covered the position of Master of the Chapel of the Royal Palace. In this period the works of Greek musical treatises such as Aristoxenus, author of the fundamental Elementa harmonica and Elementa rhytmica, Aristide Quintiliano, author of a De musica, fundamental for the in-depth treatment of the subject and " Institutio oratoria ", in which the author parallels rhetorical art, with the musical composition, which is able to arouse emotions, prodrome of what will be the theory of affects in the Neapolitan music school of the eighteenth century. This school founded by Ferrante was very important for the development of music in Italy but above all it determined the foundations of the nascent Neapolitan Music School.

His diplomacy was very expensive and to strengthen the finances, already proven by the patronage of Alfonso I, Ferrante introduced an austerity regime in the court and in the state apparatus, to facilitate commercial traffic for his vassals, he opened it no less in east that in the west, encouraged businesses and traders by launching a series of initiatives aimed at increasing trade exchanges with Venice, Pisa and Spain; it favored the migration from the countryside to the city and allowed the immigration of numerous Jews expelled from Spain through the decree of the Alhambra issued by the Catholic kings. One of the refugees, Don Isaac Abrabanel, even received a position at the Neapolitan court of Ferrante which he also held under his successor, Alfonso II. Overall, the Neapolitan population increased rapidly and it was necessary to expand the city walls.

Among the many graces and wide privileges granted to Brindisi, he also gave her, for the loyalty shown to him, the privilege of minting coins, a privilege that he also granted to Capua, Chieti, Sulmona and L'Aquila. He ordered the latter to strike coins not different from those of the Neapolitan mint.

During his reign, the Royal House of Naples had nothing to envy in terms of splendor to the Courts of the major princes of Europe, given that Ferrante wanted to increase and introduce many arts, such as the art of silk weaving, introduced in Naples by Roger II of Sicily, the art of working wool in 1480, the art of goldsmiths, and the art of weaving gold drapes and brocades. To perfect it, he called Marino di Cataponte and Florence from Venice Francesco di Nero, paying them generously.

== Museum of Mummies ==
Historian Jacob Burckhardt in his Die Cultur der Renaissance in Italien described Ferrante's recreational activities as follows: "his pleasures were of two kinds: he liked to have his opponents near him, either alive in well-guarded prisons, or dead and embalmed, dressed in the costume which they wore in their lifetime." Fearing no one, he would take great pleasure in conducting his guests on a tour of his prized "museum of mummies". Indeed, Ferdinand had a novel way of dealing with his enemies. After having them murdered, he had their bodies mummified. He kept them in a private ‘black museum’, dressed in the clothes that they had worn in life. If he suspected one of his subjects of plotting against him, he took him to visit the 'museum’ as a deterrent.

== Marriages and children ==
From his first wife Isabella of Clermont he had six children:

- Alfonso II known as "the Squinter" (4 November 1448 - 18 December 1495), king of Naples from 1494 to 1495
- Eleanor (22 June 1450 - 11 October 1493), wife of Ercole I d'Este, Duke of Ferrara
- Frederick I (October 16, 1451 - November 9, 1504), king of Naples from 1496 to 1501
- Giovanni (25 June 1456 - 17 October 1485), cardinal
- Beatrice (14 September or 16 November 1457 - 23 September 1508), queen of Hungary as wife of Matthias Corvinus and queen of Bohemia, and Hungary as wife of Vladislaus II of Hungary;
- Francesco (December 16, 1461 - October 26, 1486), Duke of Sant'Angelo and Marquis of Bisceglie

From his second wife Joanna of Aragon he had two children:

- Giovanna known as "Giovannella" (20 April 1479 - 27 August 1518), queen of Naples as consort of her nephew Ferdinand II of Naples and subsequently briefly viceregina of Naples.
- Carlo (1480 - 26 October 1486), dead of typhus.

From concubine Diana Guardato:

- Maria (1440 - 1460), wife of Antonio Todeschini Piccolomini, Duke of Amalfi
- Giovanna (1445 - 1501), wife of Leonardo Della Rovere (1445-1475), Duke of Arce and Sora;
- Ilaria, wife of Giovanni del Tevere, prefect of Rome and nephew of Sixtus IV;
- Enrico (... - 1478), eldest son and Marquis of Gerace

From Marchesella Spitzata, sister of his chaplain and his equerry:

- Maria (1451 - ...).

From Piscicella Piscicelli:

- Cesare, Marquis of Santa Agata;
- Alonso d'Aragona (1460–1510), designated heir to Queen Charlotte of Cyprus, who was either married or engaged to Charla of Lusignan (1468 – in prison in Padua, 1480), a natural daughter of Charlotte's half brother, King James II of Cyprus. His young bride was captured by the queen's opponents and died in captivity shortly before her twelfth birthday. After her death, a marriage was proposed between him and Catherine Cornaro, but the plan came to nothing due to the interference of the Republic of Venice. Instead, Charlotte ceded her claims to the Cypriotic throne to her cousin, Charles I of Savoy, in 1485. Alonso was made bishop of Chieti on 28 February 1488 and kept this office until 16 November 1496.

From Eulalia Ravignano:

- Maria Cecilia, first wife of Gian Giordano Orsini, Lord of Bracciano;
- Lucrezia (according to other sources daughter of Diana Guardato), wife of Onorato III Caetani, duke of Traetto, prince of Altamura and count of Fondi.

Controversial is the situation relating to the children of Giovannella Caracciolo, the most beautiful of the daughters of Count Giacomo di Brienza, whom Ferrante obtained by force in 1472 through agreements with his father, but without the consent of either the mother or the person directly concerned. Giovannella, who must have been very young (she is defined as a puta, that is a child), remained at court for about two years. The Successes et tragic love by Silvio Ascanio Corona reports that she gave three children to Ferrante:

- Fernando de Aragón, 1st Duke of Montalto, who for others is the son of Diana Guardato;
- Maria, wife of Alfonso d'Avalos, Marquis of Vasto;
- Giovanna, wife of Ascanio Colonna.

Other sources say she is the mother of Cesare and Alfonso, whom the Successes indicate instead as children of Piscicella, as well as of Ferdinando, count of Arena and Stilo, and Leonora. It is clear that she could not be the mother of all of these, in relation both to her young age, to the short time spent at court, and to the well-known use of contraceptives that Alfonso had procured for his father from the East.

== In mass culture ==
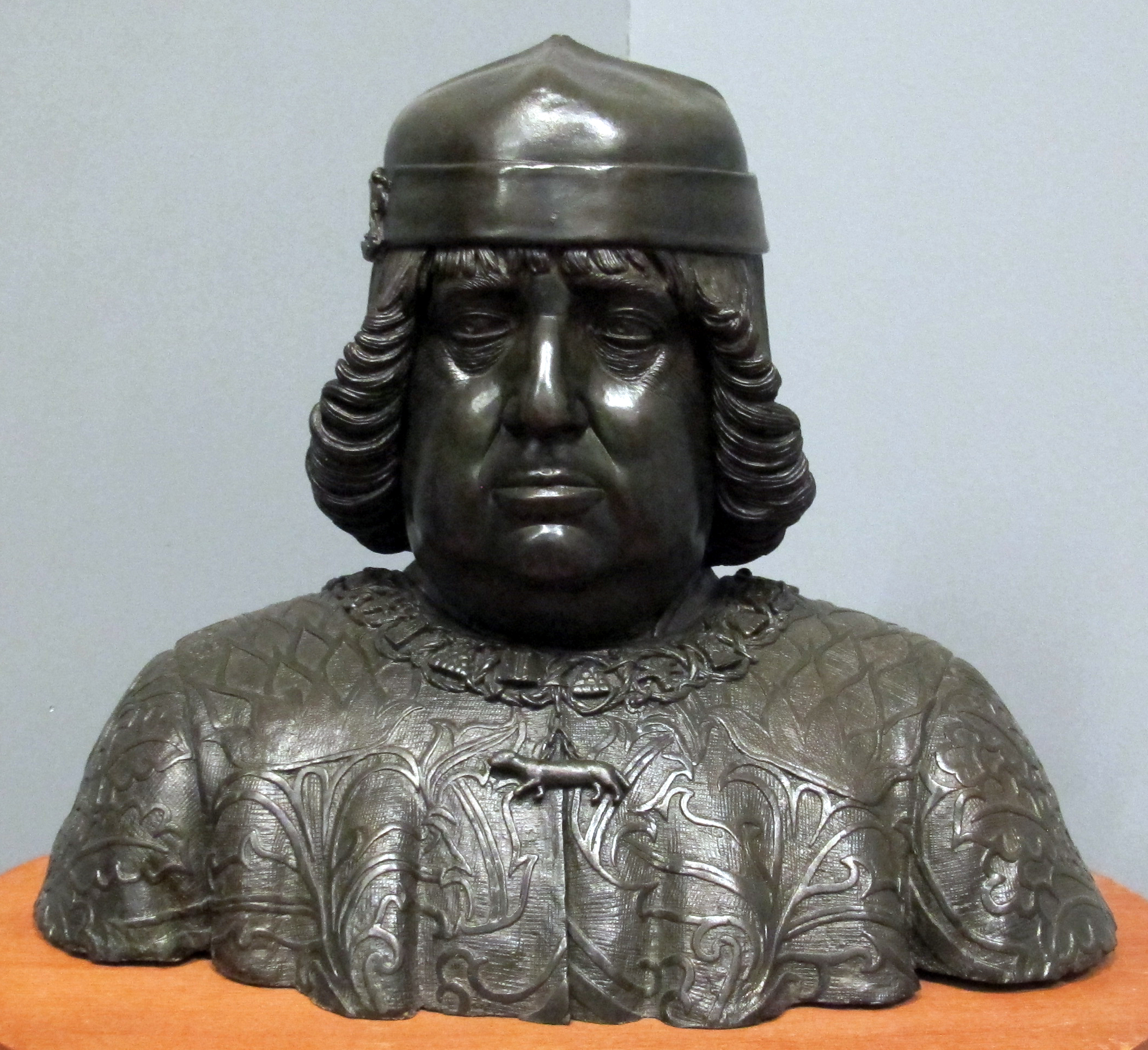
Guido Mazzoni, Bust of King Ferrante of Aragon with the collar of the Order of the Ermine, instituted by him, Capodimonte Museum, Naples, 1489-1492

=== Literature ===
Ferrante is the protagonist:

- of the homonymous tragedy "Ferrante" by Giuseppe Campagna (1842), inspired by the final events of the famous Conspiracy of the Barons of 1485–1486.

of the novel " Of the forbidden amor - Neapolitan history of the fifteenth century " by Dino Falconio (2014), inspired by the alleged incestuous relationship that Ferrante would have entertained with his sister Eleonora. He also appears as a character in the novel " The Duchess of Milan" by Michael Ennis (1992), as well as in comics:

- Gli 800 Martiri - La presa di Otranto, by Franco Baldi and Giovanni Ballati (2017).
- Sanseverino - Storia di una grande famiglia italiana, by Giuseppe Rescigno and Antonio Pannullo (1994).

=== Television ===
- In the 2011–2013 Canadian television series The Borgias, Ferrante is played by actor Joseph Kelly.
- In the 2013–2015 British-American fantasy series Da Vinci's Demons, Ferrante is played by British actor Matthew Marsh.
- In the 2016–2019 Anglo-Italian television series Medici, Ferrante is played by British actor Ray Stevenson.

== Honorous ==
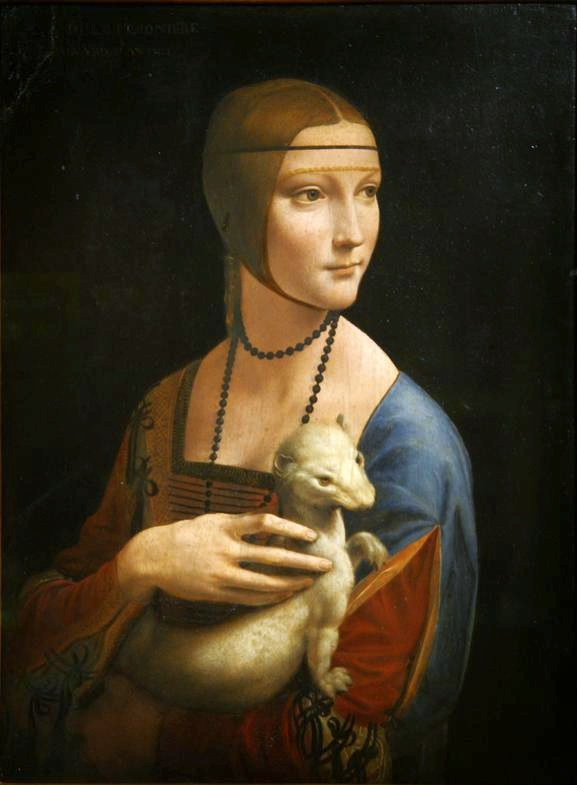
Leonardo da Vinci, Lady with an Ermine, Museo Czartoryski, Cracovia, 1488–1490. The lady portrayed is Cecilia Gallerani, lover of Ludovico il Moro, duke of Milan, who in 1488 was awarded the Order of the Ermine. The painting can be considered a reference to the honor bestowed on him

On 29 September 1465 Ferrante founded the famous Order of the Ermine, which was awarded to the same sovereign, his son Alfonso, his nephew Ferrandino and many other important personalities, such as Ercole I d'Este, Galeazzo Maria Sforza, Ludovico il Moro, Federico from Montefeltro and Charles I of Burgundy.

=== National ===
Knight of the Order of the Ermine

=== Foreign ===
Knight of the Order of the Dragon - ribbon for ordinary uniform

Knight of the Order of the Dragon

Knight of the Order of the Garter - ribbon for ordinary uniform

Knight of the Order of the Garter
"Invested by Edward IV of England"
— 1463

Knight of the Order of the Golden Fleece - ribbon for ordinary uniform

Knight of the Order of the Golden Fleece
"Invested by Charles the Bold "
— 1473

== Works ==
- Ferdinando d'Aragona. Francesco Del Tuppo (ed.). Esortazione di insorgere contro i baroni ribelli. Naples.
- A collection of letters in Latin was published under his name in 1585 with the title Epistole Militari or rather Regis Ferdinandi et aliorum Epistolae ac Orationes utriusque militiae.
- A theological-dogmatic pamphlet is attributed to him: De causis quare Deus fecit peccabile genus humanum.

== Numismatics ==
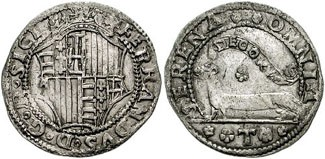
Neapolitan coin (Armellino) of Ferrante

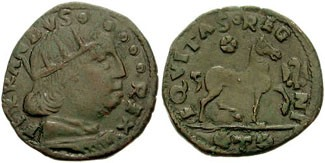
Cavallo (neapolitan coin) of Ferrante

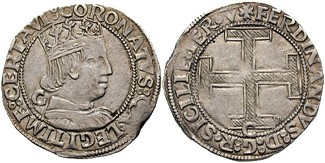
Neapolitan Coronato of Ferrante, 1458

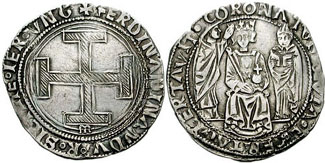
Neapolitan Coronato of Ferrante, 1462

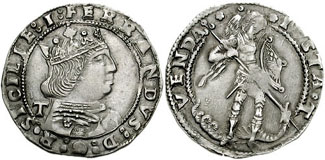
Neapolitan Coronato of Ferrante, 1488

== Sources ==
- Bartlett, Kenneth R. (2013). A Short History of the Italian Renaissance. University of Toronto Press. ISBN 978-1-4426-0014-0.
- Hill, George (1948). A History of Cyprus. Vol. The Frankish Period, 1432–1571. Cambridge University Press.
- Perez, Pablo A. (January–June 2013). "Los Hijos "De Madre no Conocida" en Chiloé (Siglos XVIII-XIX)". Revista de Historia de América (in Spanish). 148. Pan American Institute of Geography and History.
- Williams, George L. (1998). Papal Genealogy: The Families and Descendants of the Popes. McFarland & Company.
- Alan Ryder (1996). "Fernando I (Ferrante) d'Aragona, re di Napoli". Dizionario Biografico degli Italiani (in Italian). Rome: Institute of the Italian Encyclopaedia. OCLC 883370.
- Giovanni Pontano (1509). De bello Neapolitano. Naples.
- Giovanni Antonio Summonte (1601). Historia della città e Regno di Napoli. Naples.
- Ernesto Pontieri (1969). ESI (ed.). Per la storia di Ferrante I d'Aragona re di Napoli. Naples.
- Emilio Nunziante (1898). I primi anni di Ferdinando d'Aragona e l'invasione di G. d'Angio: 1458-1464. Naples.
- Biancardi, Bastian (1737). F. Pitteri (ed.). Le vite de Re di Napoli, Raccolte succintamente con ogni accuratezza. Naples.
- Morelli, Nicolò (1825). N. Gervasi (ed.). Biografia de Re Di Napoli: Ornata de Loro Rispettivi Ritratti, Volume 10. Naples.
- Nicolò Morelli (1849). G. Nobile (ed.). Vite de Re di Napoli, con lo stato delle scienze, delle arti, della navigazione, del commercio e degli spettacoli sotto ciascun sovrano: Volumi 1-2. Naples.
- Scipione Mazzella (1594). Ad istanza di Gioseppe Bonfandino. Si vendono all'insegna della Corona (ed.). Le Vite dei Re di Napoli. Con le loro effigie dal naturale. Del Sig. Scipione Mazzella Napolitano. Ove ordinatamente si raccontano le successioni, le guerre, ei gesti loro, e delle cose più degne altroue ne' medesimi tempi auuenute. Con la denominazione degli huomini illustri . Naples.
- Vincenzo Buonsignori (1856). G. Landi (ed.). Storia della repubblica di Siena esposta in compendio:Volume 2. Siena.
- Nicola Ratti (1794). Presso Il Salomoni (ed.). Della famiglia Sforza:Volume 2. Rome.

Ferdinand I of Naples House of Trastámara Born: 2 June 1423 Died: 25 January 1494
Regnal titles
Preceded by Alfonso I	King of Naples; 1458–1494	Succeeded by Alfonso II
