= Davalos =

Davalos or Dávalos is a Spanish surname. Notable people with the surname include:

- Alexa Davalos (born 1982), American actress
- Armando Dávalos (born 1957), Brazilian footballer
- Armando Hart Dávalos (born 1930), Cuban politician and Communist leader
- David Davalos (born 1965), American playwright
- Dominique Davalos (born 1965), American rock musician
- Doug Davalos (born 1970), men's basketball coach at Texas State University
- Elyssa Davalos (born 1959), American television and film actress
- Francisco Rivera Dávalos (born 1994), Mexican footballer
- Íñigo Dávalos (? — 1484), Castilian general
- Jorge Dávalos (born 1957), Mexican football manager
- José Dávalos (born 1927), Mexican Olympic boxer
- Juan Alonso de Cuevas y Dávalos (1590 — 1665), Archbishop of Mexico
- Juan Manuel Dávalos (born 1953), Mexican politician
- Karina Subía Dávalos (born 19??), Ecuadorian politician
- Katherine Dávalos Ortega (born 1934), 38th Treasurer of the United States
- Laura Guzmán Dávalos (born 1961), Mexican mycologist
- Liliana M. Dávalos, Colombian evolutionary biologist
- María Estefanía Dávalos y Maldonado (1725 — 1801), Ecuadorian sculptor and painter
- Pedro Betancourt Dávalos (1858 — 1933), Cuban revolutionary and politician
- Pelagio Antonio de Labastida y Dávalos (1816 — 1891), Mexican Roman Catholic prelate, lawyer, doctor of canon law and politician
- Richard Davalos (born 1930), American actor
- Rudy Davalos, American basketball coach and college athletics director
- Ruy López Dávalos (1357 — 1428), Count of Ribadeo
- Serafina Dávalos (1883 1957), first female lawyer in Paraguay
- Sergio Chávez Davalos (born 1974), Mexican politician
- Tomás Dávalos de Aragón (? — 1621), Patriarch of Antioch

== See also ==
- d'Avalos
- House of Ávalos (sometimes spelled Dávalos), Italian aristocratic family of Spanish origin
