= Niccolò Speciale =

Niccolò Speziale di Noto (Noto, c. 1380 – Noto, 13 Feb. 1444) was the Viceroy of Sicily in 1423–1424, and 1425–1432.

He was a personal Sicilian vassal of Aragonese Infante John of Aragon, Viceroy of Sicily from 1409 to 1416, Peter, infans of Aragón, Viceroy of Sicily from 1524 to 1525, and of the Infante Henry of Aragon.

He was a close associate of Sicilian military man and diplomat Ruggero Paruta. He was in good terms with famous Italian literary author Antonio Beccadelli. It is most likely, that both, Speziale and Beccadelli attended the wedding in 1420, of Infante John of Aragon to the widowed Navarrese Princess Blanche I of Navarre.

Aragonese power, centered on Sicilian-Spanish families, such as Ávalos or Davalos, Moncada, or Montcada, Cabrera, Cardona, Chiaramonte, Folch de Cardona, Aragón or Aragona, Requesens, Ximenez de Urrea, Luna, Centelles, Moncayo Pignatelli, Platamone, Caracciolo, Tagliacozzo, Corella, Paternò, and Ventimiglia.

Contemporary humanists and academicians were likely indebted to Speciale, such as Iovianus Pontanus and Neapolitan Jacopo Sannazaro, who influenced also Spanish poetry of the early Renaissance. Imperial Spain soldiers as Juan Boscàn, Garcilaso de la Vega and Jorge de Montemor, or Sicily based Gutierre de Cetina, (1520- Mexico, 1557), heavily linked since then to the study of sixteenth-century European culture.

A person of the same name was born in Noto, Sicily in the 13th century and published chronicles of the history of Sicily from the Sicilian Vespers in 1282 to the death of Frederick III of Sicily.
