= Costanza d'Avalos, Duchess of Francavilla =

Italian ruler

Costanza d'Avalos
- Duchess of Francavilla; Princess of Francavilla
- Born: 1460
- Died: 1541 (aged 80–81)
- Noble family: d'Avalos
- Spouse: Federico del Balzo (1477-1483)
- Father: Iñigo I d'Avalos
- Mother: Antonella d'Aquino

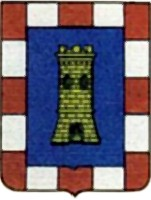
Coat of arms of the d'Avalos family

Costanza d'Avalos (1460–1541), Duchess of Francavilla, was an Italian ruler. She was the ruler of the Duchy of Francavilla between 1501 and 1541.

== Life ==
She was the daughter of Innico I d'Avalos of the Spanish d'Avalos family, count of Monteodorisio, and Antonella d'Aquino, heiress to the marquisate of Pescara. Her father had come to Italy with Alfonso V of Aragon in 1442.

She was given in marriage to Federico del Balzo, Prince of Altamura and Duke of Venosa, son of Pietro del Balzo and brother of the Queen of Naples, Isabella.

Mona Lisa (La Gioconda)

=== Duchess of Francavilla ===
After she was widowed without children, in 1483, King Frederick of Naples granted her the Duchy of Francavilla in 1501. She then followed her brother, Innico II d'Avalos, to Ischia, where he died in 1503.

Later that year, she defended Ischia against the French for four consecutive months, with great skill and bravery. Her services were rewarded by the settlement of the civil and military government of the island on the d'Avalos family, which power it retained until 1734, when its military command was transferred to Naples. She established her court at Ischia, which was frequented by many Neapolitan intellectuals of the period.

On 13 June 1507, she signed a marriage contract between her nephew Fernando Francesco d'Ávalos and Vittoria Colonna. The marriage took place on Ischia in December 1509. Vittoria, shortly after her marriage, spent her time on Ischia with Costanza.

In 1523 Charles V granted to Costanza the land which nowadays forms Pescara.

She died in 1541, after Charles V had given her the title of Princess of Francavilla.

== Literary influence ==
On Ischia, Costanza established a circle of literary friends around her, among which were the poet Vittoria Colonna, the wife of her nephew, Sannazaro, Paolo Giovio, Tansillo and Bernardo Tasso.

She also became a follower of Juan de Valdés and attended his lectures and discussions at his house in Chiaia.

== Legacy ==
Scholarly as well as amateur speculation has assigned the Mona Lisa's name to Costanza (among other women) - she was referred to as La Gioconda.
