= House of Ávalos =

Italian royal family that ruled parts of Italy

- Noble house
- Country: Spain (by birth); Italy (by settlement) Former countries: Kingdom of Castile; Kingdom of Aragon; Kingdom of Naples; Kingdom of Sicily; Two Sicilies; Kingdom of Italy
- Founder: Ruy López Dávalos
- Final ruler: Tommaso d'Avalos (until the abolition of feudalism)
- Titles: Prince of the Holy Roman Empire; Prince of Francavilla; Prince of Montesarchio; Prince of Isernia; Duke of Monte Bello; Duke of Monte Itilia; Duke of Monte Negro; Marquess of Vasto; Marquess of Pescara; Count of Monteodorisio
- Estates: Palazzo D'Avalos; Castello di Monteodorisio; Aragonese Castle
- Cadet branches: d'Avalos of Ceppaloni; d'Avalos of Montesarchio; d'Avalos of Troy

The House of Ávalos (also mentioned in sources as Dávalos, Ávalos, Ábalos, de Ávalos, Avalo, Abalón) is an aristocratic family of Spanish origin that also branched out in Italy starting from the 15th century as a result of the Aragonese conquest of Naples. The Italian branch of the family was the owner of numerous fiefs in the Kingdom of Naples until the abolition of feudalism and in the Duchy of Milan, including within it several notable figures in the political, military and ecclesiastical fields.

The d'Avalos family also had, in the person of Cesare Michelangelo d'Avalos, the title of Prince of the Holy Roman Empire and the right to mint coins. The family held the title (although it became substantially honorific in the mid-16th century) of Grand Chamberlain or Camerlengo, one of the Seven Great Offices of the Kingdom of Naples, for 195 years.

== History ==
The d'Avalos (in Spain the surname is more often mentioned as Dávalos and, sometimes, Abalón) would have, according to tradition, Visigothic origins. The first historically reliable information mentions the family in relation to a donation made by a certain Ximeno de Avalos to the benefit of the Royal Monastery of San Millán de la Cogolla dated 1162. Historian Esteban de Garibay y Zamalloa stated that Ximeno was a person of importance, a Knight with possessions in the village of Ábalos in the region of La Rioja. Various descendants of the family passed to Aragon and, then, to Andalusia, distinguishing themselves in the centuries-old military operations of the Reconquista.

The first Dávalos to rise to significant political importance was Lope Fernández Dávalos, who was also the first member of the family to settle in the Kingdom of Castile and León, during the reign of Ferdinand IV of Castile. Having distinguished himself in the conflicts against the Sultanate of Granada, he was appointed Alcaide (Governor) of Ubeda in 1334.

At the end of the 14th century, a great-grandson of Dávalos, Ruy López Dávalos became Constable of Castile as well as Adelantado mayor de Murcia y camarero mayor y gran valido of Henry III, King of Castile and León. Ruy López was the founder of several branches of the family, which spread to Toledo, Aragon, the region of Murcia, and Peru. A number of branches also were formed from Ruy's brother, Lope Ruiz (who married Mencía de Cervatos, a member of the minor nobility of Murcia; died in 1405). Among Lope's descendants we find important figures such as the ruler of Murcia Sancho Dávalos and Cardinal Gaspar de Ávalos de la Cueva.

=== Italian branch ===
Coat of arms of the d'Ávalos d'Aquino, adopted by the descendants of Innico I following his marriage to Antonella d'Aquino.

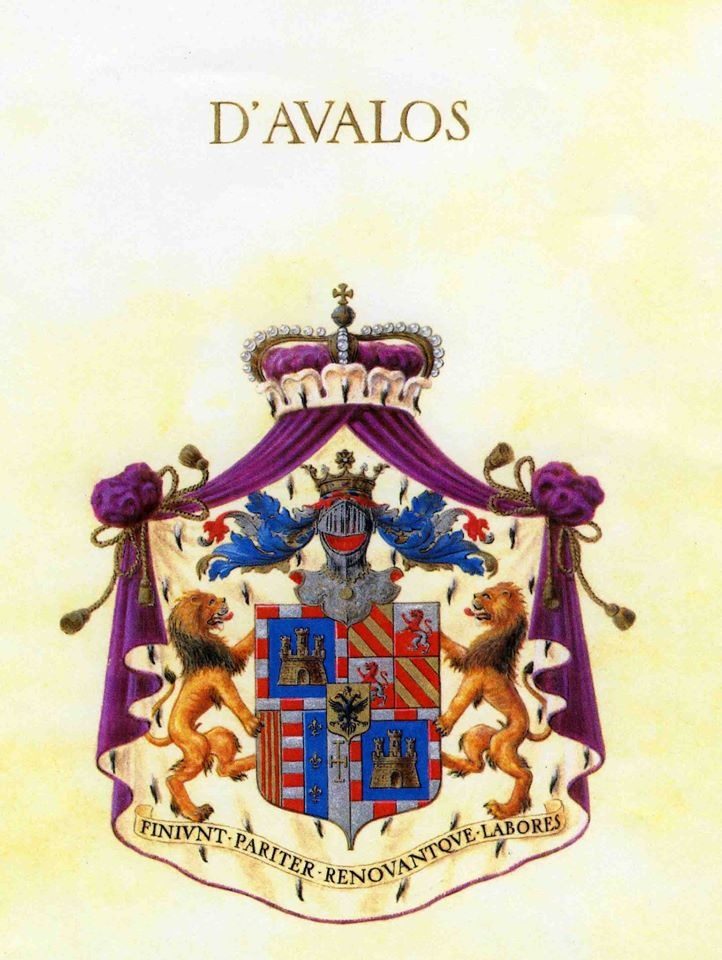
Coat of arms of Avalos d'Aquino d'Aragona, used by the descendants of Alfonso III d'Avalos following his marriage to Maria d'Aragona, daughter of Fernando de Aragón, 1st Duke of Montalto

The d'Ávalos family was one of the most important families of the Kingdom of Naples from the 15th century onwards. The brothers Iñigo, Alfonso and Rodrigo, sons of Ruy López Dávalos, Count of Ribadeo, arrived in the Italian peninsula following King Alfonso V of Aragon, who ascended to the throne of Naples in 1442.

The family was the owner of numerous fiefs (among the most important the Marquessates of Pescara and Vasto) and registered among the patricians of Naples of the Sedile di Nilo, then in the Libro d'Oro.

Innico I d'Avalos (1414–1484), favorite of Alfonso V of Aragon, married Antonella d'Aquino (d. 1493), the last descendant of the d'Aquino family; their heirs used the surname d'Avalos d'Aquino. Innico obtained the County of Monteodorisio and the Marquessate of Pescara from his wife. Alfonso II d'Avalos (1465–1495), the eldest of the couple's surviving sons, would have inherited the title of Marquess of Pescara, while Innico II d'Avalos (1467–1503), the couple's younger son, became the 1st Marquess of Vasto.

A collateral branch of the family was that of Ceppaloni, which originated from Rodrigo (son of Alfonso, brother of Innico I d'Avalos), to whom in 1529 the Emperor Charles V granted the fief of the village of the same name, previously a possession of the rebel Giacomo Antonio della Marra. Rodrigo married Feliciana de Gregorio, a noblewoman from Benevento, as his second wife, thus entering into possession of the rustic fief of Villafranca, in the County of Benevento. Rodrigo was succeeded by his firstborn Alfonso who married Costanza Caracciolo d'Aragona with whom he had various children, including Rodrigo who inherited the fief of Ceppaloni, sold in 1572 to the Coscia family.

This branch was also registered in the nobility of Benevento and became extinct at the beginning of the 17th century.

Alfonso II had an only son, Fernando Francesco d'Avalos (1490–1525), a leader, known for his leading role in the battle of Pavia and husband of Vittoria Colonna (c. 1490–1547). Fernando Francesco, however, had no children from this marriage. The Aragonese Castle of Ischia, owned by the d'Avalos family, was the seat of a cultural circle: Vittoria Colonna had married there and resided there from 1501 to 1536, together with her aunt Costanza, surrounded by the most prestigious artists of the time. Upon the death of Fernando Francesco, the title of Marquess of Pescara passed to his cousin, the only male child of Innico II, namely Alfonso III d'Avalos (1502–1546). The latter, also a renowned General, acquired the title of Knight of the Order of the Golden Fleece and was Governor of the Duchy of Milan from 1538 to 1546. Alfonso III's eldest son, Francesco Ferdinando d'Avalos (1530–1571), held important government positions, being appointed Governor of the Duchy of Milan in 1560 (a position he held until 1563) and Viceroy of Sicily in 1568. The main line of the family continued with Alfonso Félix d'Ávalos (1564–1593), an important military man, commander of the Spanish cavalry in the victorious Battle of Zutphen.

== Notable members ==
=== Marquesses of Pescara (1403–1862) ===
No.	Name	Period	Consort	Note
1	Cecco del Borgo	1403–1411	Antonella di Miro di Gragnano	Awarded the title of Marquess of Pescara (a newly created title in the Kingdom of Naples) in 1403.
2	Bernardo Gaspare d'Aquino	1443–1461	Beatrice Caetani of the Lords of Sermoneta	The title of Marquess of Pescara was recreated for Bernardo Gaspare on 26 February 1443 by Alfonso V of Aragon (by convention, since he was recognized as such by the new Aragonese dynasty, he was considered the 1st Marquess of Pescara even though the title had already been borne by his predecessor Cecco del Borgo; the Marquessate of Pescara was also at the time still among the possessions left for life to Antonella di Miro (d. 1455), widow of Perdicasso Barile (d. 1443)and grandmother of Bernardo Gaspare d'Aquino); son of Francesco d'Aquino (Count of Loreto and Satriano, Grand Seneschal (1438) and Chamberlain (1442) of the Kingdom of Naples) and Giovannella del Borgo (daughter and heir of Cecco del Borgo, Marquess of Pescara and Count of Monteodorisio).
3	Francesco Antonio d'Aquino	1461–c. 1471	Francesca Orsini	2nd Marquess of Pescara; son of predecessor; died prisoner of the Angevins in Loreto without issue.
4	Innico I d'Avalos	c. 1471–1484	Antonella d'Aquino (Note: Antonella d'Aquino was sister of the 2nd Marquess of Pescara and heir to the Marquessate of Pescara and the Counties of Loreto and Satriano.)	Becomes by marriage, upon the death of his brother-in-law, 3rd Marquess of Pescara, and Count of Monteodorisio; son of Ruy López Dávalos (d. 1428).
5	Alfonso II	1484–1495	Diana de Cardona	4th Marquess of Pescara; son of predecessor.
6	Fernando Francesco I	1495–1525	Vittoria Colonna	5th Marquess of Pescara; son of predecessor.
7	Alfonso III	1525–1546	Maria d'Aragona	6th Marquess of Pescara (title confirmed by Emperor Charles V on 22 July 1532), 2nd Marquess of Vasto, son of Innico II, 1st Marquess of Vasto, and cousin of his predecessor; Knight of the Order of the Golden Fleece from 1531.
8	Francesco Ferdinando	1546–1571	Isabella Gonzaga	7th Marquess of Pescara, 3rd Marquess of Vasto; son of predecessor; Knight of the Order of the Golden Fleece from 1555.
9	Alfonso Félix	1571–1593	Lavinia Feltria Della Rovere	8th Marquess of Pescara, 4th Marquess of Vasto; son of predecessor; Knight of the Order of the Golden Fleece from 1586
10	Innico III	1593–1632	Isabella d'Avalos (Note: Isabella d'Avalos (1593-1648) was the eldest daughter of predecessor, Alfonso Félix (her husband, Innico III, was also a first cousin of Alfonso Félix).)	Becomes, by marriage, 9th Marquess of Pescara and 5th Marquess of Vasto; son of Cesare d'Avalos, 1st Marquess of Padula; Knight of the Order of the Golden Fleece from 1606.
11	Ferdinando Francesco	1632–1648/65	Geronima Doria (Note: Geronima Doria (1612–1682) was the daughter of Andrea II Doria (1570-1612) and Giovanna Colonna.)	10th Marquess of Pescara, 6th Marquess of Vasto; died without issue.
12	Diego I	1648/87–1697	Francesca Carafa di Roccella (Note: Francesca Giulia Maria Carafa (1624–1692), was a daughter of Girolamo II Carafa, 2nd Prince of Roccella, and Diana Vettori.)	11th Marquess of Pescara (de jure from 1687), 7th Marquues of Vasto (from 1665), 1st Prince of Isernia (title created ex novo in 1644); brother of predecessor.
13	Ferdinando Francesco	1651–1672	Isabel Ana Sarmiento de los Cobos y Portocarrero (Note: Isabel Ana Sarmiento de los Cobos y Portocarrero was the fifth daughter of Manuel de los Cobos y Luna, 4th Marquess of Camarasa, and Isabel de Portocarrero y de Luna. They married in the Royal Alcázar of Madrid on 14 January 1672.)	12th Marquess of Pescara; Knight of the Order of the Golden Fleece from 1672; son of predecessor.
14	Diego	1672–1690		13th Marquess of Pescara; son of predecessor; died without issue.
15	Cesare Michelangelo	1697–1729	Ippolita d'Avalos di Troia (Note: Ippolita d'Avalos di Troia, was a daughter of John II d'Avalos, 2nd Prince of Troia. She was a cousin of Cesare Michelangelo.)	Appointed Prince of the Holy Roman Empire (in 1704) by Emperor Leopold I; becomes 14th Marquess of Pescara, 8th Marquess of Vasto, 2nd Prince of Isernia upon the death of his father Diego I; died without issue; Knight of the Order of the Golden Fleece from 1699.
16	Giovan Battista	1729–1749	Silvia Spinelli	15th Marquess of Pescara, 9th Marquess of Vasto, 6th Prince of Montesarchio, 4th Prince of Troia; Prince of the Holy Roman Empire; grandson of predecessor; died without issue.
17	Diego II	1749–1776	Eleonora d'Acquaviva	16th Marquess of Pescara, 10th Marquess of Vasto, 7th Prince of Montesarchio, 5th Prince of Troia; Grandee of Spain (confirmed by Ferdinand VI of Spain by Royal Decree 16 February 1749); Prince of the Holy Roman Empire; brother of predecessor.
18	Tommaso	1776–1806	Francesca Caracciolo	Last sovereign Marquess due to the abolition of feudalism; 17th Marquess of Pescara, 11th Marquess of Vasto, 8th Prince of Montesarchio, 6th Prince of Troia; Prince of the Holy Roman Empire; son of predecessor.
19	Ferdinando	1806–1841	Giulia Caetani	18th Marquess of Pescara, 12th Marquess of Vasto, 9th Prince of Montesarchio, 7th Prince of Troia; Prince of the Holy Roman Empire; died without issue; grandson of predecessor.
20	Alfonso V	1841–1862		19th Marquess of Pescara, 13th Marquess of Vasto, 10th Prince of Montesarchio, 8th Prince of Troia; Prince of the Holy Roman Empire; Grandee of Spain; Knight of the Grand Cross of the Order of St. Gregory the Great, of the Order of Saint Januarius, of the Order of Saint Joseph; Commander of the Order of Christ. Brother of predecessor; upon his death the main branch of the family became extinct.

== Gallery ==
=== Family members ===
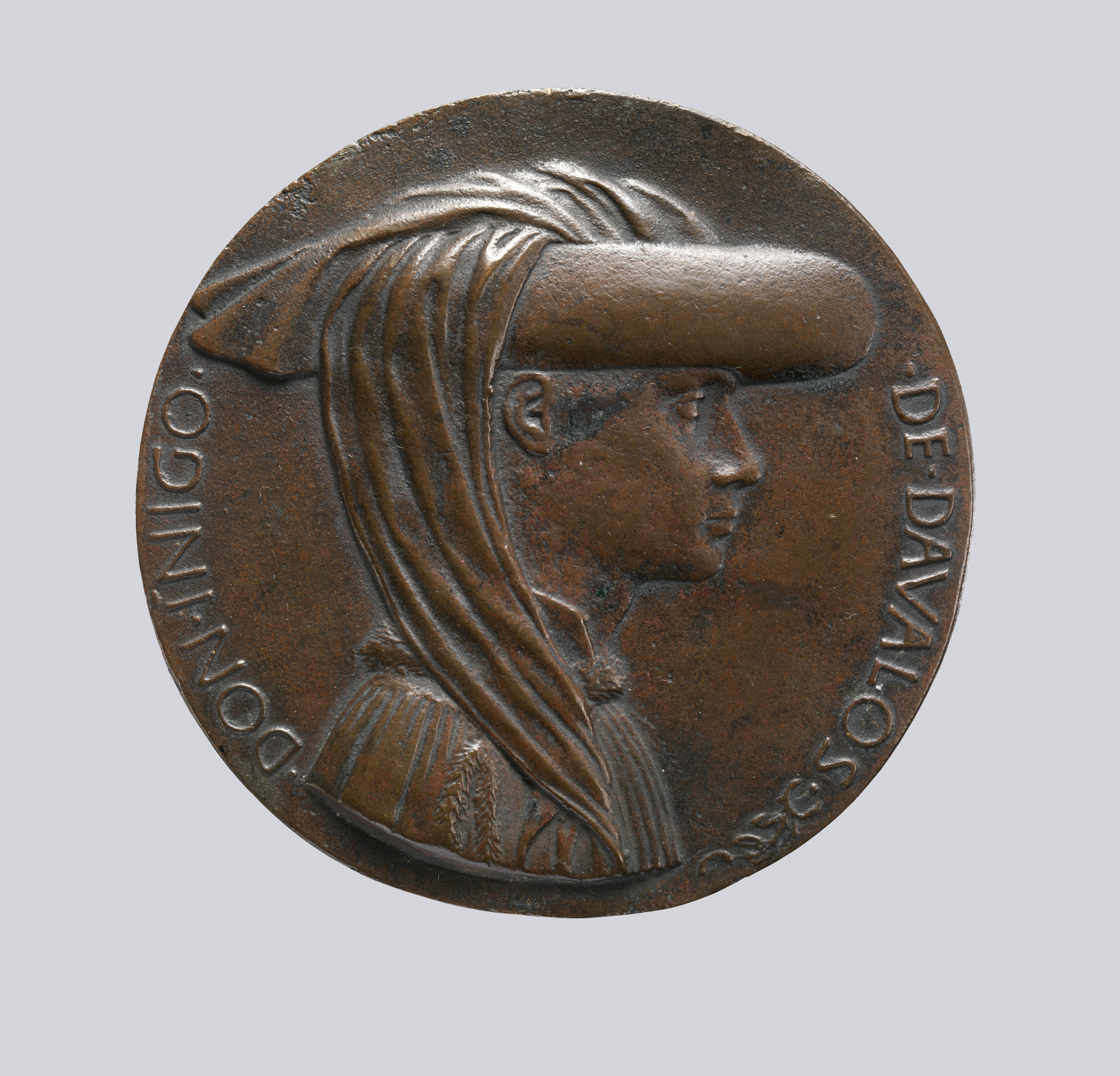
Medal of Inigo d'Avalos by Pisanello, from 1449.

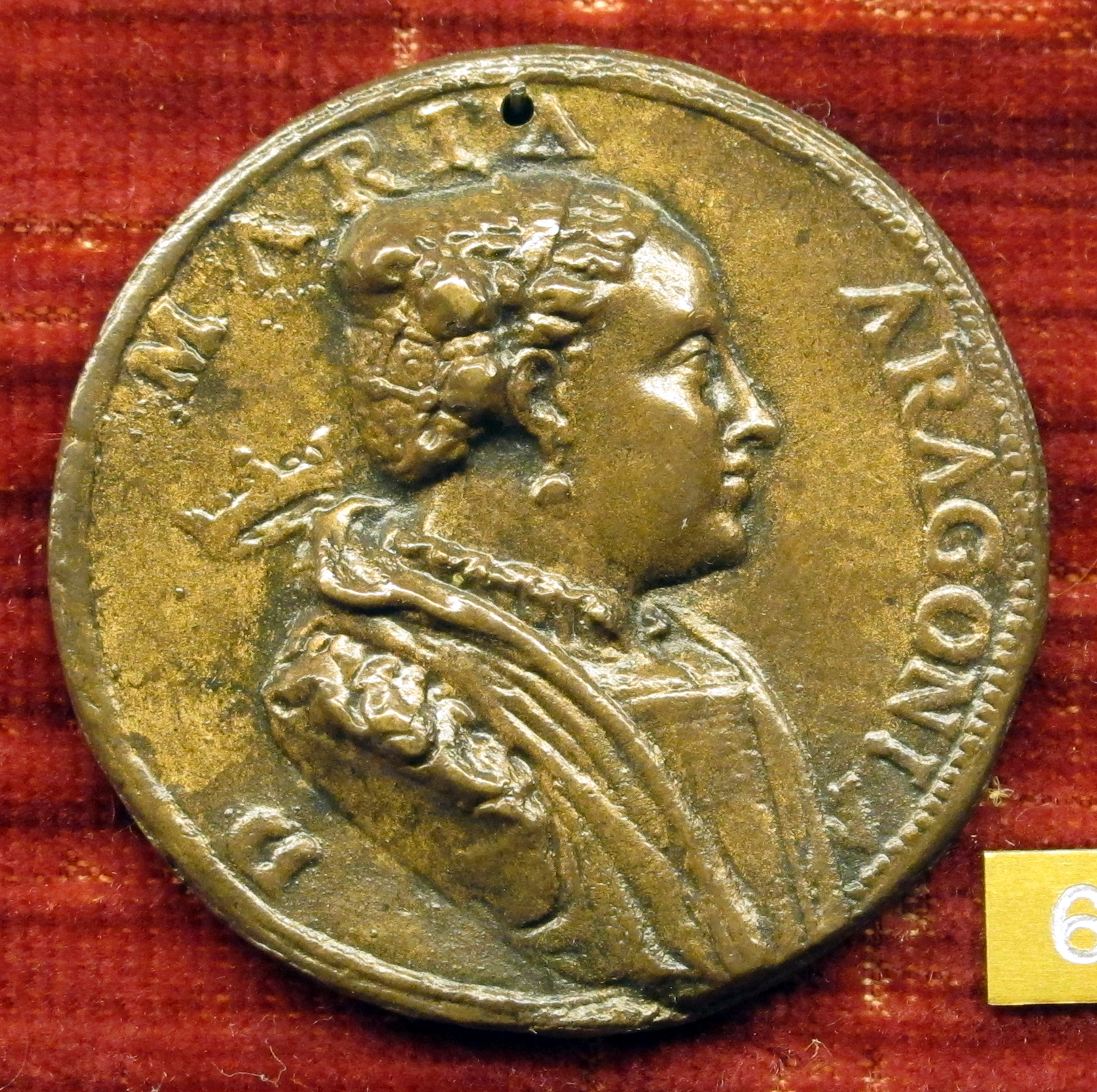
Medal of Maria d'Aragona, wife of Alfonso III d'Avalos

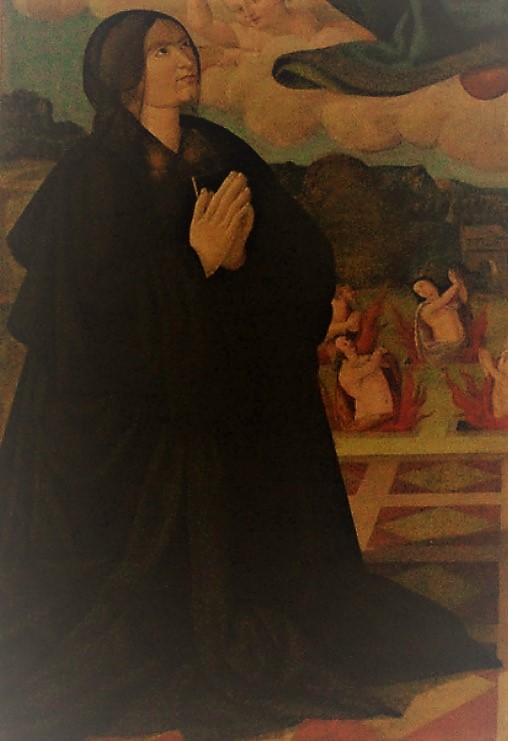
Painting on wood in the Convent of Sant'Antonio in Ischia depicting Costanza d'Avalos.

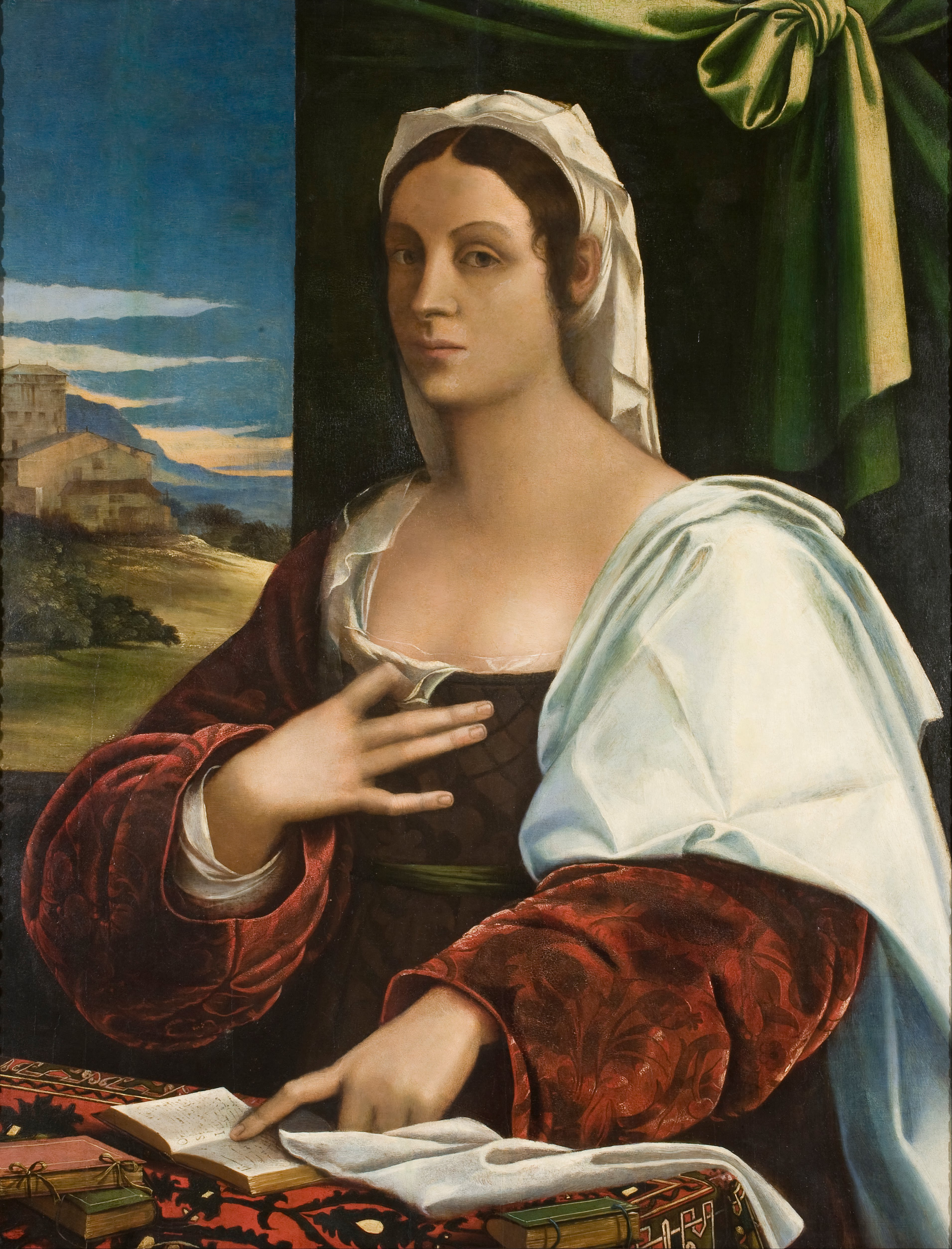
Vittoria Colonna, poet and patron, wife of Fernando Francesco d'Avalos, portrayed by Sebastiano del Piombo.

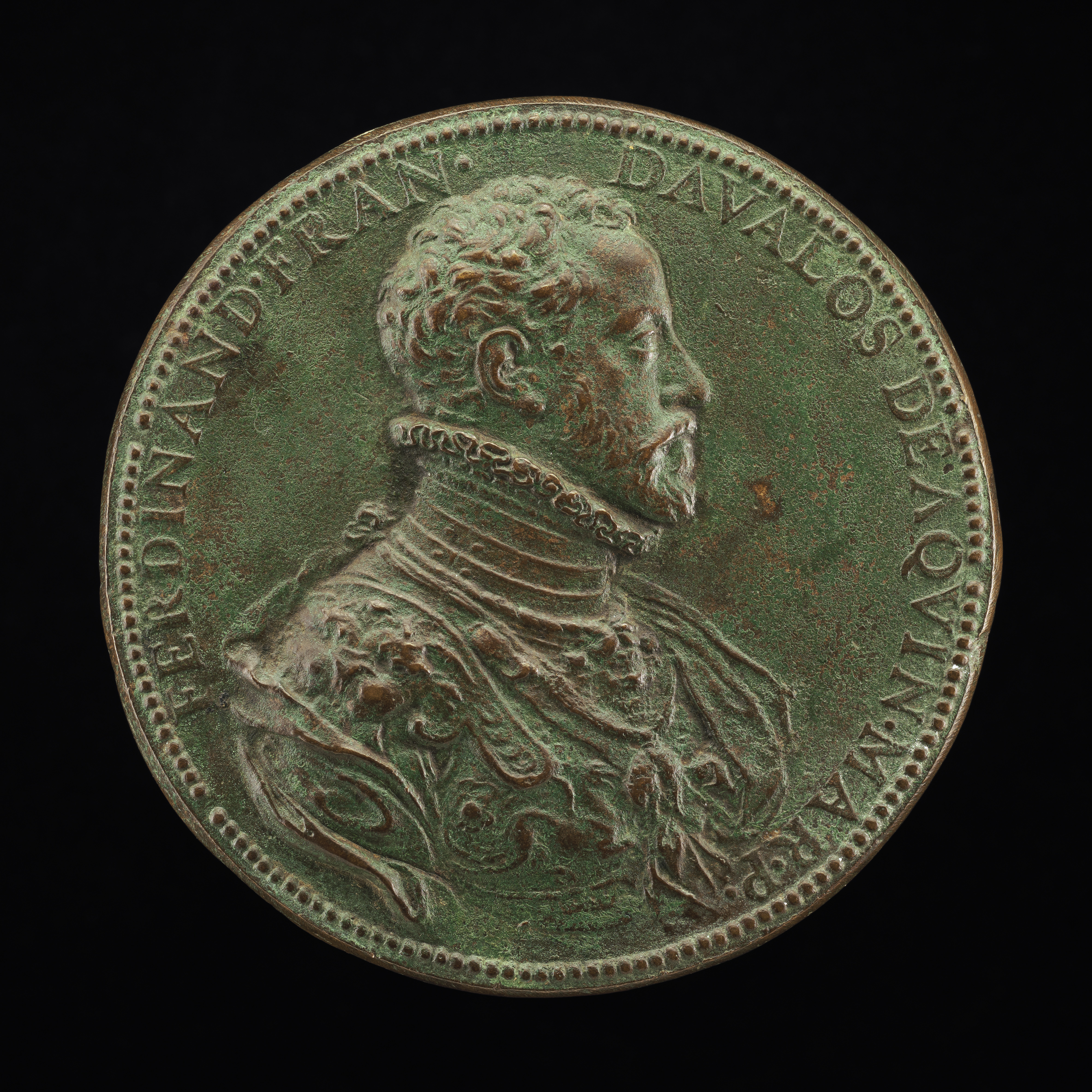
Commemorative medal of Francesco Fernando d'Avalos made in 1562 by Annibale Fontana. Part of the collection of Samuel Henry Kress.

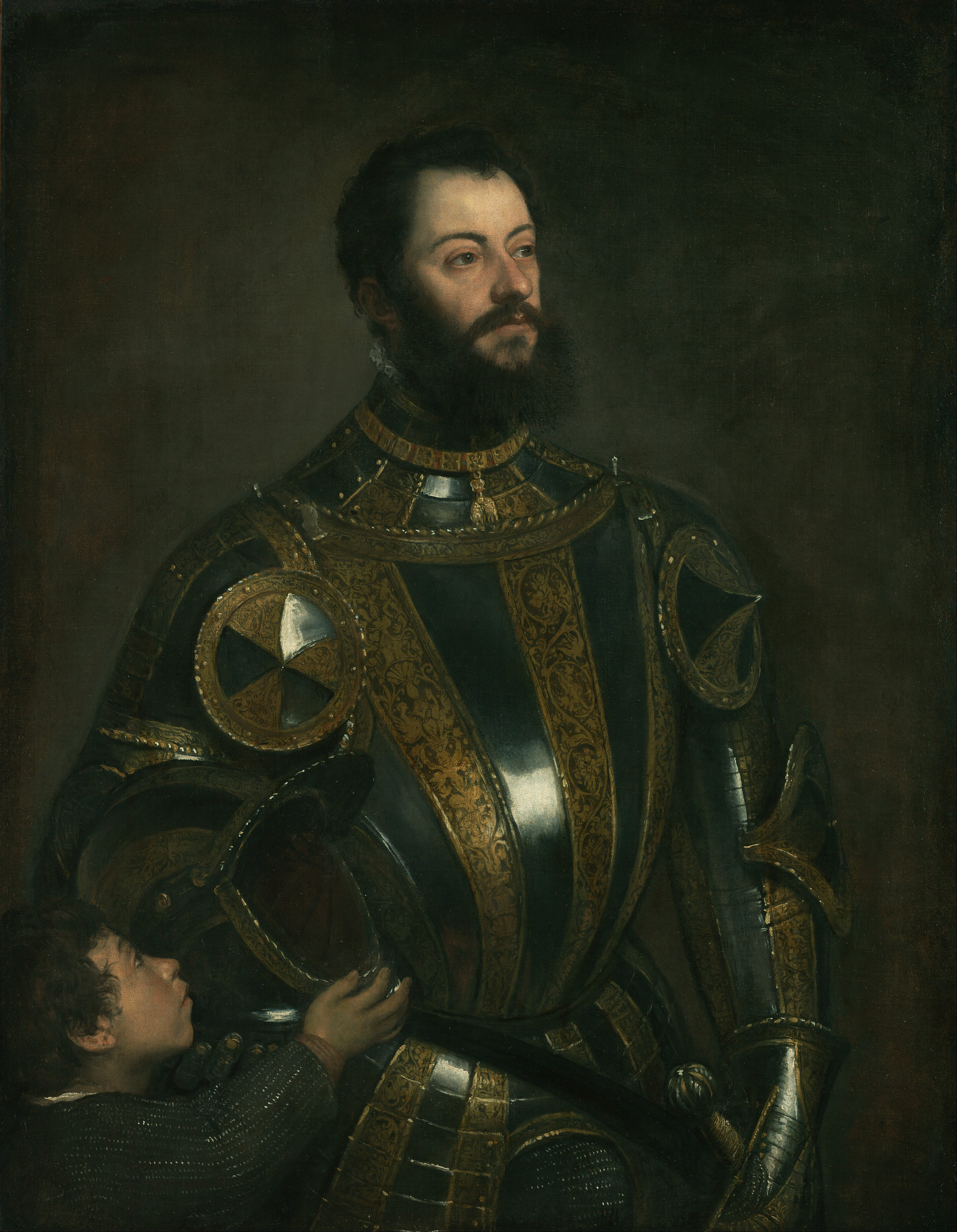
Portrait of Alfonso d'Avalos with a Page, painting by Titian, 1533, Getty Museum, Los Angeles

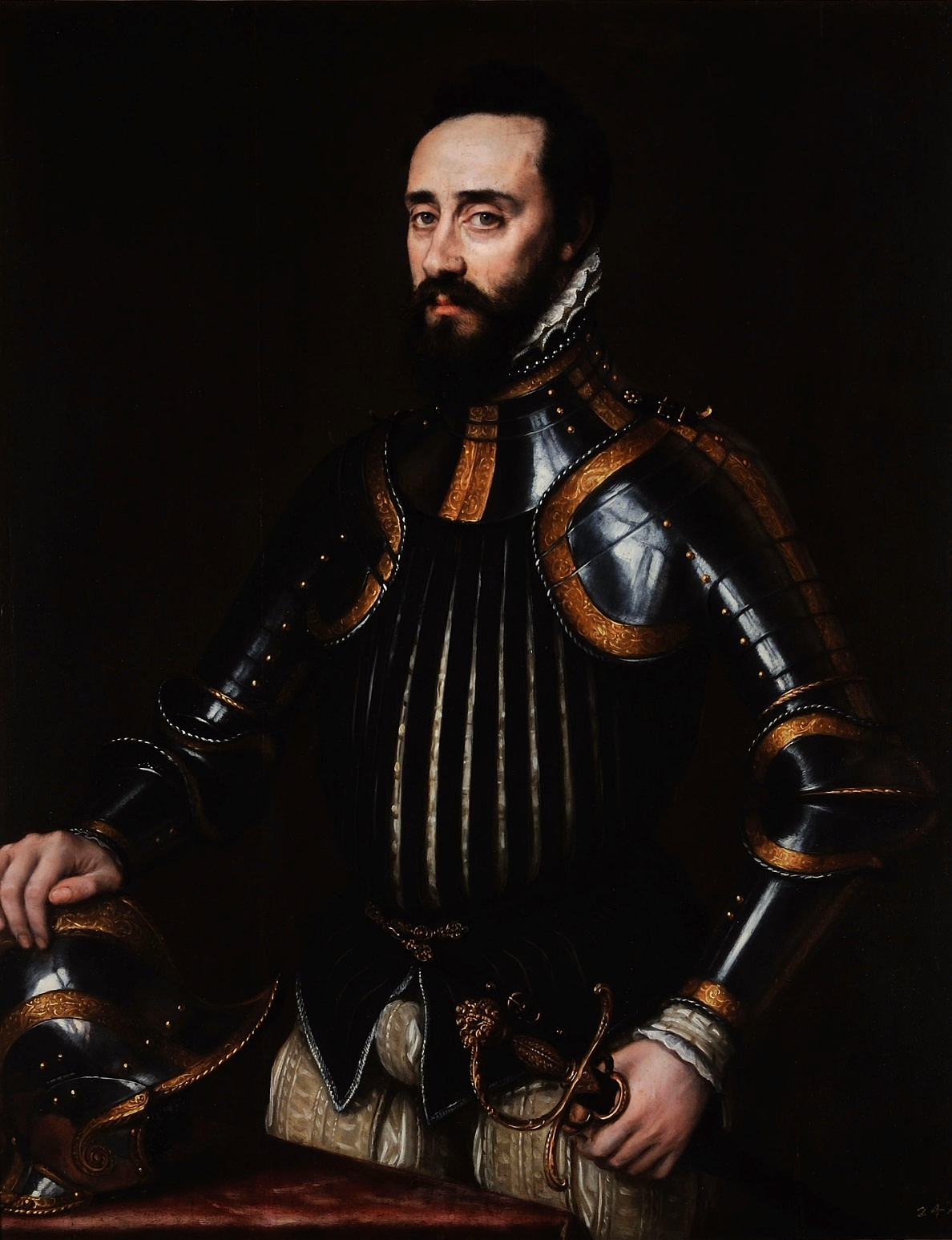
Alfonso III d'Avalos by Antonio Moro, Czartoryski Museum in Kraków.

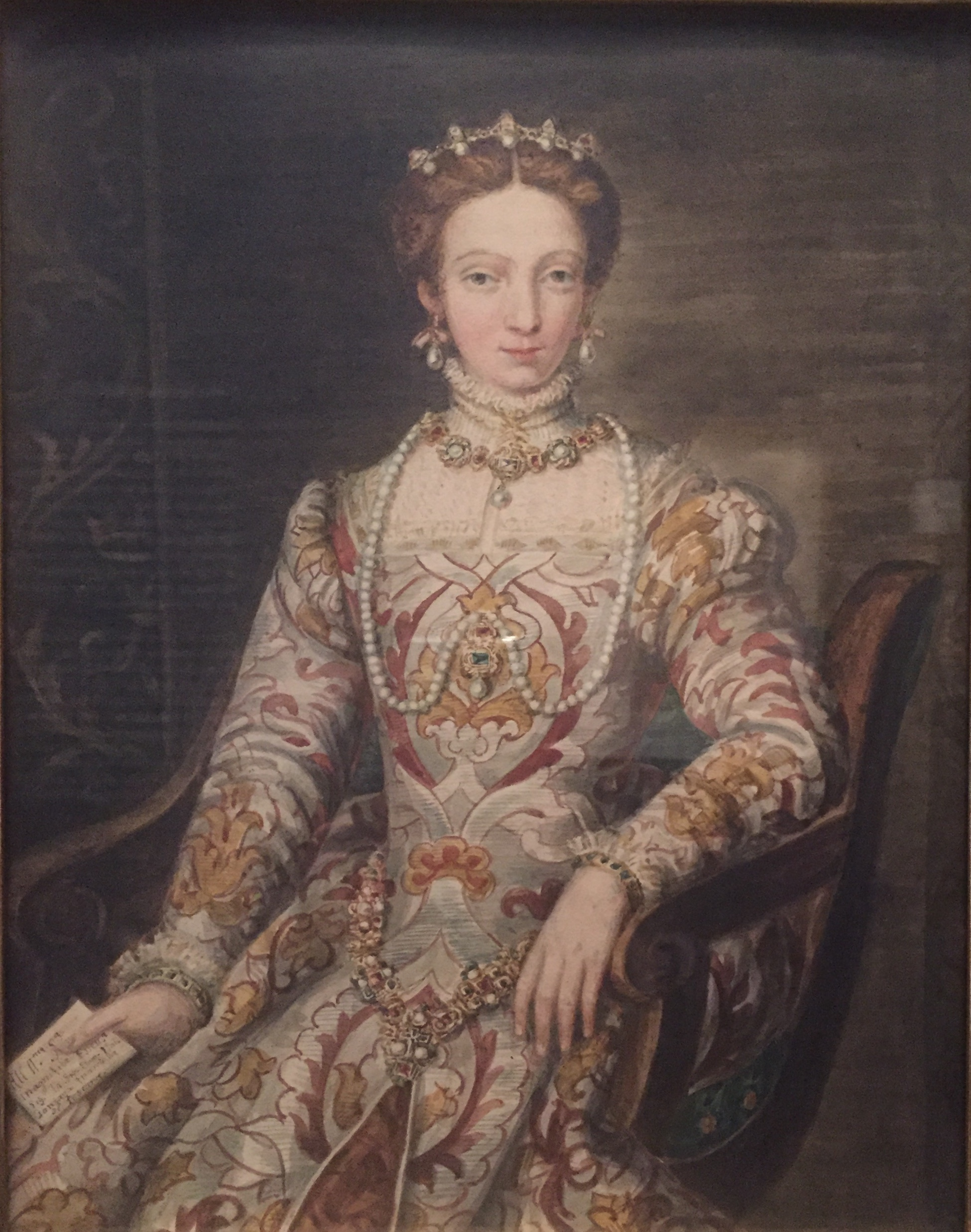
Anachronistic portrait of Isabella Gonzaga, wife of Francesco Ferdinando d'Avalos, by Valentín Carderera, 1831.

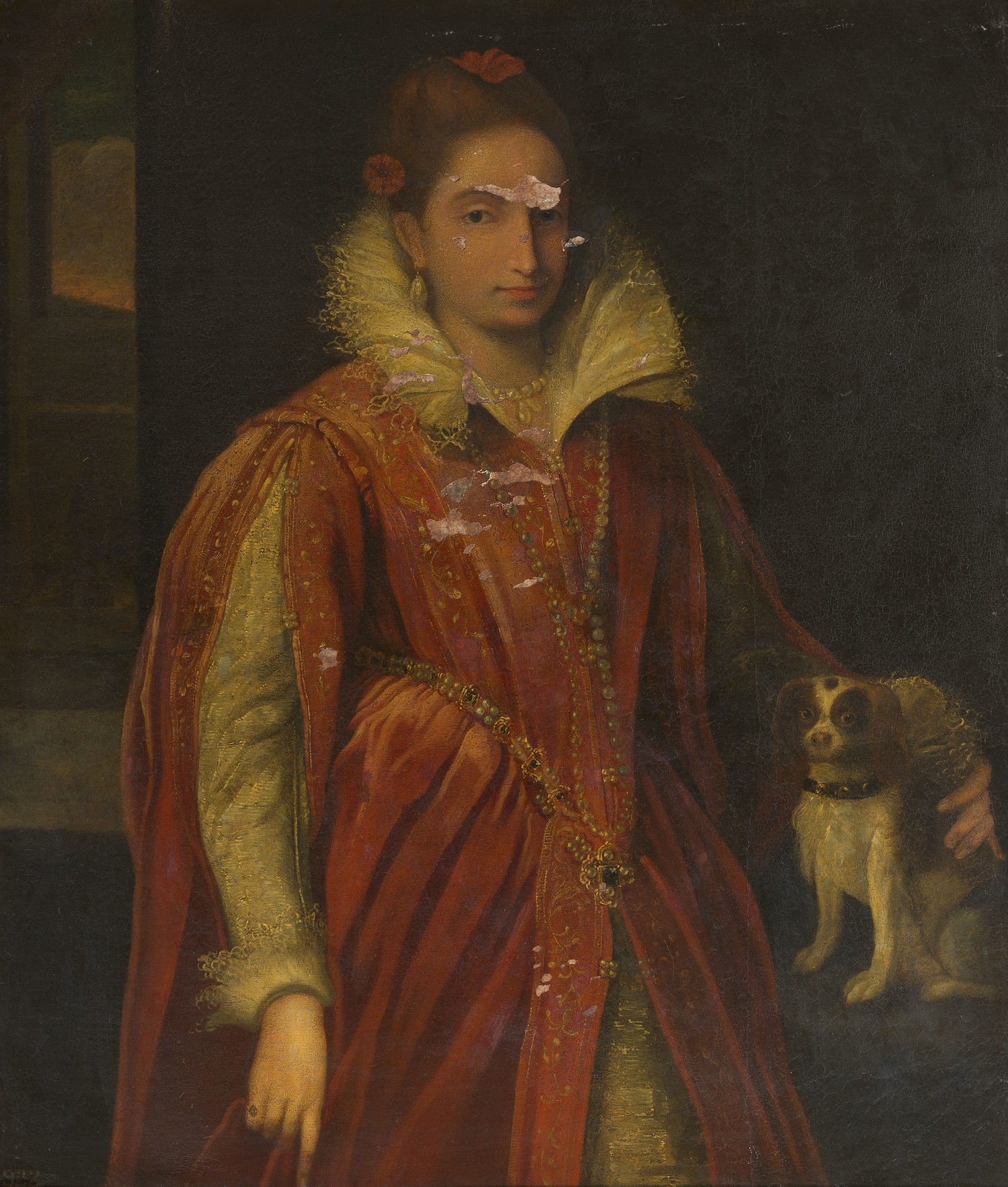
Portrait believed to be Lavinia Feltria Della Rovere, wife of Alfonso Félix d'Avalos, workshop of Federico Barocci (currently part of the Royal Collection).

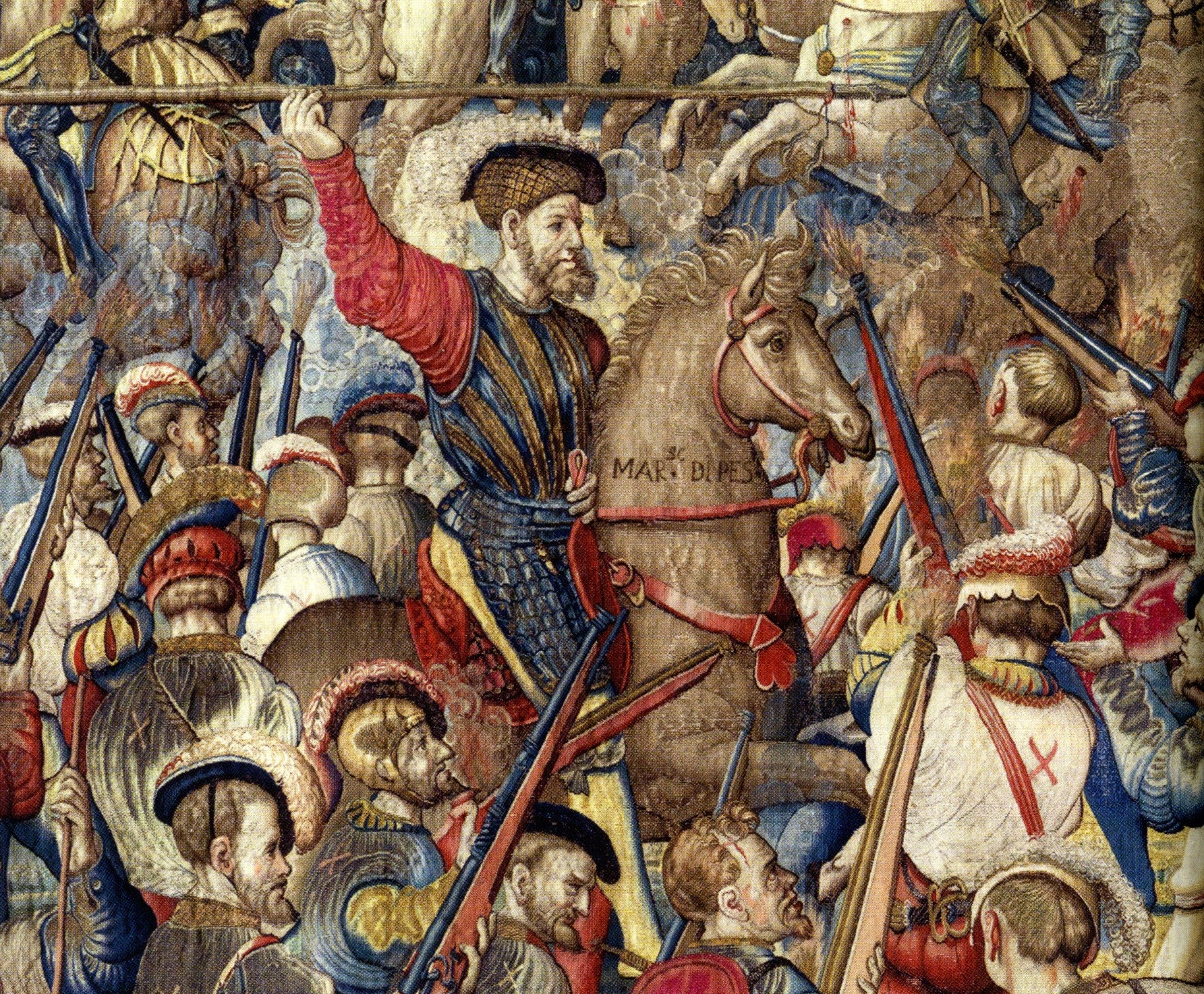
Fernando Francesco d'Avalos portrayed in the tapestries of the Battle of Pavia.

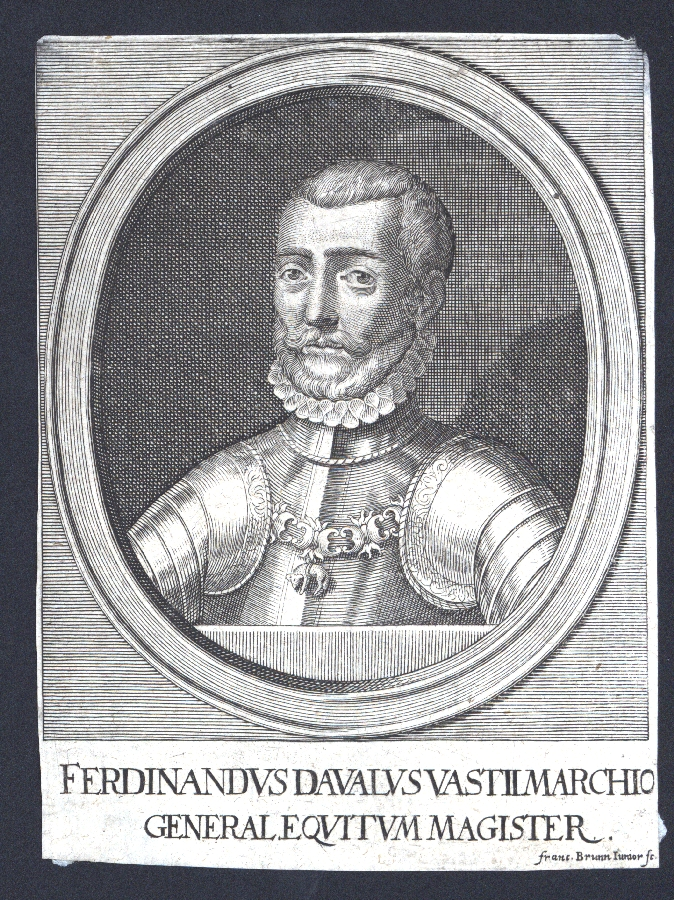
Print depicting Francesco Ferdinando d'Avalos.

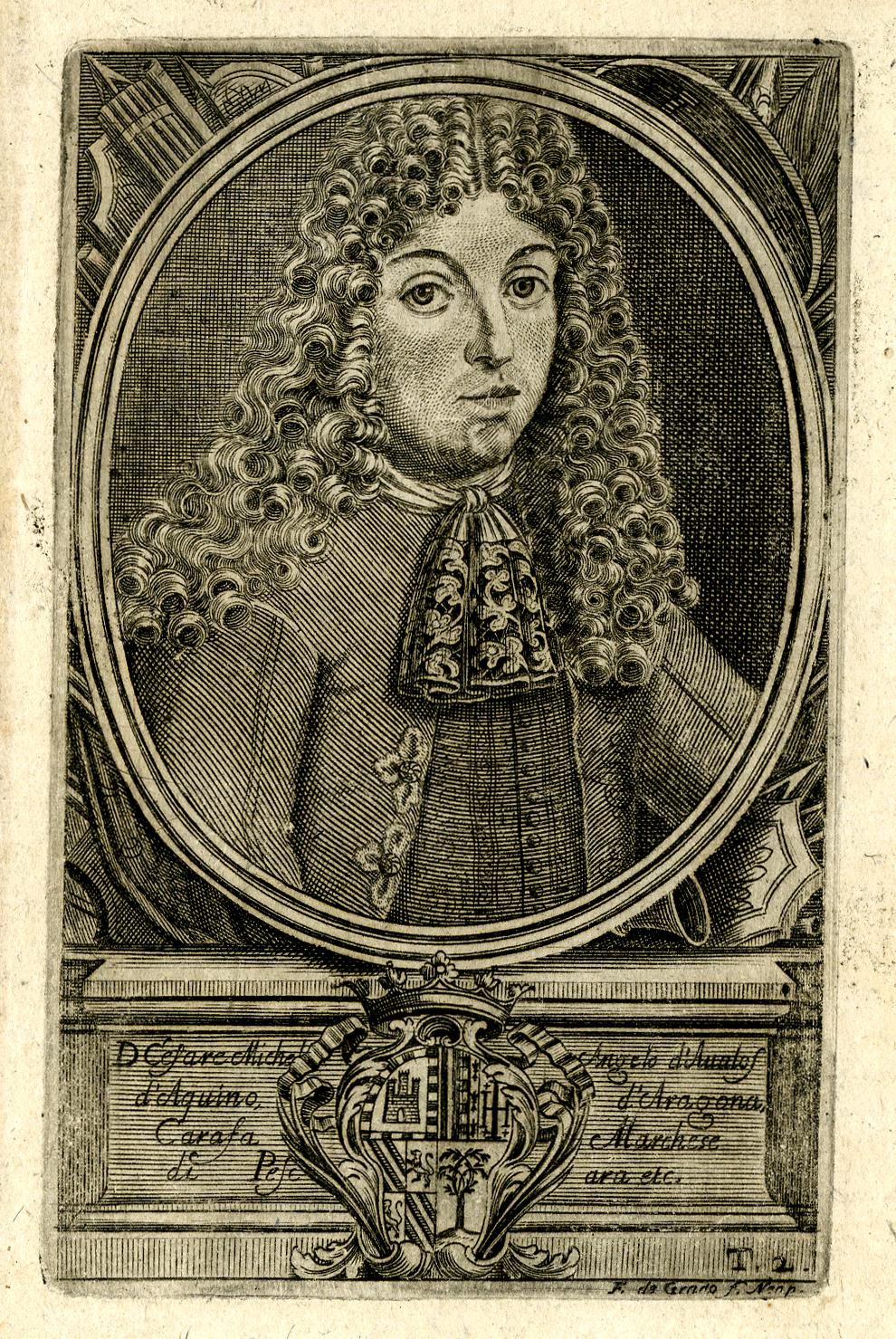
Print depicting Cesare Michelangelo d'Avalos.

=== Residences ===
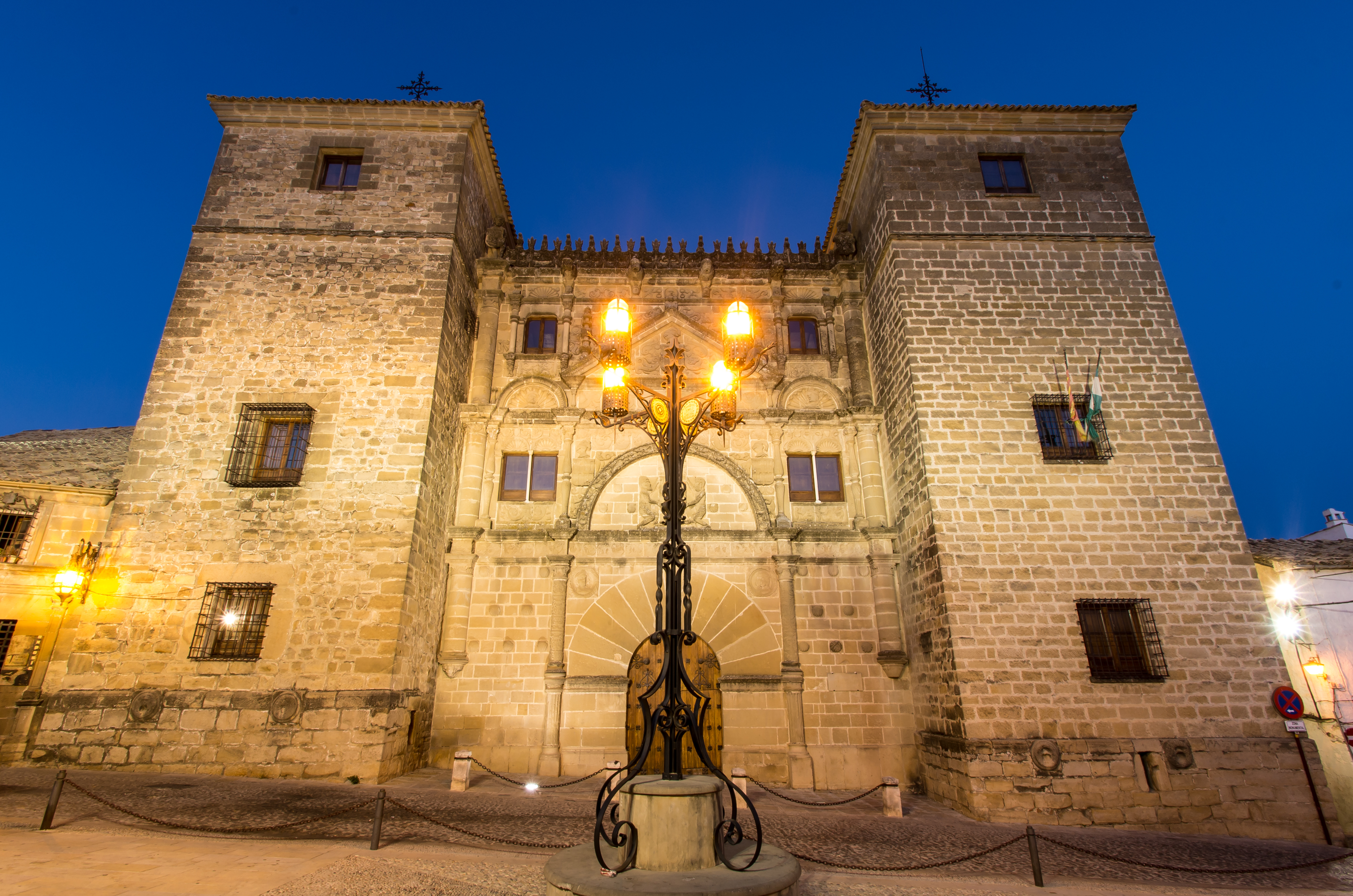
Casa de las Torres in Úbeda. The original structure was built on the initiative of Ruy López Dávalos; its current appearance dates to 1520.

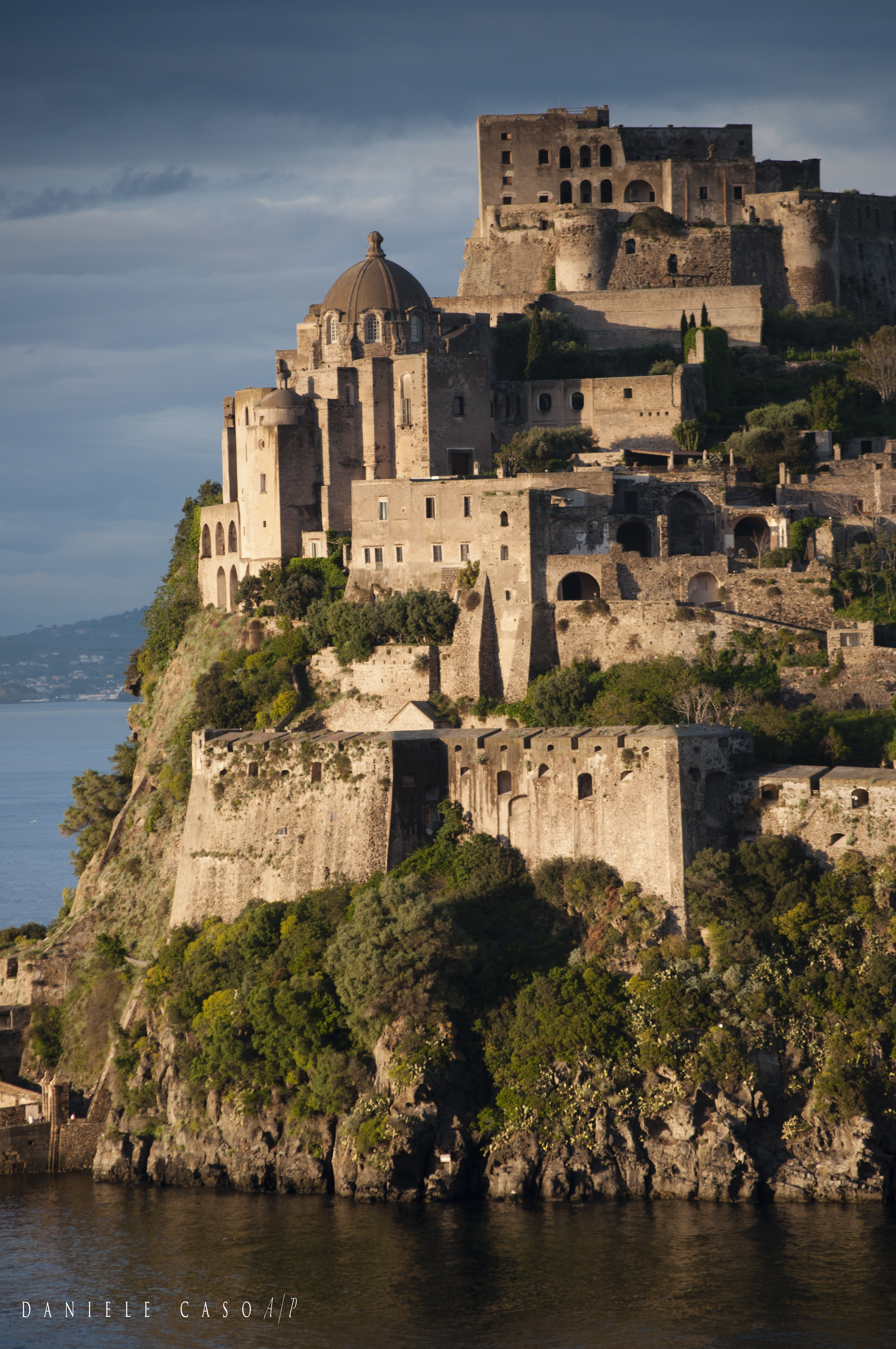
The Aragonese Castle of Ischia.

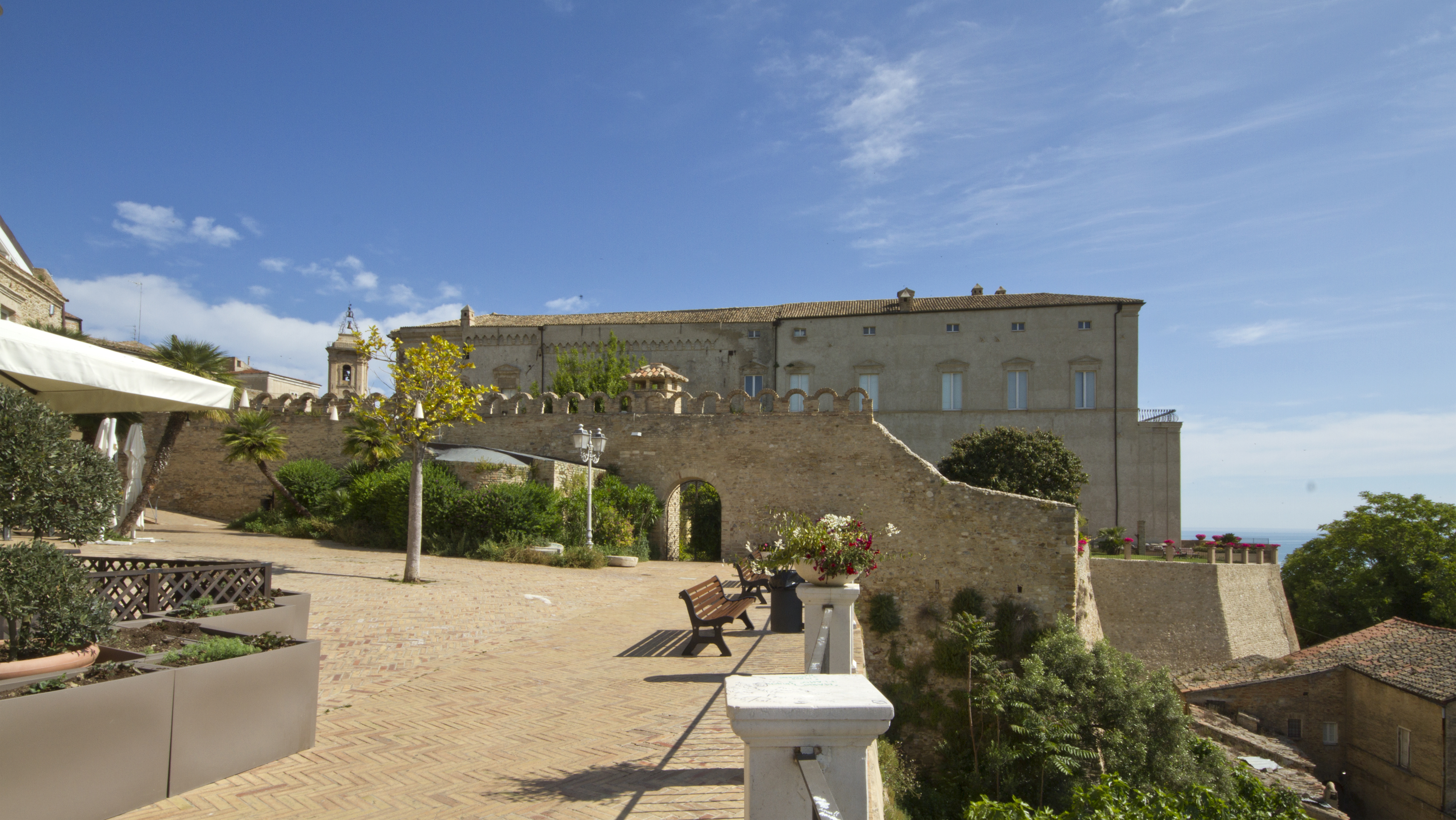
Palazzo d'Avalos in Vasto, owned by the family until 1974.

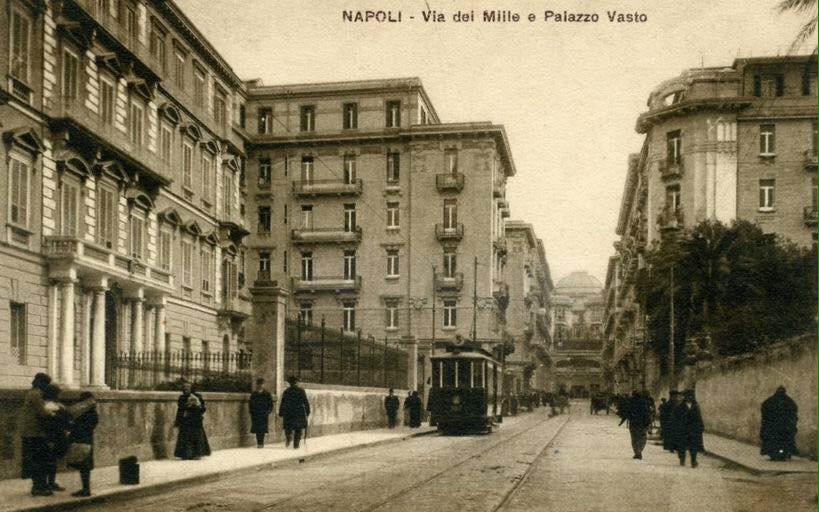
Palazzo d'Avalos del Vasto in via dei Mille in Chiaia.

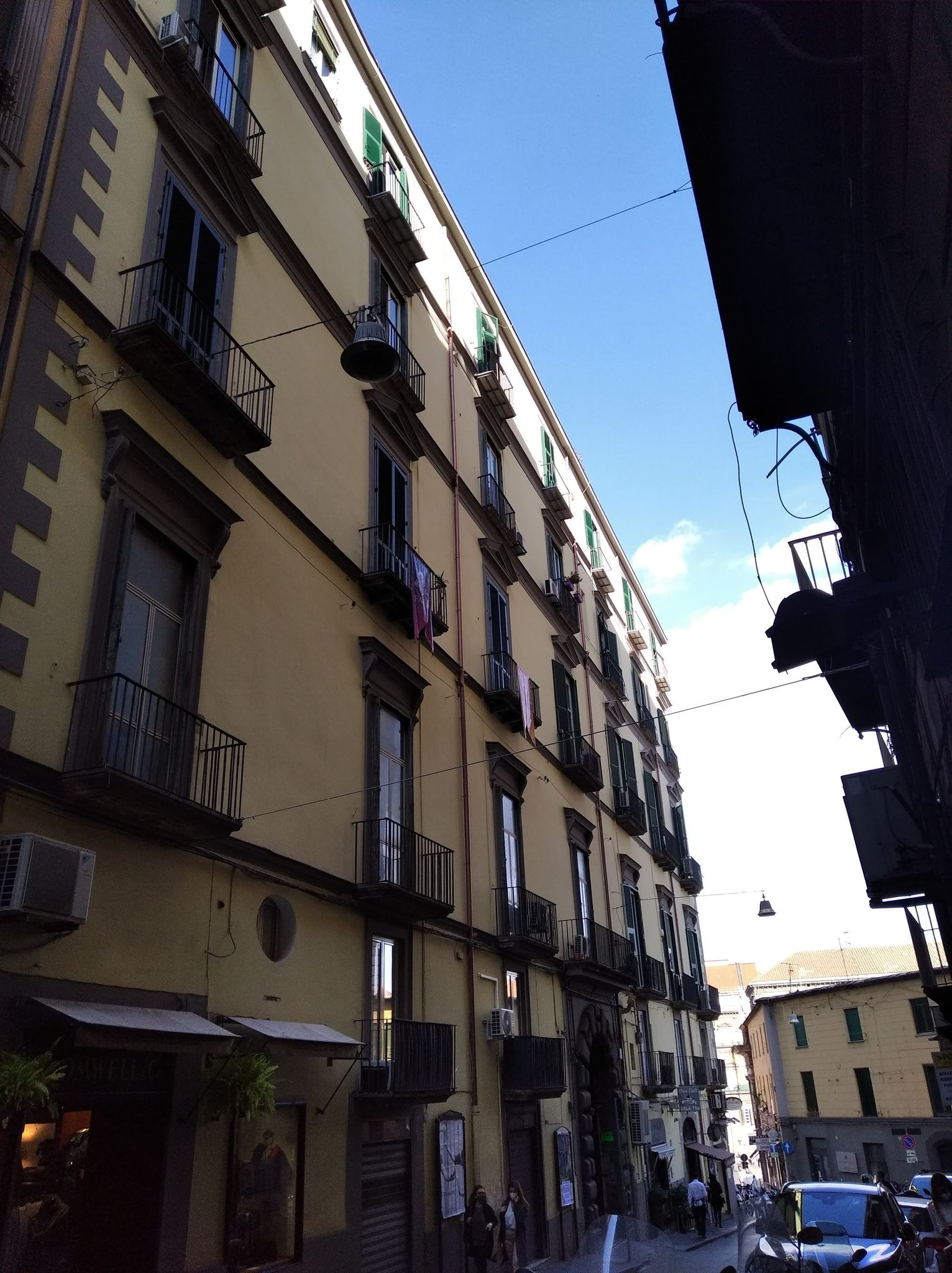
Palazzo Del Pezzo in via Gennaro Serra 75, formerly Palazzo d'Avalos di Celenza.

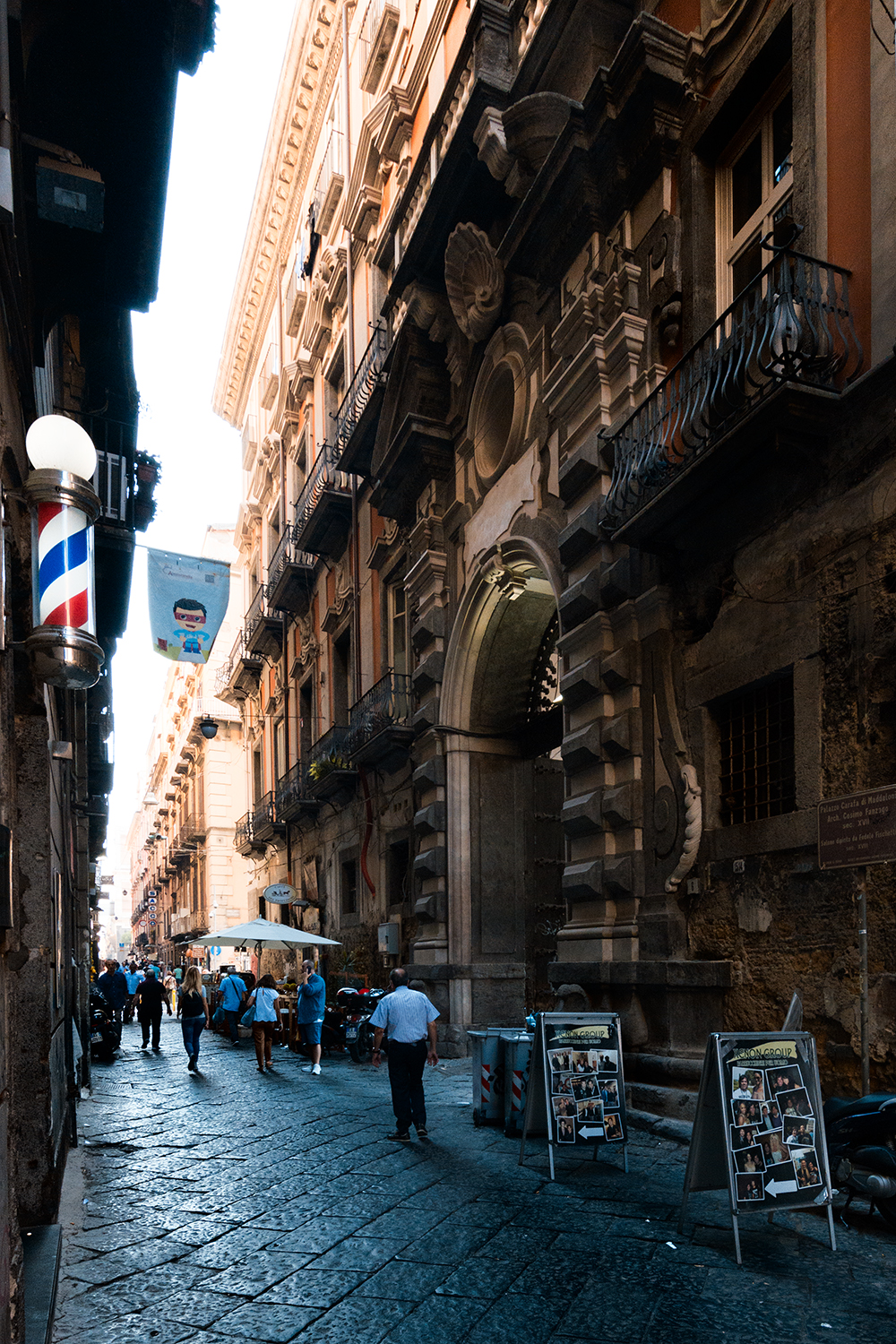
Palazzo Carafa di Maddaloni in via Maddaloni 6, formerly Palazzo d'Avalos, built in 1580 on the initiative of Cesare d'Avalos.

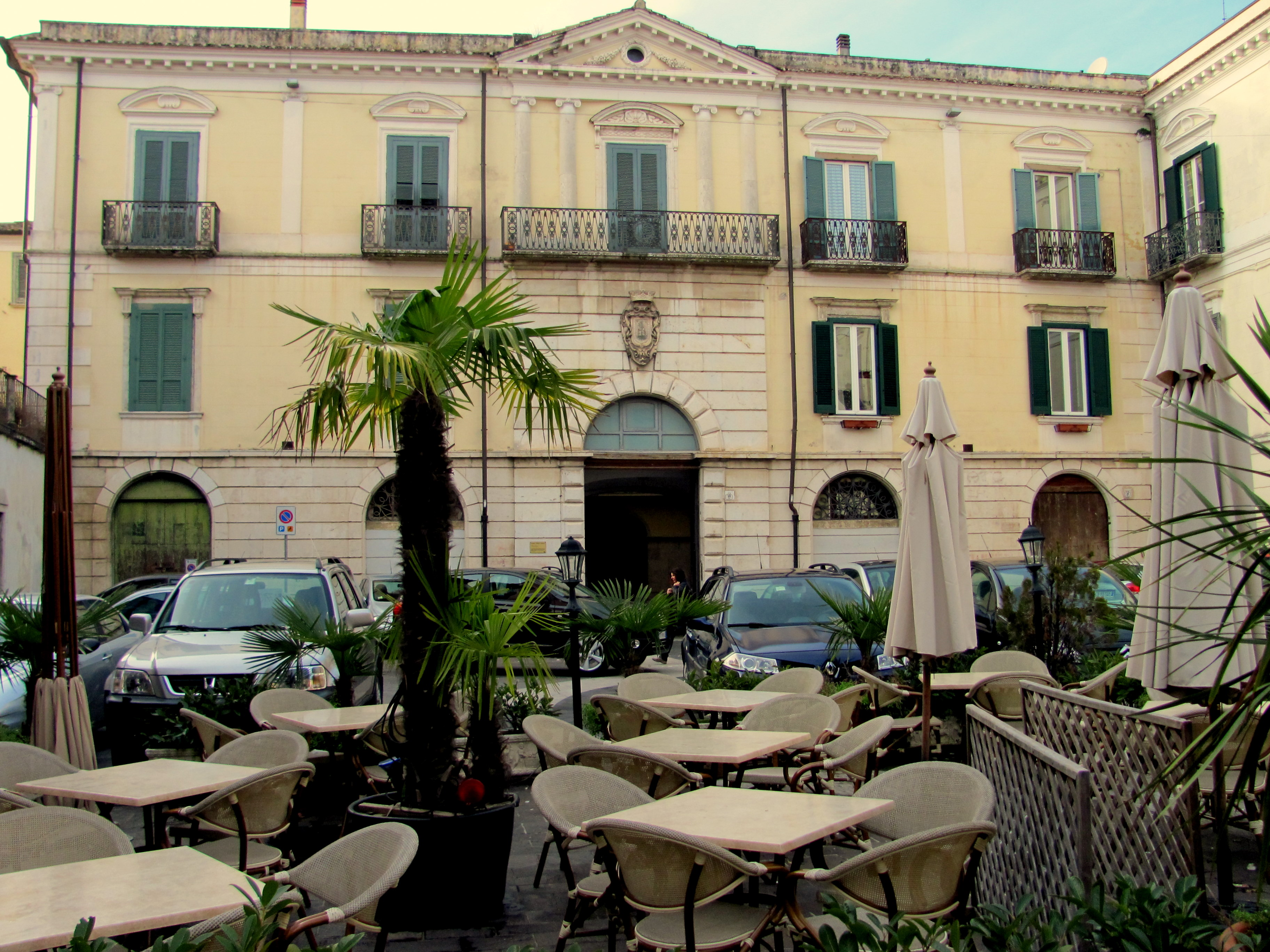
Palazzo D'Avalos-Laurelli in Isernia.

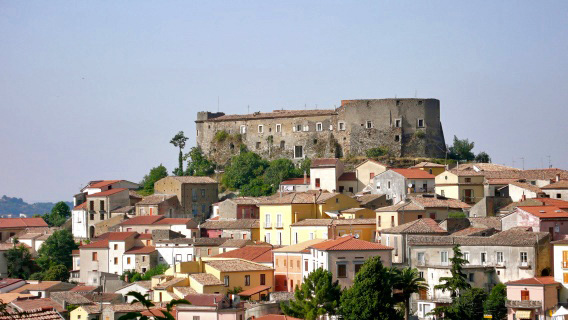
Castello di Ceppaloni

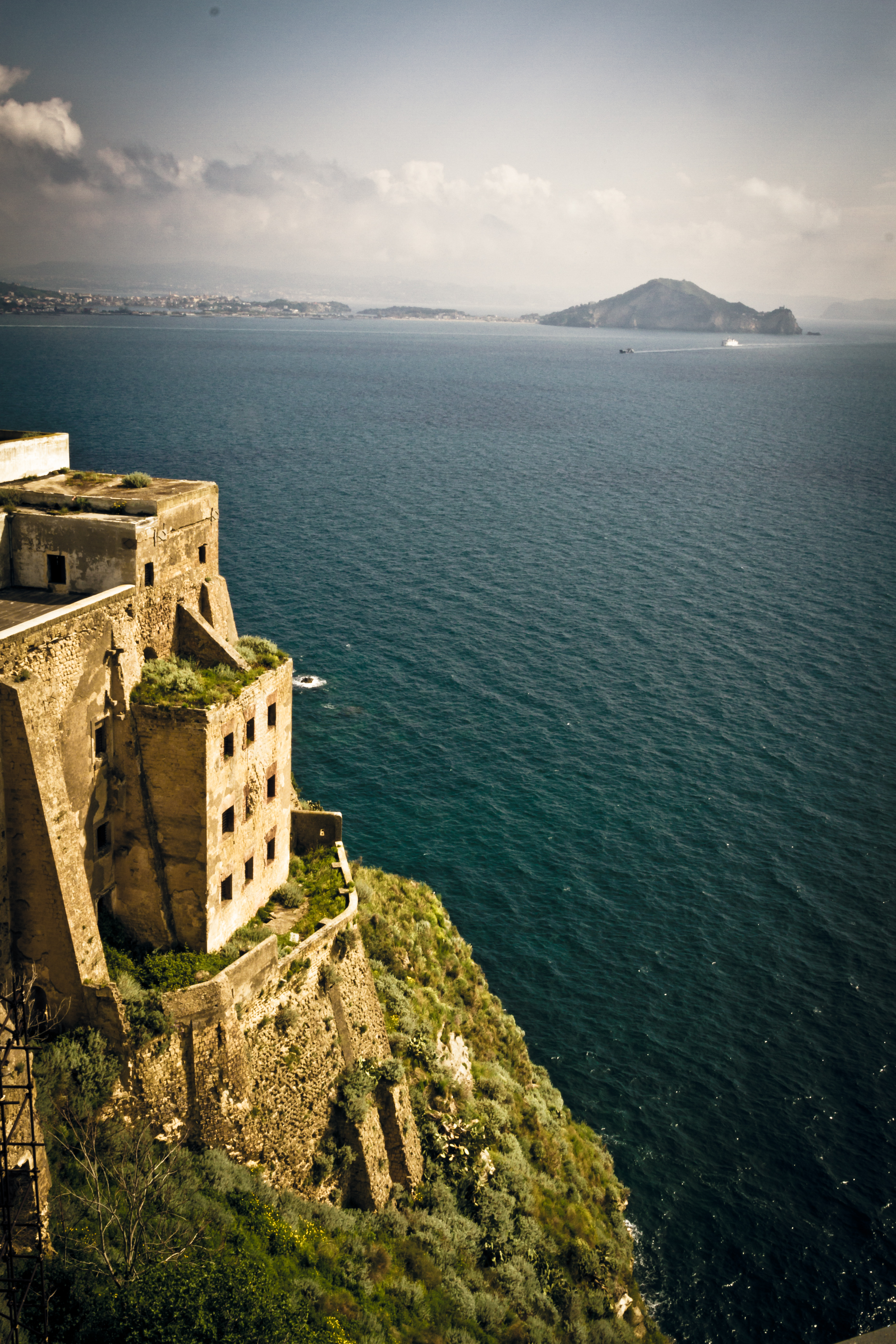
The penitentiary of Procida. The original structure, built by Cardinal Innico d'Avalos d'Aragona, was a noble palace of the d'Avalos family until it was confiscated by the Bourbons in 1734. They used it as a royal hunting residence. From 1815 it housed a military school and from 1830 it was used as a prison, undergoing various renovations.

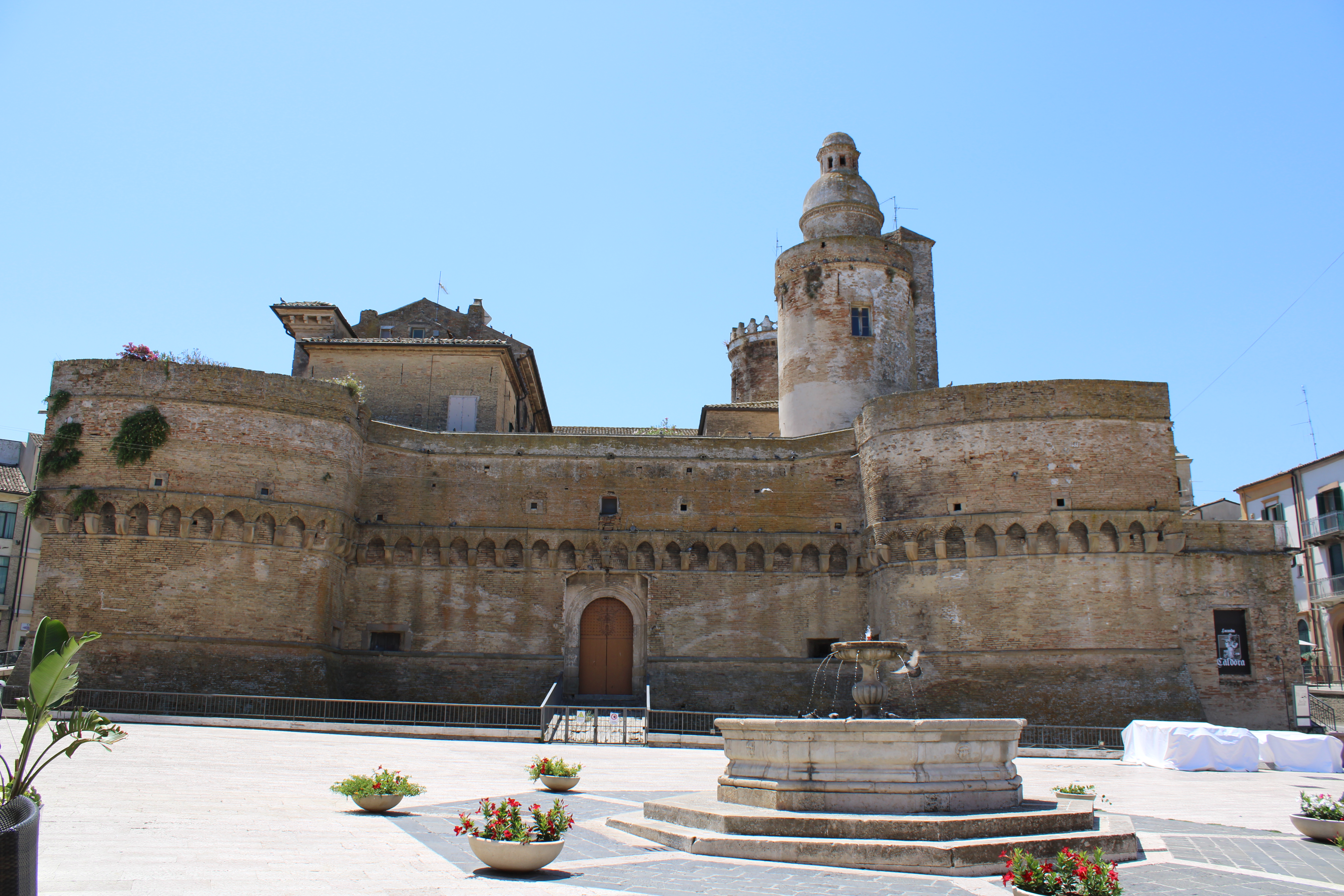
Castello Caldoresco (Vasto)

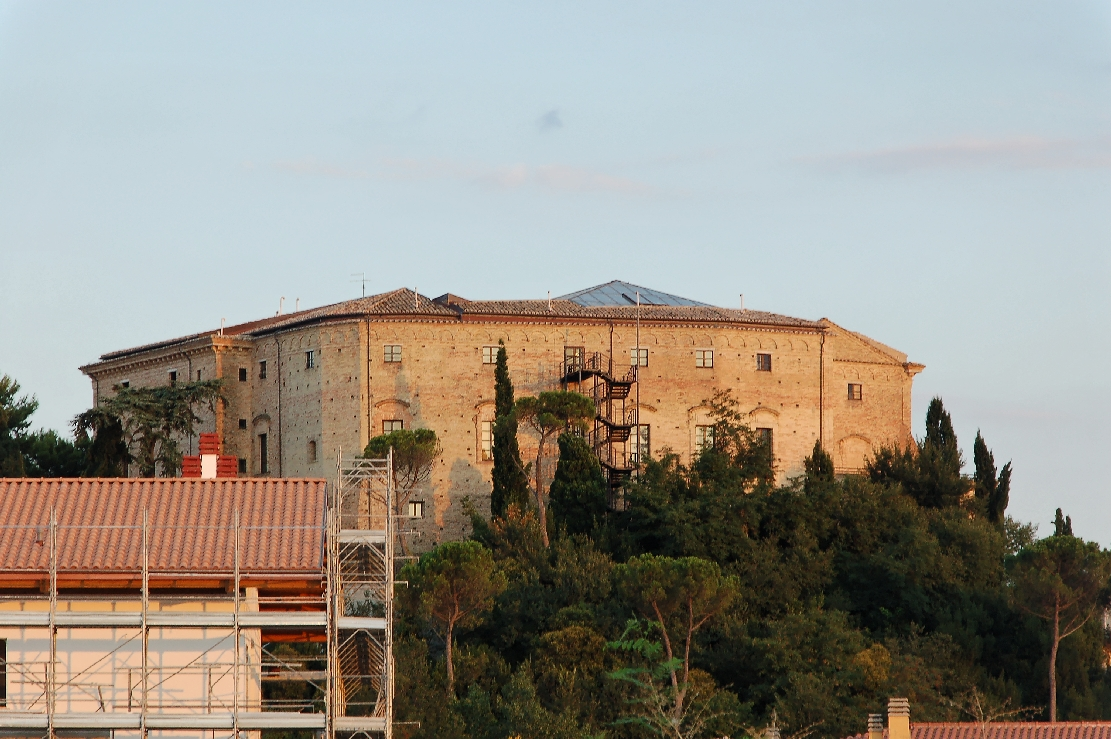
Castello Chiola

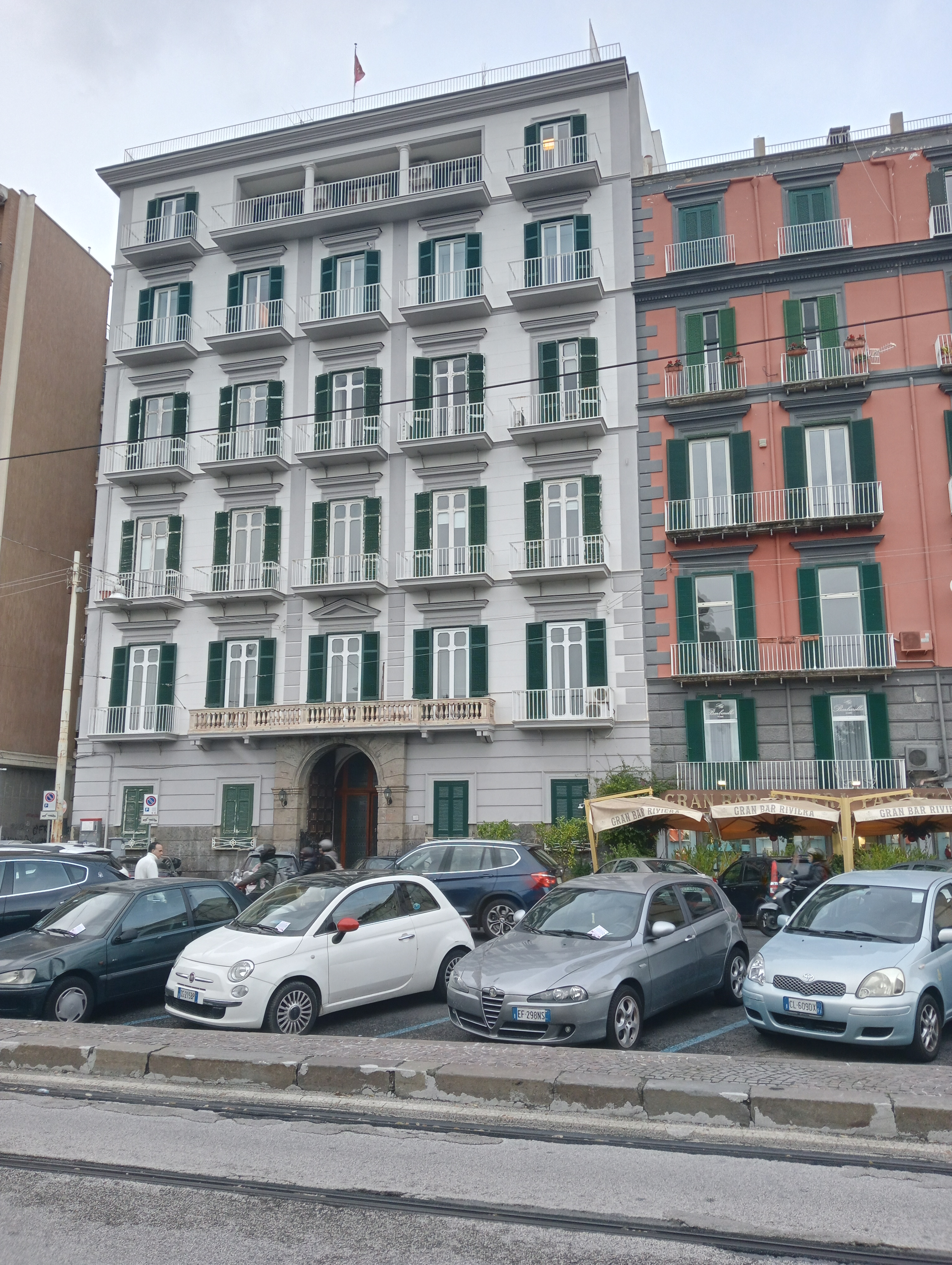
During the 19th century, Palazzo Battiloro belonged to the branch of the Princes of Torrebruna and Dukes of Celenza.

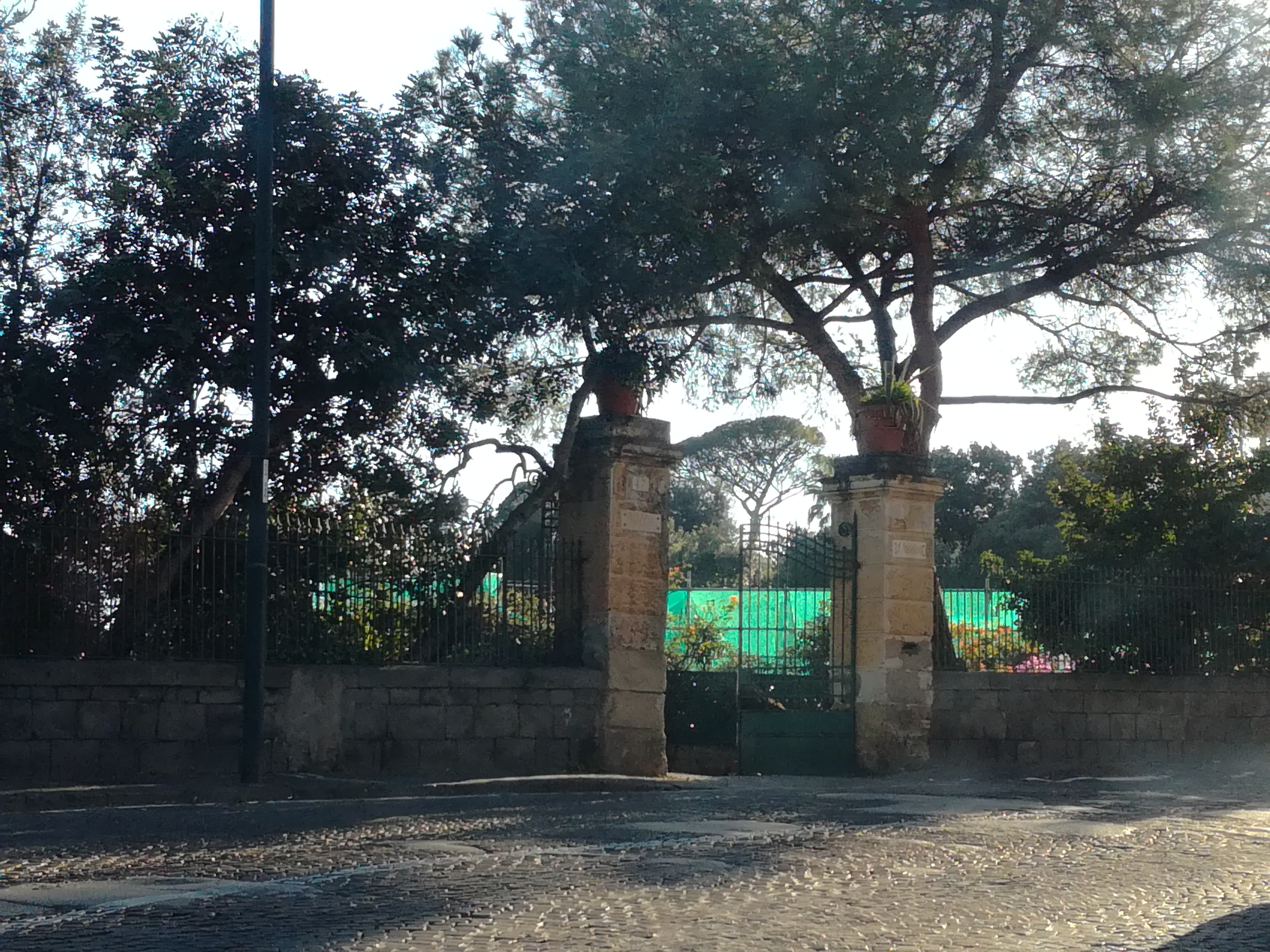
Entrance of the Villa d'Avalos in Posillipo

=== Miscellaneous ===
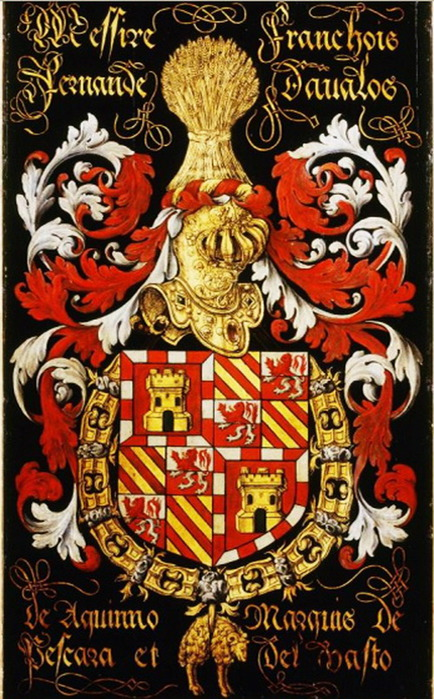
Coat of arms of the d'Avalos family at the Cathedral of Saint Bavo in Ghent, placed there on the occasion of the chapter of the Order of the Golden Fleece held there on 29 July 1559.

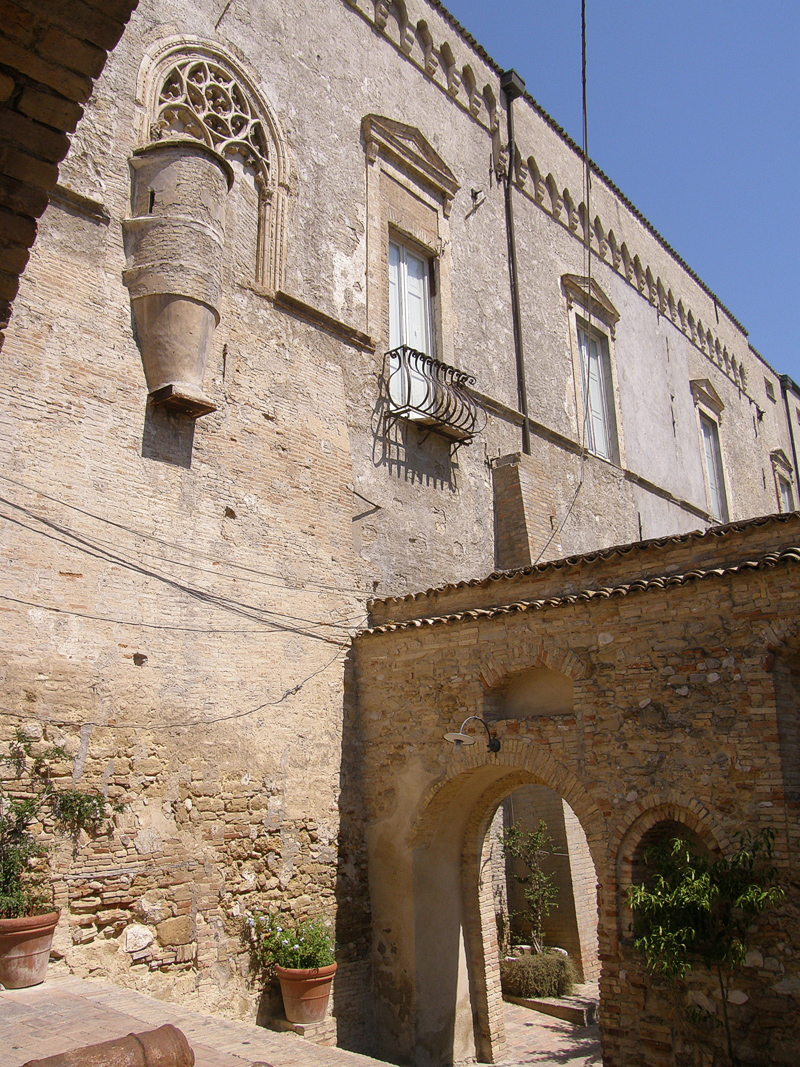
Vasto: glimpse of the palace

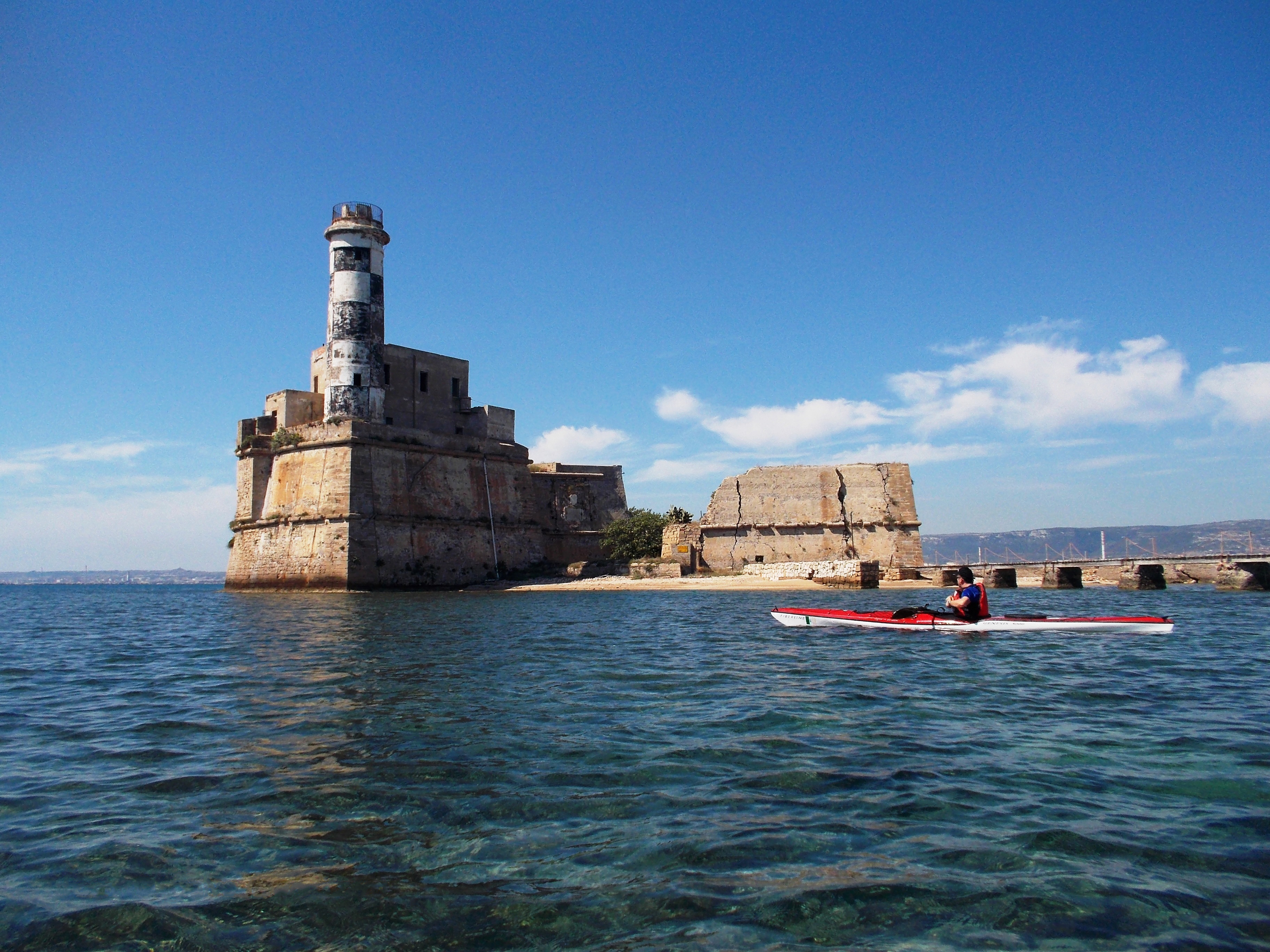
Torre Avalos Islet

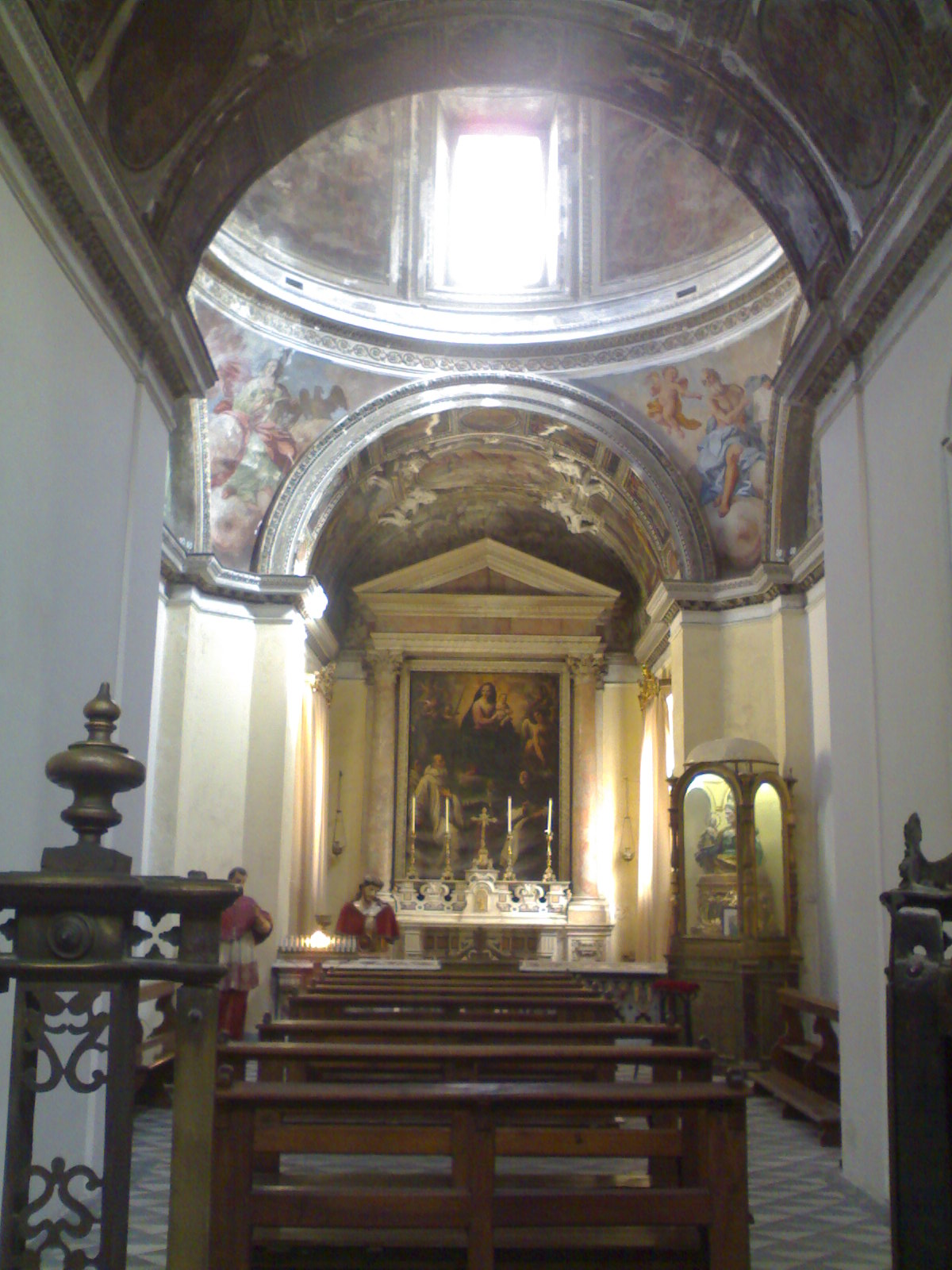
Sant'Anna dei Lombardi, Chapel d'Avalos. Almost all the members of the family were buried in the chapel d'Avalos. Vittoria Colonna, however, was buried in the collegiate church of Sant'Andrea di Paliano, her husband, Fernando Francesco I, in San Domenico Maggiore.

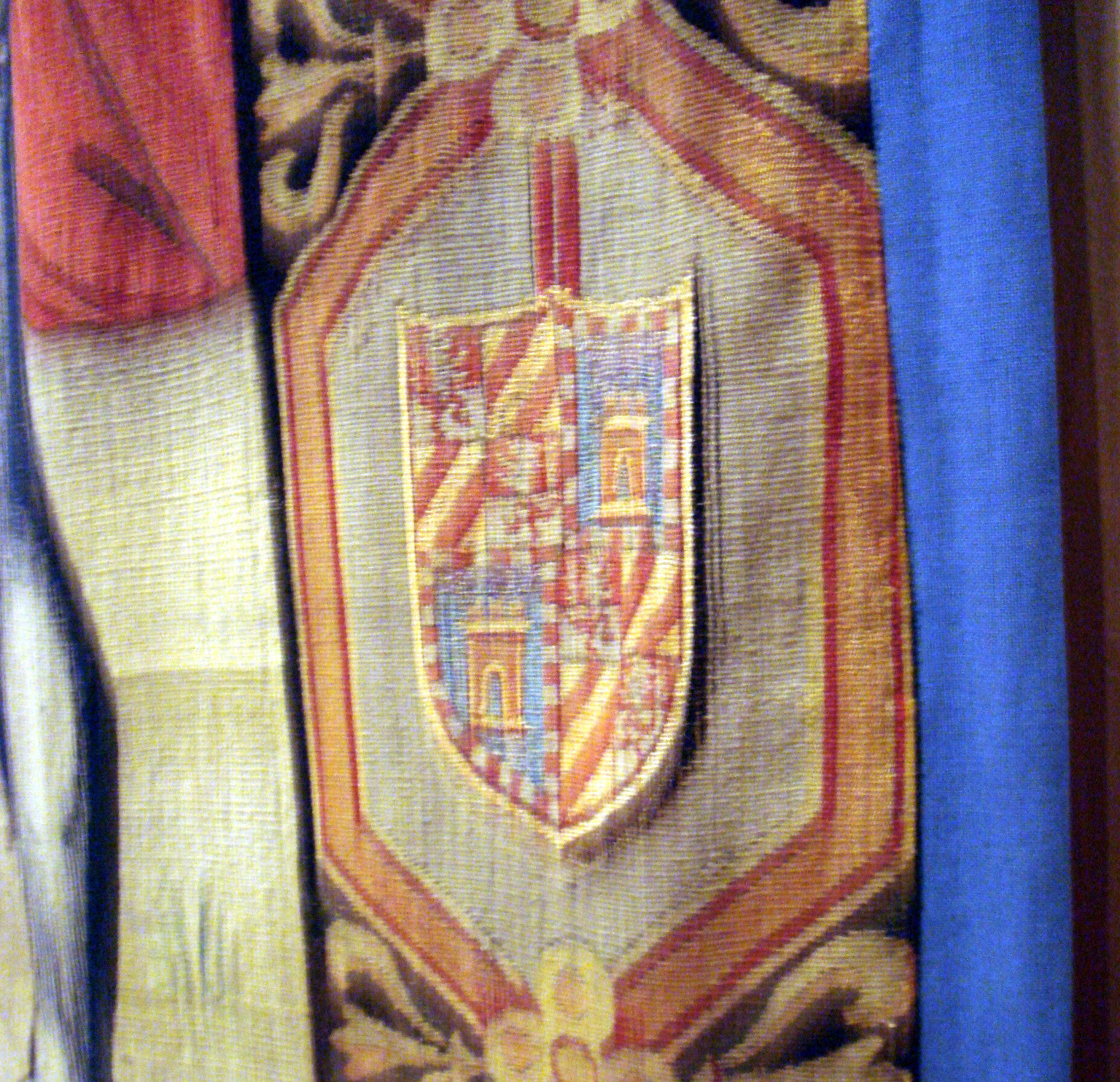
Coat of arms of the d'Avalos d'Aquino family from the Trivulzio tapestries at the Sforza Castle

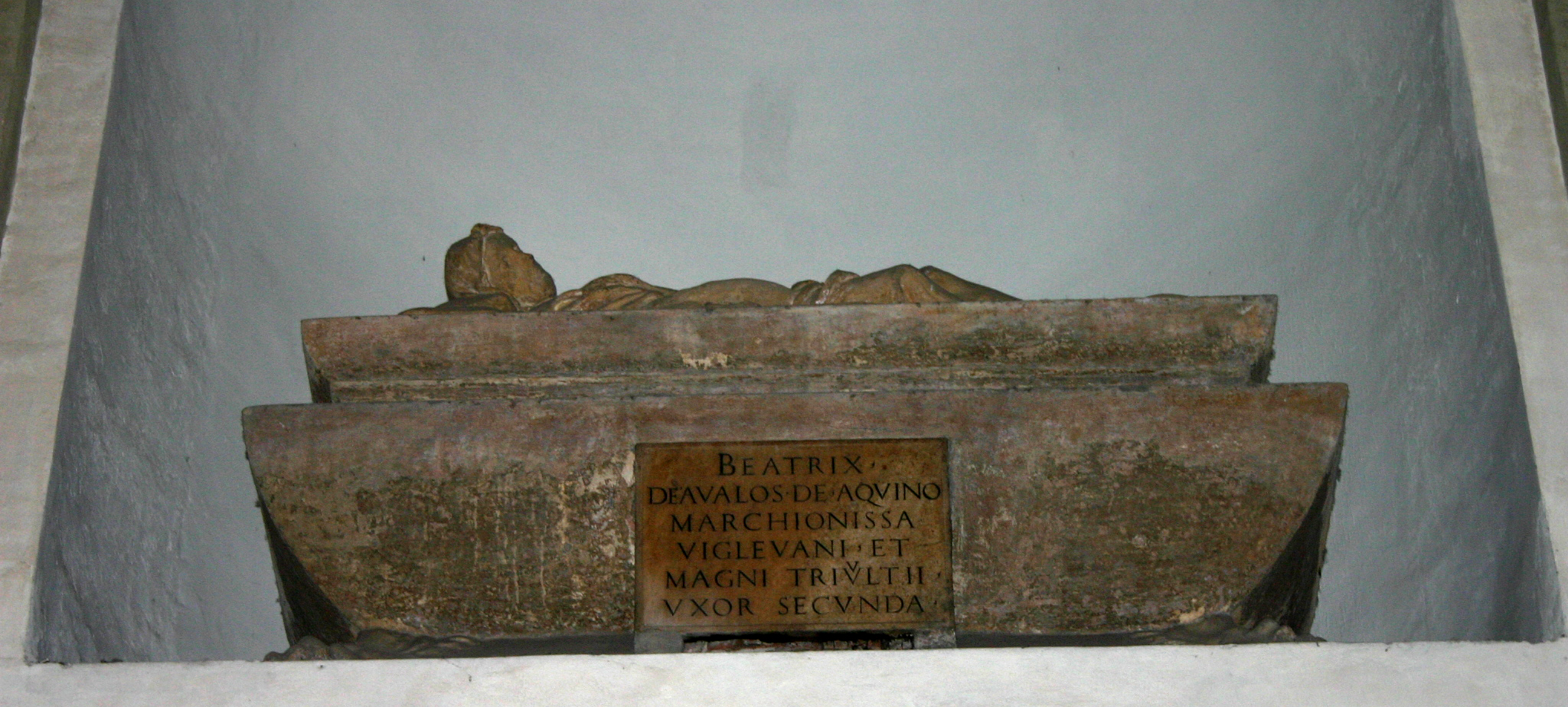
Sepulchral monument of Beatrice d'Avalos, wife of Gian Giacomo Trivulzio, daughter of Innico I d'Avalos and Antonella d'Aquino, in the Mausoleo Trivulzio, inside the Basilica San Nazaro in Brolo in Milan.

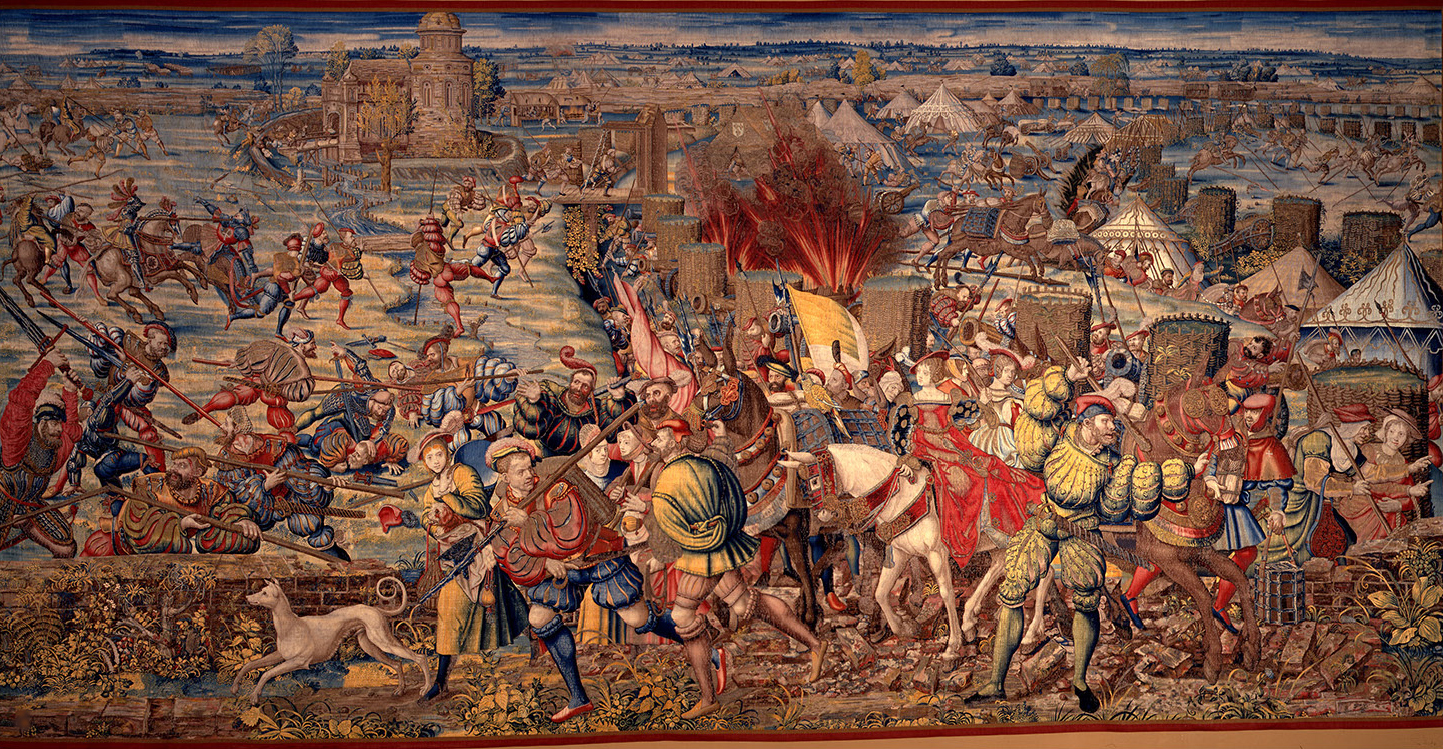
Tapestry of the Battle of Pavia, part of the collection donated by Alfonso d'Avalos to the Italian State and now preserved at the Museo di Capodimonte.

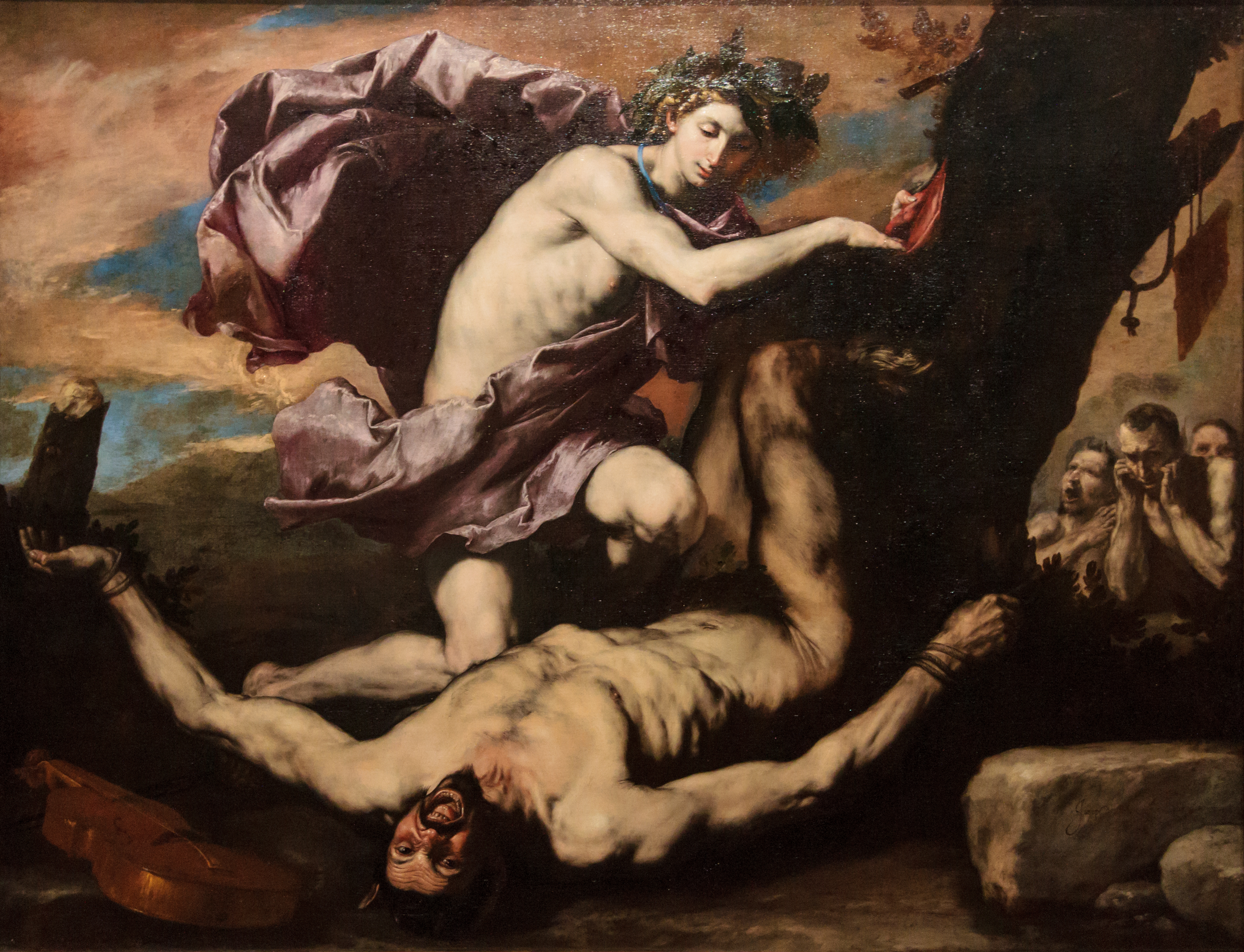
Apollo and Marsyas by Jusepe de Ribera, Collezione d'Avalos.
