= Fernando Ávalos =

Fernando Ávalos may refer to:

- Fernando d'Ávalos (1489–1525), Italian-Spanish military commander
- Francesco Ferdinando d'Ávalos (1530–1571), Italian-Spanish military commander and governor
- Fernando Ávalos (footballer) (born 1978), Argentine footballer
- Fernando Ávalos (governor), Governor of Querétaro, Mexico, 1923
