= Coscia =

Coscia is an Italian surname. Notable people with the surname include:

- Agustín Coscia (born 1997), Argentine footballer
- Aristide Coscia (1918–1979), Italian footballer and manager
- Benedict D. Coscia (1922−2008), American-born Brazilian Franciscan friar and Roman Catholic bishop
- Gianni Coscia (born 1931), Italian jazz accordionist
- Hugo Coscia (born 1952), Argentine footballer
- Niccolò Coscia (1681–1755), Italian cardinal
- Raffaele Coscia (born 1983), Italian footballer
