= Ávalos =

Ávalos is a Spanish surname or part of a surname. Notable people with the name include:

- Cristiano Ávalos dos Passos (born 1977), Brazilian footballer
- Enrique Tovar Ávalos, Mexican film director
- Fernando Horácio Ávalos (born 1978), Argentine footballer
- John Avalos (born 1964), American politician
- Johnny Avalos (born 1986), American serial killer
- Jorge Ramos Ávalos (born 1958), Mexican-American journalist and author
- José Vicente Rangel Ávalos, the mayor of Sucre Municipality in Venezuela
- Juan de Ávalos (1911–2006), Spanish sculptor
- Luis Ávalos (1946–2014), Cuban actor
- Víctor Hugo Ávalos (1971–2009), Paraguayan footballer

The d'Ávalos were prominent in Renaissance Italy :

- Fernando d'Avalos (1489–1525), 5th Marquess of Pescara, won the Battle of Pavia
- Alfonso d'Avalos (1502–1546), Italian condottiero and 6th Marquess of Pescara
- Francesco Ferdinando d'Ávalos (1530–1571), 7th Marquess of Pescara

== See also ==
- House of Ávalos, Italian aristocratic family of Spanish origin
