= Raffaele Coscia =

Italian footballer

Personal information
- Date of birth: 25 March 1983 (age 43)
- Place of birth: Salerno, Italy
- Height: 1.80 m (5 ft 11 in)
- Position: Goalkeeper

Youth career
- Salernitana

Senior career*
Years	Team	Apps	(Gls)
2002–2005	Roma	0	(0)
2002–2003	→ Tivoli (loan)	2	(0)
2005–2007	Melfi	8	(0)
2007	Manfredonia	0	(0)
2008–2009	Foggia	0	(0)
2009–2010	Battipagliese	20	(0)
2010–2011	Sapri	28	(0)
Total		58	(0)
- * Club domestic league appearances and goals

Raffaele Coscia (born 25 March 1983) is a former Italian professional footballer.

== Biography ==
=== Youth career & false accounting scandal ===
Born in Salerno, Coscia started his career at hometown club Salernitana. On 28 June 2002, few days before the end of 2001-02 fiscal year, along with youth team team-mate Giuseppe Coppola were exchanged to Roma in co-ownership deal (50% rights), for €4M, but in terms of Simone Casavola and keeper Matteo Napoli's 50% registration rights (co-ownership deal), also from Roma's Primavera youth team. Made a lurid "gain" from selling a youth player. That month Roma also did similar deal with other teams, and created a nominal profit of €55 million, but almost all gained from exchange deal and as registration rights of youth players from other teams. AS Roma was finally fined €60,000 by Criminal Court of Rome on 30 October 2007 for irregularity on youth player transfers.

=== Football career ===
Coscia was immediately loaned to Tivoli after signed a 3-year contract. He failed to play regularly and de facto without a club in next 2 seasons in although under contract with A.S. Roma. In June 2004, Roma gave up the remain rights of Casavola and Napoli to Salernitana for free (which had nominal value of €4M), and Salernitana sold the remain 50% rights to Coppola and Coscia for €80,000.

In summer 2005, Coscia joined Serie C2 side Melfi. In the second season, he competed with Valerio Curci for first choice position, ahead Luca Redaelli who played the opening match. In January 2007, he was exchanged with Matteo Apuzzo and Redaelli regained as first choice. At Manfredonia, he played as Massimo Marconato's backup along with Luigi Sassanelli the first choice at first half of the season.

In July 2008, he was signed by Foggia, as Nicolás Suárez Bremec's backup along with Damiano Milan and Massimo Zappino. Since then he played in regional leagues.

=== International career ===
Coscia was call-up to Italy U18 and U20 (the feeder team of Italy U19 and Italy U21 respectively) but did not play.
