= Tomás Dávalos de Aragón =

17th-century Catholic bishop

Most Reverend Tomás Dávalos de Aragón
- Titular Patriarch of Antioch
- Church: Catholic Church
- In office: 1611–1621
- Predecessor: Juan de Ribera
- Successor: Luigi Caetani

Orders
- Consecration: 1611 by Ottavio Acquaviva d'Aragona (seniore)

Personal details
- Born: Spain
- Died: 1621

Tomás Dávalos de Aragón (died 1621) was a Roman Catholic prelate who served as Titular Patriarch of Antioch (1611–1621).

== Biography ==
Tomás Dávalos de Aragón was born in Spain. On 21 Feb 1611, he was appointed during the papacy of Pope Paul V as Titular Patriarch of Antioch. In 1611, he was consecrated bishop by Ottavio Acquaviva d'Aragona (seniore), Archbishop of Naples. He served as Titular Patriarch of Antioch until his death in 1621.

== External links and additional sources ==
- Cheney, David M. "Antiochia {Antioch} (Titular See)". Catholic-Hierarchy.org. (for Chronology of Bishops) ^{[self-published]}
- Chow, Gabriel. "Titular Patriarchal See of Antioch (Syria)". GCatholic.org. (for Chronology of Bishops) ^{[self-published]}

Catholic Church titles
Preceded by Juan de Ribera	Titular Patriarch of Antioch; 1611–1621	Succeeded by Luigi Caetani
