= Íñigo Dávalos =

Castilian general

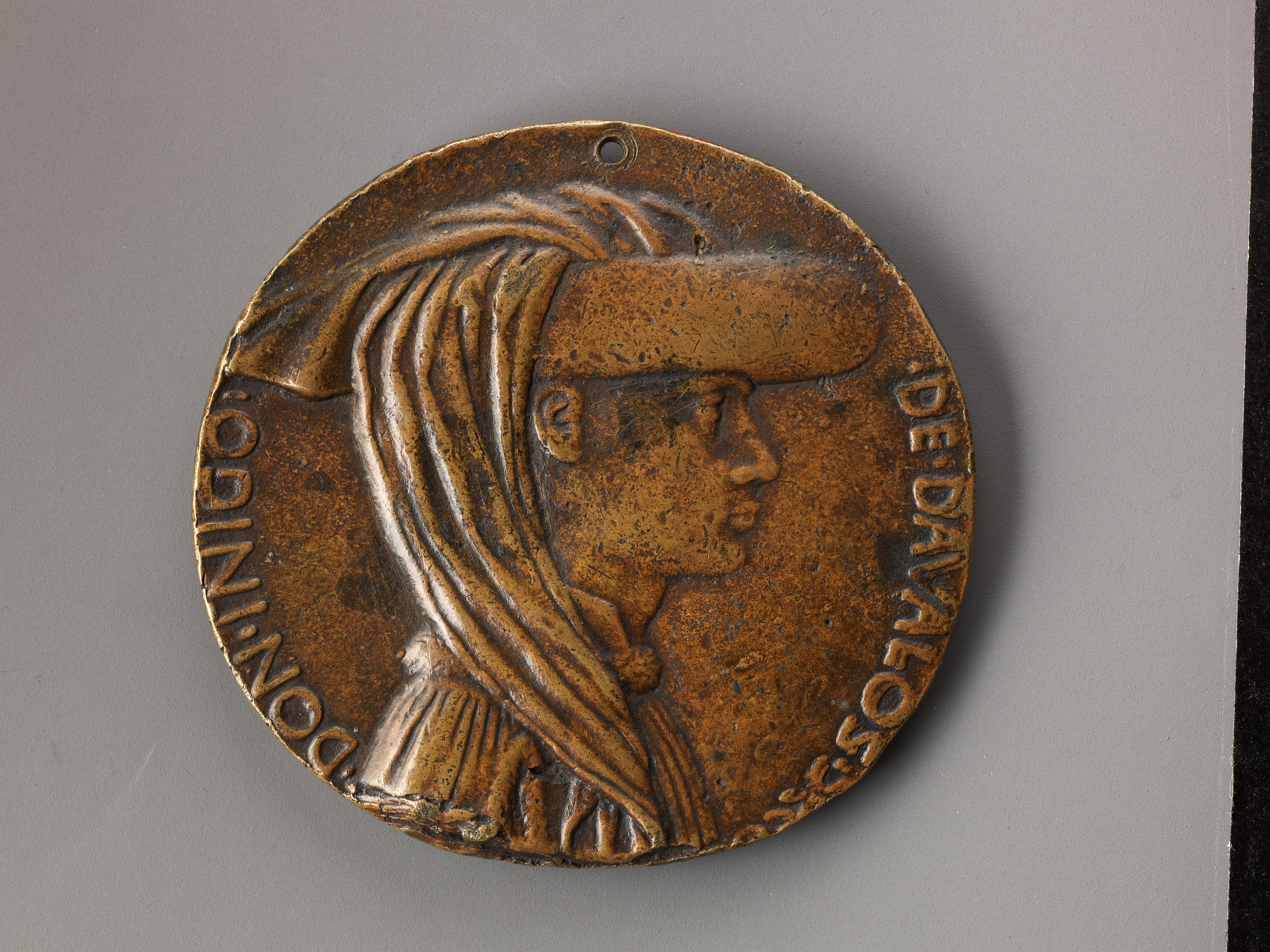
Medal of Don Íñigo Dávalos by Pisanello, 1449

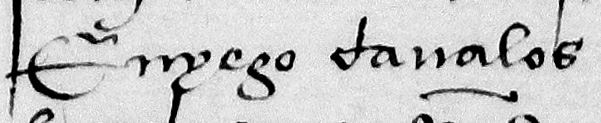
Íñigo's signature

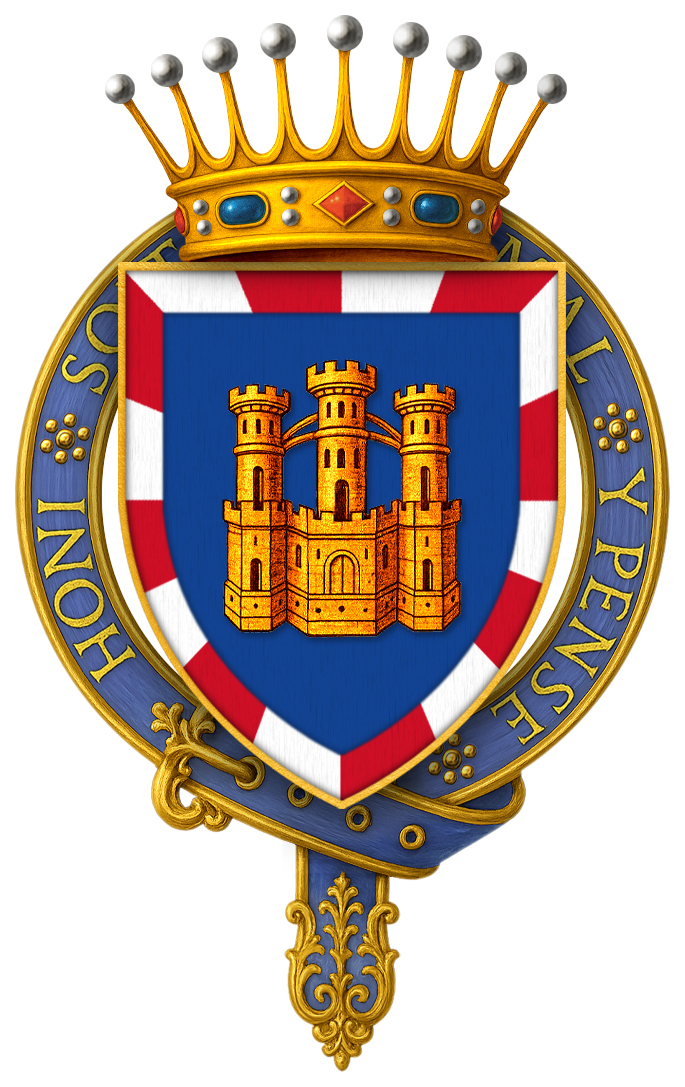
Arms as Knight of the Garter

Íñigo Dávalos (Catalan: Enyego d'Àvalos, Italian: Innico d'Avalos; died 1484) was a Castilian general who served the Crown of Aragon in Italy.

== Early life ==
Íñigo was the son of Ruy López Dávalos, Constable of Castile and Costanza de Tovar.

== Career ==
Íñigo came to Italy with Alfonso V of Aragon in 1442. He took part in the naval battle of Ponza in 1435. In 1452, after the Aragonese conquest of the Kingdom of Naples, he was made Count of Monteodorisio.

Reportedly, Íñigo has been proposed as the author of the romance Curial e Güelfa.

== Personal life ==
In 1452 he married Antonella d'Aquino, heiress to the marquisate of Pescara, which was thenceforth part of the family's fiefs.

Íñigo died in Naples in 1484: his lands were inherited by his son Alphonso.

=== Descendants ===
His grandsons, Alfonso and Fernando, and his great grandson, Francesco Ferdinando d'Avalos, were generals for Spain in the Italian Wars.
