= Ruy López Dávalos =

Count of Ribadeo

Ruy López Dávalos (Úbeda, Jaén Province, Spain, 1357 - in exile, Valencia, Spain, 1428), Count of Ribadeo, Adelantado of Murcia, 1396, Constable of Castile, 1400–1423, during the reigns of kings Henry III of Castile and John II of Castile. He was very attached to king Henry III's uncle, Ferdinand of Antequera, afterwards elected king Ferdinand I of Aragon, reigning from 1412 to 1416. He was attached then to one of Ferdinand's troublesome sons, Infante Henry of Aragon (1400–1445).

== Biography ==
He was born in Úbeda as son of Diego López, into a family of minor nobility who had emigrated from Navarre in the 13th century. As Úbeda was at the time a bordertown with the Emirate of Granada, he received the education befitting the "frontier guards" who were responsible for repelling Granadan attacks and also carrying out raids. In one of these operations, undertaken by Ruy's uncle, Pedro López Dávalos, warden of Quesada, he was taken prisoner in 1379 and held captive in Granada for several months.

After his release, he fought for King John I of Portugal in the 1383–1385 Succession War, distinguishing himself in the defense of Benavente against the troops of John of Gaunt, Duke of Lancaster (1387). After the war, he obtained the position of Chamberlain to the Prince of Asturias, which he retained when the latter became King Henry III of Castile.

From March 1392, López Dávalos was one of the influential figures in the Royal Council.
He led a military operation in 1394 in Asturias, with the siege of Gijón, which was so successful that in that year he was granted, against all custom, the sword of Constable of Castile, which until then had belonged to a member of the high nobility.
After having crushed a revolt in the Kingdom of Murcia, he was appointed Adelantado mayor of this Kingdom on 5 October 1396, thus beginning to accumulate an immense fortune.

Between 1400 and 1401, his prestige suffered a brief decline, forcing him to retreat to his estates, but from 1402 onward, he reappears in the forefront, appearing among the staunch supporters of Infante Fernando, the King's brother, who would eventually wear the Crown of Aragon. Despite being over fifty at the time, he took an active part in the Granada War between 1407 and 1410. Upon the death of Henry III, he carried out Ferdinand's orders to consolidate the regency of the very young John II.

After Ferdinand's death in 1416, a rift arose between his two sons, John and Henry, who both aspired to rule Castile, ignoring Ferdinand's advice to remain united. Ruy López Dávalos, suffering from rheumatism, remained by Henry's side, collaborating with him in the coup at Tordesillas. When the reaction, led by Álvaro de Luna, took place, Dávalos paid the price: he was forced to take refuge in Valencia (1422), while his considerable fortune was confiscated. He died there on 6 January 1428, after a long and painful illness.

== Marriage and children ==
Ruy Lopez d'Avalos married 3 time :

First to María de Fontecha. They had:

- Pedro Dávalos, Señor de Valhenoso, Avinante, Rosales y Villarrodrigo, married Maria de Orozco Suarez de Figueroa
- Diego Dávalos, Señor de Valhenoso, Villarrodrigo y otros ..., married Leonor de Ayala y Castañeda de los Señores de Escamilla
- Leonor Dávalos, married to Men Rodriguez, Señor de Santisteban del Puerto, later became 1st Conde de Santisteban del Puerto, the ancestors of the Ducal house of Santisteban del Puerto.

Secondly in 1395 to Elvira de Guevara. They had:

- Beltrán López Dávalos y Guevara.
- Constanza de Guevara.
- Hernando López de Ávalos, Lord of Arcos de la Frontera, married to María Carrillo Palomeque, had issue.
- Mencía Dávalos, married to Gabriel Fernández Manrique, Count of Osorno.

Thirdly to Constanza de Tovar y Toledo. They had:

- Íñigo Dávalos (1414–1484), Gran Camarlengo of Naples. Started the Italian branch of the Dávalos family.
- Alfonso Dávalos
- Rodrigo López Dávalos y Tovar, married to María Carrillo.
