= Francesco Ferdinando d'Ávalos =

Francesco Ferdinando d'Ávalos d'Aquino, 7th Marquess of Pescara, 3rd Marquess of Vasto (c. 1530 – 1571), was commander in chief of the Spanish army in Lombardy and Piedmont, governor of the State of Milan (1560–1563) and viceroy of Sicily (1568–1571).

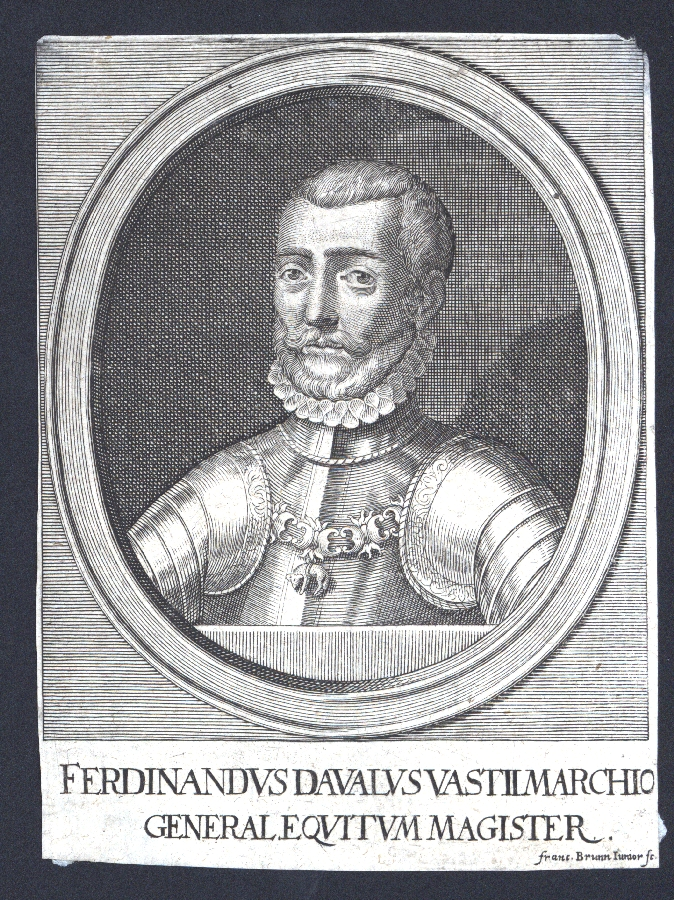
Francesco Fernando d’Avalos d’Aquino d’Aragona

== Early life ==
Francesco Ferdinando was the son of Alfonso d'Avalos, 6th Marquess of Pescara and II of Vasto. Still a child, he was named in 1536 Gran Camerlengo of the Kingdom of Naples.

== Career ==
At the head of the Spanish army in Lombardy and Piedmont since December 1555, he achieved an advantageous truce with France in March 1556, concluding the successful campaign started by the Duke of Alba.

He was then Governor of the Duchy of Milan (1560–1563) and viceroy of Sicily (1568–1571), where he diminished the power of the local barons and the Deputation.

He also became a knight in the Order of the Golden Fleece.

== Personal life ==
In 1552 he married Isabella Gonzaga, daughter of Federico II Gonzaga. They had:

- Alfonso Felice d'Avalos d'Aquino d'Aragona (1564–1593), Prince of Francavilla and his successor.
- Tommaso d'Avalos d'Aquino d'Aragona (died 1622), Count of Castelluccio, Latin Patriarch of Antioch between 1611 and 1622.

The Marquess died in Palermo in 1571.

== Sources ==
- Hickson, Sally Anne (2016). Women, Art and Architectural Patronage in Renaissance Mantua: Matrons, Mystics, and Monasteries. Routledge.
- Watanabe-O'Kelly, Helen (2016). Europa Triumphans. Routledge.

Political offices
| Preceded by Gonzalo II Fernández de Córdoba | Governors of the Duchy of Milan; 1560–1563 | Succeeded by Gonzalo II Fernández de Córdoba |
| Preceded by Carlo d'Aragona Tagliavia | Viceroy of Sicily; 1568–1571 | Succeeded by Giuseppe Francesco Landriano |
