= Palazzo D'Avalos =

Coordinates: 42.11160°N 14.71013°E

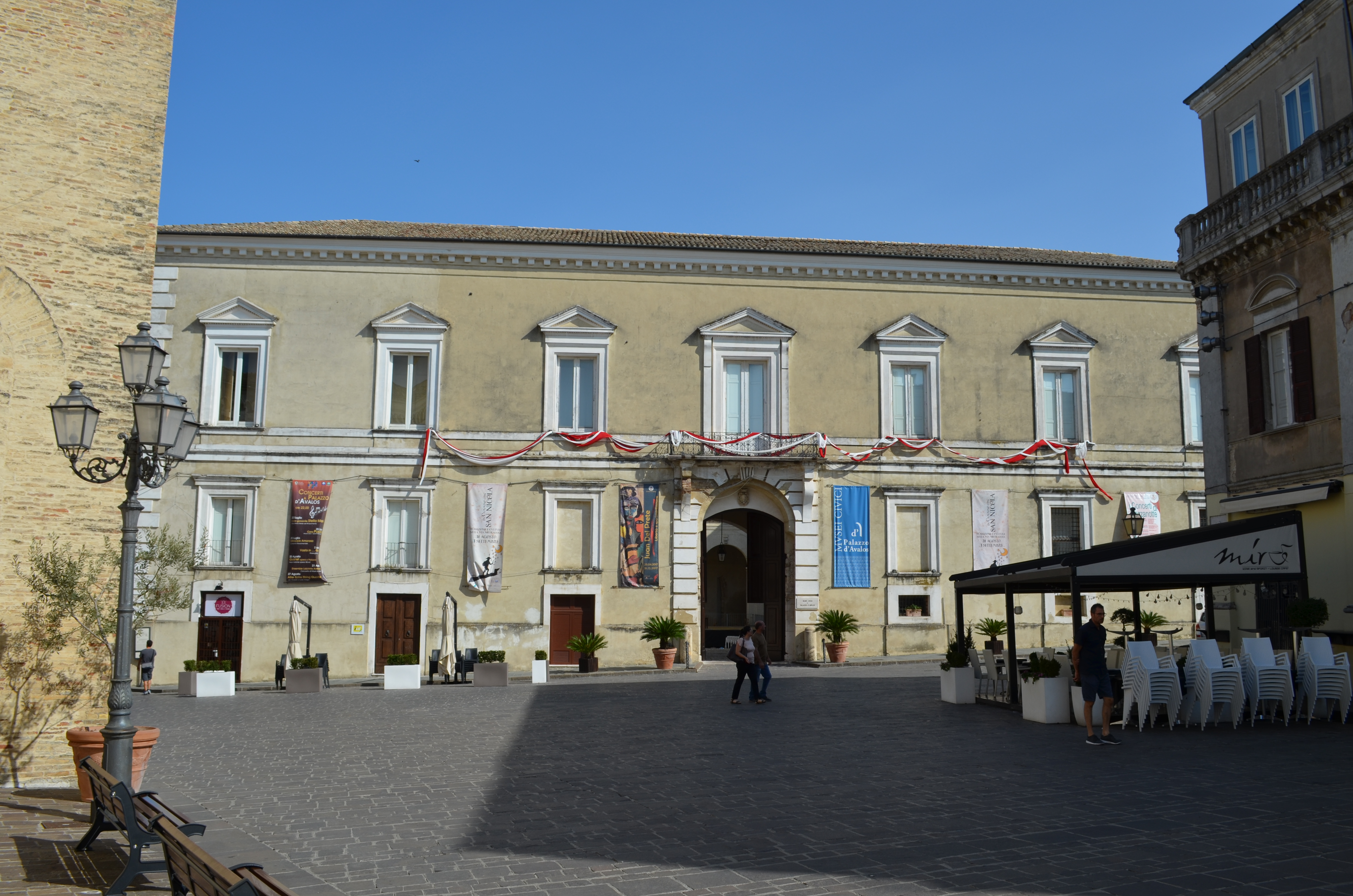
Piazza facade of the palace.

The Palazzo D'Avalos is a monumental palace located on Piazza Lucio Pudente, in the historic center of Vasto, region of Abruzzo, Italy. Until 1806, the residence of the Marquises of Vasto, it now houses three civic museums: the Archaeological Museum, the Pinacoteca (Art gallery), and the Costume Museum.

== History and Description ==
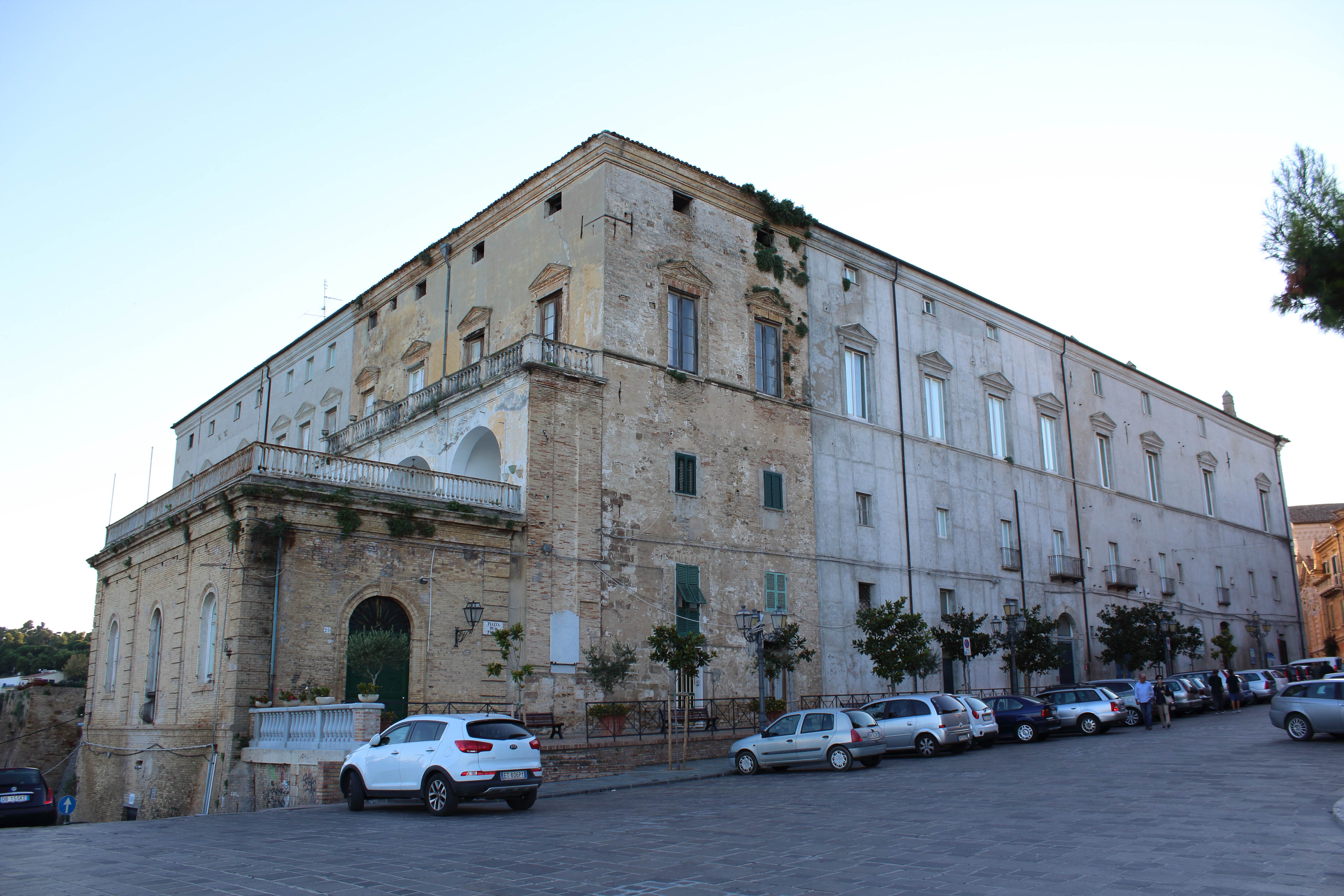
Palazzo D'Avalos

The present Renaissance-style square block, with a large internal courtyard, rises just south-east of the Town Cathedral.

Construction of this palace began being built atop or including a 15th-century structure, possibly a Benedictine monastery pucheased in 1427 by the condotierro Giacomo Caldora, then lord of the town. In 1456, the palace was damaged by an earthquake. By 1496, the Spanish aristocratic family of d'Avalos, became lords of the town, and preferred to refurbish this palace instead of living in the city castle. By 1552, the second Marquis of the family, Francesco Ferdinando, began refurbishment. The area in this century had suffered depredation by Ottoman Corsairs such as Piyale Pascià. Again in 1573, a portion of the palace was granted by Isabella Gonzaga, widow of the marchese Francesco Ferdinando, to the quando Università di Vasto. The refurbishment of the palace and general area was promoted by Cardinal Innico d'Avalos d'Aragona, brother of Francesco Ferdinando. Designs have been attributed to a local Franciscan monk, Valerio de Sanctis and work was generally complete of the facade on the piazza by the end of the 16th-century.

In the 17th-century, a fountain was commissioned in front by Cesare Michelangelo d'Avalos, In addition, a theater and grand staircase added. Because this Cesaro had allied himself with the Austrian Imperial forces during the War of Spanish Succession, he was exiled from Vasto from 1701 to 1713, and the palace was sacked. By the time of the Napoleonic invasions, the d'Avalos relocated to Naples. Much of the interiors by the early 1800s had been removed. The theater continued to screen works until 1832, when a work was given in honor of the King of Naples, Ferdinando II Bourbon. The commune purchased the palace in 1974.

== Collections ==
The museo archeologico was moved ere from the former convent of San Francesco, in 1989–1998. Among its collections are included many Roman artifacts.

The museo del costume antico was open in 1995 and has vestments dating from the 19th-century, including a hand carriage.

The Pinacoteca collection was initially started with a donation in 1898 by the brothers Giuseppe, Filippo, Nicola e Francesco Paolo Palizzi and others. It was reopened in 1999. It includes works of Filippo Palizzi, Francesco Paolo Michetti, Gabriele Smargiassi, and Giulio Aristide Santoro. There is now a gallery of Arte Contemporanea with a nucleus formed by the donation of the Paglione-Olivares family, including works by the Italian artists Bonichi, Carmassi, De Stefano, Falconi and the Spaniards Mensa, Orellana, Ortega, Quetglas.
