= Guillaume de Montfort (bishop of Saint-Malo) =

French bishop

Guillaume de Montfort (died 27 September 1432, Siena, Italy) was a 15th-century French cleric, Bishop of Saint-Malo and cardinal.

== Biography ==
Montfort was born in Dinan, Brittany, the son of Raoul VIII de Montfort, lord of Montfort and Gaël, and Isabeau de la Roche-Bernard, lady of Loudéac (died 1400).

Entering the church at a young age, Montfort was appointed protonotary apostolic and Archdeacon of Dinan. Named Bishop of Saint-Malo on 13 October 1423, the following year he took command of the military forces of Brittany, and advanced on the English besieging Mont Saint-Michel, forcing them to withdraw.

Pope Martin V offered Montfort the bishoprics of Saint-Brieuc in 1424, and of Dol in 1430, but he refused both.

On 29 May 1424, he demonstrated his opposition to John V, Duke of Brittany, who was constructing a dungeon at the château of Saint-Malo, by throwing a stone. Thus he affirmed his rights over the territory, which the duke had appropriated.

He was created a cardinal in pectore by Pope Martin V on 8 November 1430. The pope died the following year; his successor, Pope Eugene IV, announced his nomination in the consistory of 11 March 1432. He received the cardinal's hat and the titular church of cardinal de Sainte-Anastasie on 13 June 1423. He was henceforward known as "the cardinal of Brittany".

While visiting Rome, he travelled secretly to the Council of Basel, against the pope's wishes. He died suddenly en route, possibly poisoned, on 27 September 1432, and was buried in the church of the Cordeliers in Siena.

All his acts portray for us a pastor full of kindness for his flock, at home with his canons as with his equals, affable and benevolent to all, of an exemplary conduct, and in all, enjoying the reputation of a saint

— François Manet

== See also ==
- Cardinals created by Martin V

== Bibliography ==
- Moréri, Louis. Le grand dictionaire historique ou le melange curieux de l'histoire sacrée et profane at Google Books, publisher Denys Mariette, 1707, p. 375
- Lobineau, Guy Alexis; Morice, Pierre-Hyacinthe. L'Église de Bretagne, depuis ses commencements jusqu'à nos jours at Google Books, p. 232
- Manet, François. Biographie des Malouins célèbres at Google Books, H. Rottier, 1824, p. 364
