= Romanini =

Romanini is an Italian surname. Notable people with the surname include:

- Diego Romanini (born 1978), Italian auto racing driver
- Giovanni Romanini (1945–2020), Italian comic artist
- Roberto Romanini (born 1966), Italian lightweight rower
- Samuele Romanini (born 1976), Italian bobsledder

== See also ==
- Romani (surname)
