= Theodoric Vrie =

Theodoric Vrie (dates unknown) was a historian of the Council of Constance.

== Life ==
He describes himself as a brother of the Order of Hermits of St. Augustine, and a lector in sacred theology in the province of Saxony. From his description of facts it appears that Vrie must have been an eyewitness to the events he records. The history is brought down to the election and consecration of Pope Martin V, 21 Nov., 1417. Vrie was still living in the summer of 1425, when a general chapter of his order at Rome authorized the republication of his work.

== Works ==
Vrie's work is modelled on the De consolatione philosophiæ of Boethius; this also is its original title. It presents a picture of the facts and disorders of the time, pointing out their source, and the remedy under the form of a series of dialogues in prose and metre between Christ and the Church Militant. The "De consolatione" of Vrie was printed in Cologne in 1484 with the works of Jean Gerson (fourth volume), but was not repeated in the Strasbourg edition of Gerson in 1494. It was printed again with a short life of the author in von der Hardt (see below).
