= Castello Caldora, Civitaluparella =

Castle in Civitaluparella, Italy

Coordinates: 41.9448°N 14.3010°E

Caldora Castle
- Castello Caldora
- Civitaluparella
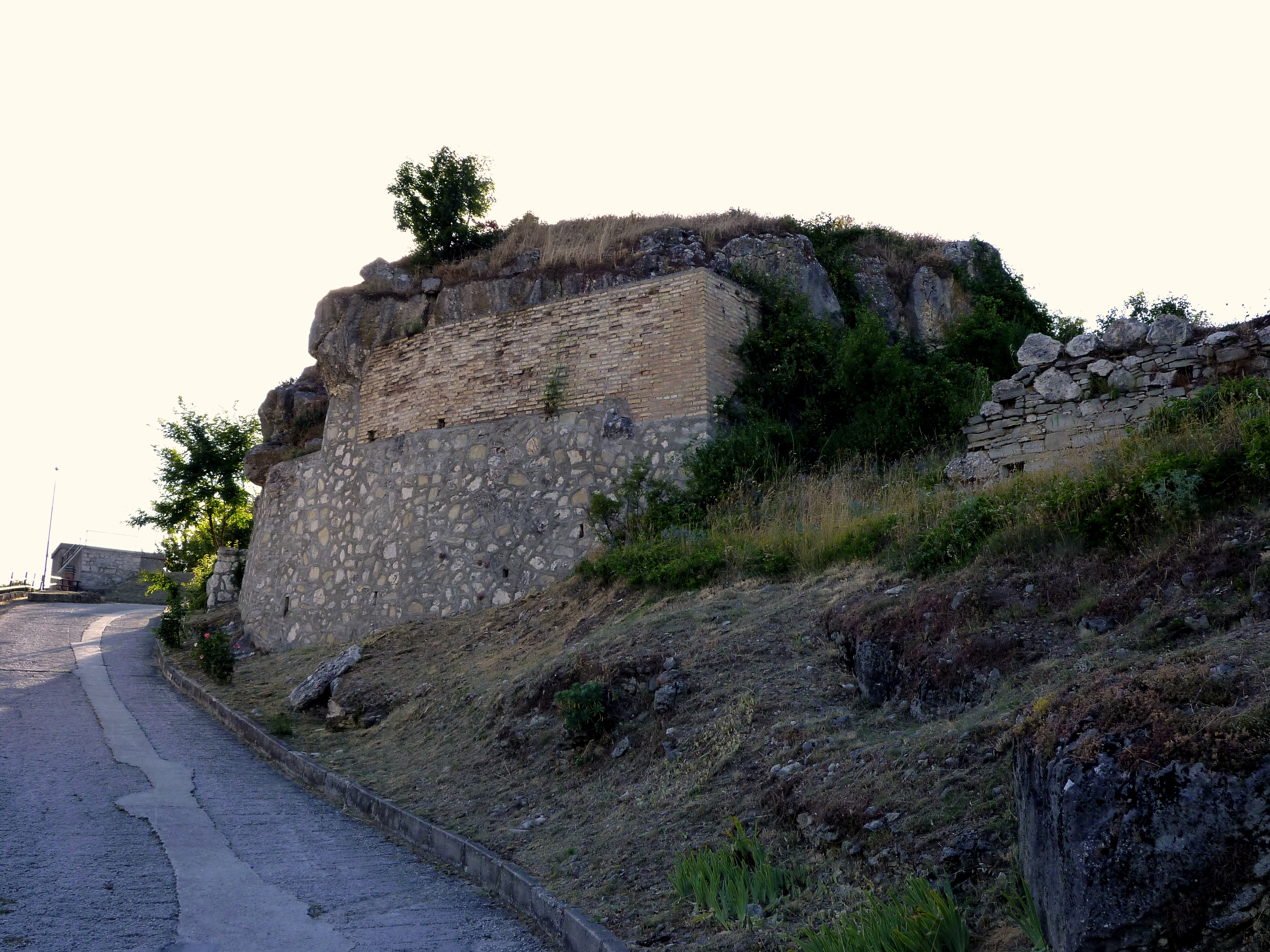
- Castle in Civitaluparella

Site information
- Type: Castle

Location

Site history
- Built: 12th century

Castello Caldora (Italian for Caldora Castle) is a Middle Ages castle in Civitaluparella, Province of Chieti (Abruzzo).

== History ==
There is no reliable information about the foundation of the castle. The first historical source is a papal bull of Pope Alexander III in 1173 including the castle within the boundaries of the diocese of Chieti.

The strategic location of the original fort, located on the highest part of the town in a controlling the entire valley of Sangro river, pushed Jacopo Caldora to build a new castle, selected in the 15th century by his son Antonio as base during his battles against Ferdinand of Aragon, who conquered the castle at the end of the military campaign.

== Architecture ==
The castle is in ruins now: there are just few walls less than a meter high in the highest part of the town that don’t allow to reconstruct its architecture.

In addition to the building, the cliff leading to the castle was also demolished in several points to hinder the passage of any assailant.
