= Coccia =

Coccia is an Italian surname which is common in southern Italy. It is derived from an Italian slang word for 'head,' implying that the owner of the name is stubborn or arrogant. Coccia is most common in the Italian region Lazio.

Notable people with the surname include:

- Carlo Coccia (1782–1873), Italian opera composer
- Luigia Coccia, Italian Roman Catholic nun and missionary
- Maria Rosa Coccia (1759–1833), Italian harpsichordist and composer
- Ugo Coccia (1895–1932), Italian journalist and politician
- Vittorio Coccia (1918–1982), Italian footballer
