= Castello Caldoresco =

Castle in Abruzzo, Italy

Caldora Castle
- Castello Caldoresco
- Vasto
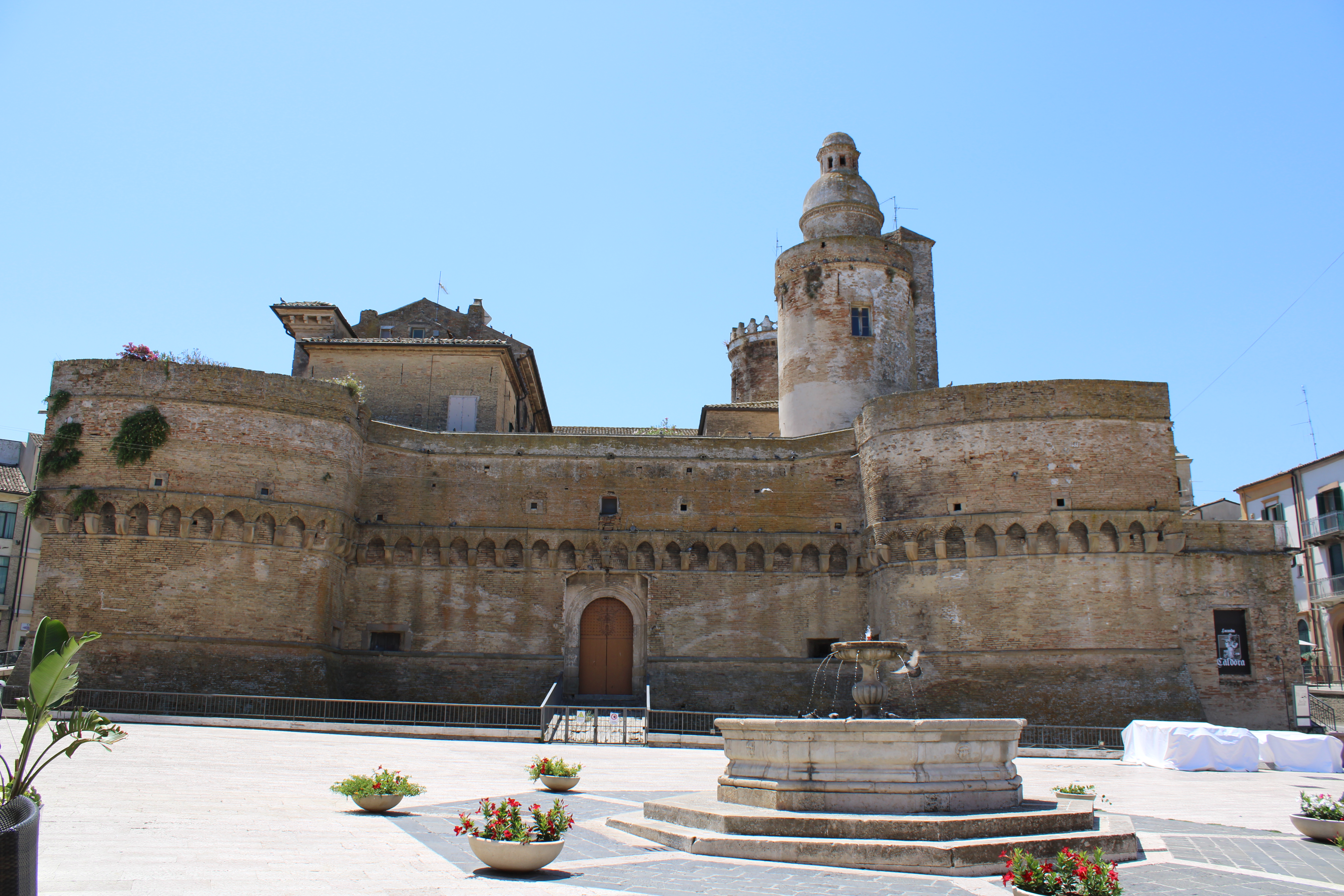
- Castle in Vasto

Site information
- Type: Castle

Location
- Coordinates: 42°06′43.17″N 14°42′29.24″E

Site history
- Built: 15th century
- Built by: Jacopo Caldora

Castello Caldoresco (Italian for Caldora Castle) is a Renaissance castle in Vasto, Province of Chieti, Abruzzo, south-eastern Italy. It is a private property and therefore is not open to the public.

It was built in the early 15th century by the then-lord of the city, Jacopo Caldora, starting from a pre-existing large tower (which in turn dated to the 14th-15th centuries). Later it was modified and restored by Innico d'Avalos d'Aragona.

The castle is located on a promontory overlooking the Adriatic Sea coast. It includes four buildings connected, within a square courtyard inside. Three of the four corners features a cylindrical tower, while the bastions visible in some parts are among the oldest features.

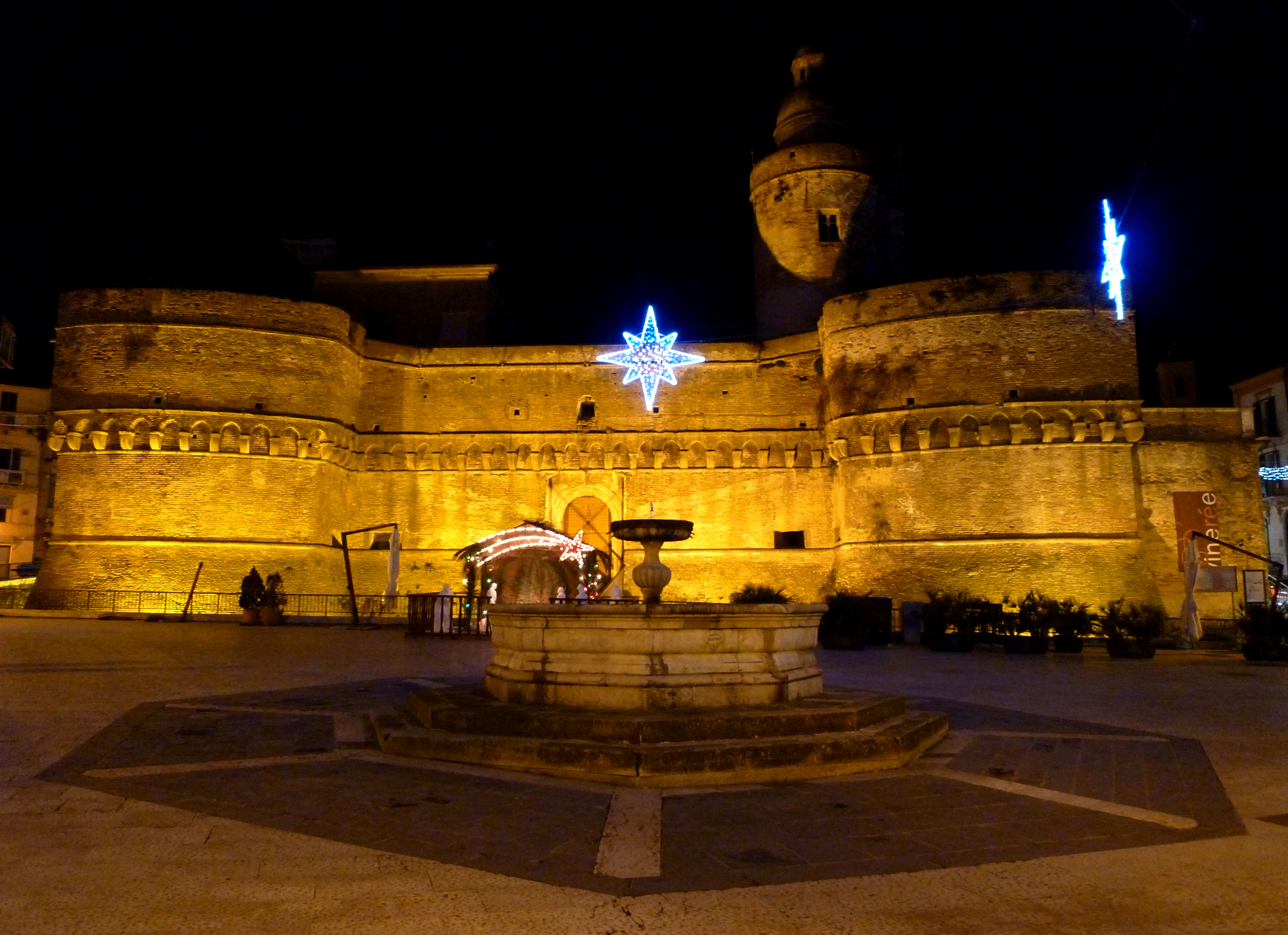
Night view of Castello Caldoresco

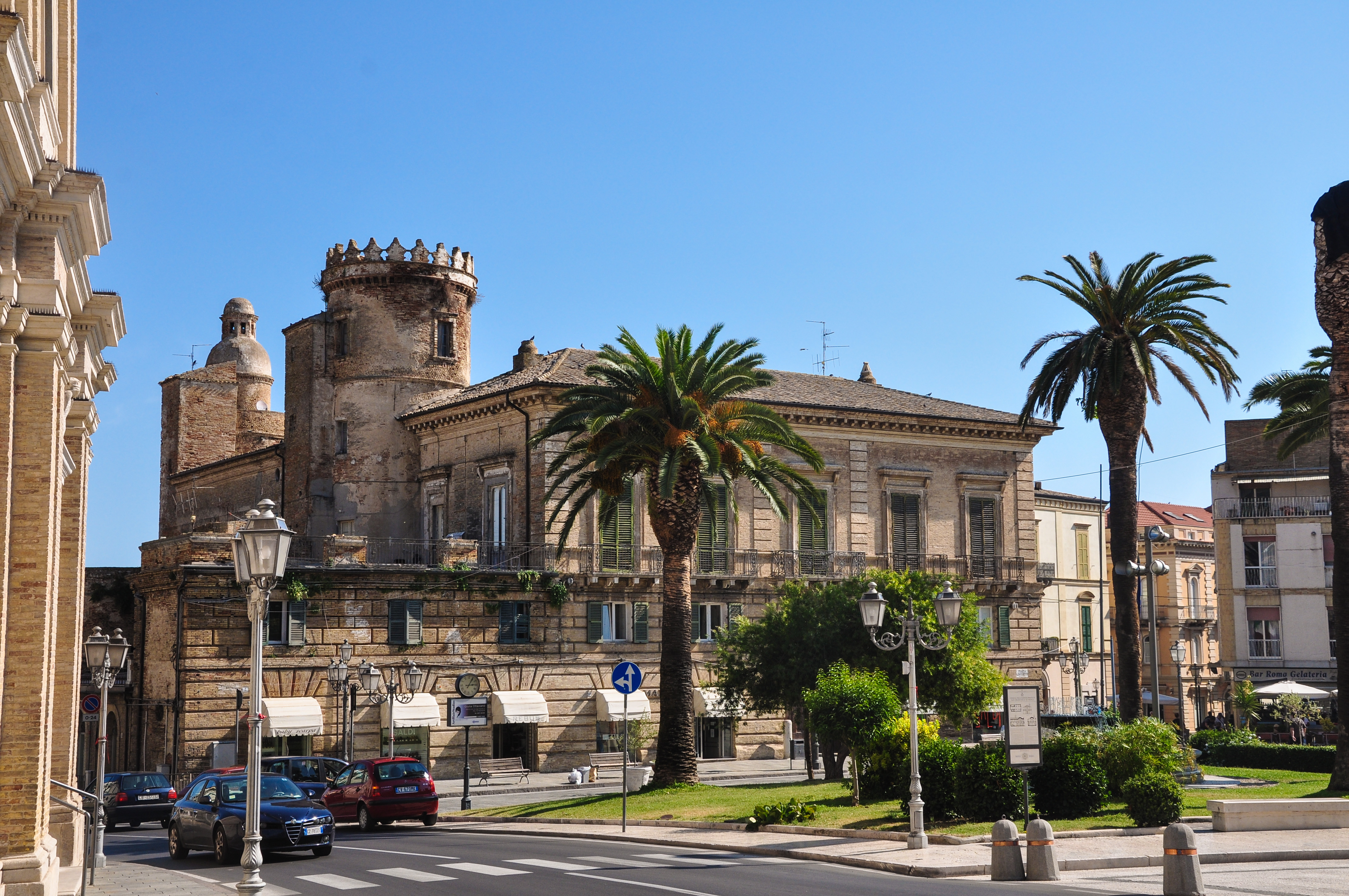
Piazza Rossetti

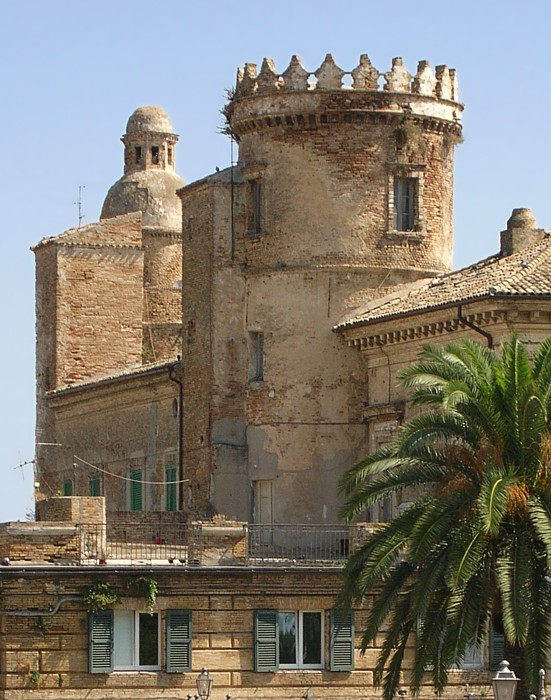
Castello Caldoresco
