= Vasto =

City in Abruzzo, Italy

- Comune
- Città del Vasto
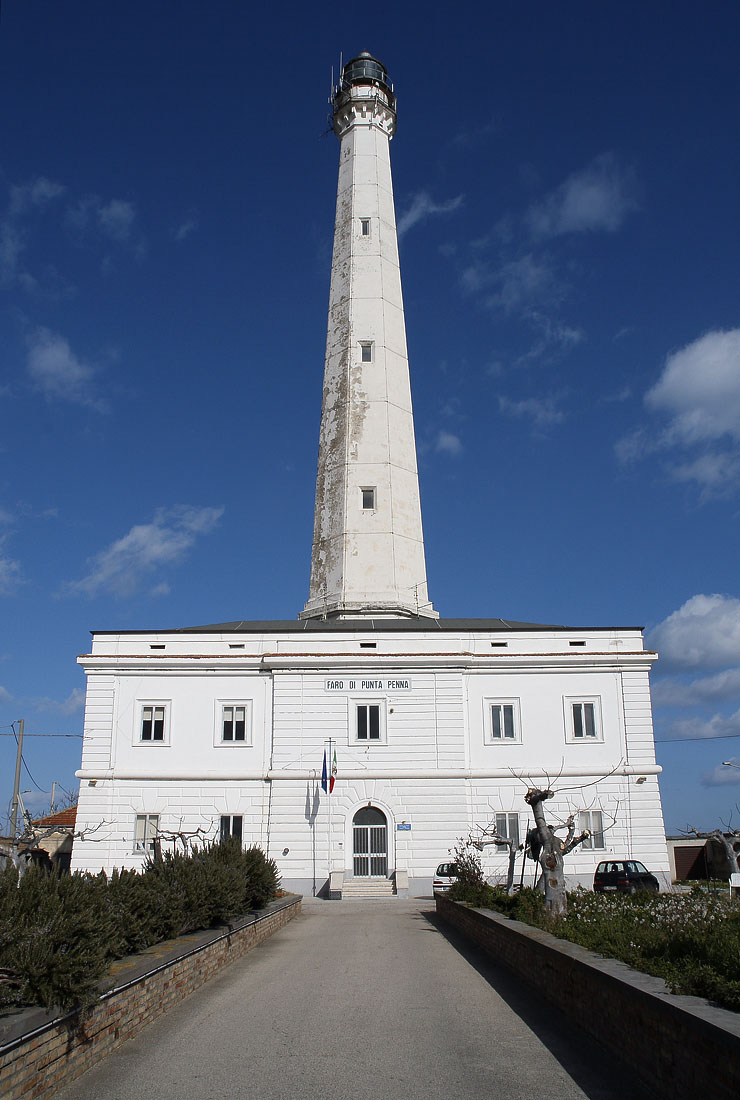
- Lighthouse of Punta Penna, the second tallest in Italy and seventh tallest in the world

- Flag Coat of arms

- Location within Italy Location within Abruzzo
- Coordinates: 42°07′00″N 14°42′25″E
- Country: Italy
- Region: Abruzzo
- Province: Chieti (CH)

Government
  - Mayor: Francesco Menna (Democratic Party)

Area
  - Total: 70.65 km^{2} (27.28 sq mi)
- Elevation: 138 m (453 ft)

Population (January 1, 2023)
  - Total: 40,692
  - Density: 576.0/km^{2} (1,492/sq mi)
- Demonym: Vastesi
- Time zone: UTC+1 (CET)
  - Summer (DST): UTC+2 (CEST)
- Postal code: 66054
- Dialing code: 0873
- Patron saint: Saint Michael
- Saint day: September 29
- Website: Official website

Vasto (Abruzzese: lù Uàštë; Ancient Greek: Ἱστόνιον, romanized: Histonion, Latin: Histonium) is a comune on the Adriatic coast of the Province of Chieti, in southern Abruzzo, Italy. During the Middle Ages it was called Guastaymonis, Vasto d'Aimone or Waste d'Aimone. Fascist Italy called the city Istonio, but it was renamed Vasto in 1944.

== History ==
=== Ancient period ===
According to legend, the town was founded by Diomedes, the Greek hero. The earliest archaeological relics date to 1300 BC. Histonium was one of the key towns of the Frentani, located on the Adriatic coast, about 9 kilometres (6 mi) south of the promontory called Punta Penna.

Ancient geographers cited the town as located in the territory of the Frentani and apparently under Julius Caesar did not obtain the rank of a colonia, but continued to bear the title of a municipium, as we learn from some inscriptions. Under the Roman Empire, the municipium of Histonium was a flourishing and opulent town, further attested by the existing ruins of an ancient Roman theatre, baths, and other public edifices, besides numerous mosaics, statues, and columns of granite or marble.

Among the numerous inscriptions which have been found, one of the most curious records the fact of a young boy named Lucius Valerius Pudens having at thirteen years of age won the prize for Latin poetry in the contest held at Rome in the temple of Jupiter Capitolinus. The name of Histonium is still found in the Itineraries of the fourth century and it probably never ceased to exist on its present site, though ravaged successively by the Goths, the Lombards, the Franks, and the Arabs.

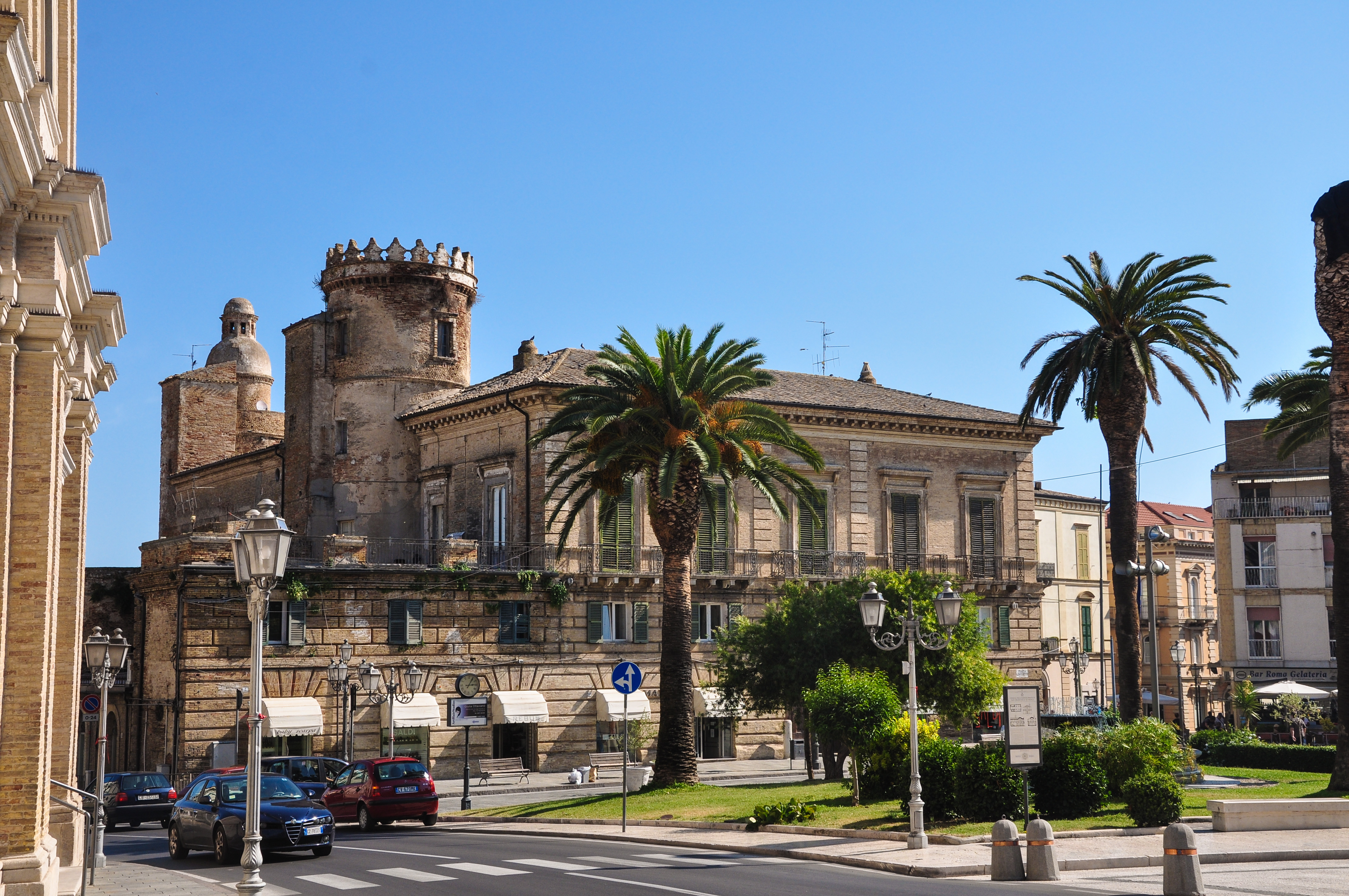
Castello Caldoresco in Piazza Rossetti

Histonium had no natural port, and it is not improbable that in the days of its prosperity it depended on the port at the Punta Penna, where the current harbour that is the Porto di Vasto and the lighthouse are located, where there is good anchorage, and where Roman remains have also been found, which have been regarded, but probably erroneously, as those of the settlement of Buca.

=== Middle Ages ===
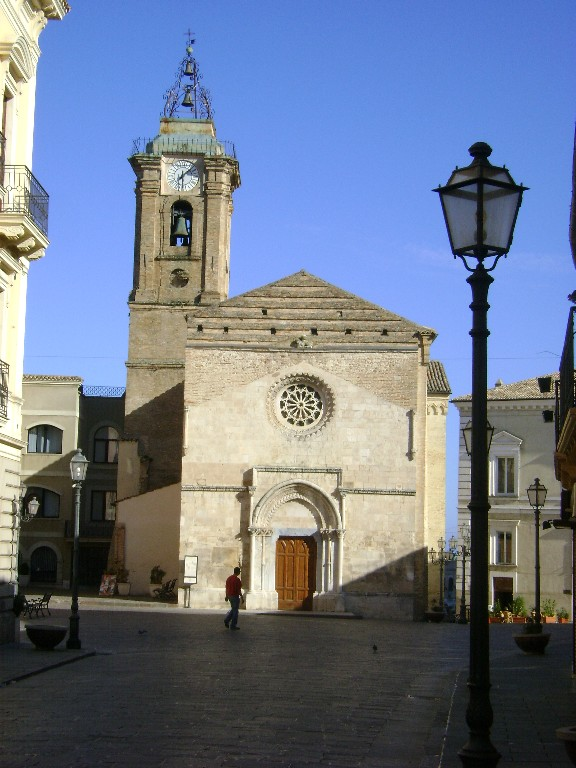
Cathedral of San Giuseppe

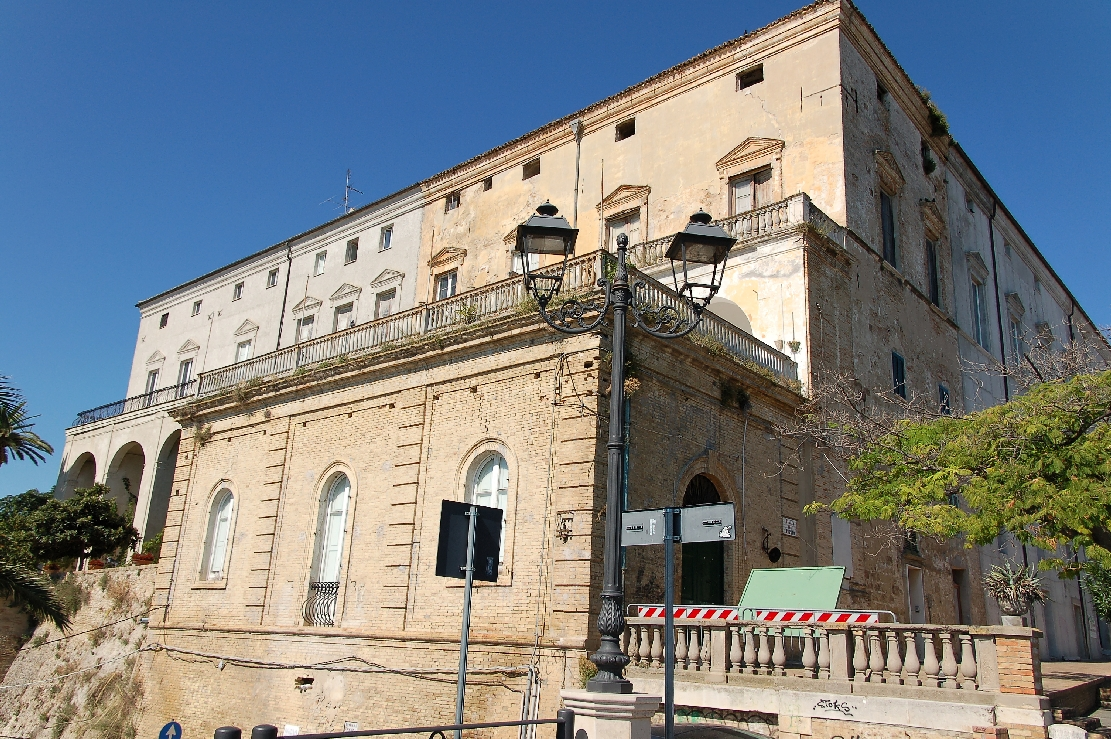
Palazzo d'Avalos

After the collapse of the Western Roman Empire, the region was occupied by Germanic tribes until Justinian's Byzantine re-conquest, which included the province of Samnium, of which Histonium was a key town. However soon after Justinian's death, Histonium fell to the Lombards and incorporated into the Duchy of Benevento. Later, circa 774 AD, the town was conquered by the Franks. Subsequently, in 1053, the Normans under Robert Guiscard in turn captured it along with the Duchy of Benevento. Around 1076, Histonium was renamed Guastaymonis, or the Waste of Aimone (Italian: Il Guasto d'Aimone), following raids, hence its current name. From the 13th century it was part of the Kingdom of Naples, which later merged into the Kingdom of the Two Sicilies.

In the 15th century the city's urban structure was transformed by the condottiero Giacomo Caldora, who had become its lord. The Caldora family built new city walls still seen today, including the Torre Bassano tower in Piazza Rossetti, the Torre Diomede in Vico Storto del Passero, the Torre Diamante in Piazza Verdi and Porta Catena, and with Castello Caldoresco as its primary defensive outpost.

In 1566, Turkish Ottoman naval forces, led by Piyale Pasha, destroyed much of the city by fire, including the Castello Caldoresco, the Church of Santa Margherita and the Palazzo d'Avalos (formerly a home of Vittoria Colonna – close confidante of Michelangelo – now the Musei di Palazzo d'Avalos).

=== From Spanish rule until Italy's Unification ===
Under the Spanish rule of southern Italy, Vasto became fief of the Marquis d'Avalos, and under the reign of Cesare Michelangelo (marquis from 1697 to 1729), Vasto reached its zenith. Only superficially shaken by revolutionary events in 1799 (a short-lived Republic of Vasto was immediately overthrown by the sanfedisti, or loyalists), the city's history was reflected in the nation's throughout the Restoration to the Unification of Italy when a liberal elite governed.

The poet and scholar Gabriele Rossetti was born in Vasto on 28 February 1783. Rossetti's published works include literary criticism, Romantic poetry such as his long poem Il Veggente in Solitudine of 1846, and his autobiography. Gabriele went into political exile in 1821, settling in London, England.

He was the father of well-known pre-Raphaelite painter Dante Gabriel Rossetti and poet Christina Rossetti. Gabriele died on 24 April 1854 and is buried in London's Highgate Cemetery with his wife Frances Polidori.

=== Modern ===
In the early 20th century, Vasto changed its architectural and urban features. The historical centre was redrawn and the foundations were set for drastic alterations during the 1920s and 1930s, with Mussolini decreeing a name change to Istonio in 1938, the official name until the liberation of the city by the Allied Forces in 1944.

Despite a devastating landslide (1956) that dragged a significant part of the eastern ridge – now Via Adriatica – into the gorge below, the years following World War II witnessed industrial, urban, and socio-cultural development. The city also discovered its tourist vocation: besides the progressive development of its beaches in Marina di Vasto, Roman-era thermal baths, mosaics, cisterns and remains of an amphitheatre were found and restored.

During the 1970s until the recent days, the town underwent a remarkable change and a fast growth, with several housing, road and other infrastructure projects built to accommodate the emigrating population from the inner areas of Southern Abruzzo, which have made it one of the most populous of the region.

== Main sights ==
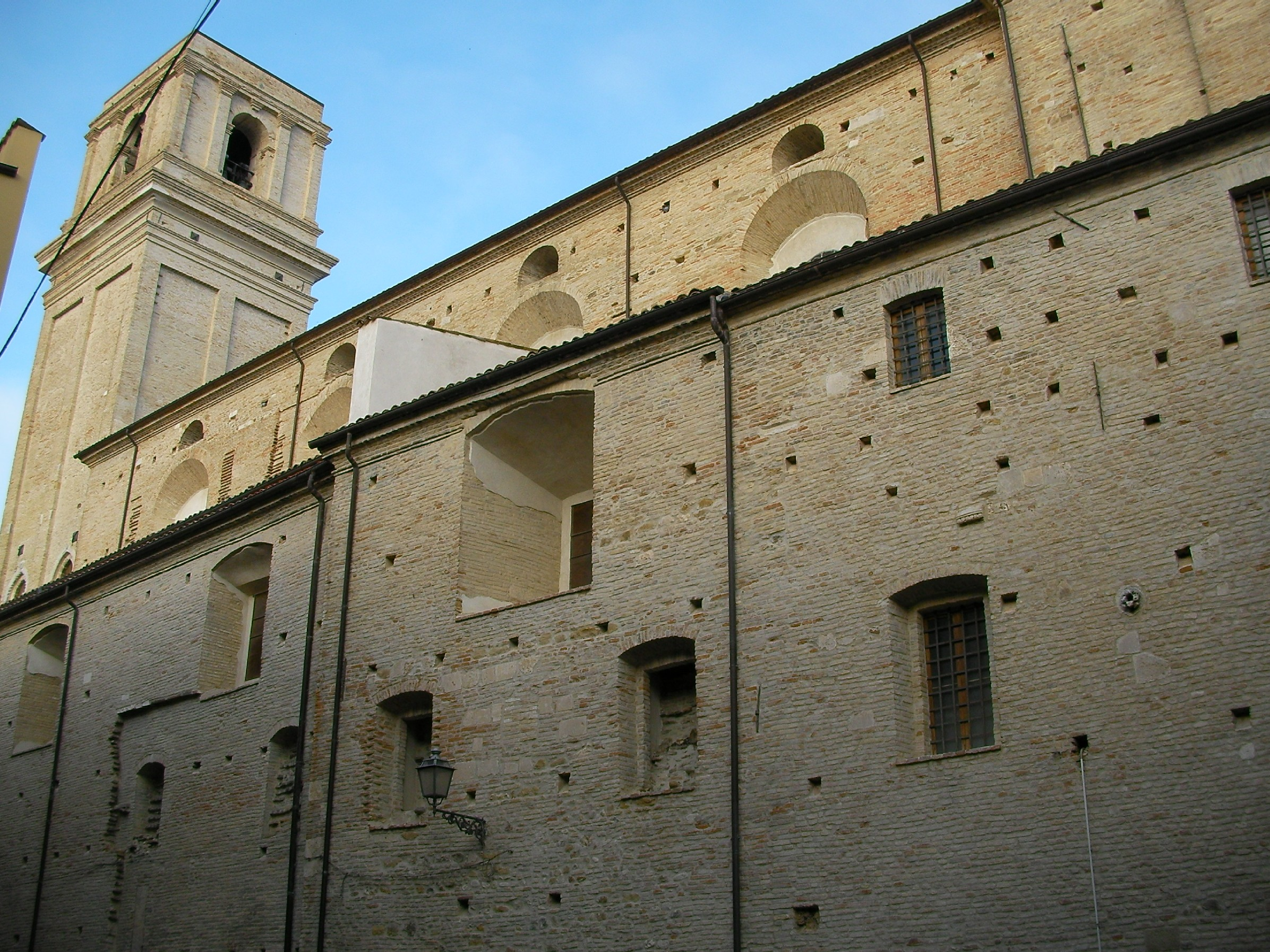
Santa Maria Maggiore

The old part of the town (centro storico) features a number of buildings and churches dating from the 12th-18th centuries, including:

- Vasto Cathedral (Cattedrale di San Giuseppe)
- Santa Maria Maggiore: largest and oldest (mentioned in a document as early as 1195) church in the town, with a quite tall bell tower. Damaged by the Turks in 1566, and by a fire in 1645, it received a thorough restructuring in 1735 in which it got the current shape. It hosts one of alleged Jesus' crown of thorns (Sacra Spina).
- Castello Caldoresco
- Palazzo D'Avalos: Imposing palace in the center of town, now houses the Civic Museums, including a museum of archeology and the town Art Gallery (Musei Civici)

Below the hill on which the town is located, the beach resort town of Marina di Vasto offers a large sandy beach and several hotels and other facilities.

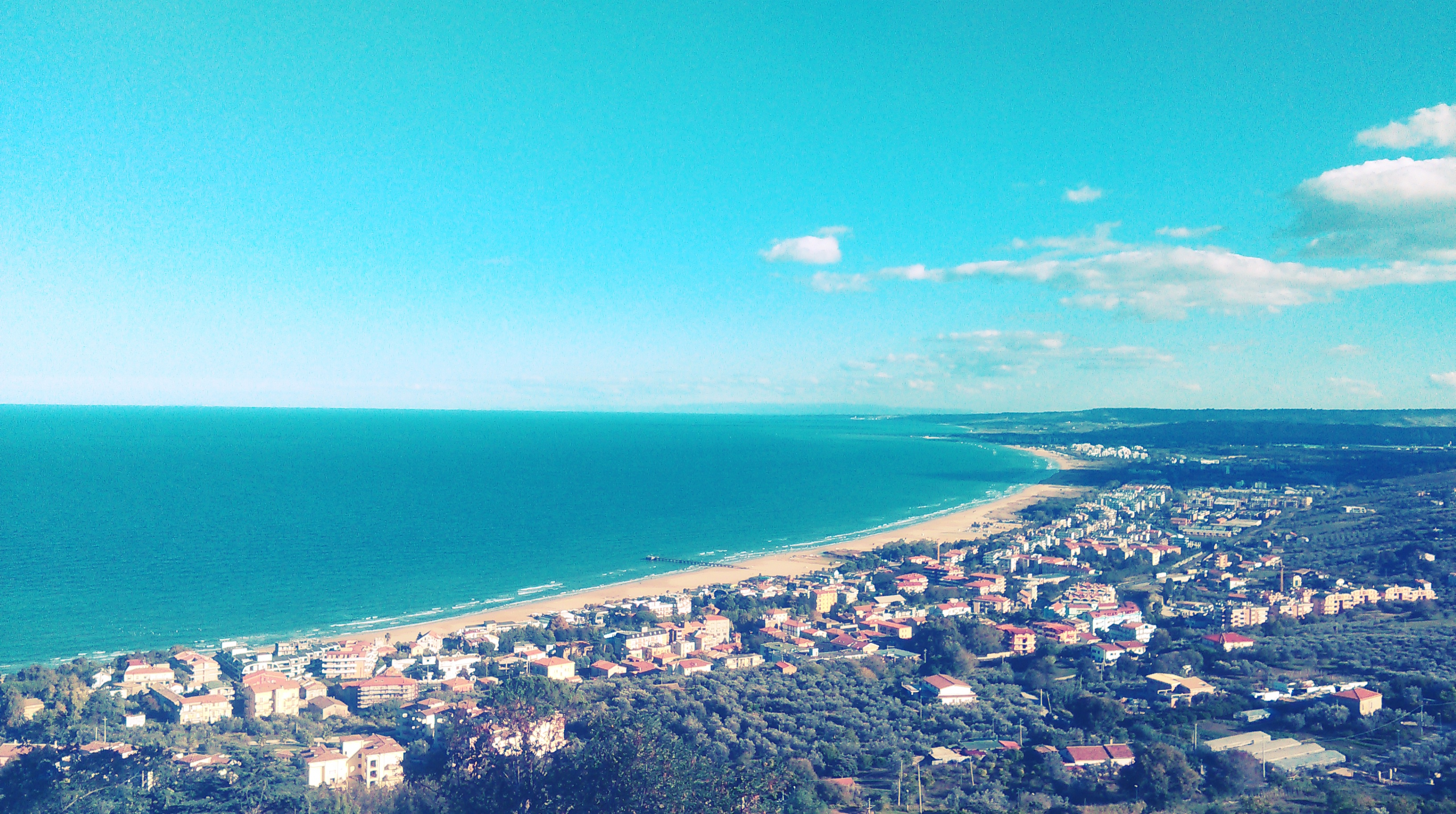
Marina di Vasto and the Golfo di Vasto in the Adriatic Sea, seen from Vasto

Further north the coast becomes rocky and features interesting pebble and stone beaches and coves, as well as the typical trabocchi, typical wooden fishing machines of the Southern Abruzzo coast. Amongst the natural areas, also featuring a number of sandy and rocky beaches, is the protected natural area of the Riserva Naturale di Punta Aderci, whose beaches were voted in 2014 third of the top 20 beaches in Italy.

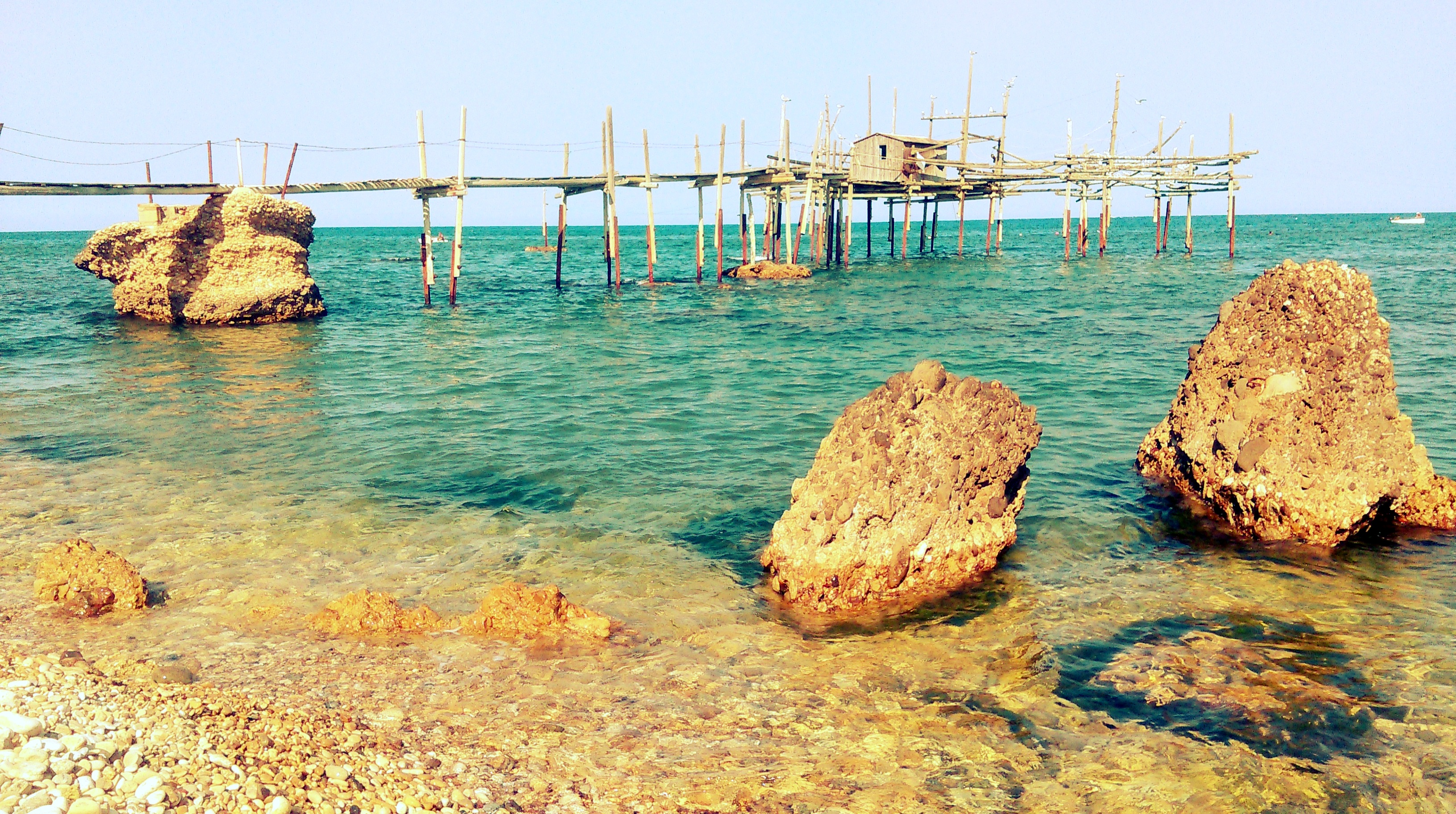
Trabocco

== Notable people from Vasto ==
- Gabriele Rossetti, scholar, founder of the secret society Carbonari.
- Vittorio Coccia, football player
- Andrea Iannone, motorcycle racer
- Valerico Laccetti, painter
- Filippo Palizzi, painter
- Francesco Romani, doctor
- Alessandra Smerilli, economist
- Giuseppe Spataro, politician

== Climate ==
Climate data for Vasto (1991–2020 normals, extremes 1951–2000)
Month	Jan	Feb	Mar	Apr	May	Jun	Jul	Aug	Sep	Oct	Nov	Dec	Year
Record high °C (°F)	23.0 (73.4)	24.5 (76.1)	28.0 (82.4)	29.1 (84.4)	34.8 (94.6)	38.4 (101.1)	40.2 (104.4)	42.5 (108.5)	38.5 (101.3)	33.2 (91.8)	27.2 (81.0)	24.3 (75.7)	42.5 (108.5)
Mean daily maximum °C (°F)	10.5 (50.9)	11.0 (51.8)	13.9 (57.0)	17.3 (63.1)	21.6 (70.9)	25.9 (78.6)	28.5 (83.3)	28.7 (83.7)	24.3 (75.7)	20.0 (68.0)	15.6 (60.1)	11.7 (53.1)	19.1 (66.4)
Daily mean °C (°F)	7.7 (45.9)	8.0 (46.4)	10.6 (51.1)	13.8 (56.8)	17.9 (64.2)	22.1 (71.8)	24.7 (76.5)	24.9 (76.8)	20.7 (69.3)	16.8 (62.2)	12.7 (54.9)	8.9 (48.0)	15.7 (60.3)
Mean daily minimum °C (°F)	4.9 (40.8)	5.0 (41.0)	7.2 (45.0)	10.2 (50.4)	14.2 (57.6)	18.4 (65.1)	21.0 (69.8)	21.1 (70.0)	17.1 (62.8)	13.6 (56.5)	9.7 (49.5)	6.2 (43.2)	12.4 (54.3)
Record low °C (°F)	−6.4 (20.5)	−6.8 (19.8)	−5.0 (23.0)	0.9 (33.6)	2.5 (36.5)	9.3 (48.7)	12.0 (53.6)	10.0 (50.0)	8.0 (46.4)	4.0 (39.2)	−8.0 (17.6)	−3.8 (25.2)	−8.0 (17.6)
Average precipitation mm (inches)	63.3 (2.49)	53.0 (2.09)	59.7 (2.35)	51.2 (2.02)	36.8 (1.45)	33.0 (1.30)	35.2 (1.39)	42.2 (1.66)	63.0 (2.48)	75.0 (2.95)	81.4 (3.20)	87.1 (3.43)	680.9 (26.81)
Average precipitation days	7.1	6.2	6.8	5.5	4.8	3.7	3.3	3.7	4.9	6.6	7.8	7.7	68.1
Source 1: Istituto Superiore per la Protezione e la Ricerca Ambientale
Source 2: Regione Abruzzo (precipitation and extremes 1951–2000)

== Twinnings ==
- Perth, Australia, since 1989

== See also ==
- Vastese, a Romance language from this town
- Punta Penna Lighthouse
