= Haec sancta synodus =

1415 document regarding papal supremacy

The decree Haec sancta synodus ("This holy synod"), also called Haec sancta, was promulgated by the fifth session of the Council of Constance on April 6, 1415. It contains a section on the question of whether the Pope is above an ecumenical council or, conversely, such a council is above the Pope. The question is related to papal primacy, papal supremacy and conciliarism.

The decree played an essential role in shaping conciliarism.

== Excerpt on supremacy of an ecumenical council ==
The section concerning the supremacy of a council over the pope and any clergy member reads:

| Official text | English translation |
|---|---|
| Et primo (declarat), quod ipsa in spiritu sancto legitime congregata concilium generale faciens, et ecclesiam catholicam militantem repraesentans, potestatem a Christo immediate habet, cui quilibet cuiuscumque status vel dignitatis, etiam si papalis existat, obedire tenetur in his quae pertinent ad fidem et extirpationem dicti schismatis, ac reformationem dictae ecclesiae in capite et in membris. | First [the council] declares that, legitimately assembled in the holy Spirit, constituting a general council and representing the catholic church militant, it has power immediately from Christ; and that everyone of whatever state or dignity, even papal, is bound to obey it in those matters which pertain to the faith, the eradication of the said schism and the general reform of the said church of God in head and members. |

== Opinions on the decree ==
In theology, "[t]he range of interpretations [of Haec sancta] is large. It ranges from the qualification of the decree as a dogma via the so-called 'necessity theory', to the thesis of minimizing its theological content to that of a legal decree, not a doctrinal statement, which is mainly due to the way the language of the text is opened up".

== See also ==
- Frequens
- Conciliarity
