= Punta Penna Lighthouse =

Lighthouse in Vasto, Italy

Punta Penna
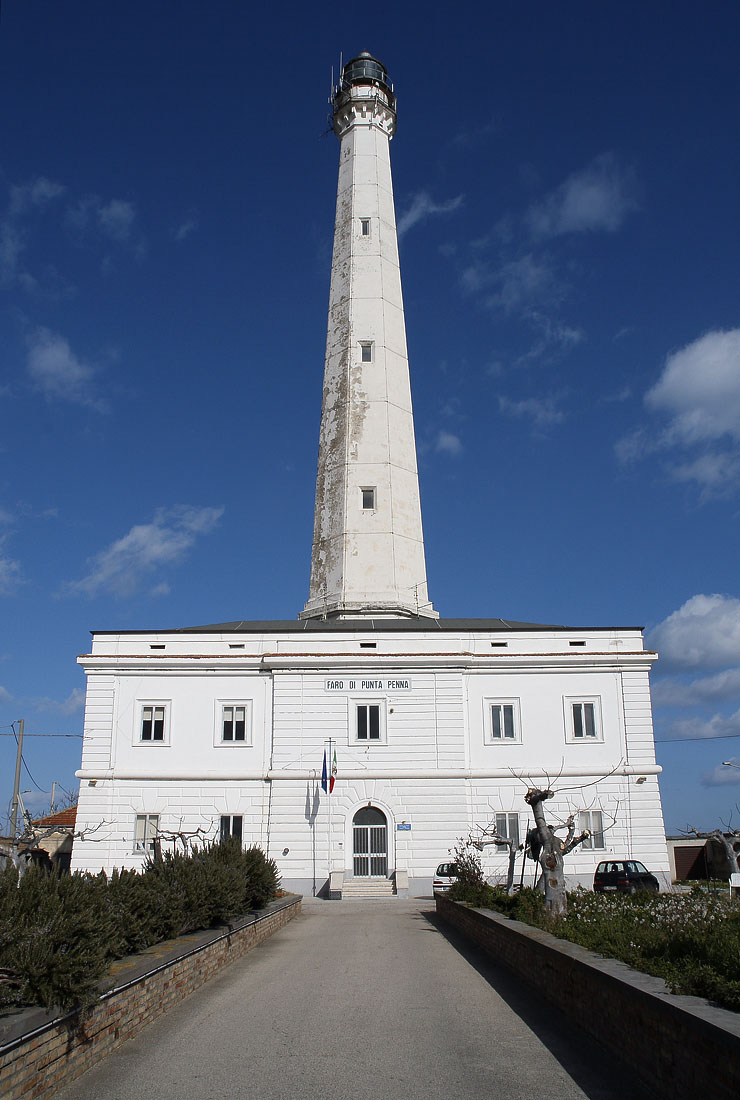
- Punta Penna Lighthouse in 2007
- Location: Vasto; Abruzzo; Italy
- Coordinates: 42°10′16″N 14°42′53″E

Tower
- Constructed: 1906 (first)
- Foundation: 2-story masonry keeper's house
- Construction: concrete tower
- Height: 70 metres (230 ft)
- Shape: octagonal tower with balcony and lantern
- Markings: white tower and lantern, gray metallic lantern dome
- Operator: Marina Militare

Light
- First lit: 1948 (current)
- Focal height: 84 m (277 ft)
- Lens: Type OR 500 focal length: 250 mm
- Light source: main power
- Intensity: main: AL 1000 W reserve: LABI 100 W
- Range: main: 25 nmi (46 km; 29 mi); 18 nmi (33 km; 21 mi)
- Characteristic: Fl W 5s
- Italy no.: 3856 E.F

Punta Penna Lighthouse (Italian: Faro di Punta Penna) is an active lighthouse in Vasto, Italy. At a height of 70 metres (230 ft) it is the eighth tallest "traditional lighthouse" in the world, and the second tallest lighthouse in Italy after the Lantern of Genoa. It is located at a strategically important spot in Via Madonna della Penna at the port of Vasto.

== History ==
Built in 1906, it has been repeatedly reconstructed. In 1944, the retreating German army destroyed part of the old lighthouse and it was demolished. Reconstruction started in 1946, working from the design of the architect Olindo Tarcione; it reopened on 2 May 1948.

The lighthouse is unusual as it looks like a regular brick building with a two-story base which provided housing for the light keeper family and also houses some administrative offices.

A spiral staircase of 307 steps leads up to the summit.

== See also ==
- List of tallest lighthouses in the world
- List of lighthouses in Italy
