= Council of Constance =

Resolution of the Western Schism

Coordinates: 47°39′48″N 9°10′37″E

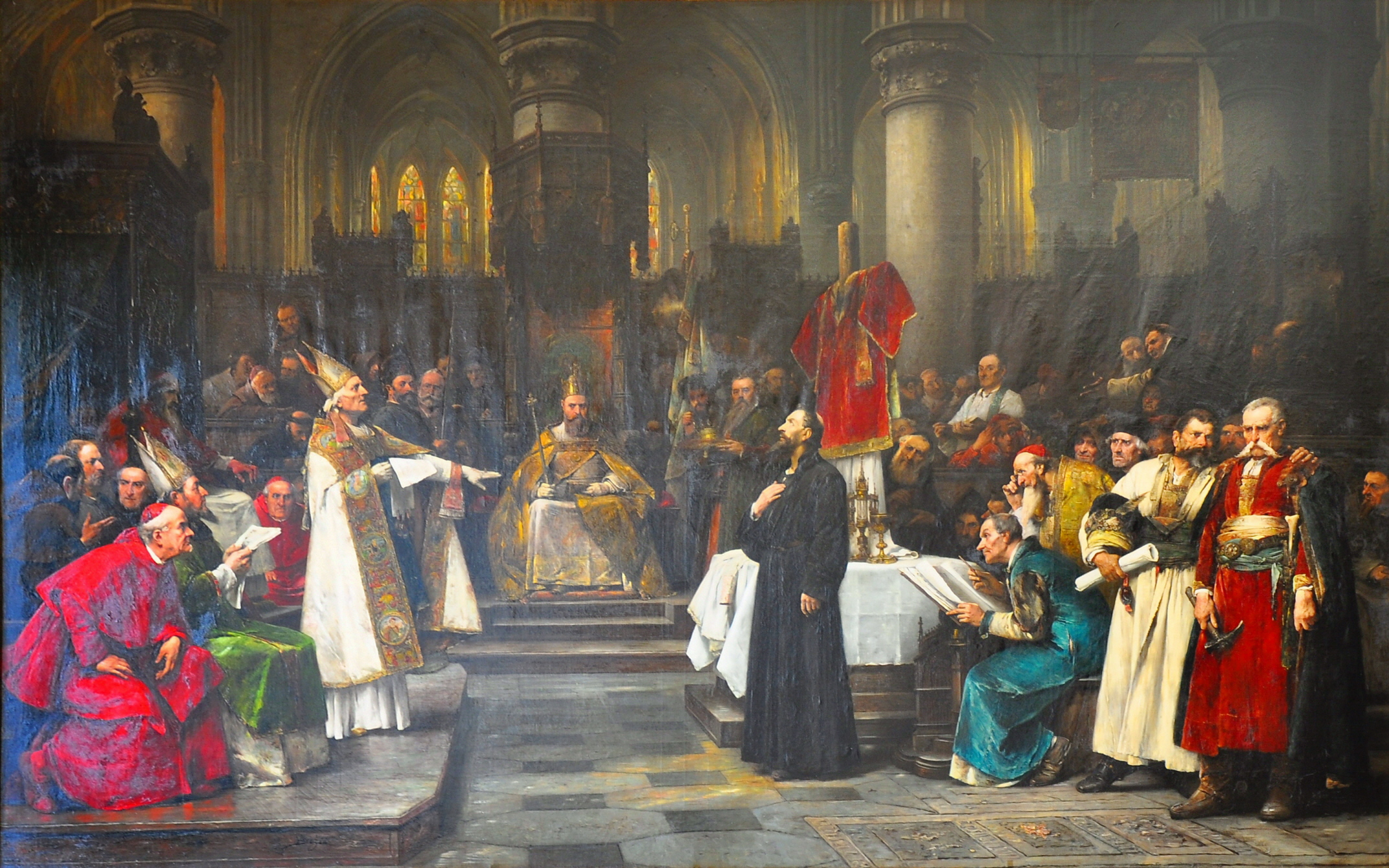
- Jan Hus before the Council of Constance, 1883 painting by Václav Brožík
- Date: 1414–1418
- Accepted by: Catholic Church; Old Catholic Church; Traditional Catholic Churches
- Previous council: Council of Vienne
- Next council: Council of Florence
- Convoked by: Sigismund and Antipope John XXIII, confirmed by Pope Gregory XII
- President: Legates of Pope Gregory XII (Giovanni Dominici and Carlo Malatesta)
- Attendance: About 600
- Topics: Hussites, conciliarism, Western Schism
- Documents and statements: Deposition of Antipopes Benedict XIII and John XXIII, condemnation of Jan Hus, election of Pope Martin V, Haec sancta synodus, Frequens

The Council of Constance (Latin: Concilium Constantiense; German: Konzil von Konstanz) was an ecumenical council of the Catholic Church that was held from 1414 to 1418 in the Bishopric of Constance (Konstanz) in present-day Germany. This was the first ecumenical council convened in the Holy Roman Empire. The council ended the Western Schism by deposing or accepting the resignation of the remaining papal claimants and by electing Pope Martin V. It was the last papal election to take place outside of the Italian peninsula.

The council also condemned Jan Hus as a heretic and facilitated his execution; and it ruled on issues of national sovereignty and the rights of pagans and just war in response to a conflict between the Grand Duchy of Lithuania, the Kingdom of Poland and the Order of the Teutonic Knights.

The council is also important for its role in the debates over ecclesial conciliarism and papal supremacy. Constance issued two particularly significant decrees regarding the constitution of the Catholic Church: Haec sancta (1415), which asserted the superiority of ecumenical councils over popes in at least certain situations, and Frequens (1417), which provided for councils to be held automatically every ten years. The status of these decrees proved controversial in the centuries after the council, and Frequens was never put into practice; Haec sancta, at least, continued to be accepted as binding by much of the church up to the 19th century. Modern Catholic theologians generally regard these decrees as either invalid or as practical responses to a particular situation without wider implications.

== Origin and background ==
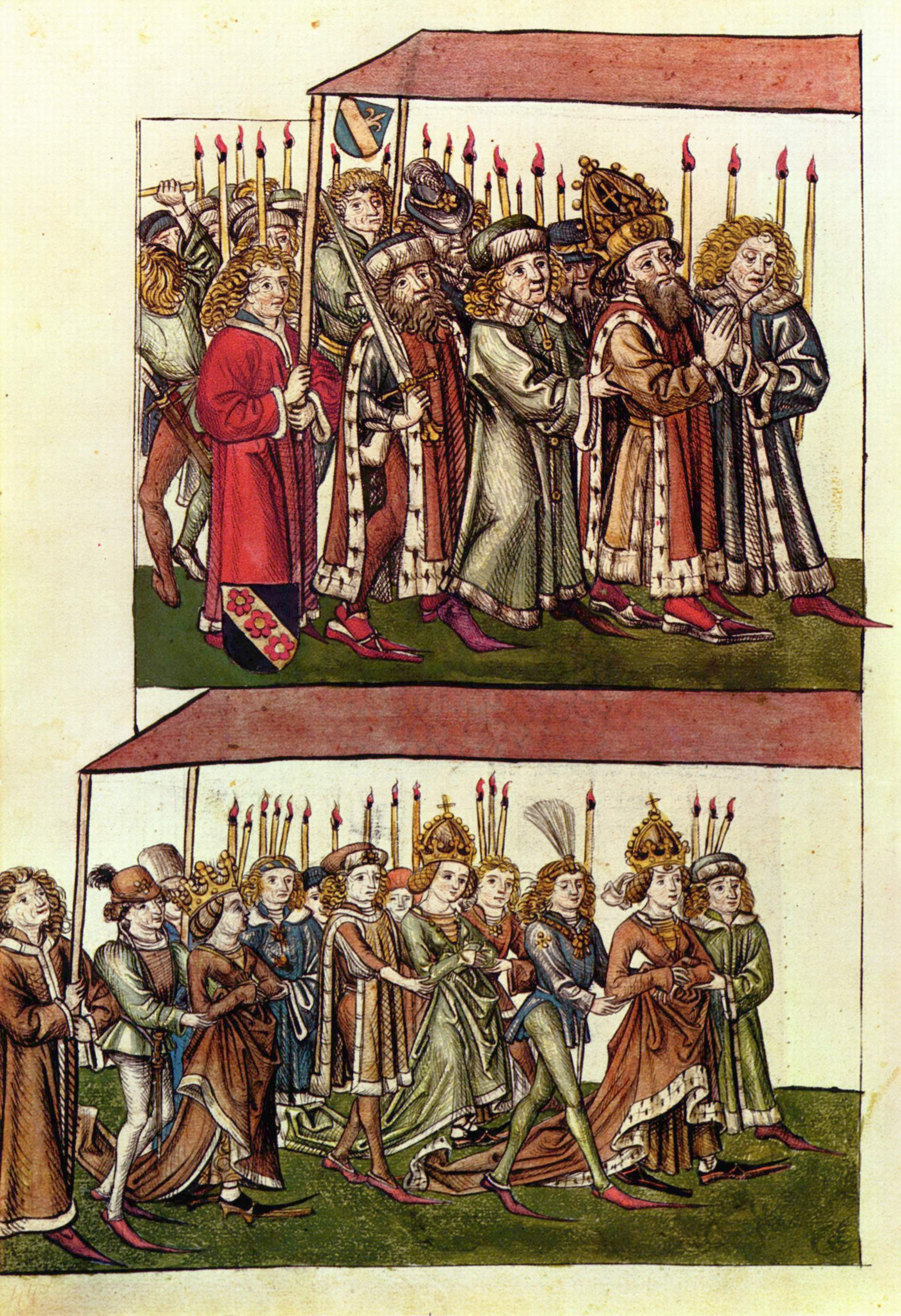
Sigismund, King of the Romans and of Hungary, his second wife, Barbara of Celje, and their daughter, Elizabeth of Luxembourg, at the Council of Constance

The council's main purpose was to end the Papal schism that had resulted from the confusion following the Avignon Papacy. Pope Gregory XI's return to Rome in 1377, followed by his death (in 1378) and the controversial election of his successor, Pope Urban VI, resulted in the defection of a number of cardinals and the election of a rival pope based at Avignon in 1378. After thirty years of schism, the rival courts convened the Council of Pisa, seeking to resolve the situation by deposing the two claimant popes and electing a new one. The council claimed that, in such a situation, a council of bishops had greater authority than just one bishop, even if he were the bishop of Rome. Though the elected Antipope Alexander V and his successor, Antipope John XXIII (not to be confused with the 20th-century Pope John XXIII), gained widespread support, especially at the cost of the Avignon antipope, the schism remained, now involving not two but three claimants: Gregory XII at Rome, Benedict XIII at Avignon, and John XXIII.

Therefore, many voices, including Sigismund, King of the Romans and of Hungary (and later Holy Roman Emperor), pressed for another council to resolve the issue. That council was called by John XXIII and was held from 16 November 1414 to 22 April 1418 in Constance, Germany. The council was attended by roughly 29 cardinals, 100 "learned doctors of law and divinity", 134 abbots, and 183 bishops and archbishops.

== Participants ==
Sigismund arrived on Christmas Eve 1414 and exercised a profound and continuous influence on the course of the council in his capacity of imperial protector of the church.

An innovation at the council was that instead of voting as individuals, the bishops voted in national blocs. The vote by nations was in great measure the initiative of the English, German, and French members. The legality of this measure, in imitation of the "nations" of the universities, was more than questionable, but during February 1415 it carried and thenceforth was accepted in practice, though never authorized by any formal decree of the council.

The four "nations" consisted of England, France, Italy, and Germany, with Poles, Hungarians, Danes, and Scandinavians counted with the Germans. While the Italian representatives made up half of those in attendance, they were equal in influence to the English, who sent twenty deputies and three bishops. The Spanish deputies (from Portugal, Castile, Navarre and Aragon), initially absent, joined the council at the twenty-first session, constituting upon arrival the fifth nation.

== Decrees and doctrinal status ==
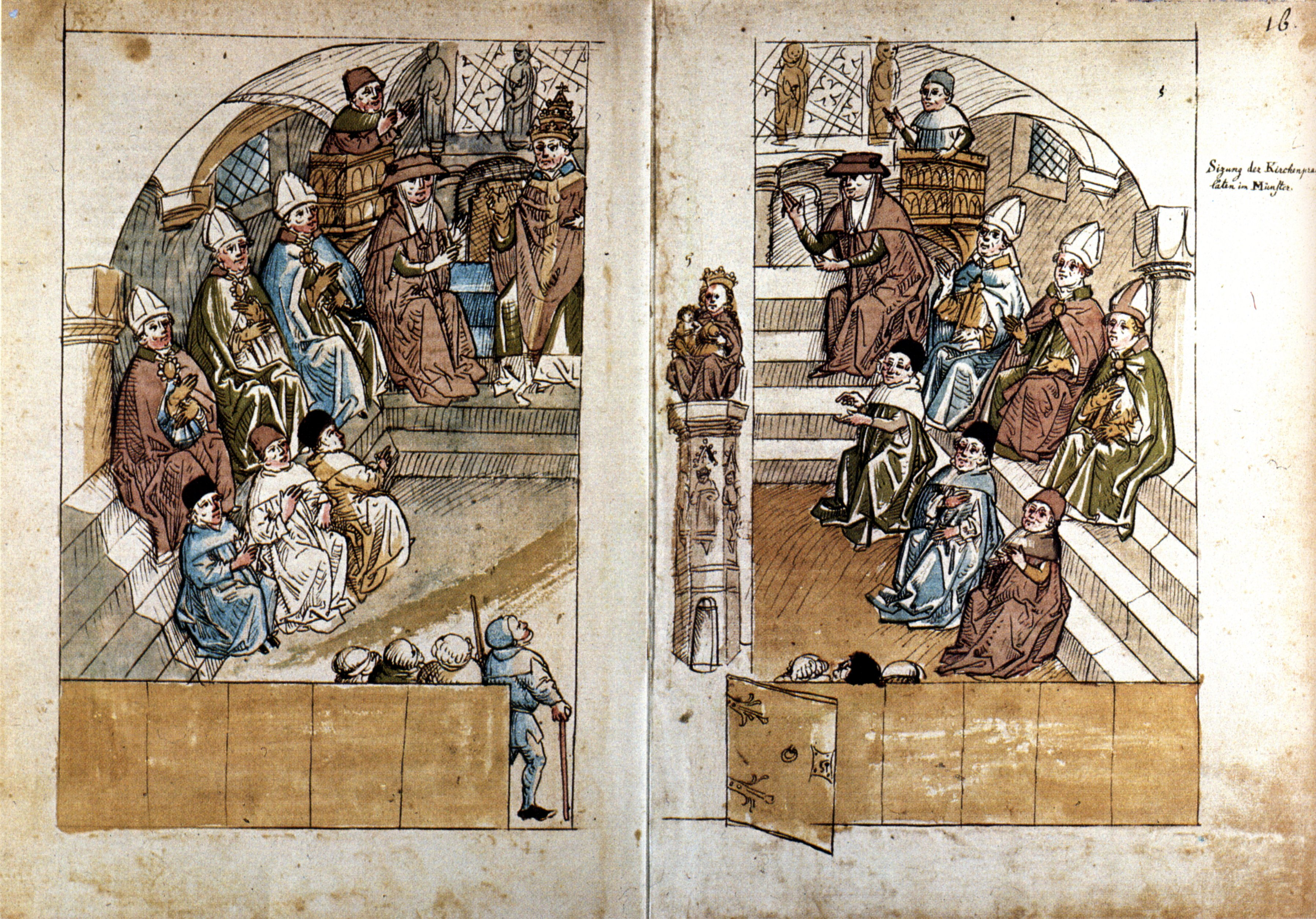
Bishops debating with the pope at the Council of Constance

Many members of the new assembly (comparatively few bishops, but many doctors of theology and of canon and civil law, procurators of bishops, deputies of universities, cathedral chapters, provosts, etc., agents and representatives of princes, etc.) strongly favored the voluntary abdication of all three popes, as did King Sigismund.

Although the Italian bishops who had accompanied John XXIII in large numbers supported his legitimacy, he grew increasingly more suspicious of the council. Partly in response to a fierce anonymous attack on his character from an Italian source, on 2 March 1415 he promised to resign. However, on 20 March he secretly fled the city and took refuge at Schaffhausen in territory of his friend Frederick, Duke of Austria-Tyrol.

The famous decree Haec sancta synodus, which gave primacy to the authority of the council and thus became a source for ecclesial conciliarism, was promulgated in the fifth session, 6 April 1415:

Legitimately assembled in the holy Spirit, constituting a general council and representing the Catholic church militant, it has power immediately from Christ; and everyone of whatever state or dignity, even papal, is bound to obey it in those matters which pertain to the faith, the eradication of the said schism, and the general reform of the said church of God in head and members.

Haec sancta synodus marks the high-water mark of the Conciliar movement of reform. (Note: For good, brief discussions of the politics of conciliarism at and after Constance, see Black 1998, pp. 67–76 and Watts 2009, pp. 291–301)

The acts of the council were not made public until 1442, at the behest of the Council of Basel; they were printed in 1500. The creation of a book on how to die was ordered by the council, and thus written in 1415 under the title Ars moriendi.

Haec sancta is today generally considered invalid by the Catholic Church, on the basis that Gregory XII was the legitimate pope at the time and the decree was passed by the council in a session before his confirmation. On this reading, the first sessions of the Council of Constance represented an invalid and illicit assembly of bishops, gathered under the authority of an antipope. This historiography is of much later provenance than the council itself, however: the Pisan line represented by John XXIII had been considered legitimate not just by most of the Latin church at the time of the council, but also subsequently by Pope Martin V, who referred to John as "our predecessor" in contrast to the other two claimants, who were merely "popes so-called in their obediences". The specific argument distinguishing two parts in the council was seemingly first made by the 17th-century Sorbonne theologian André Duval, and remained a fringe view for some time before its vindication within the Catholic Church under the influence of 19th-century ultramontanism.

== Ending the Western Schism ==
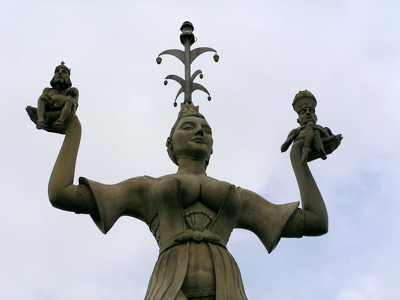
Imperia, erected in 1993 to commemorate the Council

With the support of King Sigismund, enthroned before the high altar of the cathedral of Constance, the Council of Constance recommended that all three papal claimants abdicate, and that another be chosen. In part because of the constant presence of the King, other rulers demanded that they have a say in who would be pope.

Gregory XII then sent representatives to Constance, whom he granted full powers to summon, open, and preside over an Ecumenical Council; he also empowered them to present his resignation of the papacy. This would pave the way for the end of the Western Schism.

The legates were received by King Sigismund and by the assembled Bishops, and the King yielded the presidency of the proceedings to the papal legates, Cardinal Giovanni Dominici of Ragusa and Prince Carlo Malatesta. On 4 July 1415 the Bull of Gregory XII which appointed Dominici and Malatesta as his proxies at the council was formally read before the assembled Bishops. The cardinal then read a decree of Gregory XII which convoked the council and authorized its succeeding acts. Thereupon, the Bishops voted to accept the summons. Prince Malatesta immediately informed the council that he was empowered by a commission from Pope Gregory XII to resign the Papal Throne on the Pontiff's behalf. He asked the council whether they would prefer to receive the abdication at that point or at a later date. The Bishops voted to receive the Papal abdication immediately. Thereupon the commission by Gregory XII authorizing his proxy to resign the Papacy on his behalf was read and Malatesta, acting in the name of Gregory XII, pronounced the resignation of the papacy by Gregory XII and handed a written copy of the resignation to the assembly.

Former Pope Gregory XII was then created titular Cardinal Bishop of Porto and Santa Ruffina by the council, with rank immediately below the Pope (which made him the highest-ranking person in the church, since, due to his abdication, the See of Peter in Rome was vacant). Gregory XII's cardinals were accepted as true cardinals by the council, but the members of the council delayed electing a new pope for fear that a new pope would restrict further discussion of pressing issues in the church.

By the time the anti-popes were all deposed and the new Pope, Martin V, was elected, two years had passed since Gregory XII's abdication, and Gregory was already dead. The council took great care to protect the legitimacy of the succession, ratified all his acts, and a new pontiff was chosen. The new pope, Martin V, elected November 1417, soon asserted the absolute authority of the papal office.

== Condemnation of Jan Hus ==
A second goal of the council was to continue the reforms begun at the Council of Pisa (1409). The reforms were largely directed against John Wycliffe, mentioned in the opening session and condemned in the eighth on 4 May 1415, and Jan Hus, along with their followers. Hus, summoned to Constance under a letter of safe conduct, was found guilty of heresy by the council and turned over to the secular court. "This holy synod of Constance, seeing that God's church has nothing more that it can do, relinquishes Jan Hus to the judgment of the secular authority and decrees that he is to be relinquished to the secular court." (Council of Constance Session 15 – 6 July 1415). The secular court sentenced him to be burned to death at the stake.

Jerome of Prague, a supporter of Hus, came to Constance to offer assistance but was similarly arrested, judged, found guilty of heresy and turned over to the same secular court, with the same outcome as Hus. Poggio Bracciolini attended the council and related the unfairness of the process against Jerome.

Paweł Włodkowic and the other Polish representatives to the Council of Constance publicly defended Hus.

== Polish–Lithuanian–Teutonic conflict ==
In 1411, the First Peace of Thorn ended the Polish–Lithuanian–Teutonic War, in which the Teutonic Knights fought the Kingdom of Poland and Grand Duchy of Lithuania. However, the peace was not stable and further conflicts arose regarding demarcation of the Samogitian borders. The tensions erupted into the brief Hunger War in summer 1414. It was concluded that the disputes would be mediated by the Council of Constance.

The Polish-Lithuanian position was defended by Paulus Vladimiri, rector of the Jagiellonian University, who challenged legality of the Teutonic crusade against Lithuania. He argued that a forced conversion was incompatible with free will, which was an essential component of a genuine conversion. Therefore, the Knights could only wage a defensive war if pagans violated natural rights of the Christians. Vladimiri further stipulated that infidels had rights which had to be respected, and neither the Pope nor the Holy Roman Emperor had the authority to violate them. Lithuanians also brought a group of Samogitian representatives to testify to atrocities committed by the Knights.

The Dominican theologian John of Falkenberg proved to be the fiercest opponent of the Poles. In his Liber de doctrina, Falkenberg argued that

the Emperor has the right to slay even peaceful infidels simply because they are pagans. ... The Poles deserve death for defending infidels, and should be exterminated even more than the infidels; they should be deprived of their sovereignty and reduced to slavery.

In Satira, he attacked Polish-Lithuanian King Jogaila, calling him a "mad dog" unworthy to be king. Falkenberg was condemned and imprisoned for such libel. Other opponents included Grand Master's proctor Peter Wormditt, Dominic of San Gimignano, John Urbach, Ardecino de Porta of Novara, and Bishop of Ciudad Rodrigo Andrew Escobar. They argued that the Knights were perfectly justified in their crusade as it was a sacred duty of Christians to spread the true faith. Cardinal Pierre d'Ailly published an independent opinion that attempted to somewhat balance both Polish and Teutonic positions.

The council established the Diocese of Samogitia, with its seat in Medininkai and subordinated to Lithuanian dioceses, and appointed Matthias of Trakai as the first bishop. Pope Martin V appointed the Lithuanians Jogaila and Vytautas, who were respectively King of Poland and Grand Duke of Lithuania, as vicars general in Pskov and Veliky Novgorod in recognition of their Catholicism. After another round of futile negotiations, the Gollub War broke out in 1422. It ended with the Treaty of Melno. Polish-Lithuanian-Teutonic wars continued for another hundred years.

== Later status ==
Although Pope Martin V did not directly challenge the decrees of the council, his successor Eugene IV repudiated an attempt by a faction at the Council of Basel to declare the provisions of Haec sancta and Frequens a matter of faith. His 1439 bull on the matter, Moyses vir Dei, was underwritten by the Council of Florence. In convening the Fifth Lateran Council (1512–17), Pope Julius II further pronounced that Frequens had lost its force; Lateran V is sometimes seen as having itself abrogated Haec sancta, though the reading is controversial. Either way, while Rome itself came to reject the provisions made by the council, significant parts of the Church, notably in France, continued to uphold the validity of its decisions long after the event: Haec sancta was reaffirmed in the Gallican Articles of 1682, and even during the First Vatican Council of 1869–70 the French-American bishop of St. Augustine, Florida, Augustin Vérot, attempted to read Haec sancta into the record of deliberations.

Despite the apparently definitive rejection of conciliarism at the First Vatican Council, the debate over the status of Constance was renewed in the 20th century. In the 1960s, in the context of the Second Vatican Council, the reformist Catholic theologian Hans Küng and the historian Paul de Vooght argued in defense of the dogmatic character of Haec sancta, suggesting that its terms could be reconciled with the definition of papal supremacy at Vatican I. Küng's argument received support from prelates such as Cardinal Franz König. Other Catholic historians adopted different views: Hubert Jedin considered Haec sancta to be an emergency measure with no binding validity beyond its immediate context, while Joseph Gill rejected the validity of the session that passed the decree altogether. The debate over Haec sancta subsided in the 1970s, however, without resolution.

== See also ==
- Theodoric Vrie, historian of the Council
