= Cardinals created by Martin V =

Catholic appointments from 1419 to 1430

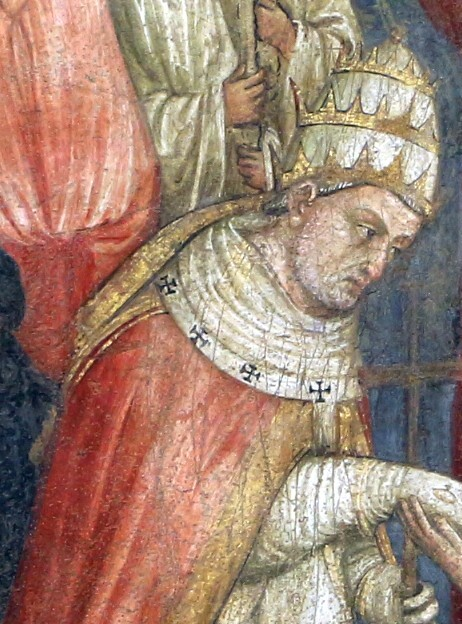
Pope Martin V (r. 1417–1431)

Pope Martin V (r. 1417–1431) created seventeen cardinals in four consistories held throughout his pontificate. He remade Baldassare Cossa - the reconciled former Antipope John XXIII as a cardinal. It is said that the pope was the first one to name cardinals without "publishing" them at the same time and so these creations differed than those kept in pectore. The latter ones are known to the pope alone while the former are known to the College of Cardinals. The two he named in 1423 are examples of this in addition to two in 1426 and another two in 1430. Those reserved in 1426 were announced in 1430 while one in 1430 was revealed on 4 July 1431 and another was revealed later on 11 March 1432 both by Pope Eugene IV.

== 23 June 1419 ==
- Baldassare Cossa

== 23 July 1423 ==
- Domingo Ram I Lanaja Can. Reg. O.S.A.
- Domenico Capranica

== 24 May 1426 ==
- Jean de la Rochetaillée
- Louis Aleman C.R.S.J.
- Henry Beaufort
- Johann von Bucka O.Praem.
- Antonio Casini
- Niccolò Albergati O.Carth.
- Raimond Mairose
- Juan de Cervantes
- Ardicino della Porta, seniore
- Hugues de Lusignan
- Prospero Colonna
- Giuliano Cesarini seniore

== 8 November 1430 ==
- Juan Casanova O.P.
- Guillaume de Montfort

== Others ==
The pope was said to have decided to have - in 1424 - made the priest Stefano Mucciarelli O.S.M. as a cardinal but he died before this could be done. The same could be said for the priest Leonardo Dati O.P. who was to have been made a cardinal on 16 March 1425 but he too died before this could take effect.
