= Santa Maria Maggiore, Vasto =

Church building in Vasto, Italy

Coordinates: 42.110918°N 14.709085°E

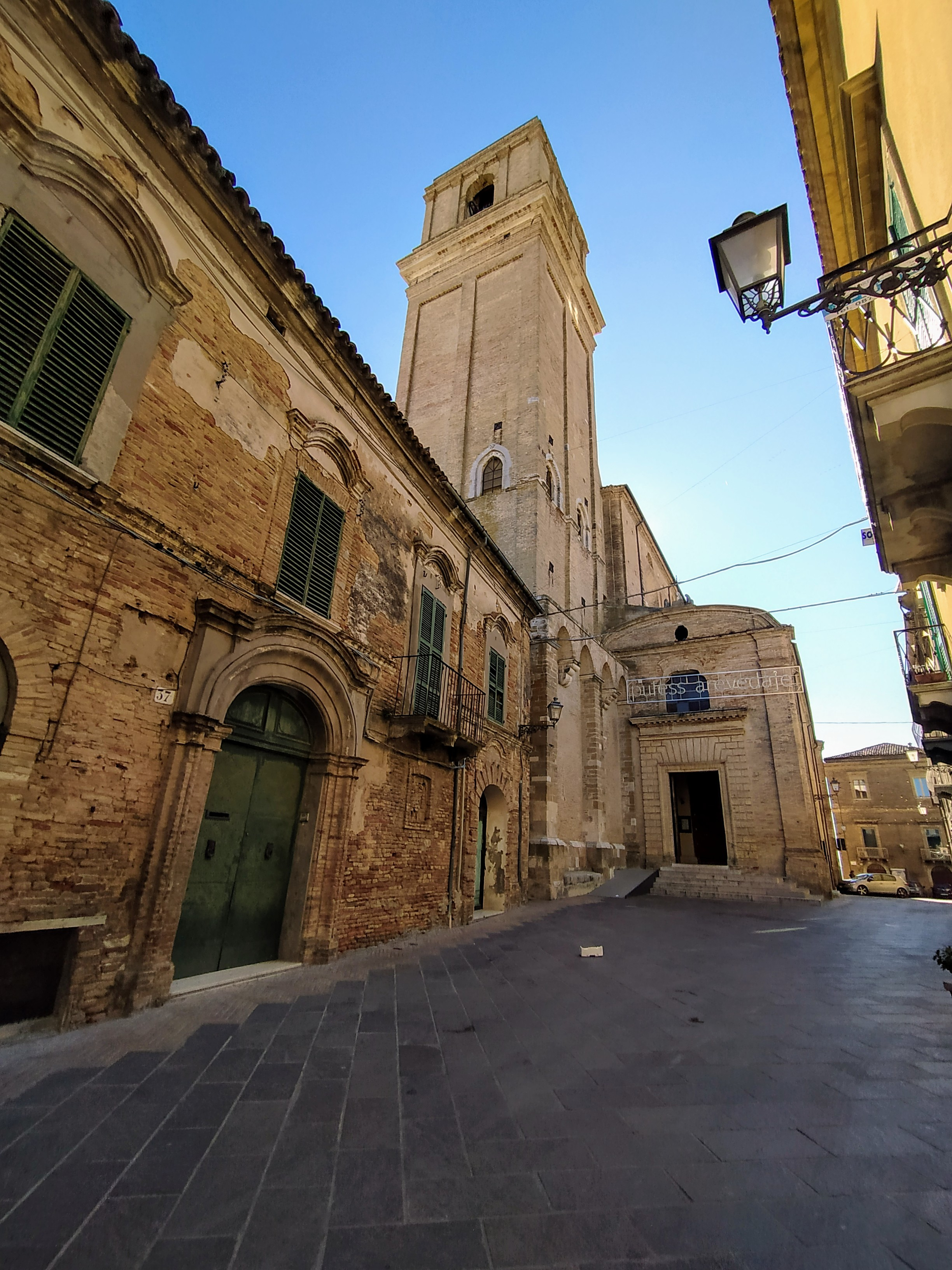
Portal and bell-tower of Santa Maria Maggiore

San Maria Maggiore is a Roman Catholic parish church located on via Santa Maria in the historic district of Vasto, region of Abruzzi, Italy.

== History and description ==
Putatively, the first mention of this church is in a 5th-century letter by Pope Gregory the Great, who speaks of a church dedicated to Sant'Eleuterio, identified with this church and subservient to the diocese of Chieti. However, documentary evidence dates only to 1195 in a document from Henry VI Hohenstaufen, Holy Roman Emperor sent to Odorisio, the abbot of the Benedictine monastery of the San Giovanni in Venere Abbey in Fossacesia, confirming that abbeys possession of the church of Sacte Marie in Guastoaymonis. There was apparently a burst of construction in the 13th and 14th century, including rebuilding a tall bell-tower, which also served as a defensive fortification, in what was an Adriatic town prone to Saracen raids.

The church would suffer a number of environmental and human depredations. On August 1, 1566, the Ottoman admiral Piali Pasha, sacked the town and burned all the churches. Some repairs were performed, but in June 14–15, 1645, the church again burned down. Most of the present structure thus derives from after this date. The belltower was completed in 1730. Much of the decoration was subsidized by the Marquis d’Avalos, lord of Vasto.

In the church are tombs for Nicola Alfonso Viti, Bernardino Carnefresca, Venceslao Mayo, and members of the 'Avalos family: Alfonso and Diego I. The crypt holds in a glass case relics (bones and blood) of the first (or 4th) century Christian martyr, St Cesario, donated by don Cesare Michelangelo d'Avalos. His skeleton holds a silver palm leaf symbolizing his martyrdom. The attributes of a soldier, helmet and sword, are on the floor of the case beside him. Relics comprising more than one person, all putatively attributed to Cesario, are found throughout Europe.

In the Capella della Spina there is putatively a spine from the crown of thorns worn by Christ. This relic was donated by Pope Pius IV (1499 – 1565) to Francesco Ferdinando d’Avalos, a prominent commander and statesman in the employ of the Hapsburgs of Spain. The chapel is at the end of the right nave and was designed in 1890 by Roberto Benedetti. It was refurbished in 1921 and redecorated in 1933. The polychrome marble niche holding the reliquary was commissioned in 1647 by Diego d’Avalos.
