= War of L'Aquila =

1420s battles in Italy

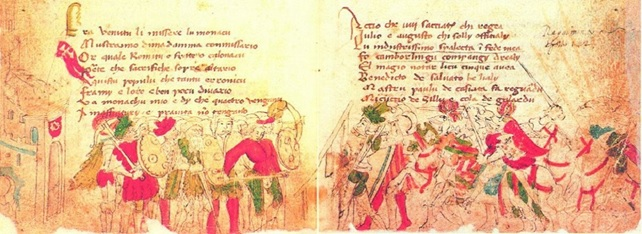
Date	7 May 1423 – 5 June 1424
Location	near L'Aquila, present-day Italy
Result	Braccio da Montone's defeat

Belligerents
Braccio da Montone	L'Aquila; League of Duchy of Milan; Kingdom of Naples; Papal States

Commanders and leaders
Braccio da Montone †	Muzio Attendolo †; Francesco Sforza; Jacopo Caldora

Strength
6,000 infantry 3,200 cavalry	10,000 infantry (5,000 Milanese, 3,000 Papal troops, 2,000 Neapolitans); 3,360 cavalry

The War of L'Aquila (Italian: Guerra dell'Aquila) was a conflict in 15th-century Italy. It started in 1423 as a personal conflict against the condottiero Braccio da Montone and the city of L'Aquila in Abruzzo, but later turned into a national conflict when the forces of the Duchy of Milan, the Republic of Florence, the Papal States, and the Kingdom of Naples were also involved. Braccio da Montone was killed in the final battle near L'Aquila.

== Background ==
In 1423 Braccio da Montone was named by Queen Joanna II of Naples as constable of the Abruzzi for ten years. The condottiero, however, was fighting in Umbria, and named Ruggero d'Antignola as governor with the task to put these lands under his personal rule against the royal power of the Kingdom of Naples.

After an initial period of good relationships, in late 1422 the citizens of L'Aquila, fearing to lose their secular autonomy, rebelled under the leadership of Antonuccio Camponeschi and expelled Ruggero d'Antignola. The Camponeschi family was related with Giacomo Marzano, grand admiral of Naples, and the condottiero Muzio Attendolo, lord of Benevento and Manfredonia, as well as with Pope Martin V, who supported Louis III of Anjou's claims against Joanna. When the city declared itself under Louis' suzerainty, Braccio da Montone mobilized its forces to regain it.

== History ==
In late 1423, Braccio da Montone's strong army started destroying the 99 historical castles (in Italian, Castelli Fondatori, meaning "founding castles") which surrounded the city. In May 1424, the population took refuge in Aquila itself and prepared for the siege. After a failed storming attempt, Braccio da Montone took a position on the Collemaggio hill, waiting for the city to surrender by famine.

In the meantime, a coalition between Florence, Milan, and the Pope mustered an army under the condottieri Jacopo Caldora and Francesco Sforza. The final clash between the two armies occurred in early June 1424. Muzio Attendolo had died in the march towards L'Aquila while wading the Pescara River.

After having been initially pushed back by Caldora, Braccio started losing ground. His vice-commander, Niccolò Piccinino, left the position on the city walls. This left his army's right flank, which was immediately attacked by Francesco Sforza. In the meantime, the Aquilans under Antonuccio Camponeschi sortied from the gates and contributed to Braccio's complete defeat. Mortally wounded in the neck, Braccio was made prisoner and transported to L'Aquila, where he died three days later, on 5 June 1424.

== Sources ==
- Gleijeses, Vittorio (1978). La Storia di Napoli. Naples: Società Editrice Napoletana.
