= Romani (name) =

Romani is used as a surname and a given name. Notable people with the name are as follows:

== People ==
=== Surname ===
- Angelo Romani (1934–2003), Italian swimmer
- Bruno Romani (1960–2025), Italian saxophonist
- Claudia Romani (born 1982), Italian American model
- Darlan Romani (born 1991), Brazilian track and field athlete specialising in the shot put
- Elio Romani (1920–1999), Italian chess master
- Felice Romani (1788–1865), Italian poet, scholar of literature and mythology, and opera librettist
- Francesco Romani (1785–1852), Italian medical doctor
- Girolamo Romani or Romanino (c. 1485 – c. 1566), Italian painter
- Juana Romani (1867–1923), Italian-born French painter
- Paolo Romani (born 1947), Italian politician
- Roger Romani (1934–2025), French politician
- Valentina Romani (born 1996), Italian actress

=== Given name ===
- Romani (adventurer) (fl. 1682–1714), French adventurer
- Romani Hansen (born 1997), American basketball player
- Romani Rose (born 1946), Romany activist

=== Pen name ===
- Shabnam Romani, pen name of Urdu poet Mirza Azeem Baig Chughtai (1928–2009)

== Fictional characters ==
- Romani, one of the major characters in the video game The Legend of Zelda: Majora's Mask
