= Pope Martin V =

Head of the Catholic Church from 1417 to 1431

- Bishop of Rome
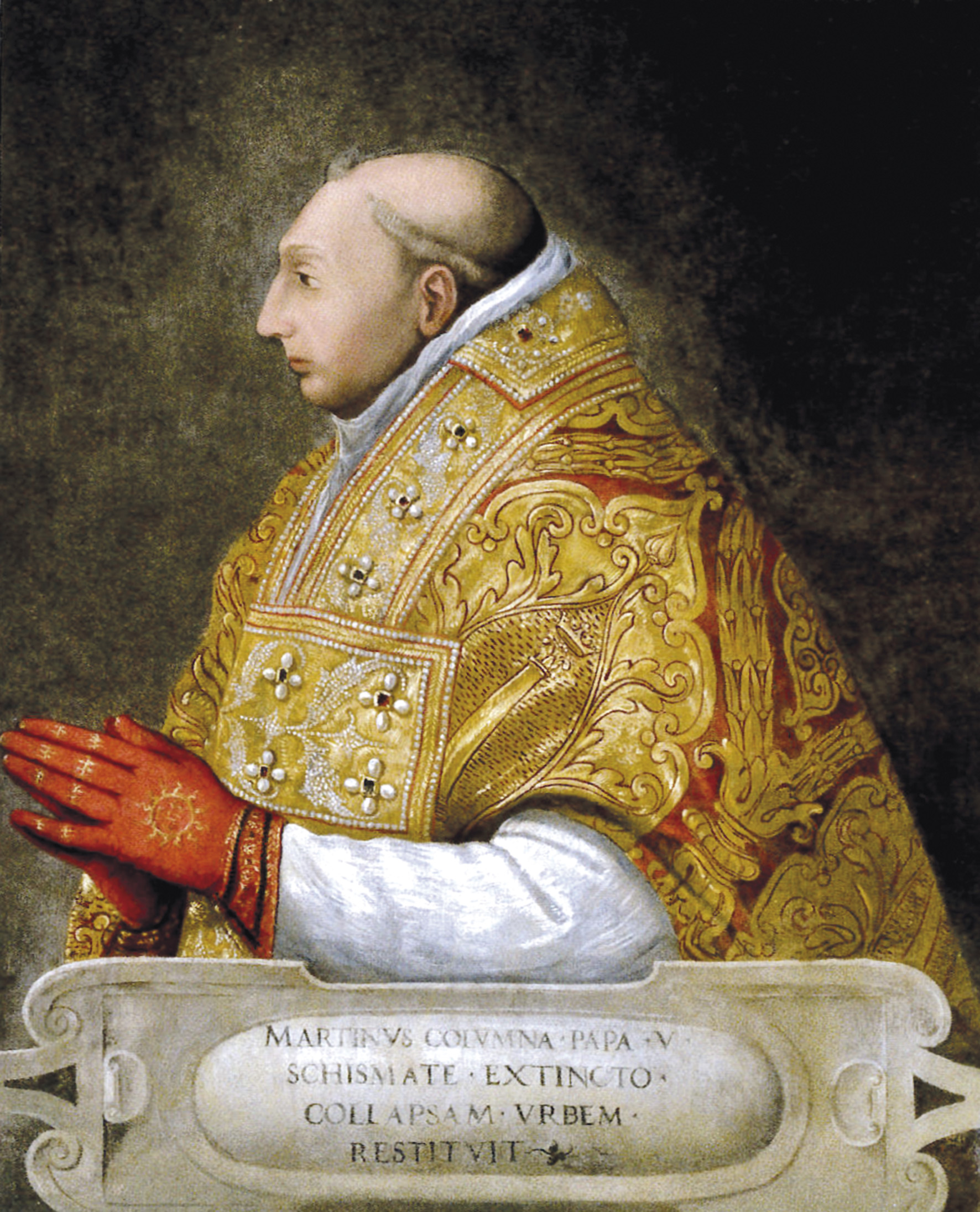
- Portrait of Pope Martin V, 16th century
- Church: Catholic Church
- Elected: 11 November 1417
- Papacy began: 14 November 1417
- Papacy ended: 20 February 1431
- Predecessor: Gregory XII
- Successor: Eugene IV

Orders
- Ordination: 13 November 1417
- Consecration: 14 November 1417 by Jean Franczon Allarmet de Brogny
- Created cardinal: 12 June 1405 by Innocent VII

Personal details
- Born: Oddone Colonna; January/February 1368/1369 Genazzano, Papal States
- Died: 20 February 1431 (aged 63) Rome, Papal States
- Coat of arms: Martin V's coat of arms

Papal styles of Pope Martin V
- Reference style: His Holiness
- Spoken style: Your Holiness
- Religious style: Holy Father
- Posthumous style: None

Pope Martin V (Latin: Martinus V; Italian: Martino V; January/February 1368/1369 – 20 February 1431), born Oddone Colonna, was the head of the Catholic Church and ruler of the Papal States from 11 November 1417 to his death in February 1431. His election effectively ended the Western Schism of 1378–1417. As of 2026, he remains the last pope to have taken the pontifical name "Martin".

== Biography ==
Born between 26 January and 20 February 1368/1369 (Note: His date of birth can be established basing on the following contemporary reports: In a document issued on January 25, 1391 by Pope Boniface IX, Colonna is reported as being in the 22nd year of his life, see Bianca (2008) Dizionario Biografico degli Italiani, op. cit.; "Pope Martin V, Born at Genazzano in the Campagna di Roma, 1368; died at Rome, 20 Feb., 1431.") at Genazzano, Oddone Colonna was the son of Agapito Colonna and Caterina Conti.

Oddone studied law at the University of Pavia; he became apostolic protonotary under Pope Urban VI (1378–1389), and was created Cardinal-Deacon of San Giorgio in Velabro by Pope Innocent VII in 1405.

In 1409 he took part in the Council of Pisa, and was one of the supporters of Antipope Alexander V. Later he confirmed his allegiance to Alexander's successor, John XXIII, by whom his family obtained several privileges, while Oddone obtained for himself the vicariate of Todi, Orvieto, Perugia and Umbria; He was excommunicated for this in 1411 by Pope Gregory XII. Oddone was with John XXIII's entourage at the Council of Constance [Costanza] and followed him in his escape at Schaffhausen [Sciaffusa] on 21 March 1415; later he returned to Constance and took part in the process leading to the deposition of John XXIII.

== Papacy ==
=== Election ===
After deposing Antipope John XXIII in 1415, the Council of Constance (1417) was long divided by the conflicting claims of Pope Gregory XII (1406–15) and Antipope Benedict XIII (1394–1423); eventually Gregory resigned and Benedict was deposed. Oddone was elected pope at the Council on 11 November 1417, taking his pontifical name in honour of Martin of Tours, whose feast fell on the day of his election. Participants in the conclave included 23 cardinals and 30 delegates of the council. He was ordained a priest on 13 November 1417, and consecrated bishop the next day. His election effectively ended the Western Schism of 1378–1417.

Martin left Constance at the close of the council (May 1418), but travelled slowly through Italy and lingered at Florence. His authority in Rome was represented by his brother Giordano, who had fought under Muzio Attendolo against the condottiero Braccio da Montone. The Pope at the time ruled only Rome (when not rebellious) and its environs: Braccio held Umbria, Bologna as an independent commune, while much of Romagna and the Marche was held by local "vicars", who were in fact petty hereditary lords. In particular, Martin confirmed Giorgio Ordelaffi in Forlì, Ludovico Alidosi in Imola, Malatesta IV Malatesta in Rimini, and Guidantonio da Montefeltro in Spoleto, who would later marry the pope's niece Caterina Colonna.

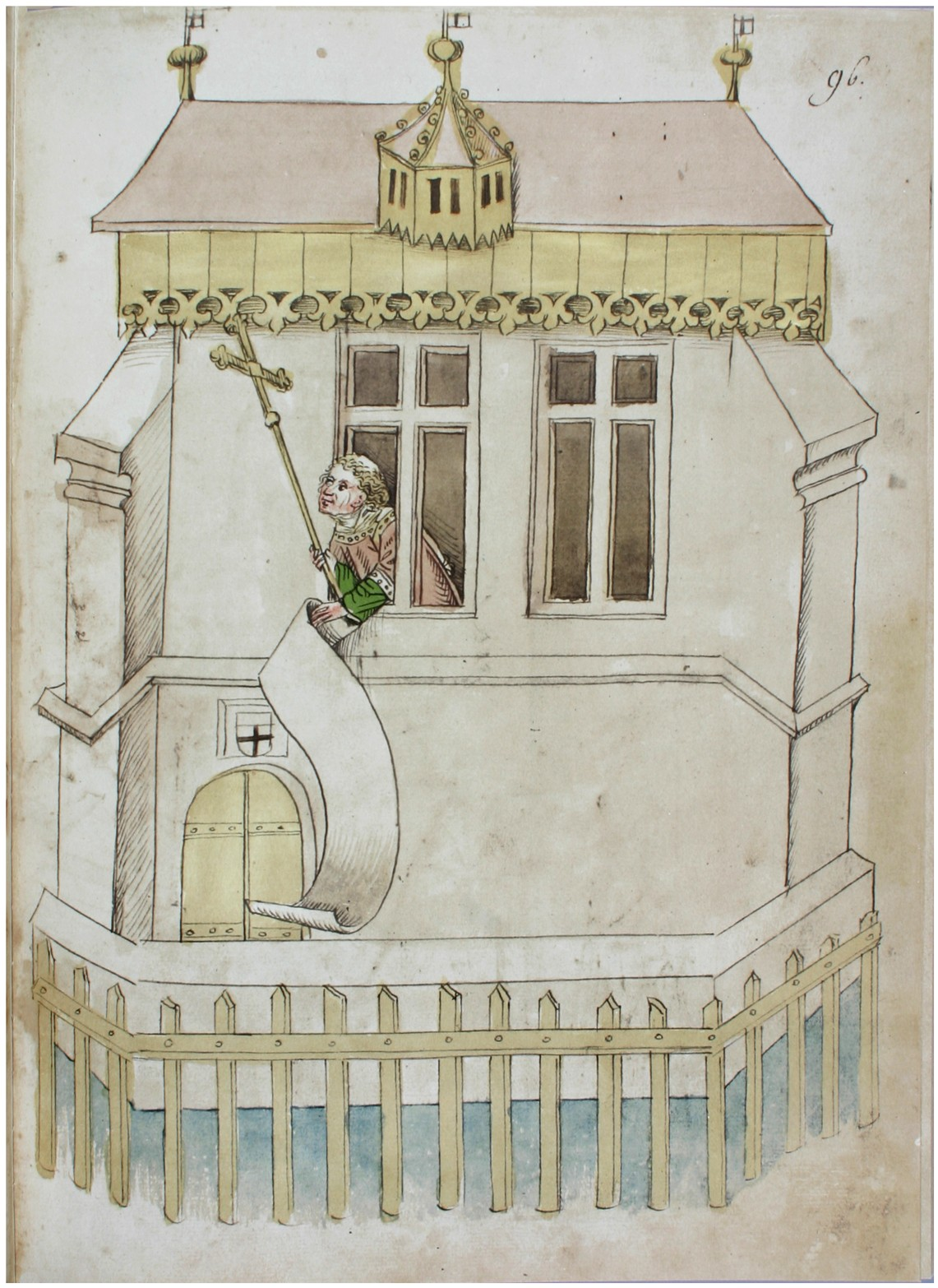
Pope Martin's election is announced. Chronicle of Ulrich of Richenthal.

In exchange for the recognition of Joanna II of Naples, Martin obtained the restitution of Benevento, several fiefs in the Kingdom of Naples for his relatives and, most important of all, an agreement that Muzio Attendolo, then hired by the Neapolitans, should leave Rome.

After a long stay in Florence while these matters were arranged, Martin was able to enter Rome in September 1420. He at once set to work establishing order and restoring the dilapidated churches, palaces, bridges, and other public structures. For this reconstruction he engaged some famous masters of the Tuscan school and helped instigate the Roman Renaissance.

Faced with competing plans for general reform offered by various nations, Martin V submitted a counter-scheme and entered into negotiations for separate concordats, for the most part vague and illusory, with the Holy Roman Empire, England, France and Spain.

=== Hussite Wars ===
By 1415 Bohemia was in turmoil and the subject of much discussion at the Council of Constance. Adherents of Jan Hus, who had been previously burned at the stake as a heretic by the council, adopted the practice of Communion under both kinds. The Council sent letters to the civil and ecclesiastical authorities in Bohemia, insisting they deal with the heresy. Bohemian and Moravian nobles responded that the sentence on Hus was unjust and insulting to their country, and promised to protect priests against episcopal prosecutions for heresy.

In 1419 King Wenceslaus IV, who had resisted what he considered interference in his kingdom, commanded that all ejected Catholic beneficiaries should be reinstated in their offices and revenues. Prague prepared for armed resistance. Jan Želivský, an extreme anti-Catholic preacher of Prague, led a procession to the town hall, where under the leadership of Jan Žižka of Trocnov, a noble of southern Bohemia, the building was stormed and people found inside were thrown out of the windows on to the spears and swords of the processionists, and hacked to pieces. In Kuttenberg, hundreds of captured Hussites were thrown by the miners into the shafts of disused silver mines. King Wenceslaus swore death to all the rebels, but died of a stroke in August, 1419. The next months were marked by deeds of violence; many citizens, especially Germans, had to flee.

Wenceslaus was succeeded by his brother Sigismund, King of the Romans and King of Hungary, who prepared to restore order. On 1 March 1420, Pope Martin V issued a Bull inviting all Christians to unite in a crusade against the Wycliffites (Lollards), Hussites, and other heretics. In 1428, the pope commanded that the remains of Wycliffe, who was posthumously declared a heretic in 1415, be dug up and burned. The crusades against the Lollards, however, were ultimately unsuccessful.

=== Crusades ===
According to Burton, Pope Martin authorized a crusade against Africa in 1418 in relation to the slave trade.

In addition to the Hussite Crusades, Martin declared a Crusade against the Ottoman Empire in 1420 in response to the rising pressure from the Ottoman Turks. In 1419–1420 Martin had diplomatic contacts with the Byzantine emperor Manuel II, who was invoking a council in Constantinople. On 12 July 1420 the Pope conceded to attach an indulgence to anyone who would contribute to a crusade against the latter, which would be led by Sigismund, King of the Romans.

=== War against Braccio da Montone ===
The main concern of Martin's pontificate from 1423 was the resumed war against Braccio da Montone. The following year, the combined Papal-Neapolitan army, led by Giacomo Caldora and Francesco Sforza, defeated him at the Battle of L'Aquila (2 June 1424); Braccio died a few days later.

In the same year Martin obtained a reduction of the autonomy of the commune of Bologna, whose finances would be thenceforth under the authority of a papal treasurer. He also ended the war with Braccio da Montone in exchange for his recognition as vicar and reconciled with the deposed John XXIII, to whom he gave the title of Cardinal of Tusculum.

=== Annuity contracts ===
Canon law prohibited interest upon a loan. To avoid this, annuities were paid, interest in effect but not in name. The dispute as to the legality of annuity contracts was brought before Martin V in 1423. He held that purchased annuities, which were redeemable at the option of the seller, were lawful. When the lawfulness of annuities was established, they were widely used in commerce; it seems that city states used them to raise compulsory loans from their citizens.

=== Periodic ecumenical councils ===
A decree of the Council of Constance (Frequens) ordered that councils should be held every five years. Martin V summoned a council in 1423 that met first at Pavia and later at Siena (the "Council of Siena"). It was rather poorly attended, which gave the Pope a pretext for dissolving it, as soon as it had come to the resolution that "internal church union by reform ought to take precedence over external union". It was prorogued for seven years. The seventeenth council then met as the "Council of Basel" in February 1431 shortly before Martin's death.

=== Founding of the University of Louvain ===
On December 9, 1425, Martin founded the University of Louvain or Universitas Lovaniensis in Leuven (also known as "Louvain" in both English and French), a town in what was then the Duchy of Brabant, and what is modern day Belgium. The founding was a result of a petition by Duke John IV of Brabant, a chapter of St. Peter, and town magistrates from Leuven, who sought to establish a university.

== Death ==
Martin V died in Rome of a stroke on 20 February 1431 at the age of 63. He is buried at St. John Lateran Basilica.

== Personal views ==
=== Position on Jews ===
The excitement of the Church during the Hussite movement rendered the Jews apprehensive, and through Emperor Sigismund, they obtained from Pope Martin V various bulls (1418 and 1422) in which their former privileges were confirmed and in which he exhorted the friars to use moderate language. In the last years of his pontificate, however, he repealed several of his ordinances. A gathering, convoked by the Jews in Forlì, sent a deputation asking Pope Martin V to abolish the oppressive laws promulgated by Antipope Benedict XIII. The deputation succeeded in its mission.

=== Position on slavery ===
During the Middle Ages, slavery had fallen out of usage in Europe, with parts of the Church (eg, in England and France) denouncing enslavement of Christians, or the sale of Christian slaves to non-Christians. However, voyages and discoveries brought other continents, where slavery still existed, into European contact, raising the question of whether slavery of unbelievers and outside of Europe was permitted. According to Burton, Pope Martin V authorized a crusade against Africa in 1418, and this, coupled with a later bull of Pope Eugene IV (1441), sanctioned the Portuguese trade in African slaves. In March 1425, Davis notes that a bull was issued that threatened excommunication for any dealers in Christian slaves and ordered Jews to wear a "badge of infamy" to deter, in part, the buying of Christians. Setton states that in June 1425 Martin anathematized those who sold Christian slaves to Muslims. Maxwell states that traffic in Christian slaves was not banned, instead it was purely sales to non-Christian owners. Davidson argues that the papal bull of excommunication issued to the Genoese merchants of Caffa related to the buying and selling of Christians, but was considered ineffectual, as prior injunctions against the Viennese - including the Laws of Gazaria - made allowances for the sale of both Christian and Muslim slaves. In 1441, ten black African slaves were presented to Martin by Prince Henry the Navigator of Portugal. Other scholarly sources argue that Martin supported colonial expansion. Davidson argues that Martin's injunction against slavery was not a condemnation of slavery itself, but rather driven through fear of "infidel power".

Norman Housley states that "political weakness compelled the Renaissance Papacy to adopt an acquiescent and unchallenging position when approached for requests for privileges in favour of these ventures", and that he viewed it "hard to avoid the conclusion that the pope was agreeing to whatever was asked of him by the king".

== Residences ==
During his permanence in Rome, Martin moved his residence from the Lateran to Santa Maria Maggiore and, from 1424, the Basilica of Santi Apostoli near the Palazzo Colonna. He also frequently sojourned in towns held by his family in the Latium (Tivoli, Vicovaro, Marino, Gallicano and others).

== Numbering ==
When the second Pope to take the name Martin was elected in 1281, there was confusion over how many Popes had taken the name before. It was believed then that there were three, so the new Pope of 1281 became Martin IV. But, in reality, those believed to be Martin II and Martin III were actually named Marinus I and Marinus II, although they are sometimes still referred to as "Martin II" and "Martin III" (Latin: Martinus II). This has advanced the numbering of all subsequent Popes Martin by two. Popes Martin IV–V were actually the second and third popes by that name.

== See also ==
- Cardinals created by Martin V
- List of popes

== Sources ==
- Burton, Keith Augustus (2007). The blessing of Africa. InterVarsity Press. ISBN 978-0-8308-2762-6.
- Chisholm, Hugh, ed. (1911). "Martin V" . Encyclopædia Britannica (11th ed.). Cambridge University Press.
- Davidson, Basil (1961). The African Slave Trade. James Currey Publishers.
- Davis, David Brion (1988). The problem of slavery in Western culture. Oxford University Press. ISBN 978-0-19-505639-6.
- Engberts, Christiaan (2026). Decentering Leuven University: A Transnational History. Leuven University Press. ISBN 9789462705081.
- Jedin, Hubert; Dolan, John Patrick, eds. (1980). History of the Church: From the High Middle Ages to the eve of the Reformation. Burns & Oates.
- Hermans, M. M.; Nelissen, Marc, eds. (2005). Charters of Foundation and Early Documents of the Universities of the Coimbra Group (2nd ed.). Leuven University Press. ISBN 90 5867 474 6.
- Lazzarini, Isabella, ed. (2021). The Later Middle Ages. Oxford University Press. ISBN 9780192529336.
- Mundy, John Hine; Woody, Kennerly M., eds. (1961). The Council of Constance: The Unification of the Church. Translated by Loomis, Louise Ropes. Columbia University Press.
- Ott, M. (1910). "Martin V". Catholic Encyclopedia. Robert Appleton Company.
- Rollo-Koster, Joëlle (2022). The Great Western Schism, 1378–1417: Performing Legitimacy, Performing Unity. Cambridge University Press. ISBN 9781316733837.
- Semmes, Clovis E. (1996). Racism, health, and post-industrialism. Greenwood Publishing Group. ISBN 978-0-275-95428-4.
- Setton, Kenneth M. (1978). The Papacy and the Levant. DIANE Publishing. ISBN 978-0-87169-127-9. Review
- Williams, George L. (2024). Papal Genealogy: The Families and Descendants of the Popes. McFarland, Inc. ISBN 9781476632278.

Catholic Church titles
Preceded by Gregory XII; Benedict XIII (Avignon claiment); John XXIII (Pisan claiment)	Pope; 14 November 1417 – 20 February 1431	Succeeded by Eugene IV
