= Vittorio Coccia =

Italian footballer

Personal information
- Date of birth: 18 May 1918
- Place of birth: Vasto, Italy
- Date of death: 3 November 1982 (aged 64)
- Position: Midfielder

Senior career*
Years	Team	Apps	(Gls)
1936–1937	Chieti		
1937–1940	Vigevano	52	(14)
1940–1941	Ambrosiana-Inter	4	(0)
1941–1942	Pro Patria	5	(1)
1942–1943	Salernitana	30	(20)
1943–1944	Lecce		
1945	Vastese		
1945–1946	Padova	4	(1)
1946–1947	Taranto	21	(2)
1947–1948	Vastese		
1948–1949	Pescara	27	(6)
1949–1950	Vastese		
1950–1951	Marsciano		
1952–1954	Perth Azzurri		
1955	Fremantle Spirit		
- * Club domestic league appearances and goals

Vittorio Coccia (18 May 1918 – 3 November 1982) was an Italian professional football player.
