= Frequens =

Frequens (Frequent) is the name for the decree passed at the Council of Constance on October 9, 1417; it was supposed to ensure that the Pope convened councils regularly. With this decree, the council participants determined that church meetings should be held "forever". The title is the incipit of the decree, the first sentence of which runs, "Frequens generalium conciliorum celebratio agri Dominici praecipua cultura est" ("Frequent celebration of general councils is the best method of cultivating the field of the Lord").

The decree stipulated that a new council must be convoked five years after the Council of Constance, and a second seven years after that. From then on, further councils must take place at least every ten years. In fact, the Council of Pavia followed in 1423 and the Council of Basel began in 1431. The Pope should also announce the date for the next meeting at the end of a council. This continuity was also intended to reinforce the "supremacy" of the decisions of the council over the pope called for in the decree Haec sancta of the Council of Constance, because only regular councils could control the office of the pope. However, only five councils have taken place since the edict was issued.

== See also ==
- Haec sancta
