= Vasto Cathedral =

- Duomo di Vasto
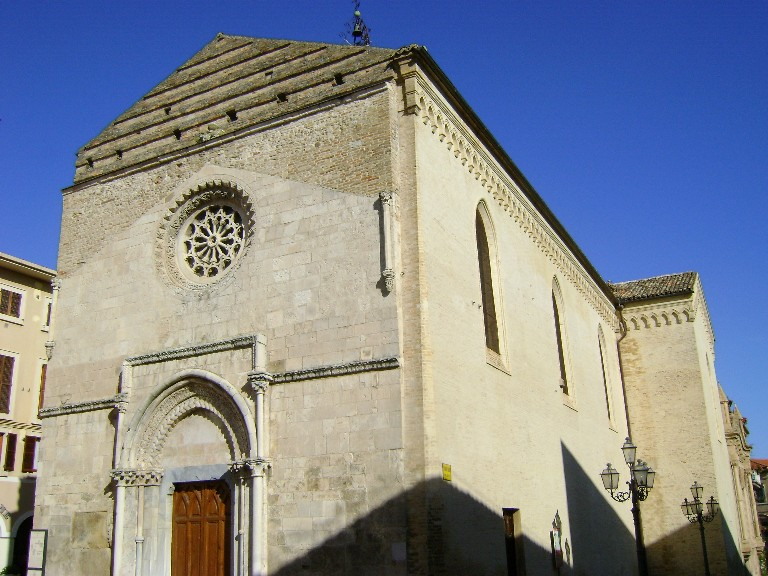
- Vasto Cathedral from Piazza Lucio Valerio Pudente
- Vasto Cathedral
- 42°06′42″N 14°42′33″E
- Location: Vasto, Abruzzo
- Country: Italy
- Denomination: Catholic

History
- Status: Co-cathedral
- Dedication: Saint Joseph
- Dedicated: 1853

Vasto Cathedral (Italian: Duomo di Vasto; Concattedrale di San Giuseppe) is a Roman Catholic cathedral in Vasto, Abruzzo, Italy, dedicated to Saint Joseph. Formerly the episcopal seat of the Diocese of Vasto, it is now a co-cathedral in the Archdiocese of Chieti-Vasto.

== History ==
Vasto Cathedral was built some time during the 13th century as St. Augustine, but it was soon changed to its current name. It was dedicated as a cathedral by then-Pope Pius IX in 1853, but demoted to co-cathedral in 1986.
