= Francesco Romani =

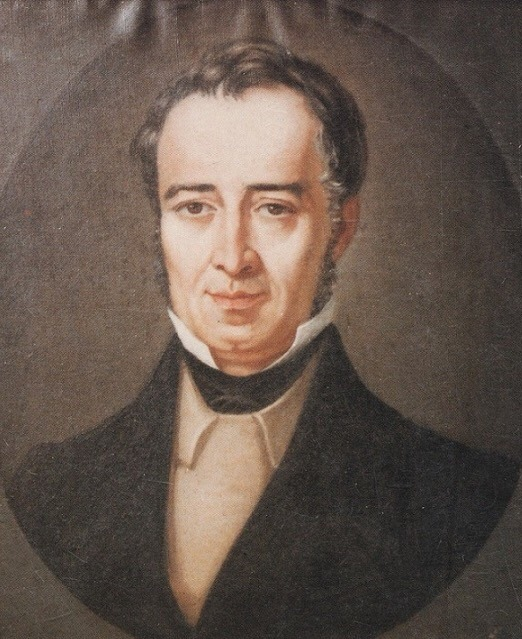
Francesco Romani, musei di palazzo d'Avalos, Vasto (portrait by Cesario Giacomucci)

Francesco Romani (Vasto, 24 September 1785 – Naples, 14 November 1852) was an Italian medical doctor.

== Biography ==
Francesco Romani was born in Vasto in 1785. After his first studies in maths, philosophy and literature in the near Chieti, he came back to his hometown, where he started to teach literature; just a few months later, he suddenly changed his mind and joined the University of Naples ' Faculty of Medicine.

Due to his fame, Queen Maria Amalia of Naples and Sicily appointed him as her court ordinary doctor. With the Austrian troops who occupied the country in 1822, owing to a revolution, Romani had the great possibility to meet the homoeopathic Dr Necker that give him his first notions about the Samuel Hahnemann’s therapy. After some treatments on himself, he devoted himself to the study of this new kind of medicine. In turn, Romani was the first doctor to introduce the new doctrine of Homoeopathy into Italy and spread it abroad through his several writings.

In 1829, Dr Romani and Cosmo Maria De Horatiis conducted a new homoeopathic experiment in the big hospital of Trinity in Naples; for 155 days, with the king Francesco I's agreement, they opened a clinic where the patients were nursed not with normal cures but just with homoeopathic ones. Although this new hospital didn’t succeed, they made known that new knowledge.

Romani visited England in the autumn of 1830, where he became, for 4 years, the personal homoeopathic doctor of the Earl of Shrewsbury. In this short period of residence, he was the first one to introduce the new kind of medicine in all England. He made several homoeopathic publications during his life, and he edited, in 1825, a translation into Italian of Hahnemann’s Materia Medica.

Francesco Romani died in Naples on 14 November 1852.

== Principal writings ==
- Ricordi sulla peste redatti in un sistema teorico-pratico, Naples 1816, pp.204.
- Sunto sulle annotazioni pratiche sulle malattie degli occhi raccolte ed illustrate da G.B. Quadri, May–September 1819.
- Discorsi sull’Omiopatia, Naples 1835.
- Sui preservativi omeopatici del colera Indiano e sulla disinfettazione degli edifici e dei mobili contagiati, Naples 1836, pp. 48.
- Cenno biografico del Conte Sebastiano De Guidi. Introduzione dell’Omiopatia in Francia", Poliorama, Naples 1837.
- Elogio storico di Samuello Anemanno, Naples 1845, pp. 279.

== Bibliography ==
- Alberto Lodispoto, Storia della Omeopatia in Italia. Storia antica di una terapia moderna, Edizioni Mediterranee, Rome 1987.
- Francesco Romani, Elogio Storico di Samuello Anemanno, Kessinger Publishing, 1845.
- Giuseppe Pietrocola, I Quaderni del Club "Amici di Vasto", Litografia Centro Stampa, Vasto 1997, n.13
