= Jacopo Caldora =

Italian condottiero

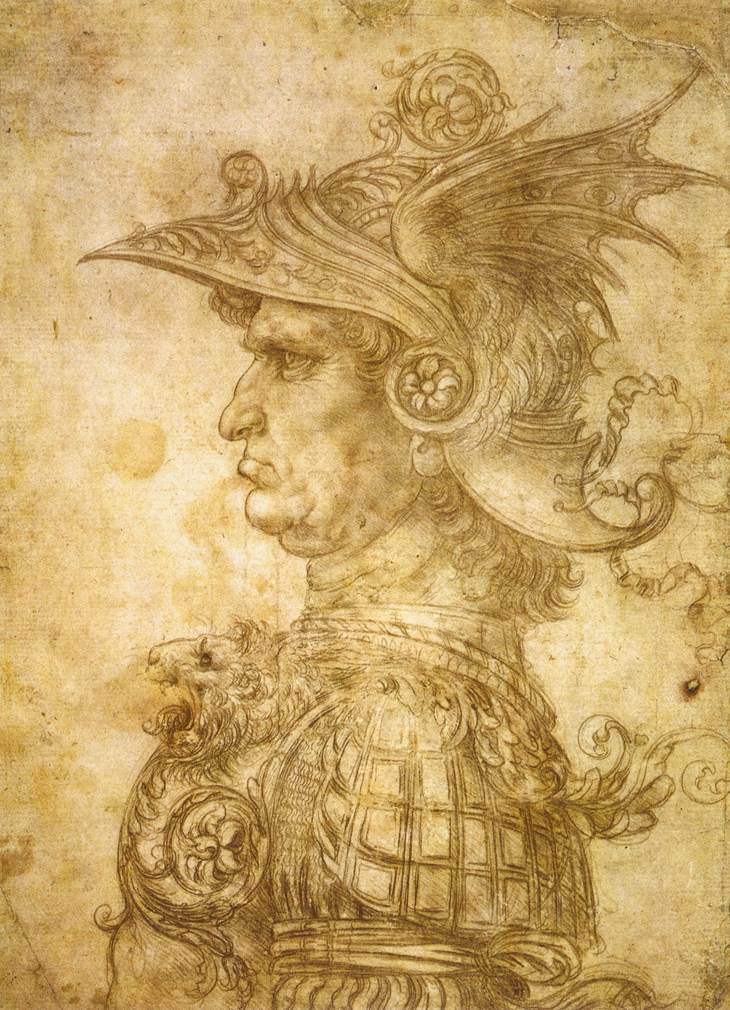

Duke of Bari
- Reign: 11 October 1432 – 15 November 1439
- Predecessor: Raimondo Orsini del Balzo
- Successor: Antonio Caldora
- Born: Castel del Giudice, Kingdom of Naples
- Died: 15 November 1439 (aged 69–70); Colle Sannita, Kingdom of Naples
- Buried: Badia Morronese, Sulmona
- Noble family: Caldora
- Spouses: Medea d'Evoli; Jacovella da Celano
- Issue: Antonio Caldora; Berlingiero Caldora; Maria Caldora
- Father: Giovanni Antonio Caldora
- Mother: Rita Cantelmo

Jacopo Caldora or Giacomo Caldora (1369 – 15 November 1439) was an Italian condottiero, renowned for his military prowess and political savvy during the turbulent conflicts of early 15th-century Italy. He served as the Grand Constable of the Kingdom of Naples and held various governorships, including that of L'Aquila from June to December 1415. For his achievements in both warfare and statecraft, he was compared by contemporaries to Pompey the Great.

== Biography ==
Coat of arms of the House of Caldora

Jacopo Caldora was born in Castel del Giudice (Abruzzo in present-day Molise, then part of the Kingdom of Naples), into a feudatory family. He began his military career under Braccio da Montone, and, returned to his lands, expanded them by hiring mercenaries from the surrounding mountains. Called to the Neapolitan court by Queen Joan II of Anjou, he became a favourite of the powerful minister Sergianni Caracciolo.

He was the Feudal Lord of Anversa, Arce, Bari, Campo di Giove, Monteodorisio, Pacentro, Palena, Trivento, Valva and Vasto.

Jacopo was the son of Giovanni Antonio Caldora, and Rita Cantelmo, a noblewoman of the powerful Cantelmo Family of French origin. He had two brothers, Restaino and Raimondo.

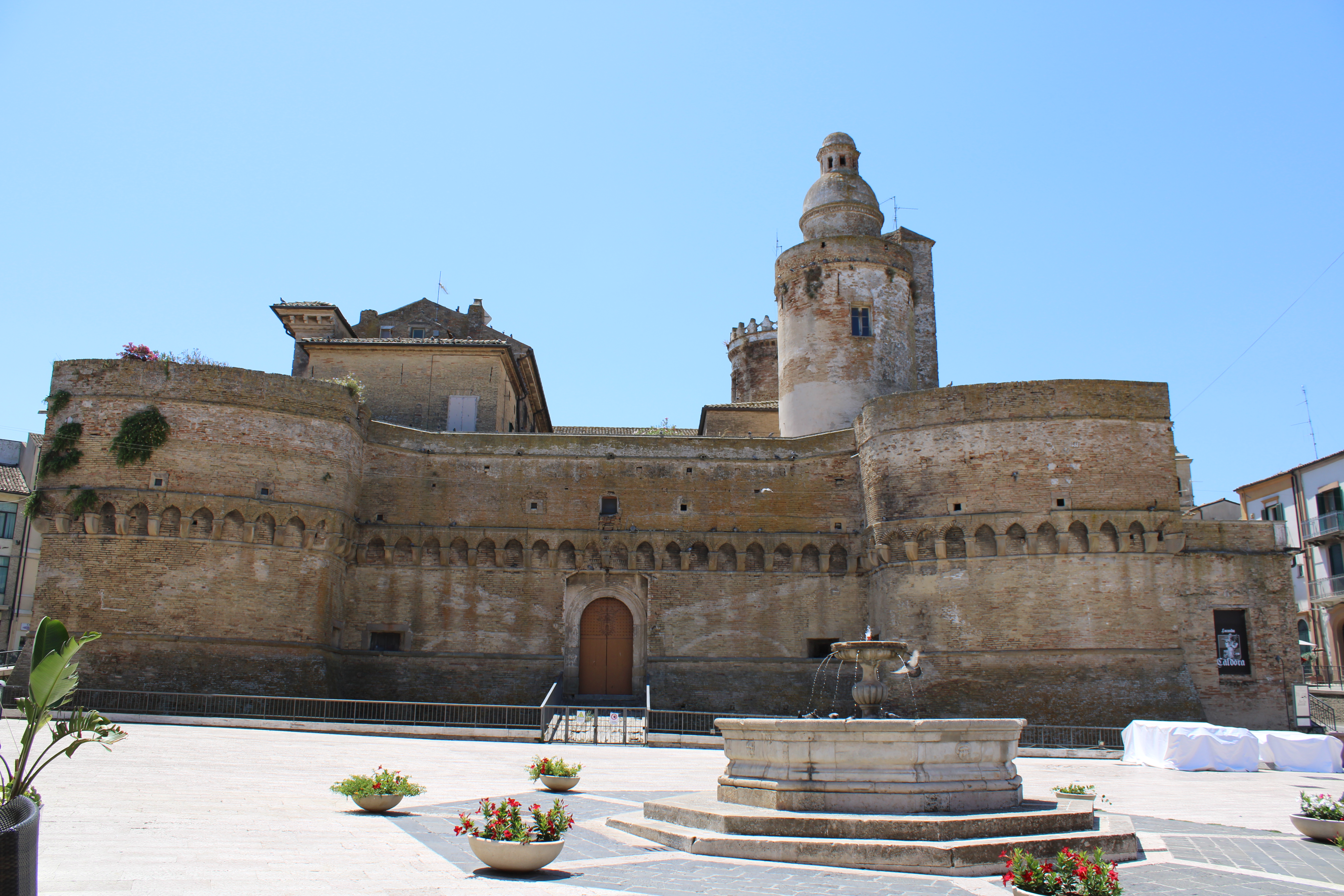
Castello Caldoresco in Vasto

In the political turmoil of the period, Caldora later became a general of Alfonso V of Aragon in his conquest of the Kingdom. When the Aragonese troops were left under siege in Naples, he changed sides again, winning the title of gran connestabile from Queen Joan, and serving as assistant to the Kingdom's commander-in-chief Muzio Attendolo Sforza. When the latter drowned before the Battle of L'Aquila in 1424, Caldora led the Angevine army to victory.

He subsequently continued to defend the Anjou cause after Alfonso's return. In 1431 he was sent to fight against the excommunicated Colonna in southern Lazio, but he was bribed by them and remained inactive. When his protector Sergianni Caracciolo died, and the marriage of his daughter Maria to Francesco Sforza was annulled by Pope Martin V, he returned to his lands.

He died during a siege at Colle Sannita, near Benevento. He was buried by his family in a chapel of the Abbey of the Holy Spirit (also known as Badia Morronese), near Sulmona. This chapel and an elaborate sarcophagus was built by his mother for the family in 1412.

His son Antonio Caldora was also a successful condottiero who later sided with the Anjou faction against Ferdinand of Aragon. This led to his defeat and the end of the Caldora dynasty at the Siege of Vasto in 1464.

== Sources ==
- Rendina, Claudio (1994). I capitani di ventura. Rome: Newton Compton.
