= Alfonso Félix de Ávalos Aquino y Gonzaga, Marquess del Vasto =

Alfonso Félix de Ávalos Aquino y Gonzaga, 8th Marquess of Pescara, 4th Marquess of Vasto (1564 – 2 December 1593), was an Italian noble in the service of the King of Spain.

== Early life ==
Alfonso Félix was born in Ischia in 1564 into the noble Ávalos, d'Aquino and Gonzaga families. He was the eldest son of Francesco Ferdinando d'Ávalos (c. 1530–1571), the Governor of the Duchy of Milan and Viceroy of Sicily, and Isabella Gonzaga. His younger brother was Tomás Dávalos de Aragón, Count of Castelluccio, who was Latin Patriarch of Antioch between 1611 and 1622.

His paternal grandparents were Alfonso d'Avalos, 6th Marquess of Pescara and 2nd of Vasto, also a Governor of the Duchy of Milan, and Maria d'Aragona (a daughter of Duke Ferdinando di Montalto, a son of King Ferdinand I of Naples). His paternal uncle was Cardinal Innico d'Avalos d'Aragona. His maternal grandparents were Federico II Gonzaga, Duke of Mantua and Margaret Paleologina, Marchioness of Montferrat (daughter, and eventual heir, of William IX of Montferrat and Anne of Alençon). His maternal uncles included Francesco III Gonzaga, Duke of Mantua, Guglielmo Gonzaga, Duke of Mantua (who married Archduchess Eleanor of Austria), Louis Gonzaga, Duke of Nevers (who married Henriette of Cleves), and Cardinal Federico Gonzaga.

== Career ==
On his father's death in 1571, the young Alfonso Félix succeeded as 3rd Prince of Francavilla, 3rd Prince of Montesarchio, 4th Marquess of Vasto, 8th Marquess of Pescara, and Count of Monteodorisio, and a Grandee of Spain.

He was appointed as Cavalry officer under the orders of Alexander Farnese, Duke of Parma for Spain during the Dutch Revolt (part of the Eighty Years' War). In 1584, he received the order to leave for Flanders, while his pregnant wife returned to Pesaro. Between July and August 1585 Alfonso Félix took part in the Siege of Antwerp.

After returning home briefly, he went back to Flanders at the end of April 1586 where he fought, and won, the Battle of Zutphen in September 1586. At the end of November 1586, he was promoted by Alessandro Farnese, on the orders of King Philip II, in light of his success in Flanders, with the position of General of the Light Cavalry of Flanders, also receiving the collar of the Order of the Golden Fleece. While preparing for the Army's expedition against the Kingdom of England, the position of General of Cavalry became vacant (due to the death of the previous holder, Robert de Melun, Viscount of Gent and Marquess of Roubaix). Alfonso Félix and Walloon Emmanuel de Lalaing, Marquess of Renty were the two candidates, however, Alfonso Félix was selected for political reasons and he accepted, providing his consent to the Sovereign's adviser Juan de Idiáquez y Olazábal.

Alfonso Félix, quite ill, returned to Italy in 1589. In 1592, the Duke of Parma went to the baths of Spa, hoping to obtain help for his ailments, together with a retinue that included among others, Alfonso Félix, the Prince of Ascoli, and Don Rodrigo Niño Laso de la Vega. Alfonso Félix's health conditions worsened over the course of the year with recurrent bouts of dizziness and paralysis. Also in 1592, he was involved as a witness, in a matter of honor between his first cousin, the Duke of Mantua, and the Duke of Parma. The matter required the intervention of the Pope and the King of Spain, who commissioned Alfonso Félix's brother-in-law, the Duke of Urbino, to act as peacemaker. Alfonso Félix's wife Lavinia herself intervened personally in settling the dispute.

In 1593, Alfonso Félix was appointed General of the Cavalry of the Duchy of Milan, replacing Don Alonso Martínez de Leiva, along with Lieutenant Alonso de Guzmán y Sotomayor, 7th Duke of Medina Sidonia. However, due to his health problems, he left the Army to go the thermal baths at Procida and Ischia. In November 1593, he traveled to Rome to support the appointment to Cardinalate of his brother Tomás where he died of a stroke on 2 December 1593.

== Personal life ==
In 1583 in Pesaro, the nineteen year old Alfonso Félix married Lavinia Feltria Della Rovere (1558–1632), daughter of Guidobaldo II della Rovere, Duke of Urbino and Vittoria Farnese (a granddaughter of Pope Paul III). At the time of their marriage, they resided at Casalmaggiore (a possession of the d'Avalos family since 1568). Together, they had one son and three daughters, including:

- Isabella d'Avalos d'Aquino d'Aragona (1585–1648), who married her father's cousin, Innico III d'Avalos d'Aquino d'Aragona (1578–1632), a son of Cesare d'Avalos, 1st Marquess of Padula (a younger son of Alfonso d'Avalos) and Lucrezia del Tufo.
- Caterina d'Avalos d'Aquino d'Aragona (1586–1618), who married Camillo II Gonzaga, 5th Count of Novellara, a son of Alfonso Gonzaga, 3rd Count of Novellara and Vittoria di Capua.
- Ferrante Francesco d'Avalos d'Aquino d'Aragona (1587–1590), whose godfather was King Philip II (represented by the Duke of Terranova, Don Carlo d'Aragona Tagliavia); he died young.
- Maria d'Avalos d'Aquino d'Aragona (1589–1632)

Alfonso Félix died in Rome on 2 December 1593. He was succeeded by his eldest daughter Isabella, who became the Marchioness of Pescara.

=== Descendants ===
Through his daughter Isabella, he was posthumously a grandfather of Alfonso d'Avalos d'Aquino d'Aragona (1600–1665), who assumed the titles of Marquess of Pescara and Marquess of Vasto in 1614, (Note: Alfonso d'Avalos d'Aquino d'Aragona (1600–1665) married Geronima Doria, of the Princes of Melfi. Upon his death in 1665, as he had no children, his fiefdoms passed to his younger brother Diego d'Avalos, Prince of Isernia.) Francesca d'Avalos d'Aquino d'Aragona (1602–1676), (Note: Francesca d'Avalos d'Aquino d'Aragona (1602–1676) was the wife of Marino II Caracciolo, 3rd Camillo Caracciolo, Prince of Avellino. After his death in 1630, she married Pompeo II Colonna, 3rd Prince of Gallicano.) Ferdinando Francesco d'Avalos d'Aquino d'Aragona (d. 1648), and Diego d'Avalos d'Aquino d'Aragona, 1st Prince of Isernia (d. 1697). (Note: Diego d'Avalos d'Aquino d'Aragona (d. 1697), was created Prince of Isernia in 1644; he also became the 11th Marquess of Pescara, 7th Marquess of Vasto; he married Francesca Giulia Maria Carafa (1624–1692), a daughter of Girolamo II Carafa, 2nd Prince of Roccella, and Diana Vettori.)

Through his daughter Caterina, he was posthumously a grandfather of Lavinia Gonzaga (1607–1639), (Note: Lavinia Gonzaga (1607–1639) married, as his third wife, Count Wratislaw von Fürstenberg (1584–1631) in 1628, and, after his death in 1631, she married Count Otto Friedrich von Harrach.) Alessandro II Gonzaga (1611–1644), (Note: Alessandro II Gonzaga (1611–1644) was engaged to Anna Bevilacqua, daughter of Ernesto Bevilacqua, 1st Marquess of Bismantova (eldest son of Ercole Bevilacqua and Bradamante d'Este), and Duchess Felice Sassatelli (who later married Torquato Conti, Duke of Guadagnolo), but Anna died in 1630 before they were married.) and Alfonso II Gonzaga, Count of Novellara (1616–1678). (Note: Alfonso II Gonzaga (1616–1678) married Princess Ricciarda Cybo Malaspina of Massa, a daughter of Carlo I Cybo-Malaspina, Prince of Massa and Marquis of Carrara, and Brigida Spinola.)

== Links ==
- Geneall
- Our Royal, Titled, Noble, and Commoner Ancestors & Cousins
- Lavinia Feltria della Rovere e Felice Alfonso d'Avalos, un matrimonio stroncato
