= Eleonora Katharina von Fürstenberg =

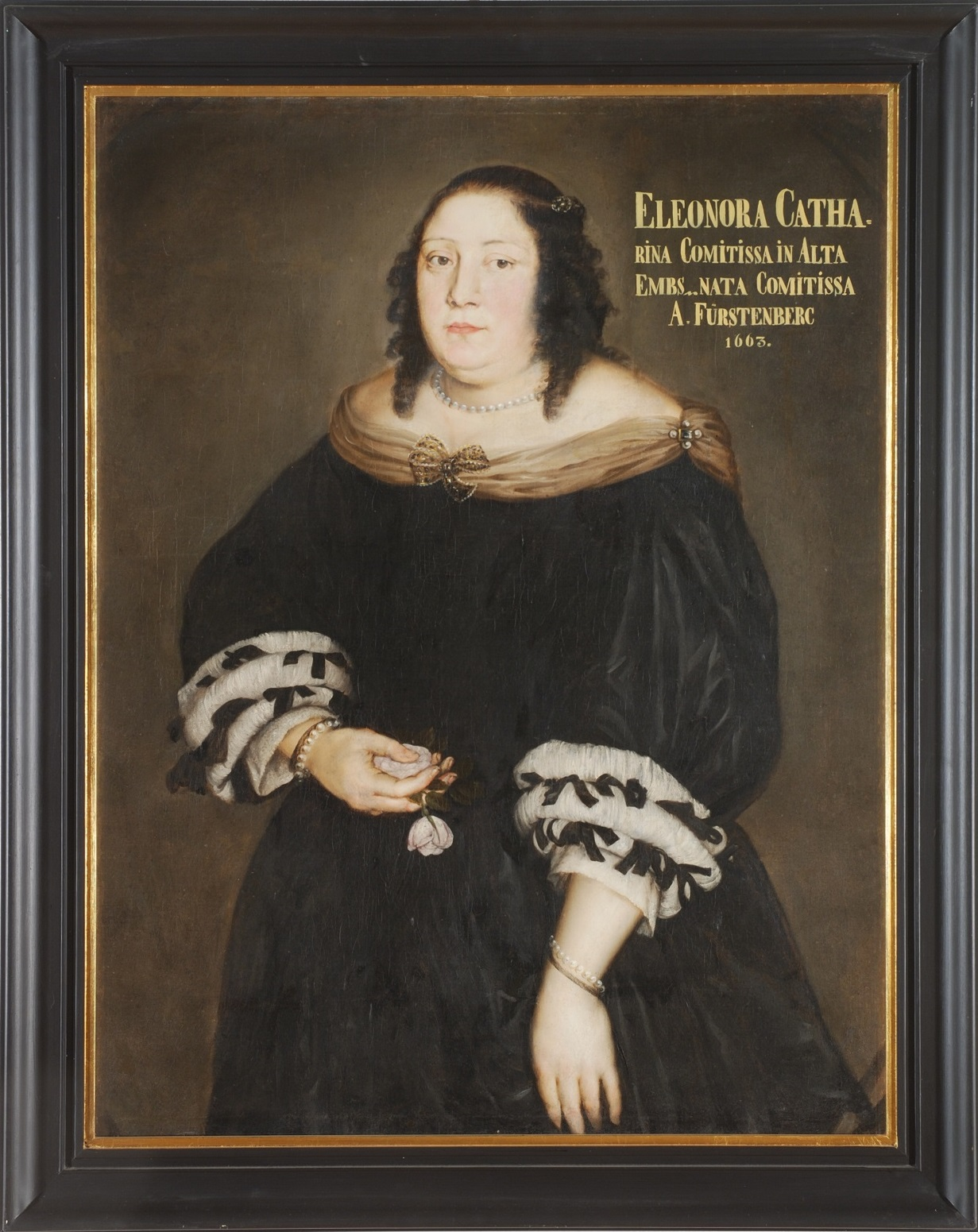
- Died: 18 February 1670
- Spouse(s): Franz Wilhelm I von Hohenems
- Children: Ferdinand Karl von Hohenems, Jakob Hannibal III von Hohenems, Franz Wilhelm Graf von Hohenems
- Parent(s): Wratislaw von Fürstenberg; Lavinia Maria Tecla Gonzaga, Contessa di Novellara

Countess Eleonora Katharina von Fürstenberg (c. 1630 – 18 February 1670) was an aristocrat from the southern German noble family of Fürstenberg. She was the wife of Count Franz Wilhelm I von Hohenems. Together with her brother-in-law, she was sovereign of the County of Vaduz and the Lordship of Schellenberg from 1662 to 1670.

== Early life ==
Landgravine Eleonora Katharina was born in c. 1630, likely in Vienna. She was a daughter of Wratislaw von Fürstenberg, 1st Count of Fürstenberg-Möhringen, who was the President of the Imperial Court Council, and his third wife, Lavinia Gonzaga, Countess of Novellara and Bagniolo. She had two brothers, Albrecht II von Fürstenberg, who died during the Siege of Hohentwiel in 1640, and Franz Wratislaw von Fürstenberg, who died young.

Her paternal grandparents were Count Albrecht I von Fürstenberg and Baroness Elisabeth von Pernštejn. Her maternal grandparents were Countess Caterina d'Avalos (a daughter of Alfonso Félix de Ávalos Aquino y Gonzaga, Marquess del Vasto), and Camillo II Gonzaga, 5th Count of Novellara.

== Career ==
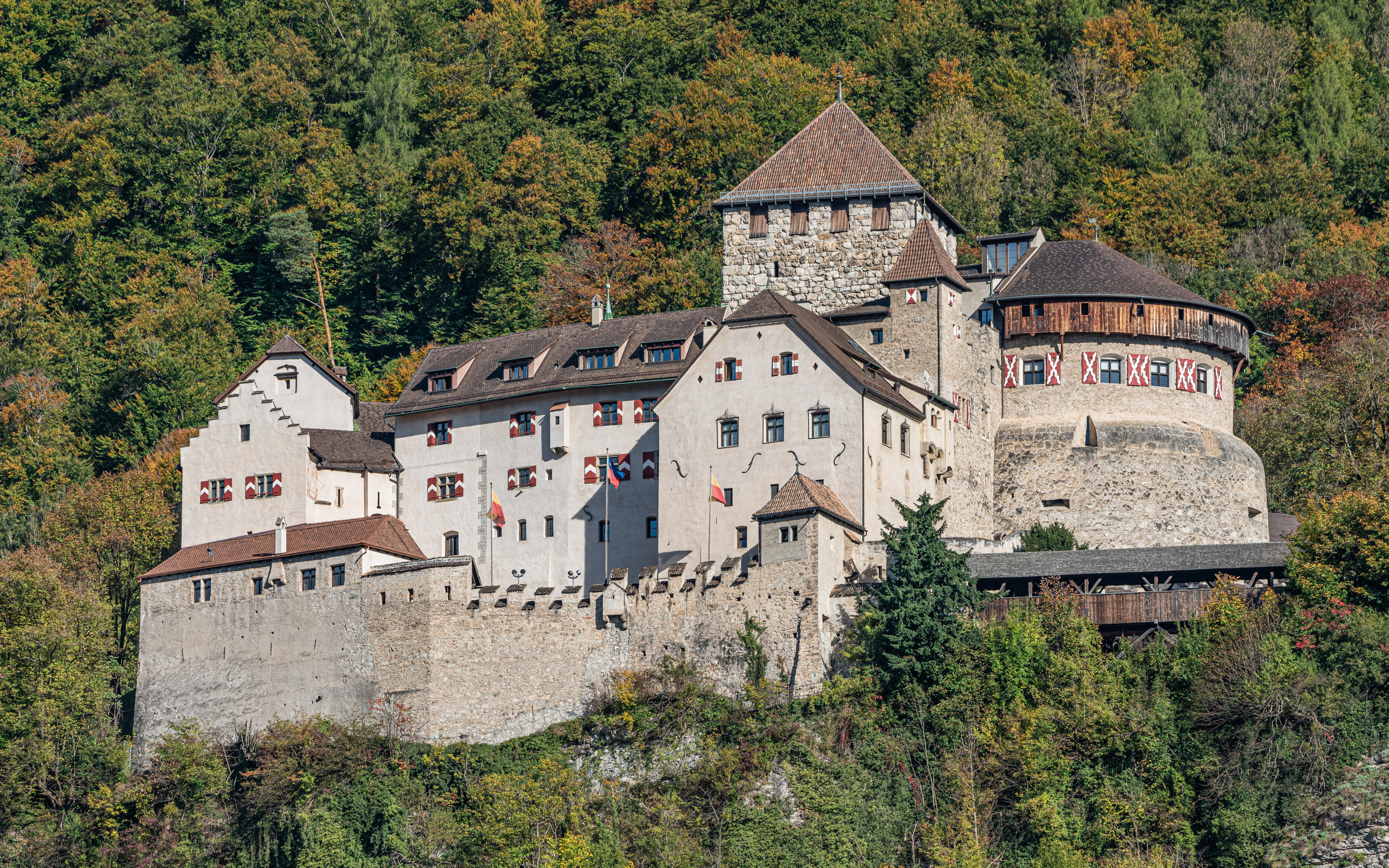
Vaduz Castle

Following the early death of her husband at the age of 35, she was appointed by Emperor Leopold I in 1662, together with her husband's older brother, Karl Friedrich von Hohenems, as guardians of her underage children. In this capacity, she ruled the County of Vaduz and the Lordship (Seigneury) of Schellenberg from 1662 until her death in 1670, (Note: Her husband's grandfather, Count Kaspar von Hohenems (1613–1640), had acquired the County of Vaduz and the Lordship of Schellenberg from Karl Ludwig zu Sulz in 1613.) together with her brother-in-law, in place of her eldest son, Ferdinand Karl, who was only 12 years old at the time. These territories form the present-day Principality of Liechtenstein.

== Personal life ==
On 14 February 1649 in Stühlingen, she married Count Franz Wilhelm I von Hohenems (1628–1662), of the noble Hohenems family. His paternal grandfather was Count Kaspar von Hohenems. The marriage produced five children between 1650 and 1654:

- Maria Franziska von Hohenems (1650–1705), who married Johann Ferdinand Franz Leopold von Enckevoirt.
- Ferdinand Karl von Hohenems (1650–1686), who conducted witch trials between 1678 and 1680, which led to his arrest in 1684; (Note: In 1684, for his undue appropriation and excessive witch-hunts, Emperor Leopold I deprived Ferdinand of his dominions (County of Vaduz and the Lordship of Schellenberg) and appointed Prince Abbot Rupert von Bodman to oversee them.) he died a prisoner at Kemnat Castle (Burgruine Kemnat) near Kaufbeuren.
- Maria Anna von Hohenems (1652–1715)
- Jakob Hannibal III von Hohenems (1653–1730), who was forced to sell the seigneury of Schellenberg for 115,000 guilders in 1699, and the County of Vaduz for 290,000 guilders in 1712, (Note: In return, Jakob Hannibal III bought the County of Bistrau in Bohemia from Hans-Adam I, Prince of Liechtenstein in 1710 for 234,000 guilders.) both to Hans-Adam I, Prince of Liechtenstein, (Note: With these territories, in 1719 Hans-Adam I, Prince of Liechtenstein gained from the Holy Roman Emperor Charles VI the right to found a single state, the present Principality of Liechtenstein.) to cover the debts of his elder brother Ferdinand; he married Baroness Anna Amalia von Schauenstein.
- Franz Wilhelm II von Hohenems (1654–1691), who married Princess Aloisia Josepha of Liechtenstein, a daughter of Maximilian II, Prince of Liechtenstein, and niece of Hans-Adam I, Prince of Liechtenstein, in 1691; he died in Peterwardein from wounds sustained in the Battle of Slankamen (part of the Great Turkish War).

For the couple's belated wedding celebration at Vaduz Castle, a state bed bearing the Coats of arms of Hohenems and Fürstenberg was made, which is now housed in the Vorarlberg State Museum. Together with her husband, Eleonora Katharina donated an altar for the Chapel of St. Mary in Triesen in 1656.

Count Franz Wilhelm died on 19 September 1662 at Chur, Switzerland in the Grisonian Rhine Valley. Countess Eleonora Katharina died of dropsy on 18 February 1670, at the age of about 40, in her widow's residence in Vaduz. On 21 February 1670, her body was transferred to Hohenems and buried in the Count's crypt in the Hohenems parish church. In March 1670, a notary recorded an inventory of her estate in her widow's residence in Vaduz, which provides insight into the Countess's personality and lifestyle in Vaduz. One of three surviving full-length portraits of the Countess, created in 1663 by an unknown artist, is located in the municipal museum of the Czech town of Polička.

=== Descendants ===
Through her son Jakob Hannibal III, she was a grandmother of Franz Rudolph von Hohenems (1686–1756), an Imperial Austrian Field Marshal and General of the Cavalry of the Imperial Army, who married Marchioness Lydia de Hautefort de Surville, Baroness Anna Margaretha von Thurn-Valsassina, and Francisca Romana de la Rochee.

Through her son Franz Wilhelm II, she was a grandmother of Franz Wilhelm III von Hohenems (1692–1759), who married Countess Walburga of Wagensperg (1720–1768).
