= Carlo d'Avalos =

16th-century Italian condottiero

Carlo d'Ávalos
- Born: 1541; Kingdom of Naples
- Died: December 8, 1614 (aged 72–73); Kingdom of Naples
- Military career
- Allegiance: Kingdom of Naples; Spanish Empire
- Branch: Navy; Army
- Service years: 1570-1592
- Rank: Captain
- Awards: Order of Alcántara

Carlo d'Ávalos (1541 – December 8, 1614), Prince of Montesarchio, was a Neapolitan nobleman and military officer in the service of the Hispanic Monarchy.

== Biography ==
He was the seventh child of Alfonso d'Avalos and Maria d'Aragona. He was born in Milan, where his father was at the court of Charles V, and the emperor himself was his godfather at his baptism, bestowing upon him the Order of Alcántara at that time. At the age of thirty, he was commissioned by the parliament of Sicily, of which his brother Francisco was Viceroy at the time, to lead a delegation to the new King Philip II.

In 1571, he and his other brother Cesare participated in the Holy League against the Ottoman Empire. Carlo was given command of the League's squadron of galleons, twenty-four from Spain and two from Venice, which would lend their artillery and tonnage to the Christian vanguard. However, Carlo encountered unfavorable winds and did not arrive until after the Battle of Lepanto had ended. He then participated again under John of Austria in the landing at Corone after the skirmish at Cerigo Channel, and was also present at the siege of Navarino and the conquest of Tunis in 1573. Don John sent him to Spain to seek reinforcements when Occhiali besieged Tunis again, but they were not granted and the city fell.

From 1575 he served in Sicily commanding squads light cavalry, and in 1592 he fought in Piedmont as part of the French Wars of Religion. Four years later, now appointed Grand Chamberlain of Naples, he acquired the fiefdom of Montesarchio. Towards the end of his career, he was the subject of several poems by his friend Torquato Tasso. He died in 1612.

== Issue ==
He married Sveva Gesualdo and had three children, Alonso Francesco, Ferdinando and Maria.
