= House of Guardato =

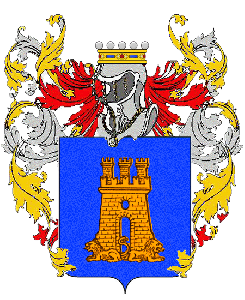
Medieval Arms of the Guardato Family

Guardato was an Aristocratic Patrician family, sometimes spelled Guardati and includes cadet branches of Guardi, Guardia, and Della Guardia which have relations to the ancient merchants of Genoa, the Rossetti family.

== History ==
The nobility of the Guardato family hearkens back to antiquity, to the merchant city of Sorrento, during the medieval reign of the feudal Normans. Established as predominant merchants, they acquired great wealth and political control coinciding with the rule of King William the Good. Through ambitious foreign policy of the Kingdom of Sicily, the military conquests of the Kingdom of Castile, and eventually the Crusades, the Guardato family has distinguished itself ever more to military valor with members inducted into the Knights Hospitaller, Knights of Alcántara, and the Knights of Calatrava, and served in high and important governmental offices and other noble prerogatives. The Guardato family has enjoyed Patrician nobility in Sorrento in the Seat of Door, and in Salerno, the Seat of Field; and having enjoyed Patrician status of Sorrento unto its abolition in 1804, thus the Guardatos ascribed to closed the Kingdom.

== Notable members ==
- Francesco Guardi
- Gian Antonio Guardi
- Domenico Guardi
- Niccolò Guardi
- Maria Cecilia Guardi
- Diana Guardato Mother of Ferdinando d' Aragona y Guardato, 1st Duke of Montalto
- Pietro-Siniscalco Guardati Nobleman born in 1404 in the Kingdom of Two Sicilies
- Francesco Guardati Patrician of the city of Sorrento, n. June 21, 1811, son of the nobleman Antonio Guardati (15 November 1758 – 15 November 1842).
- Domini Guardato (n. 1100s) Landowner, Merchant, and Knight.
