= Isabel de Requesens =

Portrait of Doña Isabel de Requesens y Enriquez de Cardona-Anglesola by Raphael and Giulio Romano.

Isabel de Requesens i Enríquez (1496 - Naples, 5 March 1532), was Countess of Palamós, Trivento and Avellino, Lady of the Barony of Calonge in her own right and Vicereine consort of Sicily and Naples by her marriage to Ramón Folch de Cardona-Anglesola.

== Biography ==
Isabel was the daughter of naval commander Galceran de Requesens, 1st Count of Palamós and Beatriz Enríquez de Velasco. She was orphaned as a child, and inherited a large fortune and a good part of her paternal titles. Upon her father's death, the County of Palamós was inherited by her uncle Lluís de Requesens, and when he died, Isabel disputed the county with her cousin Estefania de Requesens. Although Estefania won the lawsuit, she finally ceded the county to Isabel.

Before his death, her father had designed a policy of alliances to increase the family's power and one of the moves he envisaged was the marriage of his eldest daughter Isabel to her first cousin, Ramón Folch de Cardona-Anglesola, Duke of Soma and Baron of Bellpuig, who later became Viceroy of Sicily and Naples.

After his appointment as Viceroy of Naples in 1509, the couple took up residence in the Castel Nuovo in Naples. Ramón Folch de Cardona-Anglesola was absent for long periods of time, fighting the French in Northern Italy during the War of the League of Cambrai.
Isabella maintained a very active court at Castel Nuovo, inviting renowned intellectuals and artists. She was a great patron, protector of the arts and letters, at a time when Naples was a leading cultural capital.
After a few years the viceroys were increasingly questioned and accused of wasting public money on the sumptuous court they maintained. This period came to an end in 1522, when Ramón de Cardona died and was replaced by Charles de Lannoy, 1st Prince of Sulmona.

Doña Isabel died on 5 March 1532, at the age of 36 and rests in the church of Santa Annunziata in Naples.
She had given birth to 4 children. Antoni, disabled from birth, was born in 1513, followed by Maria, of whom no trace remains. A second daughter, Beatriz, died at fourteen and was buried in the summer of 1535 in the tomb of her mother.
The second son, Ferran (or Fernando), born in 1521, inherited the titles upon his father's death in 1522.

=== Painting by Raphael ===
Isabel de Requesens is best known for her portrait by Raphael. Although it was a fairly well-known work, it was not until 1997 that research by Professor Michael P. Fritz brought to light that she was the protagonist and not Giovanna d'Aragona, as had been believed until then. The original, which can be seen in the Louvre Museum, dates from 1518, and it is known that it was acquired by Cardinal Bernardo Dovizi da Bibbiena to give it to King Francis I of France.

This painting is part of the diplomatic action undertaken by the Medici Pope Leo X, who commissioned several religious paintings from Raphael's workshop to present the French monarch and count on his support in the war against the Turks. Already in France, the cardinal saw that what interested the king most were female portraits, and that is why he commissioned Raphael's workshop to paint a portrait of a lady who stood out for her beauty.
They chose Isabel de Requesens as their model, who curiously was the wife of one of the French monarch's great enemies, Ramón Folch de Cardona-Anglesola. The art historian Joanna Woods-Marden, in a study on female portraiture, considers this portrait, in which Isabel wears a striking red dress, as an example of the eroticization of female portraiture in the Renaissance.
