= Portrait of Alfonso d'Avalos with a Page =

Painting by Titian

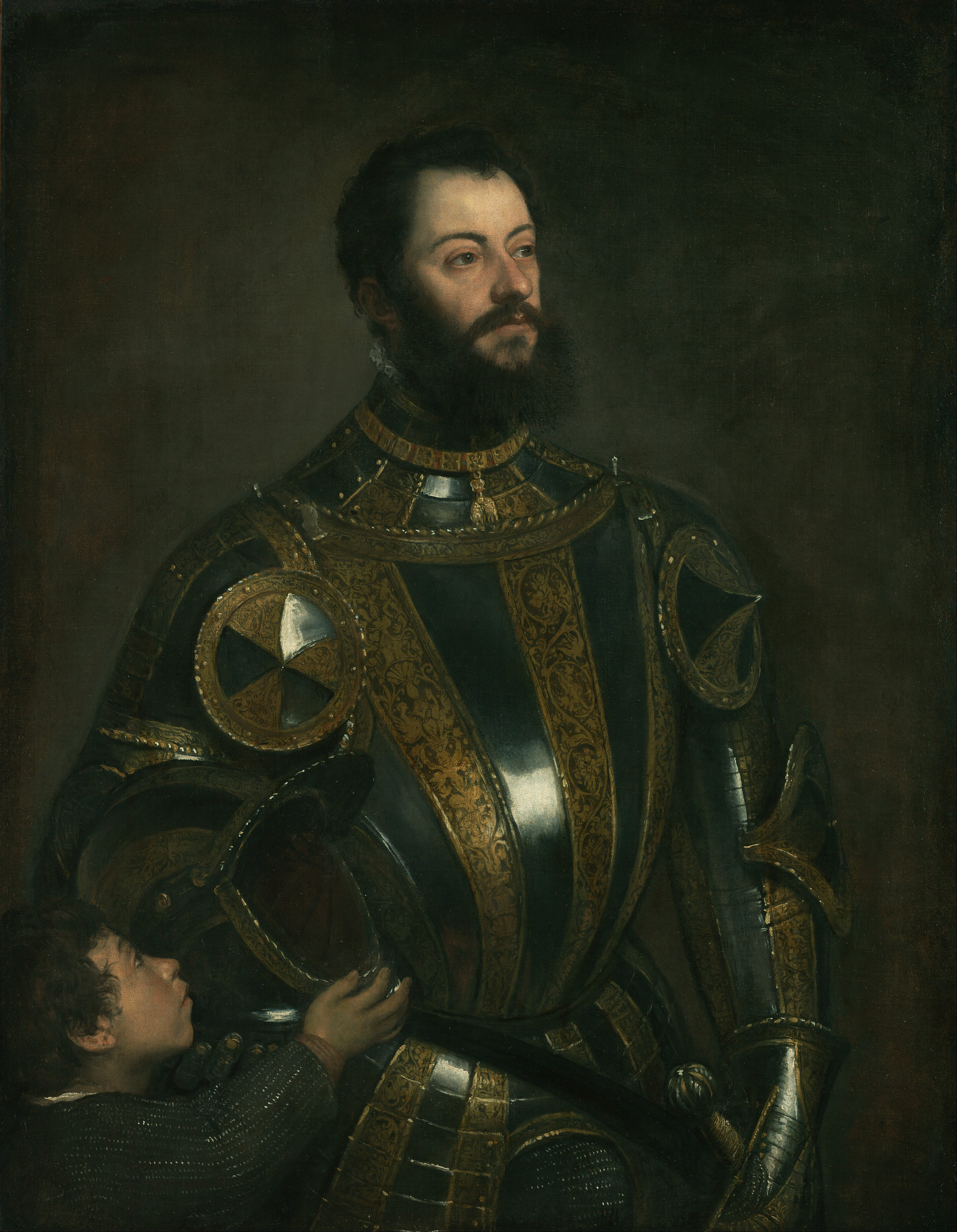
- Artist: Titian
- Year: c. 1533
- Type: Oil on canvas
- Dimensions: 110 cm × 80 cm (43.3 in × 31.4 in)
- Location: J. Paul Getty Museum; Los Angeles

Portrait of Alfonso d'Avalos with a Page is a 1533 portrait by Titian of Alfonso d'Avalos, a general in the service of Charles V, Holy Roman Emperor. It has been in the J. Paul Getty Museum, in Los Angeles, since 2004. After Venus and Adonis (1555–1560) and Penitent Magdalene (1555–1561), it was the third Titian work to enter the Getty collection.

== History ==
Titian produced the work in Bologna. It was inherited by the subject's son marquis Francesco Ferdinando d'Avalos (c. 1530–1571) and probably remained in the family for a time after this. It moved to Poland at an unknown date and was owned by kings John III Sobieski and Stanislaus Augustus. It was probably then donated to the Potocki family, who retained it until 1921, when Alfred Potocki sold it to countess Martine-Marie-Pol de Béhague (1870–1939). She left it and the rest of her collection to her nephew Hubert de Ganay.

In 1989 de Ganay's heirs auctioned off much of the collection at Sotheby's in Monte Carlo and the following year the insurance company Axa acquired the Titian for 65 million francs. Axa lent the painting to the Louvre for twelve years, with the option to buy it for 65 million francs plus inflation, a preferential price. The deal was arranged by the Louvre's director Pierre Rosenberg, but his successor Henri Loyrette let the twelve years expire, leaving the Getty to buy the work for $70 million. Since the painting was in private hands and the Réunion des Musées Nationaux had decided against purchasing it, the French state could not veto its sale outside of France.

== See also ==
- List of works by Titian
- List of most expensive paintings
