= Wratislaw von Fürstenberg =

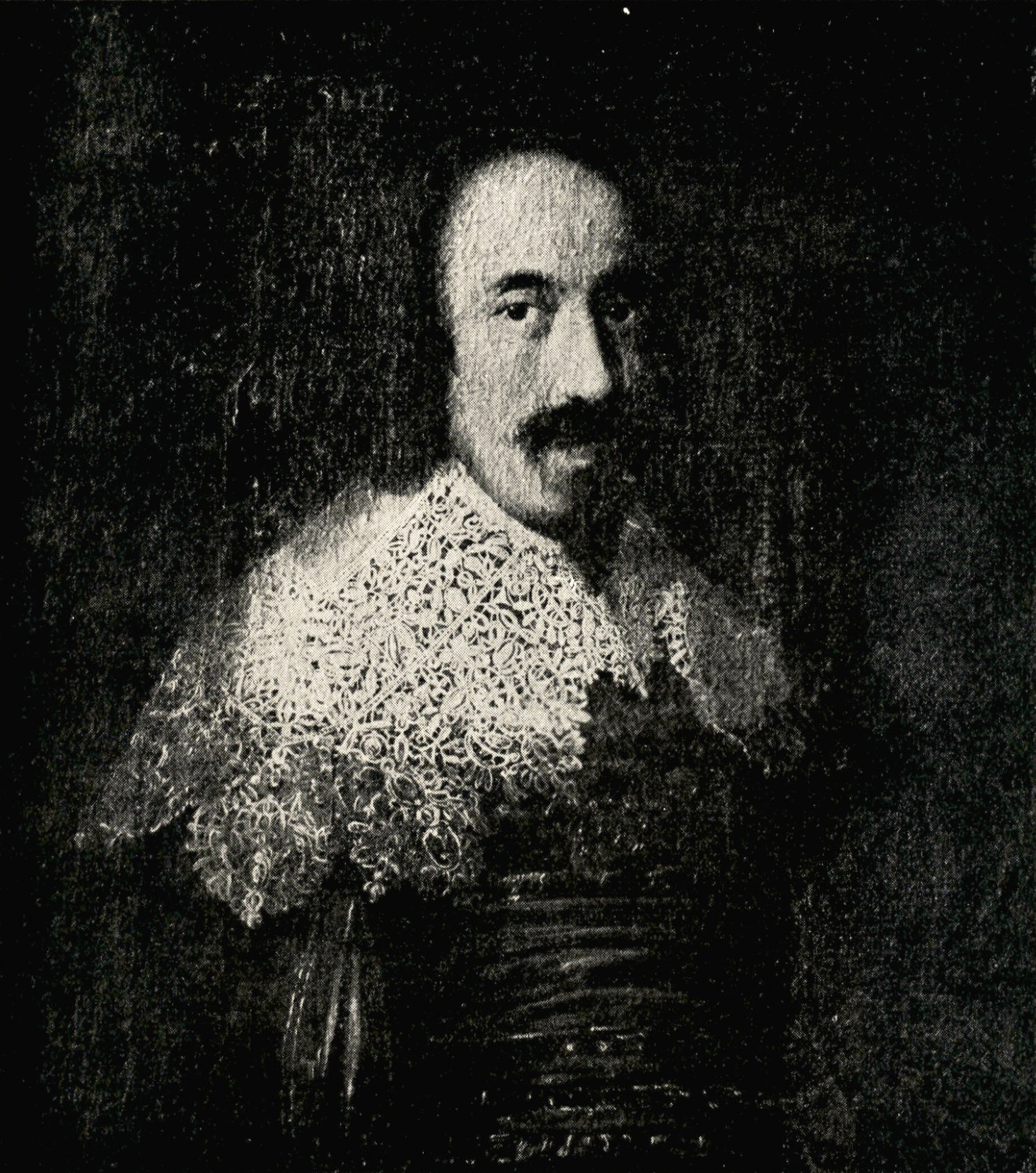
Painting of Wratislaw I, Count of Fürstenberg

Wratislaw I, Count of Fürstenberg (also called Wratislaw the Elder) (31 January 1584 – 10 July 1631) was an officer in Spanish and Austrian service, as well as a diplomat and President of the Imperial Court Council.

== Early life ==
Count Wratislaw was born on 31 January 1584 in Prague into the Kinzig Valley line of the Fürstenberg family. He was a son of Count Albrecht I von Fürstenberg and Baroness Elisabeth von Pernštejn. His older brother was Christoph II von Fürstenberg. After his father's death, he and his brother agreed on a division of the inheritance. Wratislaw received the Lordship of Möhringen, after which he took his name, Count of Fürstenberg-Möhringen.

Wratislaw received his education in Prague.

== Career ==
After his education was completed, he began a military career and learned the art of war in the Netherlands. He served under Ambrogio Spinola on the Spanish side in the war against the Netherlands. He held positions and received awards at the Court of Infanta Isabella Clara Eugenia of Spain. In 1617, King Philip III of Spain admitted him to the Order of the Golden Fleece and placed ten Companies of Infantry under his command. He rose to the rank of Colonel.

Count Wratislaw entered Imperial service and recruited five companies for Emperor Matthias for the War against the Bohemian Revolt. In 1619 he served the Emperor as Ambassador in Paris. He helped to ensure that France stayed out of the outbreak of the Thirty Years' War. A memorandum he wrote on political issues was published. Later he undertook a successful diplomatic trip to Spain, which ended in 1621. As a thank you for his services he was given the confiscated Kornhaus estate in Bohemia. Emperor Ferdinand II appointed him a Privy Councillor. His last position was President of the Imperial Court Council.

== Personal life ==
Fürstenberg was married three times. In 1608, he married Margareth of Croÿ (1568–1614). The widow of Pierre de Hénin, 4th Count of Bossu, Margareth was a daughter of Philippe III de Croÿ, 3rd Duke of Aarschot, and Johanna Henriëtte van Halewijn. This marriage remained childless.

After her death, he married Catherine Livia de la Verdetierra in 1615. She brought a large dowry into the marriage. Before her death on 1 July 1627 in Brussels, they were the parents of a son:

- Albrecht II von Fürstenberg (1619–1640), a Lieutenant colonel who died during the Siege of Hohentwiel on 8 October 1640. (Note: The commander of the Hohentwiel fortress, Konrad Widerholt, demanded a ransom of 300 ducats for his body, which he received from Albert's relatives.)

He married for the third time in 1628, to Lavinia Gonzaga, Countess of Novellara, a daughter of Caterina d'Avalos (a daughter of Alfonso Félix de Ávalos Aquino y Gonzaga, Marquess del Vasto), and Camillo II Gonzaga, 5th Count of Novellara. Their children were

- Franz Wratislaw von Fürstenberg (1631–1641), who died young.
- Eleonora Katharina von Fürstenberg (1630–1676), who married Franz Wilhelm I von Hohenems at Vaduz Castle; together with her brother-in-law, she was sovereign of the County of Vaduz and the Lordship of Schellenberg from 1662 to 1670.

Fürstenberg died on 10 July 1631 in Vienna. After his death, Lavinia married Count Otto Friedrich von Harrach. With his son Albrecht's death, the Möhringen line of the Fürstenbergs died out. (Note: He was the first of his family to introduce the right of primogeniture (which was confirmed by the Emperor).)
