= Portrait of Doña Isabel de Requesens y Enríquez de Cardona-Anglesola =

16th-century oil painting

- Artist: Giulio Romano and Raphael
- Year: c. 1518
- Catalogue: INV 612
- Type: Oil on panel, transferred to canvas
- Dimensions: 120 cm × 95 cm (47 in × 37 in)
- Location: Louvre, Paris

Portrait of Doña Isabel de Requesens y Enríquez de Cardona-Anglesola is an oil painting dated circa 1518 that was formerly believed to depict Giovanna d'Aragona. It has been variously ascribed to Raphael, Giulio Romano, or the school of Raphael; it is now usually taken to have been executed by Giulio Romano based on a sketch by Raphael and then altered by Raphael. The painting is now in the Louvre Museum in Lens.

== History ==
The portrait of "the vicereine of Naples" was commissioned from Raphael in 1518 by Cardinal Bibbiena on behalf of Pope Leo X for Francis I of France, who collected portraits of beautiful women. Pierre de Bourdeille, seigneur de Brantôme took the description to refer to Giovanna d'Aragona (1502 – 1575); a study in 1997 demonstrated that the subject was rather Isabel de Requesens, the wife of Ramón de Cardona, who was viceroy of Naples from 1509 to 1522. According to Vasari, Raphael sent Giulio Romano, one of his young assistants, to Naples to paint the portrait, except for the face, which he was responsible for; documentary evidence survives in Raphael's hand confirming Giulio Romano's work on this commission. The face has indeed been altered; otherwise Vasari's description might also apply to another portrait which has been attributed to Giulio Romano and Raphael, Isabella of Aragon as Mona Lisa, depicting Isabella of Aragon, Duchess of Milan, also known as Isabella of Naples.

Opinions have varied as to who executed the cartoon for the Portrait of Doña Isabel de Requesens, which was likely reused for that of Isabella of Aragon; Luitpold Dussler considered the painting entirely Giulio Romano's work. However, both portraits are now generally thought to have been executed to Raphael's design, and the two paintings have been referred to as Raphael's Giocondae for their visual references to Leonardo's Mona Lisa (also known as La Gioconda), which was already in Francis I's collection. It is also possible that the portrait of Isabella of Aragon is a copy; the gallery that holds it, the Doria Pamphilj Gallery in Rome, lists it as "after" Raphael.

A number of copies of the painting exist, and Vasari states that one copy entirely by Giulio Romano was made at the same time and included in the gift to the king; Brantôme reported having seen one version in the king's apartments at Fontainebleau, the other in the queen's.

The Portrait of Doña Isabel de Requesens was restored by Francesco Primaticcio in the mid-16th century and transferred from the original wood to canvas either then or in the 18th century.

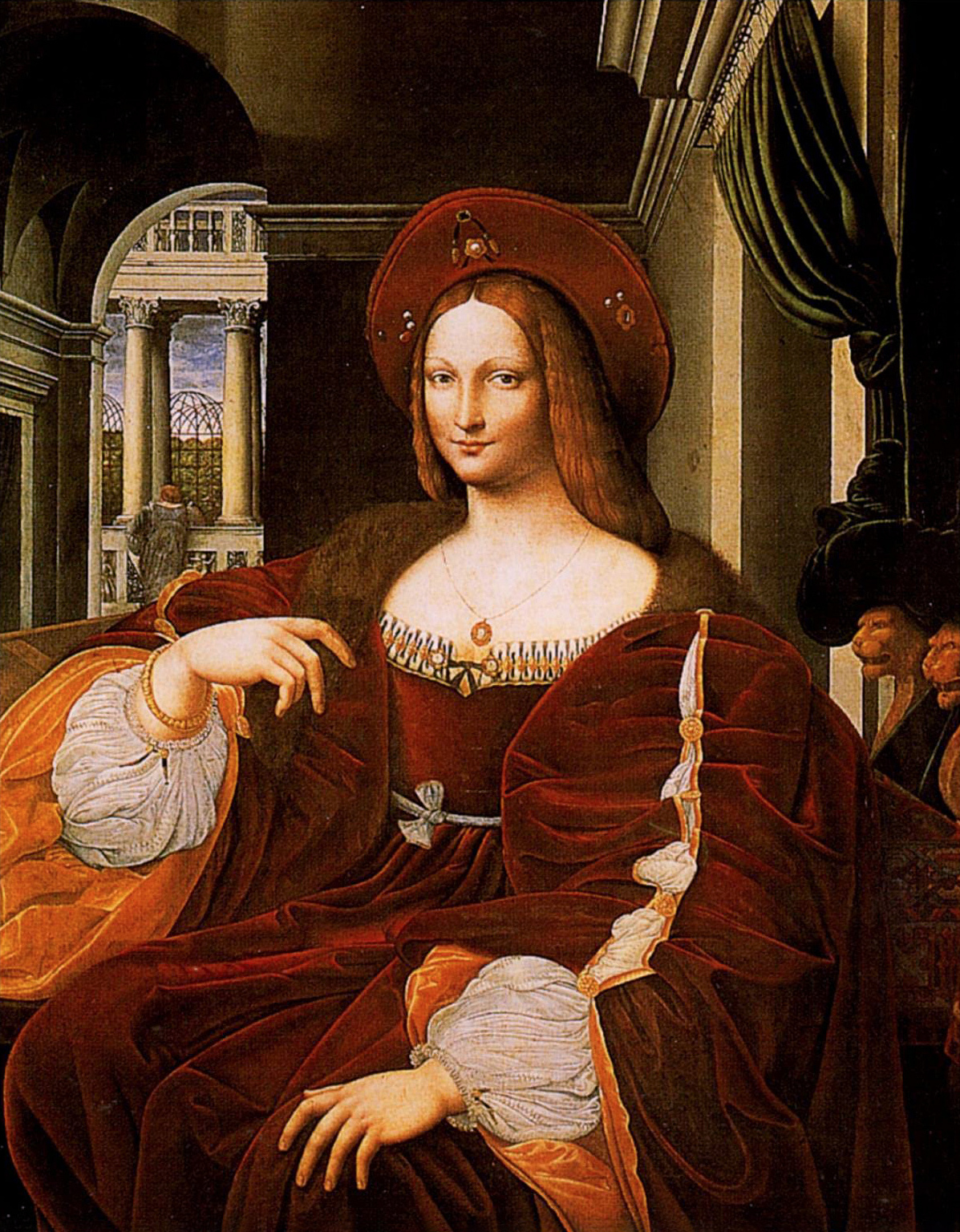
Portrait of Isabella of Naples, also attributed to Giulio Romano and Raphael

== Description ==
The subject is portrayed seated, turned to the viewer's left, wearing a deep red velvet dress trimmed with gold whose sleeves are slashed to reveal the cream fabric of her chemise, and a hat with jewels on the brim, whose shape suggests a halo. She is portrayed in three-quarters length, one hand fingering the fur around her shoulders, the other resting on one knee. In the background a woman leans against the railing of a loggia overlooking a garden; the vault is a visual quotation from the story of Cupid and Psyche as painted by Raphael on the ceiling of the Loggia di Psiche at the Villa Farnesina in Rome. Her loose hair, the red garments (the colour of love for Petrarch), and her meeting the viewer's gaze are all sensuous details; further, the portrait is innovative in including her knees, which in addition are visibly parted, and in not having her hands chastely together as a barrier. The composition corresponds to that of other Raphael portraits in being based on the musical ratio 9/12/16.

Both Isabel de Requesens and Giovanna d'Aragona were famous beauties; Giovanna was the subject of a poem by Agostino Nifo, "De pulchro et amore", and it has been suggested that the beauty in the painting was as much formulaic as true to life.

Both Giocondae portraits feature carved cats on the right which resemble lions, a punning allusion to Leonardo. The woman in the background is replaced by a man in the portrait of Isabella of Naples; they may allude respectively to the sitter and the artist in the Mona Lisa.

Manet likely had this painting in mind when he painted his regal picture of his wife Suzanne, The Reading.
