= Carl Philipp von Wylich und Lottum =

Prussian field marshal

no Carl Philipp, Reichsgraf von Wylich und Lottum
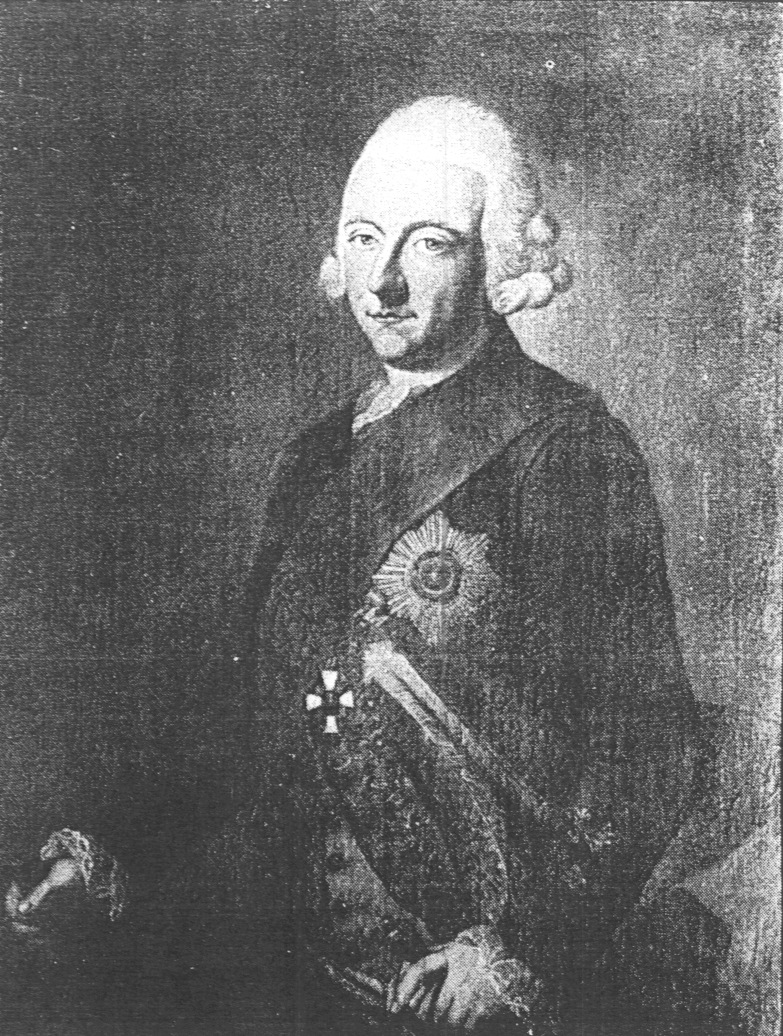
- Born: 27 August 1650
- Died: 14 February 1719 (aged 68)
- Spouse: Maria Dorothea von Schwerin
- Military career
- Rank: Field marshal
- Commands: Prussian Army
- Conflicts: War of the Spanish Succession; Battle of Blenheim; Battle of Oudenarde

Carl Philipp Reichsgraf von Wylich und Lottum (Diersfordt, 27 August 1650 – Wesel, 14 February 1719) was a Prussian field marshal.

== Early life ==
Philipp Carl was the son of Johann Sigismund von Wylich und Lottum (died 25 June 1678) and Josina von Wittenhorst-Sonsfeld (died 7 November 1677). He entered the Dutch army in 1668 and fought in the Franco-Dutch War, ending the war as lieutenant colonel.

== Military career ==
On 1 August 1687 he entered the service of the Margraviate of Brandenburg as colonel at the head of a regiment. He became Commandant of Wesel, and on 1 September 1692 Governor of Minden. He fought the French again between 1691 and 1693 in the Low Countries. On 20 September 1698 he became governor of the Spandau Citadel. On 17 January 1701 he became a Knight in the Order of the Black Eagle and was made a Count by Holy Roman Emperor Leopold I.

At the outbreak of the War of Spanish Succession he was made supreme commander of the Prussian troops in the Netherlands. In 1703 he besieged Rheinberg and Geldern, and later Lille and Tournai. He fought in the Battle of Blenheim and played an important role in the victories in the Battle of Oudenaarde (11 July 1708) and the Battle of Malplaquet (11 September 1709).

On 27 February 1713 the new King Frederick William I of Prussia named him Field Marshal and member of the Secret War Council. When Prussia received the Duchy of Cleves, Lottum became President of this territory.

== Personal life ==
Philipp Karl von Wylich und Lottum married Maria Dorothea von Schwerin (Königsberg, 20 April 1662 - Berlin, 19 October 1695). After her death he remarried in 1696 Albertine Charlotte Freiin von Quadt Wickerad zu Zoppenbruch (died 6 March 1752). He had 7 daughters and 6 sons, of whom Johann Christoph and Ludwig became Prussian Generals.
