= Nicholas Bobadilla =

English Jesuit (1511–1590)

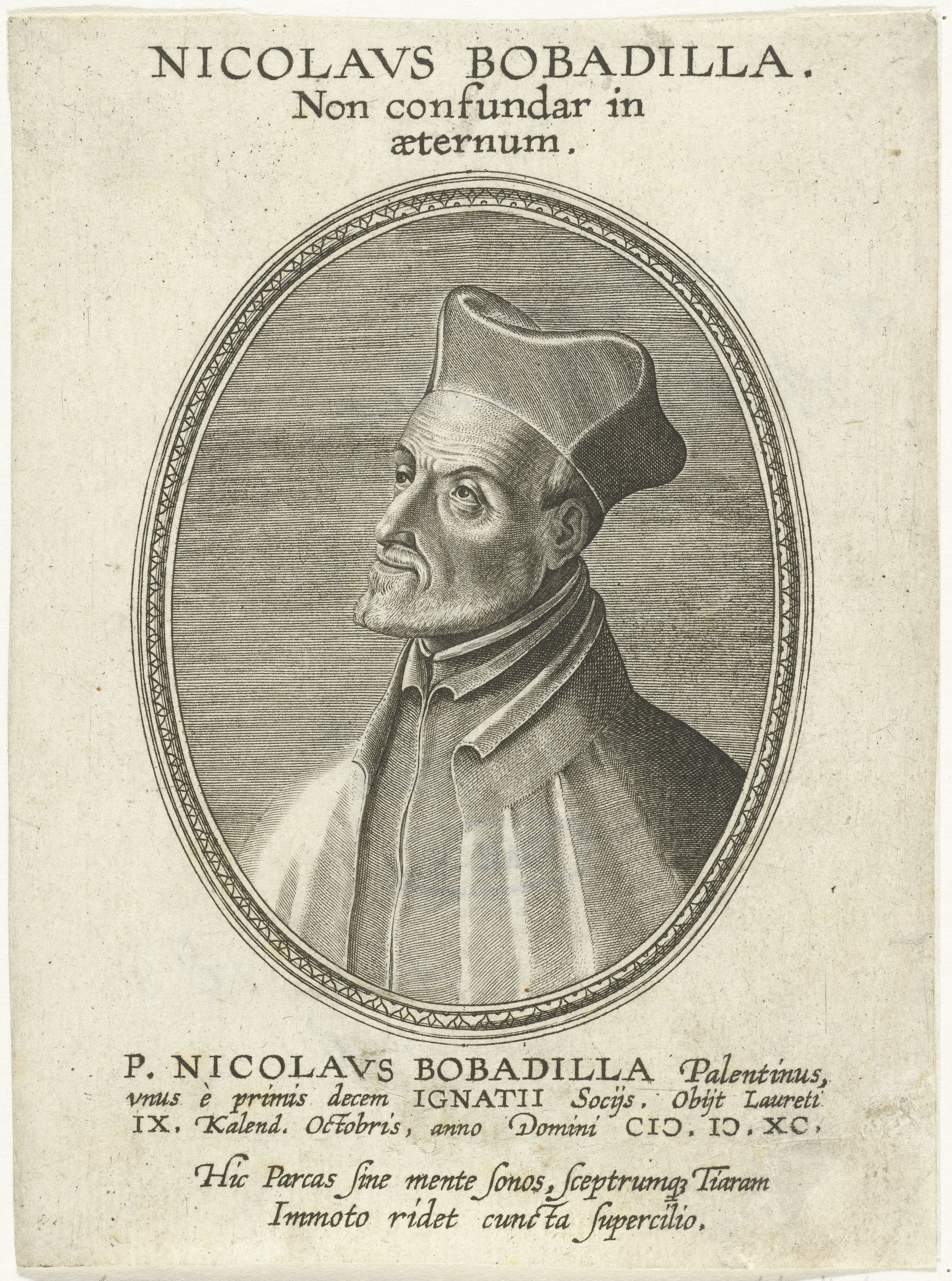
Nicholas Bobadilla

Nicholas Bobadilla, SJ (c.1509 – 23 September 1590) was one of the first Jesuits. A native of Spain, he spent most of his career in Germany.

== Biography ==
Nicholas Bobadilla was born in Spain in about 1509 and was educated at Alcalá de Henares where in 1529 he earned a bachelor's degree. He taught logic at Valladolid while studying theology.

In 1533 he went to Paris to acquire a more perfect knowledge of Greek, Latin and Hebrew. Here he fell under the influence of Ignatius of Loyola while studying at the University of Paris.

Bobadilla was among the first seven followers of Loyola to consecrate themselves to God in the Chapel of Saint-Denis on Montmartre, 15 August 1534. Two years later, the group, minus Ignatius who had returned temporarily to Spain, went to Venice, hoping to embark for the Holy Land. They worked in hospitals while waiting for a ship. After two months, they went to Rome to ask papal permission for their pilgrimage and Holy orders for those not yet ordained. Bobadilla was ordained in Rome on June 24, 1537. They returned to Venice, but an impending war with the Turks delayed their departure. While Ignatius went to Rome, the rest decided to go to various university towns and preach. Bobadilla and Francis Xavier went to Bologna.

When Giovanna d'Aragona, Duchess of Tagliacozzo, left her husband, Ascanio Colonna, and took their six children to Ischia, given the rank of the parties involved, the matter stirred up controversy among the Italo-Spanish nobility and in the papal court. Ignatius sent Bobadilla to attempt to persuade her to return to her husband. When this failed, he, himself visited her, but to no avail. Nonetheless, she donated to the Jesuits land on the Quirinal Hill to build their first seminary; now the site of Sant'Andrea al Quirinale.

Bobadilla was an effective speaker and saw the early Jesuits as living as the apostles. He preferred the role of itinerant preacher to that of establishing colleges as pastoral centers, which sometimes caused a degree of friction with his colleagues. King John III of Portugal had asked Pope Paul III to send priests to the new colony in India. Ignatius chose Simon Rodrigues and Bobadilla, but the latter got sick and could not go. Xavier took his place.

He was for a time attached to the papal nunciature in Germany, serving among the armies of the Emperor Charles V. In 1540, while tending the sick in the camp about Ratisbon, he himself caught the plague, but recovered. Bishop Giovanni Morone was papal legate in Germany; in 1542 Bobadilla traveled with him to the Diet of Speyer. Later that year he was at the court of Ferdinand I, King of the Romans in Vienna and accompanied the king to the Diet of Nuremberg in January 1543.

Bobadilla spent most of his long career in Germany and Italy, using his formidable intellectual and rhetorical prowess against the spread of Protestantism. He took a prominent part in the Diet of Ratisbon in 1546. That same year, as he was returning from camp into the city, he was waylaid by assassins and severely wounded. At another time he barely escaped with his life from an attempt to poison him. He was present at the Battle of Mühlberg in 1547.

He sometimes displeased Ignatius, as when he too strenuously opposed the efforts of Charles V to make peace with the Protestants. In 1548, the Augsburg Interim was published by the Emperor. It was a tentative document intended to suggest a basis of agreement between Catholics and Protestants until their religious differences could be definitely settled. But as it seemed to the eyes of many Catholics to go to far, and in the eyes of many Protestants not far enough, it satisfied neither party. Bobadilla opposed it in speech and in writing, and so vigorously, that though he was highly esteemed in the imperial court, he was obliged, by the Emperor's order to leave Germany.

He went to Italy and then Dalmatia before returning to Italy in 1561. The last survivor of the seven first companions of Ignatius of Loyola, Bobadilla took part in the election of four generals of the Society of Jesus. He died at Loreto, Italy, in 1590.

== Bibliography ==
- Castellani, Giuseppe (1930). "BOBADILLA, Nicolás Alfonso de". Enciclopedia Italiana. Rome: Istituto dell'Enciclopedia Italiana.
