= Diana Guardato =

Spanish aristocrat

Diana Guardato was a member of the aristocratic Patrician Guardato family. She had at least two children with King Ferdinand I.

Her first child was Fernando de Aragón, 1st Duke of Montalto who married 1st, Anna Sanseverino, 2nd, Castellana de Cardona whose daughter Maria d'Aragona, married Antonio Todeschini Piccolomini, Duke of Amalfi, a nephew of Pope Pius II and brother of Pope Pius III.

Her second child was Giovanna d’ Aragona, who married Leonardo della Rovere, Duke of Arce and Sora, a nephew of Pope Sixtus IV and brother of Pope Julius II.
