= Giovanna d'Aragona =

Italian patron of the arts (1502–1575)

Raphael and Giulio Romano, Portrait of Doña Isabel de Requesens y Enriquez de Cardona-Anglesola, previously thought to be of Giovanna d'Aragona

Giovanna d'Aragona (1502– September 11, 1575) was a patron of the arts, printers and religious reform in Naples during the Renaissance.

== Family ==
She was the oldest daughter of Duke Ferdinando of Malteno and Castellana de Cardona. Her father was a younger, illegitimate son of Ferdinand I of Naples by Diana Guardato. Giovanna was a celebrated beauty of her time. She was described as "beautiful, but cold". In 1518, the year of her engagement to Ascanio Colonna, Constable of Naples, Cardinal Bibbiena, papal ambassador to the French court, commissioned a portrait of her from the workshop of his friend Raphael as a gift for the King.

== Life ==
Her parents had fled to the island Ischia after French troops had overrun Naples. Constanza d'Avalos resided here as well and gathered a literary circle around her. Amongst them was her sister-in-law, the poet Vittoria Colonna, wife of Constanza's nephew, Fernando d'Ávalos.

In 1521, Giovanna married Vittoria's brother Ascanio. Upon marriage they became Duke and Duchess of Tagliacozzo. The marriage was unhappy, and after giving birth to six children, Giovanna asked Charles V, Holy Roman Emperor for the means to live apart from her husband. He granted her 3,000 scudi a year. Ascanio left for Lombardy, and she, pretending to go to the baths of Pozzuoli, with all Ascanio's possessions, and her children, went to Ischia. The emperor then directed her to the Castel dell'Ovo.

Given the rank of the parties involved, the matter stirred up controversy among the Italo-Spanish nobility and in the papal court. Ignatius of Loyola sent Nicholas Bobadilla to attempt to persuade her to return to her husband. When this failed, he, himself visited her in Alvita, but to no avail. In this she was supported by her son, Marcantonio. Nonetheless, she donated to the Jesuits land on the Quirinal Hill to build their first seminary; now the site of Sant'Andrea al Quirinale.

Despite all this, she remained close to Vittoria and together with Giovanna's sister Maria and Constanza d'Avalos, they supported the religious writer Juan de Valdés. In 1541, when Pope Paul III raised the price of salt, she tried to intercede for her husband, who refused to pay the "salt tax". She also gathered arms and men, and sold jewels for the defense of Paliano. In spite of her mediation, the pope's forces attacked Ascanio's lands and he was imprisoned by an envoy of Charles V.

Like Pope Paul III, Pope Paul IV was an enemy of the Colonna family. In 1556, he held Giovanna under house arrest in Rome and forbade her to arrange marriages for her daughters, perhaps intending them for his nephews. His treatment of Giovanna drew negative comment from Venice because she had long been a patron of artists and writers. She escaped by wearing servants' clothes and fled to Tagliacozzo with her children and servants. In 1560, after the death of Paul IV, she returned to Rome and became a prominent figure in Italy's political and religious life.

The poet Girolamo Ruscelli paid tribute to her in an anthology with work from many contemporary Italian poets.

Giovanna d'Aragona died in Rome on 11 September 1575.
