= Siege of Tournai (1709) =

Siege during the War of the Spanish Succession

- Part of the War of the Spanish Succession
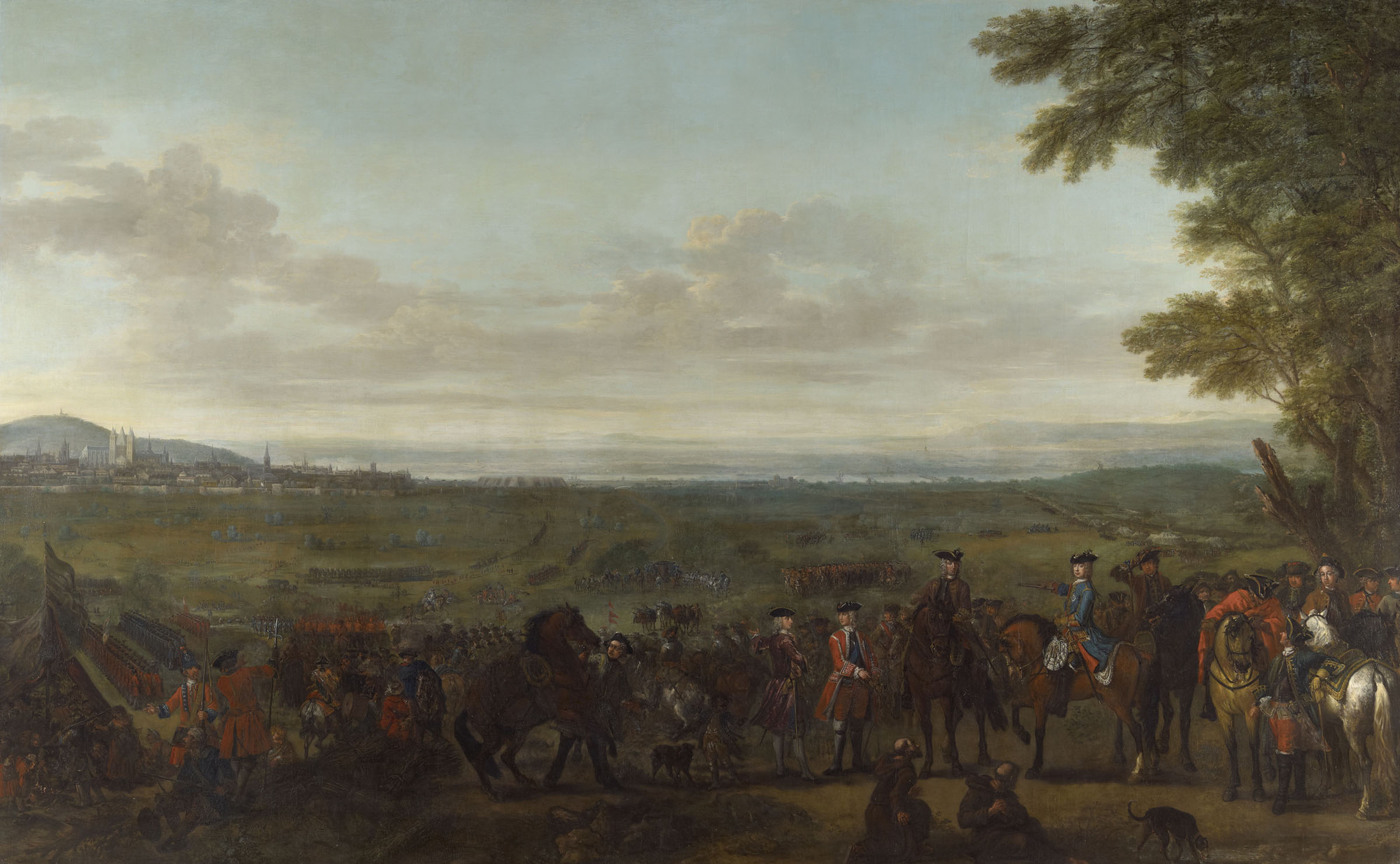
- The Siege of Tournay by John Wootton
Date	28 June – 3 September 1709
Location	Tournai, France 50°36′20″N 03°23′17″E
Result	Grand Alliance victory

Belligerents
Dutch Republic; Great Britain; Habsburg monarchy; Prussia	France

Commanders and leaders
Duke of Marlborough; Eugene of Savoy; François Nicolas Fagel; Reichsgraf von Wylich und Lottum; Johann Matthias von der Schulenburg	Marquis de Surville

Strength
~50,000	7,700

Casualties and losses
5,300	1,729 dead 1,482 wounded
- Location of Tournai in modern day Belgium

The siege of Tournai was a siege of the city of Tournai, then part of the Kingdom of France, between 28 June and 3 September 1709. A Grand Alliance army under the British Duke of Marlborough successfully forced the surrender of the French garrison during the War of the Spanish Succession.

The siege was the first significant engagement of the 1709 campaign. Marlborough intended to take the city quickly, thereby enabling an Allied advance into northern France. The garrison however, under the Marquis de Surville, held out for considerably longer than had been expected and the siege consumed much of the fighting season. It saw extensive use of mining and countermining as the Allies sought to break through strong French fortifications, particularly Tournai's citadel. The British historian, David G. Chandler, described the siege as "one of the hardest fought and least pleasant of modern history".

== Background ==
At the beginning of the 1709 campaign, the Allies were eager to maintain the pressure on Louis XIV by breaking through the line of border fortresses, known as the "Pré carré", and advancing into northern France. However, the Allied commander, Marlborough, considered the positions held by the French Duke of Villars too strong for a frontal assault.

The Allied leaders had now little other choice then to initiate a siege. This played into France's hands as it had an interest in slowing down the campaign. Marlborough's preferred option was attacking Ypres. The capture of this city close to the coast would be popular in England and the city was less strongly defended than Tournai. In addition, the artillery train was already near that city and its surrounding fertile regions could well sustain a large army. Eugene of Savoy, Count Tilly and the Dutch field deputies disagreed. A siege of Ypres would expose Brabant to a French attack and might also allow her to control the important Scheldt river. A siege of Tournai, on the other hand, would better secure Ghent and Oudenaarde, neither of which were strong cities, and strengthen the Allied supply lines. In addition, it was known that Tournai, although a very strong city, possessed a relatively weak garrison. As a result, the Allies (Note: The Allied council of war which made the decision included Marlborough, Eugene of Savoy, Count Tilly, who was the most senior Dutch commander, the Dutch field deputies and Quartermaster generals Earl of Cadogan and Daniël van Dopff.) agreed to make the strategic city of Tournai the main objective for 1709.

Following the 1667 siege of Tournai, Louis XIV had ordered the construction of significant defences around Tournai, including a citadel, between 1667 and 1674. The director of the works was Guillaume Deshouillères, occasionally supervised by the great military engineer Vauban. The work had the shape of a pentagon with five bastions connected by curtain walls, and a so-called Royal door, an emergency exit. The whole fortification was surrounded by an enclosure made up of ditches and ramparts whose glacis, facing towards the city, ended in a vast esplanade.

Owing to its impressive fortifications and garrison, Tournai was one of the strongest French fortresses by 1709. Lieutenant-General Louis-Charles de Hautefort de Surville was given command of the city. The garrison consisted of 13½ battalions (9 of them regular line infantry), 5 free corps, 2 artillery companies and 2 Irish brigades, for a total of approximately 7,700 men. This was, however, too few soldiers to man the city's extensive network of fortifications. Tournai had enough provisions and ammunition to sustain a siege of four months.

== Siege ==
=== 28 June to 29 July ===
On 24 June 1709, the Allied force feigned an attack on Ypres and successfully forced Villars to re-manoeuvre his army. The allies then turned towards Tournai. By noon of 27 June, most of Marlborough's British and Dutch soldiers were in position outside the city. Prince Eugène's force arrived at Tournai that evening and the following morning. As Marlborough and Eugène's forces marched on Tournai the Prince of Orange was tasked with capturing Mortange and Saint-Amand, to safeguard the siege operations against French attacks from the side of Valenciennes. The primary objective was Fort l'Escarpe, which controlled the crossing of the Scheldt. Orange was fortunate when, after only a dozen shots from his accompanying field guns, the drawbridge unexpectedly fell without being destroyed. Taking advantage of this, his troops swiftly stormed the fort, met little resistance, and captured the garrison. On the night of 28 to 29 June, Prince Eugène ordered the construction of bridges over the swampy ground surrounding the Tournai to enable communication between Allied positions on both banks of the Scheldt river. It was decided that Marlborough would conduct the siege while Eugène commanded the covering force.

The Allied soldiers started to dig trenches around Tournai on 30 June. The siege corps, under the chief in situ Marlborough, consisted of 60 infantry battalions and 70 cavalry squadrons. The Allied force was mainly made up of British, Austrian, Prussian and Dutch soldiers, with smaller numbers of Danish, Hessian and Hanoverian troops. In response to the Allied arrival outside the city, Surville had all of the water locks blocked, causing the river to accumulate in such a way that made getting between the two banks of the Scheldt nearly impossible. Nonetheless, by 4–6 July the Allied forces had surrounded the city with trenches and the garrison of Tournai was denied any communication with the outside.

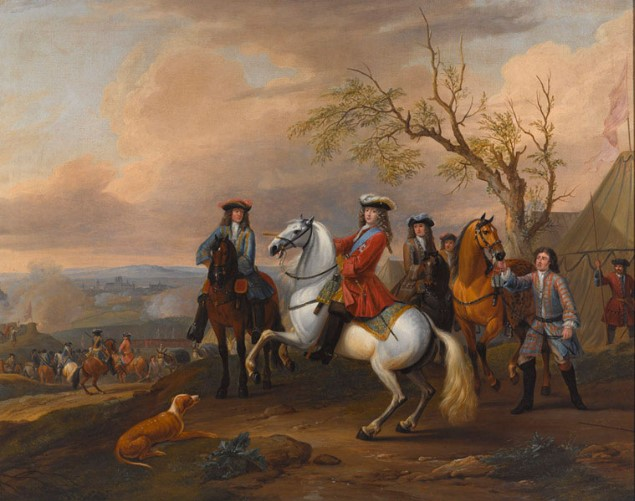
The Duke of Marlborough, allied commander during the siege of Tournai

Marlborough was eager to end the siege as quickly as possible. On the night of 8 to 9 July, the Allies conducted simultaneous attacks on three sections of the fortifications. The first and largest was commanded by Lieutenant-General Lottum, the second by Lieutenant-General Fagel and the third by General Schulenburg. The besieging troops made it to within 200-300 paces of the counterscarp, but heavy rain delayed further work. On 10 July, elements of Lieutenant-General Bettendorf's Allied siege artillery finally reached Tournai. The French sallied out with 500 men, but the Spanish regiment in the vanguard deserted and the remainder of the force returned to the city.

By 11 July, the remainder of the siege artillery had arrived at Tournai. Overall, 100 heavy guns and 60 mortars had been transported by ship from Ghent. However, due to the heavy rain, the Allied trenches were filled with water and the artillery pieces could not be put in position. The shelling of Tournai finally began on 13 July and within a week the besiegers managed to drive the French out of their entrenchments in front of the citadel. On the night of 20 to 21 July, the French attempted a sortie near the Valenciennes Gate. The effort was repulsed, but the French succeeded in disrupting Allied siege works. The following night, a similar French sally was repulsed.

On the night of 26 July, Allied troops captured the sluice and important outer-works on all three approaches. On 28 July, Eugène and Marlborough inspected the siege works, while a French sortie employing 200 men was repulsed. Surville held a council of war where it was decided to surrender the city and to retreat to the citadel with what was left of the garrison (approximately 4–5,000 out of 7,700 French soldiers). On 29 July, Surville surrendered the city of Tournai.

=== 30 July to 3 September ===
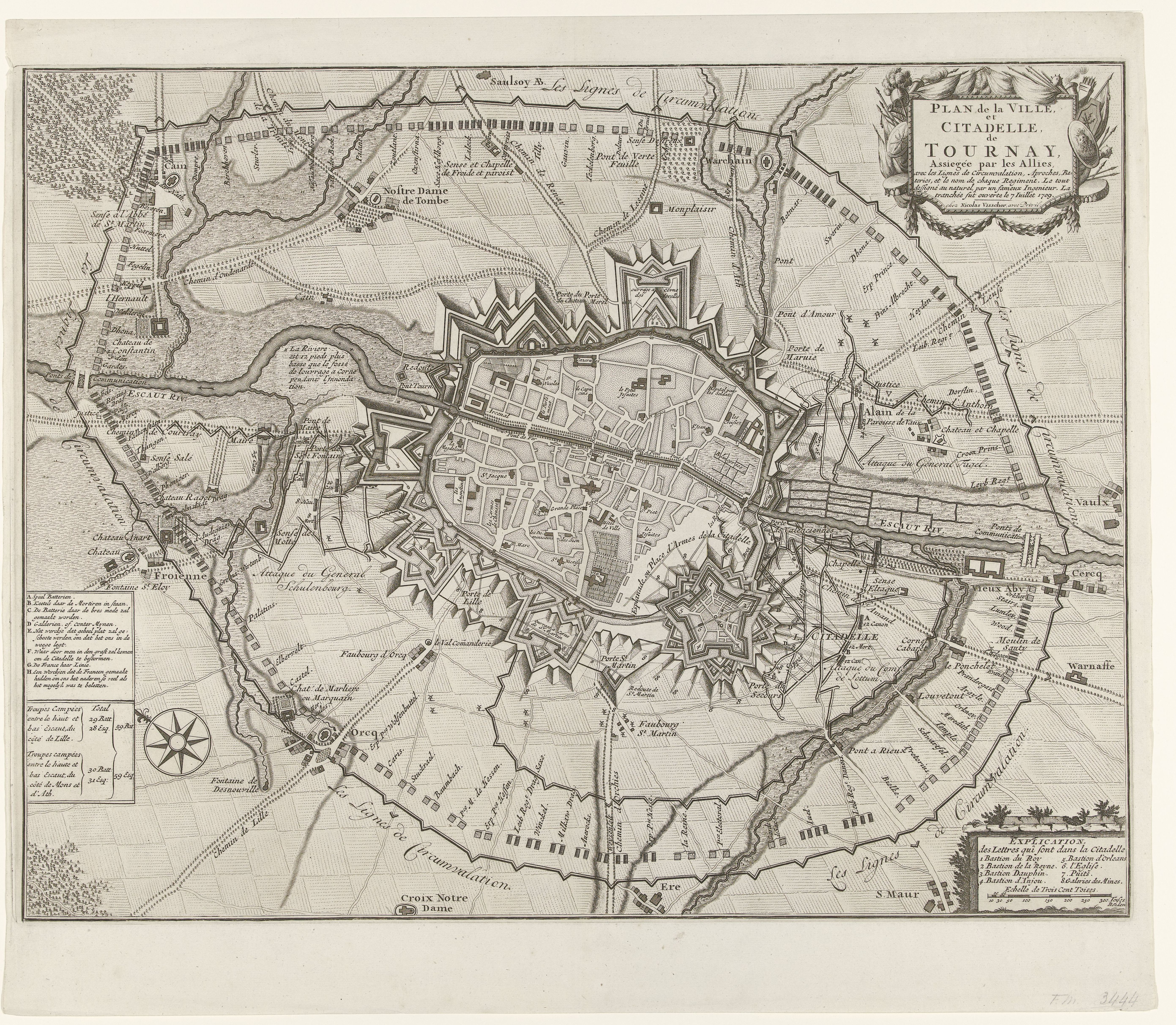
A plan of the city and citadel of Tournai as besieged by the Allies in 1709

On 30 July, Surville retired to the citadel with his remaining 4–5,000 men on the condition that, if he was not relieved by 5 September, the citadel would be handed over to the Allies. The Allies entered the city through the Lille Gate and occupied it with 10 battalions. In the meantime a temporary armistice was agreed between the parties, while Surville sent the Marquis de Ravignan to Versailles to obtain orders from Louis XIV. On the advice of Surville, the French king refused to consider the capitulation of the citadel and ordered the French garrison to continue to resist. Instead, Louis offered a ceasefire on the Flanders front. This was rejected by Marlborough.

Shortly after the surrender of the city, Marlborough relocated his camp to Orchies, 19km south-west of Tournai, so that he could better monitor the movements of Villars' army. He left command of the siege to his Prussian and Dutch officers. On 1 August, Prussian Lieutenant-General Lottum proceeded with the siege of the citadel. The citadel was described by the British soldier John Marshall Deane as "an invincible strong place for mines".

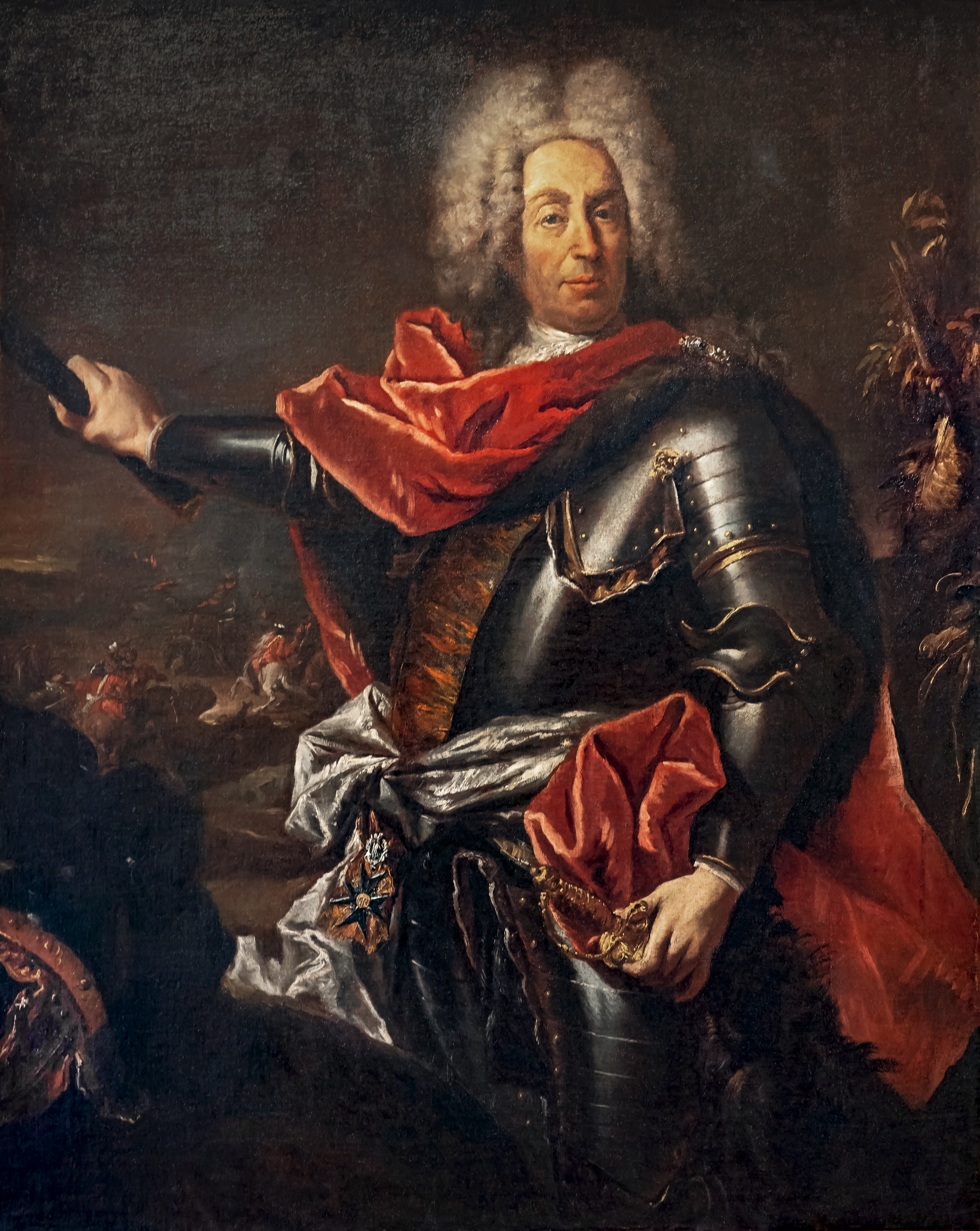
Schulenburg, one the Prussian commanders during the siege

On 8 August, Lieutenant-General von Schulenburg opened a second front of attack, but the coordination between Lottum and Schulenburg was poor. Allied casualties were high, even in the final days of the siege. Mining and countermining became a particular feature of the fight for the citadel, often involving subterranean engagements in terrible conditions. On 26 August, the French blew up a mine which killed more than 400 men. On 27 August, a French attempt to sally from the citadel was betrayed by deserters and repelled by German infantry.

With food supplies running low, on 31 August, Surville offered to surrender to Marlborough, but the Allied commanders rejected his proposals. On 1 September, the Allies resumed the shelling of the citadel. In response, Surville threatened that if the garrison had to surrender as prisoners of war, he would blow up the bastions.

On 3 September, the Duke of Marlborough finally accepted Surville's conditions of surrender. The siege had lasted 69 days. The French garrison, now numbering no more than 2,400 men, left the citadel with the honours of war and returned to France as part of a prisoner exchange.

== Aftermath ==
Villars was furious at the loss of Tournai and it ended his hopes that the siege would keep Marlborough occupied for the rest of the campaign season. Villars blamed Surville for the defeat, branding him an "idiot" for not ensuring the city had enough supplies. He labelled the surrender of Tournai the "most shameful thing in the world". Despite the vigorous French defence resulting in over 5,000 Allied casualties, Surville quickly lost Louis XIV's confidence and he was dismissed from service.

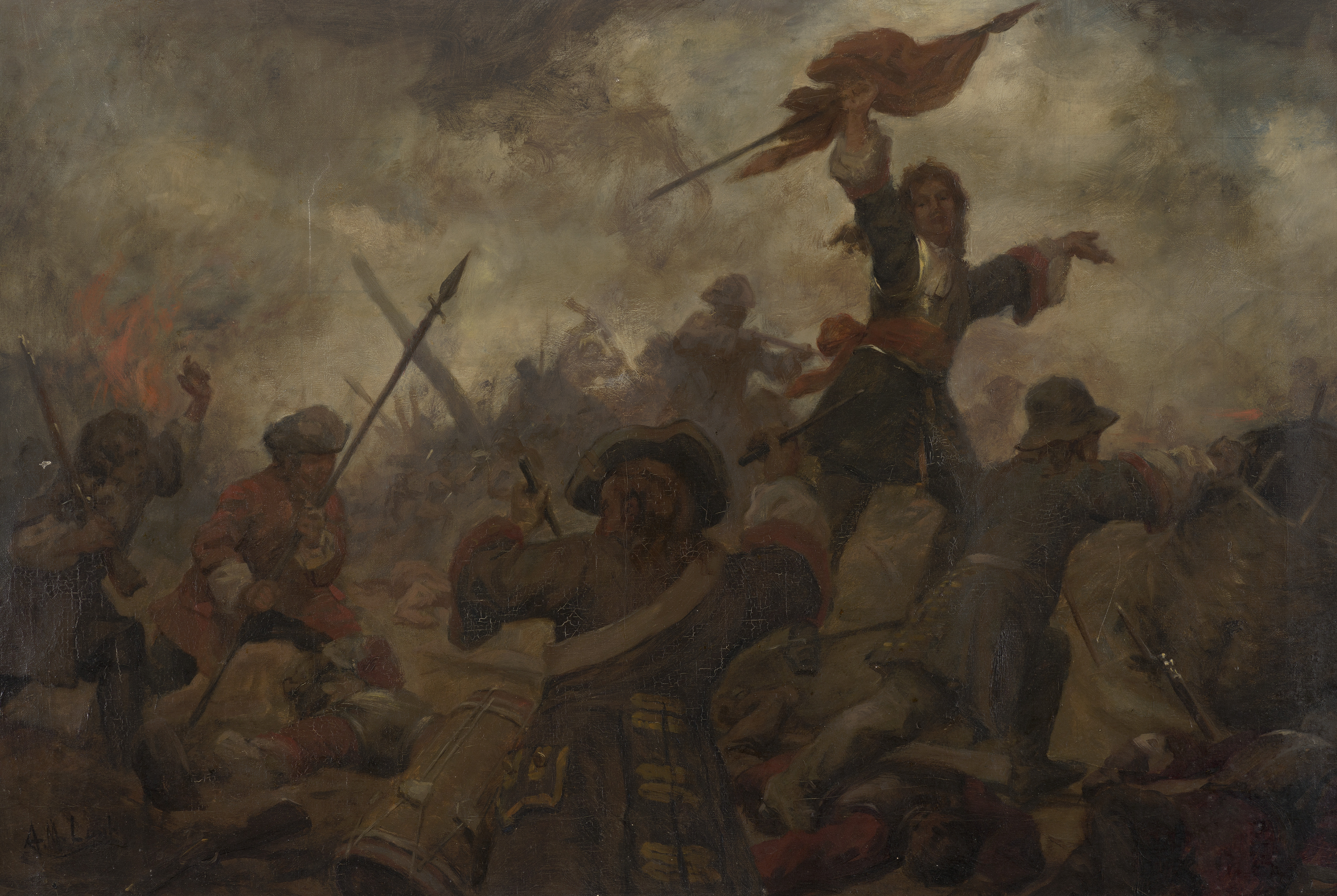
The Prince of Orange leading his Dutch troops at the Battle of Malplaquet.

Following the surrender of Tournai, Marlborough immediately marched his forces to lay siege to Mons. Having assumed Tournai would hold out until at least October and thus consume the entire 1709 campaign season, Louis now ordered Villars to prevent the loss of Mons "at all costs... the salvation of France is at stake". Churchill wrote that "the fall of Tournai was followed by an explosion of war-fury strangely out of keeping with the policy and temper in which the campaign had hitherto been conducted".

The main Allied army arrived east of Mons on 7 September, awaiting the arrival of their siege artillery from Tournai. Villars took up positions to the southwest on 9 September, leaving the two forces facing each other across the gap of Malplaquet. The Battle of Malplaquet took place two days later, one of the most costly battles of the entire war. Tournai's badly damaged defences were only partially repaired over the following decades, something which would be exploited by Maurice de Saxe during the siege of Tournai in 1745 during the War of the Austrian Succession.
