= Alfonso d'Avalos =

16th-century Italian condottiero

Alfonso d'Ávalos
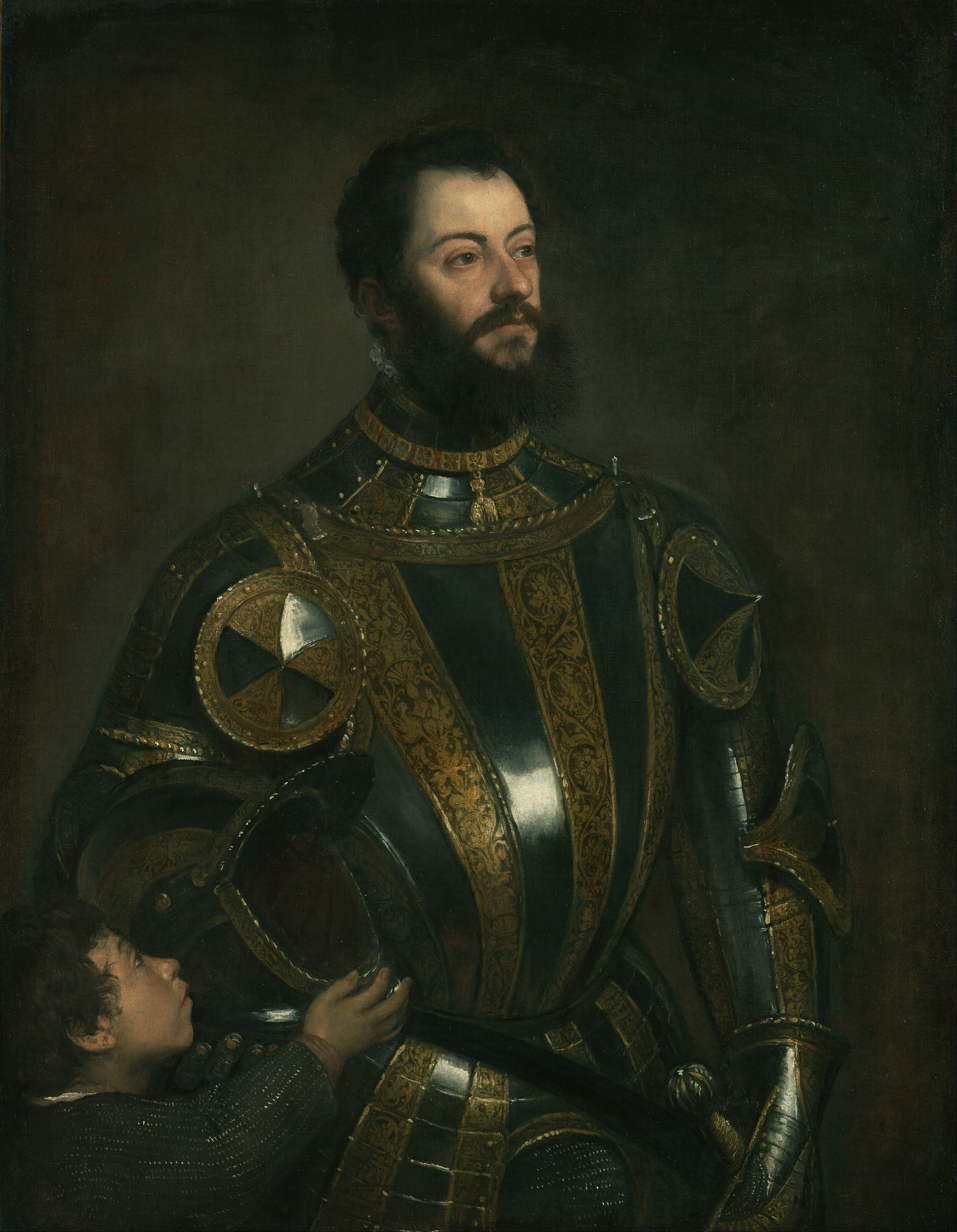
- Portrait of Alfonso d'Avalos and a page by Titian, c. 1533
- Born: 24 May 1502; Ischia, Kingdom of Naples
- Died: 31 March 1546 (aged 43); Vigevano, Lombardy
- Military career
- Allegiance: Kingdom of Naples; Spanish Empire; Holy Roman Empire
- Branch: Army
- Service years: 1522–1540
- Rank: General
- Conflicts: Italian War of 1521–1526; Battle of Pavia; War of the League of Cognac; Siege of Rome; Siege of Naples; Battle of Capo d'Orso; Siege of Monopoli; Ottoman–Habsburg wars; Conquest of Tunis; Italian War of 1542–1546; Siege of Nice; Battle of Ceresole; Battle of Serravalle

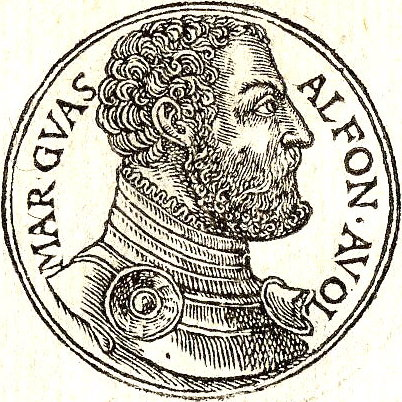
From Guillaume Rouillé's Promptuarii Iconum Insigniorum

Alfonso d'Avalos d'Aquino, 6th Marquis of Pescara, 2nd Marquis of Vasto (1502 – 31 March 1546), was an Italian condottiero of Spanish origins, renowned for his service in favour of Charles V, Holy Roman Emperor and King of Spain.

== Biography ==
Born in Ischia, Alfonso was the son of Inigo d'Avalos and Laura Sanseverino. He inherited the Marquis of Pescara from his cousin Francesco Ferdinando I d'Ávalos.

Alfonso fought the French and the Venetians by his side. He fought at the Battle of Pavia in 1525. During the period 1526-1528, he fought under Hugo of Moncada, being captured on 28 April 1528 by the Genoese captain Filippino Doria at the Battle of Capo d'Orso. By July 1535, Alfonso served as Imperial lieutenant during the reconquest of the city of Tunis in North Africa. The failure of the third war against France trying to invade Provence, and the death of the first Governor of the Duchy of Milan, Antonio de Leyva, prompted him in 1538 to accept the nomination as governor, replacing Marino Caracciolo, the second governor, becoming some sort of protector of literary and musical people. Alfonso became a Knight in the Order of the Golden Fleece at a chapter in Tournai in 1531. He served as an ambassador for Emperor Charles V, in 1538, on the succession to the new Doge of the Republic of Venice, Pietro Lando.

Alfonso commanded the Imperial army in Italy during the Italian War of 1542 and was defeated by the French at the Battle of Ceresole. However, in the Battle of Serravalle on 2 June 1544, an aftermath of the Italian War of 1542, he managed to defeat a force of freshly raised Italian mercenaries in French service, commanded by Pietro Strozzi and Giovanni Francesco Orsini, count of Pitigliano.

== Personal life ==
On 26 November 1523, Alfonso married Maria d'Aragona, daughter of Duke Ferdinando di Montalto and Catalina Cardona. They had:

- Innico d'Avalos d'Aragona, (1536–1600), cardinal
- Francesco Ferdinando d'Ávalos (1537–1571), commander in chief of the Spanish army in Lombardy and Piedmont
- Antonia d'Avalos (1538–1567), married Gian Giacomo Trivulzio (d.1557), later married Horace de Lannoy
- Cesare d'Avalos (1536–1614), Grand Chancellor of the Kingdom of Naples, married Lucrezia del Tufo, had issue
- Giovanni D'Avalos (1536–1586), founder of the Hermitage of Camaldoli, married Maria Orsini
- Carlo d'Avalos (1541-1612), Grand Chancellor of the Kingdom of Naples, married Sveva Gesualdo, had issue
- Beatrice d'Avalos (1533–1558), married Alfonso de Guevara.

== Sources ==
- Baker-Bates, Piers (2017). Sebastiano Del Piombo and the World of Spanish Rome. Routledge. ISBN 9781351549400.
- Bernstein, Jane A. (2001). Print culture and music in sixteenth-century Venice. Oxford University Press. ISBN 9780195141085.
- Bonora, Elena (2022). Waiting for the Emperor: Italian Princes, the Pope and Charles V. Viella Libreria Editrice. ISBN 9791254690345.
- Garfagnini, Gian Carlo (1983). Firenze e la Toscana dei Medici nell'Europa del '500: Relazioni artictiche. Il linguaggio architettonico. L.S. Olschki.
- Hickson, Sally Anne (2016). Women, Art and Architectural Patronage in Renaissance Mantua: Matrons, Mystics and Monasteries. Routledge. ISBN 9781134777372.
- Oman, Charles (1937). A History of the Art of War in the Sixteenth Century. Methuen & Co.
- Robin, Diana (2007). "d'Aragona, Maria (1502-1568)". In Robin, Diana; Larsen, Anne R.; Levin, Carole (eds.). Encyclopedia of Women in the Renaissance: Italy, France, and England. ABC-CLIO. ISBN 9781851097777.24-26
- Schraven, Minou (2017). Festive Funerals in Early Modern Italy: The Art and Culture of Conspicuous Commemoration. Routledge. ISBN 9781351567060.
- Shaw, Christine (2014). Barons and Castellans: The Military Nobility of Renaissance Italy. Brill. ISBN 9789004282766.
- Waddington, Raymond B. (2009). "Aretino, Titian, and "La Humanita di Cristo"". In Brundin, Abigail; Treherne, Matthew (eds.). Forms of Faith in Sixteenth-century Italy. Ashgate Publishing. pp. 171–198. ISBN 9780754665557.
- Watts, Karen (2025). "The Arms and Armour of Titian's Allegory of Marriage". In Unger, Daniel M. (ed.). Titian's Allegory of Marriage: New Approaches. Taylor & Francis. ISBN 9781040796658.
- Vester, Matthew (2025). Transregional Lordship and the Italian Renaissance: René de Challant, 1504-1565. Routledge. ISBN 9781040782026.

Political offices
Preceded by Cardinal Marino Caracciolo	Governor of the Duchy of Milan; 1538–1546	Succeeded by Ferrante Gonzaga
