= Cesare d'Avalos =

16th-century Italian condottiero

Cesare d'Ávalos
- Born: 16 July 1536; Kingdom of Naples
- Died: 21 August 1614 (aged 78); Kingdom of Naples
- Military career
- Allegiance: Kingdom of Naples; Spanish Empire
- Branch: Navy; Army
- Service years: 1568-1583
- Rank: Captain
- Conflicts: Eighty Years' War; Battle of Jemmingen; Ottoman–Habsburg wars; Battle of Lepanto; Conquest of Tunis; War of the Portuguese Succession
- Awards: Order of Alcántara

Cesare d'Ávalos (16 July 1536 – 21 August 1614), Marquis of Padula, was a Neapolitan nobleman and military man in the service of the Hispanic Monarchy.

== Biography ==
He was the fifth child of Alfonso d'Avalos and Maria d'Aragona. Like his father, he started a military career for the Spanish Empire, now during the reign of Philip II. He was present in the Eighty Years' War, participating in the Battle of Jemmingen under the Duke of Alba.

Three years later he and his brother Carlo were part of the Holy League against the Ottoman Empire, serving under Don John of Austria. Carlo commanded the League's sailing ship squad failed to arrive in time to the Battle of Lepanto, but Cesare did and served with distinction. The following year he was present among the Spanish forces in the conquest of Tunis. He was later in the War of the Portuguese Succession, where Alba and Álvaro de Bazán, also a veteran of Lepanto, defeated the foreign coalition trying to prevent Philip II from inheriting the Portuguese Empire.

He was rewarded by being inducted into the Order of Alcántara, and later became great chancellor of the Kingdom of Naples, one of its seven highest posts. In 1603, he sold Buonabitacolo and Padula to Giovan Gerolamo de Ponte and built the palace later known as the Palace Carafa di Maddaloni. Portraits of him and his brothers Francesco and Giovanni were painted by Bernardino Campi, whom they were patrons of.

== Issue ==
On November 24, 1577 he married Lucrezia del Tufo, daughter of Giovanni Girolamo del Tufo and Antonia Carafa, having two sons: Giovanni, who was appointed Prince of Montesarchio by Philip IV in 1628, and Innico, who inherited the marquisates of Pescara and Vasto after marrying his niece Isabella d'Ávalos.
