= Domini Guardato =

Landowner merchant and intellectual from the Kingdom of Sicily

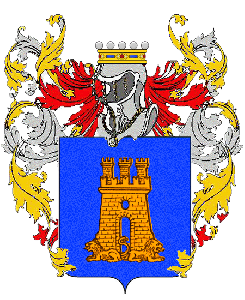

Domini Guardato was a powerful landowner, wealthy merchant, and an intellectual in the Kingdom of Sicily. He was received into the Order of Jerusalem and decorated the Orders of Calatrava and Alcantara. He was a member of the aristocratic Patrician family Guardato, during the late 12th century.

== Biography ==
He was from the medieval merchant city of Sorrento during the Kingdom of Sicily, where his family served as Patricians of the region. Since the time of King William the Good, he distinguished himself ever more to military valor, and therefore was often decorated to high and important office and other noble prerogatives. His descendants enjoyed nobility in the Kingdom of Sicily; Sorrento in the Seat of Door, and in Salerno in the Seat of Field; and many members of his family were received into the Knights Hospitaller; Knights of Alcantara, and the Knights of Calatrava. He more important than nobility, his family enjoyed the status of Patrician of Sorrento unto its abolition, in 1804 was ascribed To register Squares closed the Kingdom.
