= Louis-Charles de Hautefort de Surville =

French nobleman and military officer (1656–1721)

Louis-Charles de Hautefort Marquis de Surville
- Born: 27 June 1656
- Died: 19 December 1721 (aged 65)
- Spouse: Anne-Louis de Crevant d'Humières (m.1686)
- Military career
- Allegiance: Kingdom of France
- Branch: Infantry
- Service years: 1676–1709
- Rank: Lieutenant General
- Commands: Régiment du Roi
- Known for: Siege of Tournai
- Conflicts: Franco-Dutch War; War of the Austrian Succession

Louis-Charles de Hautefort de Surville, Marquis de Surville (27 June 1656 – 19 December 1721) was a French nobleman and military officer, and a favourite of Louis XIV.

== Biography ==
Surville was born in Paris, the eldest son of Gilles de Hautefort, 4th Marquis de Hautefort and Marthe d'Estourmel.

He was a page in the Grande Écurie du Roi (the royal stables at Versailles) of Louis XIV. He served as a volunteer at the siege of Aire-sur-la-Lys in 1676 and the siege of Cambrai in 1677 during the Franco-Dutch War. Surville then accompanied the king during the siege of Ypres and Ghent in 1678. The king appointed him an ensign in the Régiment du Roi and he fought at the Battle of Saint-Denis on 14 August 1678, the last major action of the war.

In 1684 he was appointed lieutenant-colonel of the Toulouse Regiment. On 25 March 1693 he was appointed lieutenant-colonel of the Régiment du Roi, the most prestigious colonelcy in the French Royal Army. On 30 March the same year he was promoted to brigadier. In 1695, the king made Surville a knight of the Order of Saint Louis and on 30 January 1696 he was promoted to maréchal de camp. During the War of the Spanish Succession, he served initially Flanders under Louis, Duke of Burgundy. He was then appointed aide-de-camp to Marsal Tallard. He was present at the Battle of Speyerbach on 15 November 1703, where he distinguished himself, as well as the siege of Landau in 1704. He was created a lieutenant general in 1703. Surville served in the Flanders campaign of 1705 under Louis-François de Boufflers and was injured during the siege of Lille in 1708.

In June 1709, he was given command of French forces during the siege of Tournai. Surville was forced to capitulate to the Duke of Marlborough on 3 September 1709 after a siege lasting two months, during which the defenders ran out of supplies. After the defeat, his favour with the king fell and he was dismissed from service. Surville was forced to melt down his silverware in order to obtain money. He died in Paris on 19 December 1721.

In 1686 he married Anne-Louis de Crevant d'Humières, daughter of Louis de Crevant, Duc de d'Humières. The marriage produced six children.
