= Fernando de Aragón, 1st Duke of Montalto =

Spanish duke

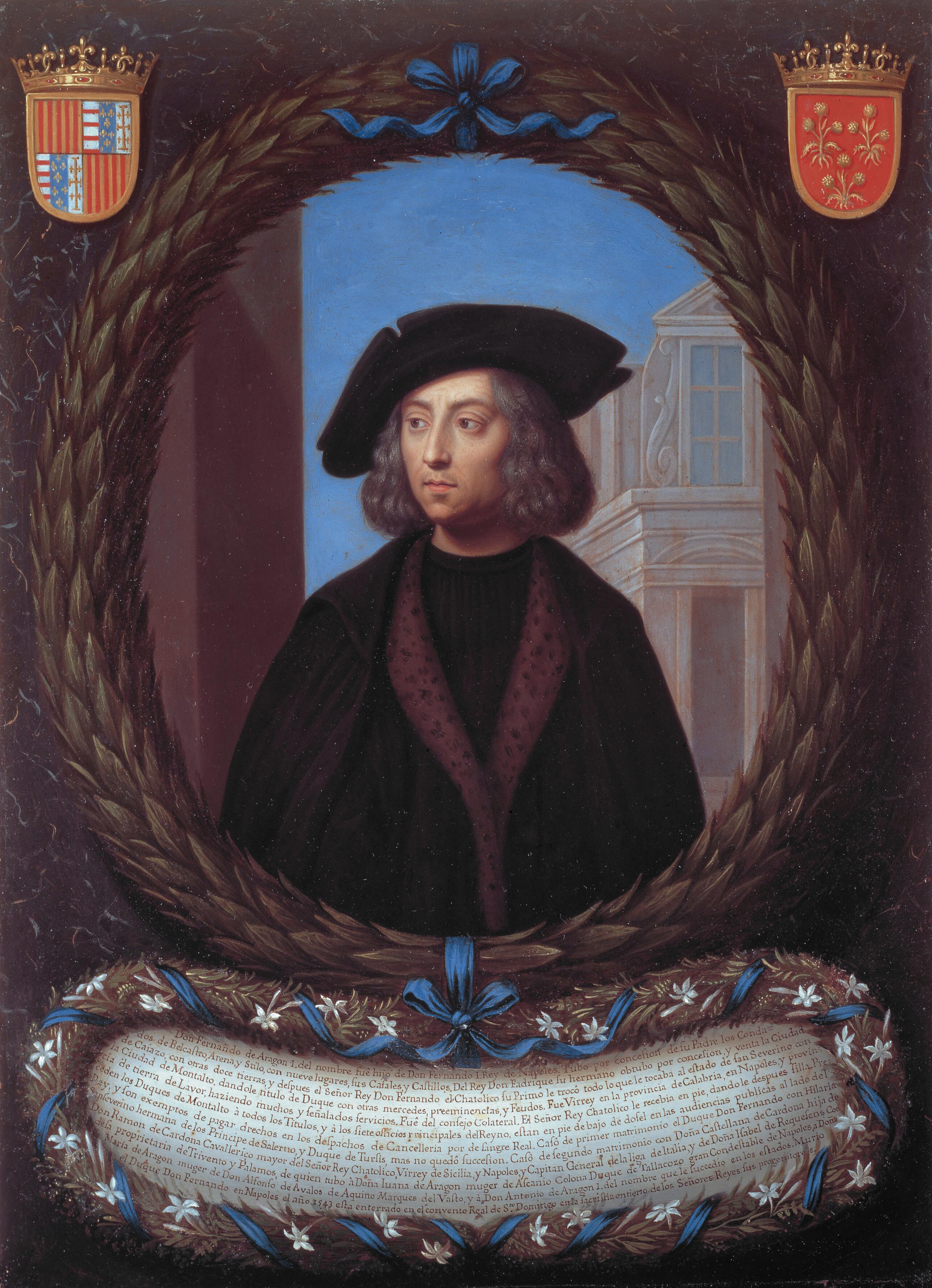
Fernando de Aragón, first Duke of Montalto

Fernando de Aragón y Guardato, 1st Duke of Montalto (before 1494–1542) was the eldest bastard son of king Ferdinand I of Naples and Diana Guardato, one of his mistresses.

The addition "Montalto de Aragón" is in remembrance of his grandfather, Alfonso V of Aragon.

== Marriages and issue ==
Fernando was the ninth child of Ferdinand I of Naples. He first married Anna Sanseverino. The marriage was without issue.

He then married, Castellana de Cardona i de Requesens, daughter of Ramon Folc de Cardona, and had the following:

- Antonio d'Aragona y Cardona?, 2nd Duke of Montalto, (*Naples, Italy, 1499/1506 - +Naples, Italy, 1543); 1st marriage: 1541, Ippolita della Rovere (1525–1561). 2nd marriage: Giulia Antonia de Cardona, Countess di Collisano
  - Pietro d'Aragona y de Cardona, 3rd Duke of Montalto, +after 1543
  - Antonio d'Aragona y de Cardona, 4th Duke of Montalto, (*1543 - +Naples, Italy, 1583); 1st marriage: at Naples, Italy, after 7 February 1562, Maria de la Cerda y Manuel, born 1542; 2nd marriage: Aloisia de Luna, Duchess of Bivona, deceased 1619; kids by 2nd marriage:
    - Maria d'Aragona y de Luna, 5th Duchess of Montalto; she married, 1590, Sicilian Francesco de Moncada y de Luna, 3rd Prince di Paternò, deceased 1595. Issue:
      - The so-called Antonio de Aragón y Moncada, 6th Duke of Montalto (1589–1631), 4th Prince di Paternò, 5th Duke of Bivona, who married Juana de la Cerda y la Cueva, daughter of Juan Luis Francisco de la Cerda y Aragón, 6th Duke of Medinaceli. Notice he used first his mother family name and after his father family name, used sometimes in Spain with much influential and richer females at those times.
    - Bianca Antonia d'Aragona y de Luna
    - Ana Maria d'Aragona y de Luna;(+1677). She married Spanish-Portuguese General Francisco de Moura, 3rd Marquis of Castel Rodrigo, (1610 - 26 November 1675), Duke of Nocera on 10 August 1656, Viceroy of Sardinia, 1657–1661, and Governor of the Habsburg Netherlands, 1664-1668.
  - Isabella d'Aragona y de Cardona, +31 August 1578; she married, 24 May 1565 Juan de la Cerda, 5th Duke of Medinaceli, (1544 - 5th Duke since 1575 - 29 May 1594).
- Giovanna d'Aragona y Cardona?, (*1502 - divorced 1550 - +11 September 1575). She married Ascanio I Colonna, Duke dei Marsi, (1500 - 24 March 1557), brother of famous art and literary woman Vittoria Colonna, (Marino, Italy, April 1490 – Roma, Italy, February 1547) .
- Maria d'Aragona, (*1505, +1568); married Alfonso d'Avalos d'Aquino, Marquess del Vasto e Pescara, (25 May 1502 - + Vigevano, Italy, 31 March 1546).

== Full siblings of Fernando de Aragón y Guardato, 1st Duke of Montalto ==
1. Maria d'Aragona y Guardato, (*1440 - +1460/61); married, 1458 Antonio Todeschini-Piccolomini, Duke of Amalfi, deceased 1493, nephew of Pope Pius II, a.k.a. Enea Silvio Piccolomini,(Corsignano, 1405 - Pope 1458 - Ancona, Italy, 1464).
2. Giovanna d'Aragona y Guardato, (*Naples, 1455 - +Rome, 1501); she married in 1472 Lionardo della Rovere, Duke of Sora (*1445 - +1475)

== Gallery ==
Coat of Arms of the Dukes of Montalto, now known as Dukes of Montalto de Aragón to avoid clashing with a Dukedom of the same name renovated by Spanish people at the ends of the 19th century. This Montalto is a remembrance of Montalto Uffugo, 39° 24′ 0″ N, 16° 9′ 0″ E, Cosenza, Calabria, Italy, formerly in the Hispanic kingdom of Naples.In the center, coat of arms of the Cardona family, by the sides, red and yellow bars of the kingdom of Aragon and Catalonia from his grandfather king Alfonso V of Aragon, (1395 - 1458), king of Sardinia, king of Naples, king of Sicily as well. The five crosses represents their Brienne claim to the Kingdom of Jerusalem. The bluish "fleur de lys" COA with the crennelling represents their descent of the Anjou, a cadet branch of the Capetian kings of France. The red horizontal bands within the silvery background is related to the medieval Kingdom of Hungary

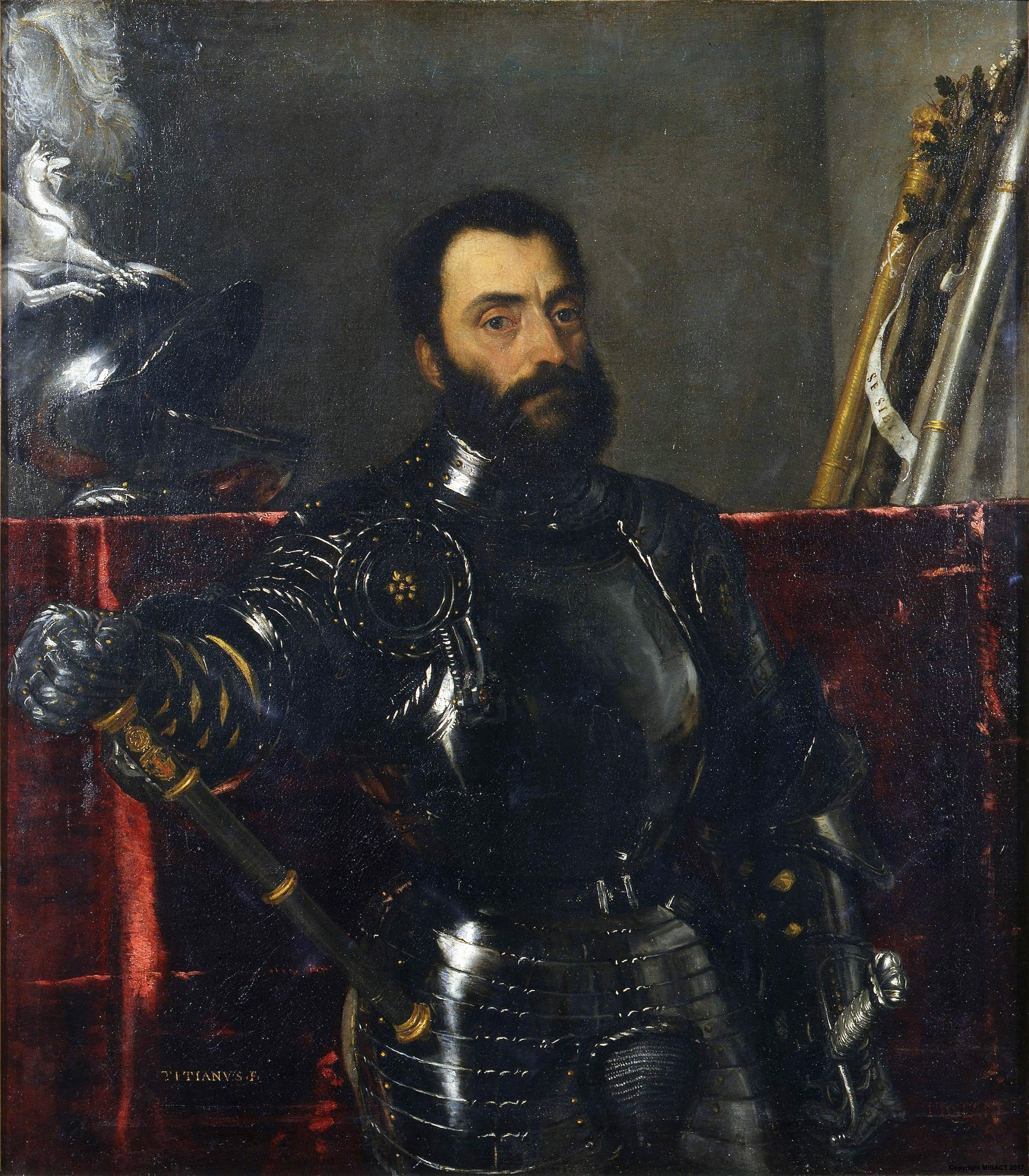
Francesco Maria della Rovere, (1490 - 1538), and sisters were members of the famous family of the Dukes of Urbino on their mother side and related to Popes Sixtus IV and Julius II. Ippolita della Rovere was the wife of Antonio d'Aragona y Cardona, (1499 - 1543), 2nd Duke of Montalto. Painting by Tizian, 114x100 cm. Galleria of the Uffizi, Florence, Italy. Here, Francesco Maria della Rovere is depicted with his wife, Eleanora Gonzaga, born 1493, in a medallion.

Coat of Arms of the family "della Rovere", Princes of Urbino, through their association with the powerful "Montefeltro" Ducal family since 1503 also

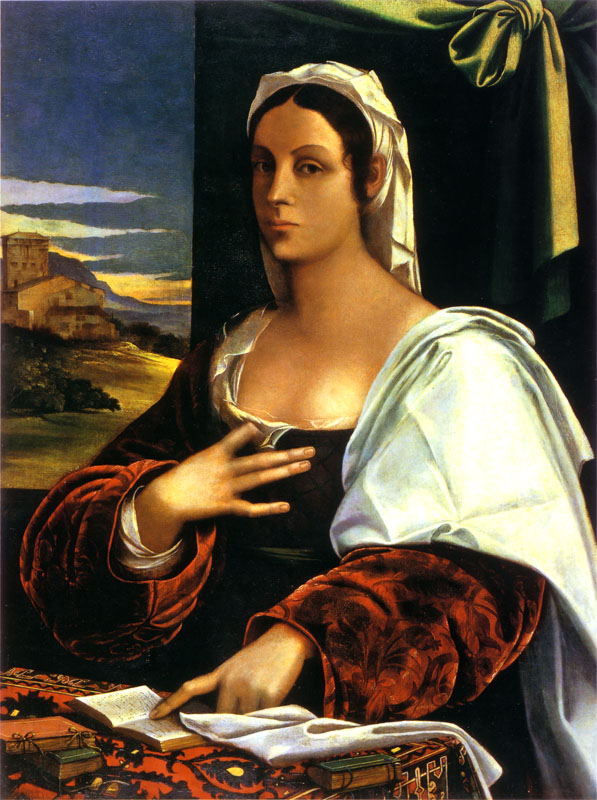
Giovanna d'Aragona y Cardona(1502 - divorced 1550 - 11 September 1575), a daughter of Fernando de Aragón y Guardato, 1st Duke of Montalto was sister in law of famous artistic and literary woman Vittoria Colonna, (1490 - 1547), here depicted, through her marriage to her brother Ascanio I Colonna, Duke dei Marsi, (1500 - 1557). Painting by Sebastiano del Piombo, (1485 - June 1547)

Coat of Arms of Pope Pius II, (1405 - Pope 1458 - 1464), from the "Piccolomini" family of the Dukes of Amalfi, failed strategist of the Crusades calls to counteract the conquest of Constantinople, now Istanbul, by the Turks in 1453. The Imperial marriage alliance between Austrians and naval efficiently Portuguese from the Avis family, did not work satisfactorily
