= Maria d'Aragona =

Neapolitan noblewoman

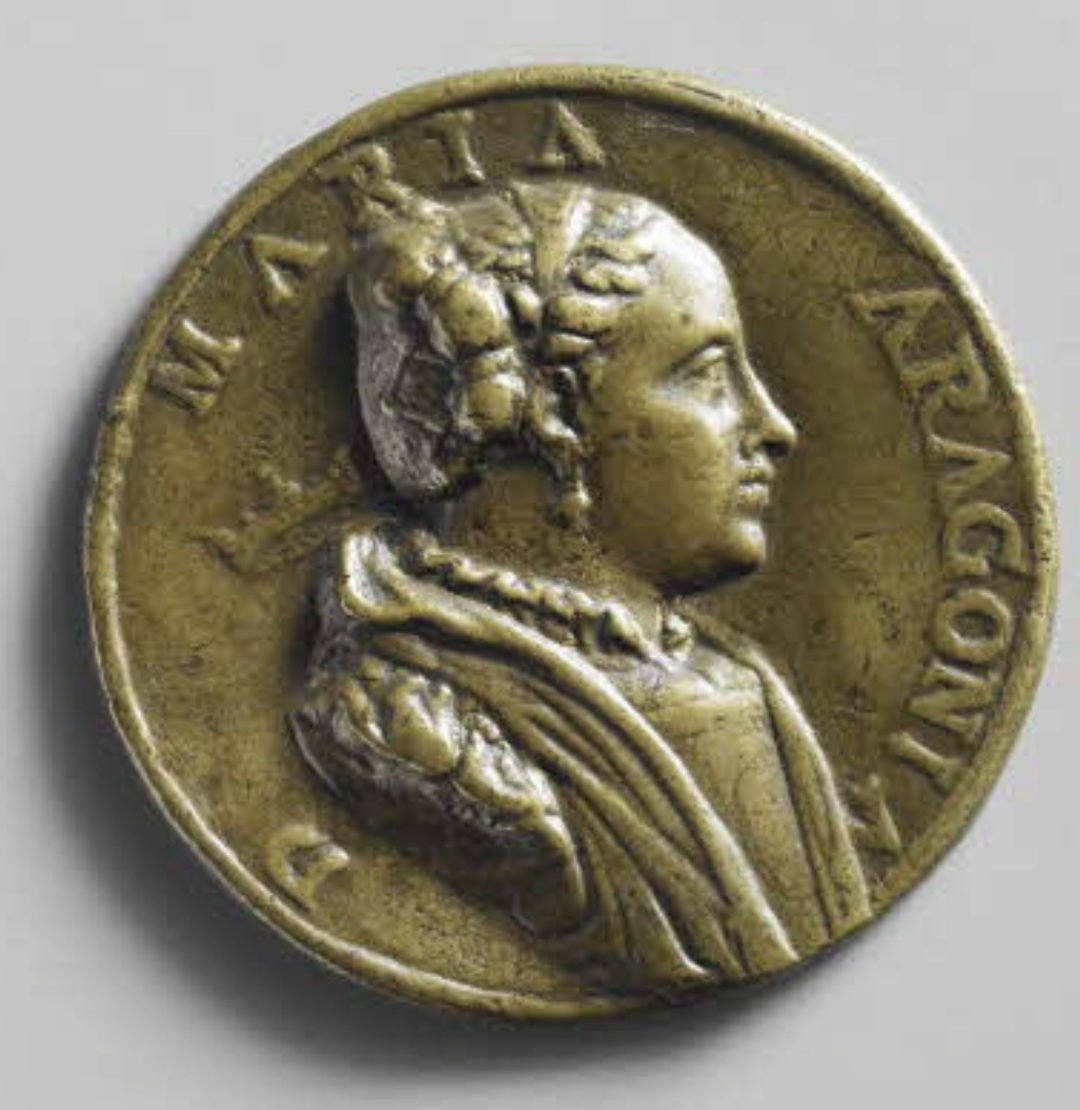
Maria d'Aragona (1503-1568)

Maria d'Aragona (1503–1568; born in d'Avalos Castello in Ischia) was the daughter of Duke Ferdinando di Montalto and Catalina Cardona and the granddaughter of King Ferdinand I of Naples, also called King Ferrante. As a child, Maria d’Aragona grew up in a castle with the poet Vittoria Colonna, who had married d'Avalos's nephew. It was here that Maria met Sannazaro, Tansillo, and Bernardo Tasso who would entertain her in later life at her own salons in Naples, Milan, and Pavia.

== Marriage and family ==
In 1523, Maria d'Aragona married Costanza's grandnephew Marchese Alfonso d'Avalos del Vasto. Del Vasto was a decorated military man in Emperor Charles V’s service. In 1538, Charles V named Del Vasto governor of Milan. The family left Naples for a palace in Milan. Del Vasto had already served under Charles at Pravia, Tunis, and Naples, and there for he was constantly in the field of battle. D’Aragona assumed the responsibility of the court, promoting a cultural program in Milan similar to the one in Naples.

== Political affiliations ==
During the 1530s, Maria, Giovanna d'Aragona, Costanza d'Avalos, Vittoria Colonna, and Giulia Gonzaga became disciples of the theologian Juan de Valdés. The group attended his lectures / discussions of scriptures at Juan’s house in Chiaia. The group attended sermons of Bernardino Ochino, a radical reform preacher. After Charles V promoted Del Vasto to Governor, Maria remained loyal to Valdés’s disciple, Pietro Carnesecchi, and she continued to correspond to Cardinal Seripando, who was under attack by Inquisitors in Rome. In 1540 d’Aragona attempted to bring Ochino to Milan. However, Ochino fled Italy to protest in Geneva one year later.

== Arts ==
Maria produced a salon in which many poets inhabited. They included Paolo Giovio, Girolamo Muzio, Pietro Aretino, Giulio Camillo and Bernardo Spina, who had taken part in Costanza’s circle. Luca Contile chronicled the life of Maria’s husband and her sister in his Lettere, which was later published in Venice.

== Downfall and rise ==
In 1544, Del Vasto lost twelve thousand men while fighting the French at Ceresole. He was a broken man who had never recovered from his wounds. He died in 1546. After her husband's death, Maria moved her entourage out of the palace in Milan to resettle with her seven children and her sister Giovanna in Pavia. There she reestablished her salon and integrated the literary academy Chiave d’Oro with Contile, Aretino and others from her circle in Milan. In 1547 they boarded a ship and proceeded to return to Ischia and reestablish their salon at Castel dell’Ovo in Naples.

== Rebellion ==
On May 13, 1547, the Viceroy of Naples, Pedro Álvarez de Toledo, turned against his people, closed the city’s literary academics, and imprisoned their leaders, Ferrante, Carafa and Angelo di Costanzo. Driven out of Naples, d’Aragona collaborated with writers well connected to the Venetian editors and printers; established works honoring her and her sister for standing behind Naples literary establishment in the face of threats from the Inquisition and book burnings.

== Aftermath ==
In 1551, the Academy of the Dubbiosi in Venice launched plans for a work entitled “The Temple of the Divine Lady Giovanna d’Aragona”. One year later, editor Girolamo Ruscelli published a tribute to Maria d’Aragona under the title “A lecture … on a sonnet in honor of the divine lady the Marchese del Vasto”. The Venetian editor Lodovico Dolce announced the publication of the first of four anthologies featuring Napoleonic writers who had participated in Maria d’ Aragona’s circle. The Poems by Maria’s husband led off the first and second editions of the text, Rime di diversi napoletani. Maria returned to Naples and died in 1568. Venetian editors praised her brilliance and beauty.

She is buried in the church of San Domenico Maggiore, Naples. Between 1984 and 1987, her coffin was opened and her mummified remains were scientifically studied by pathologists. Here body showed signs of syphilis and anogenital warts, which both are sexually transmitted infections. Treponema pallidum, the bacterium that causes syphilis, was isolated in a syphilitic gumma on her left arm, and human papilloma virus (HPV type 18), a common cause of genital warts and of vulvar and cervical cancer, was isolated from a papilloma in her right groin. The swelling of her left leg could correspond with edema from lymphogenic metastases from metastatic vulvar cancer, which may have been the leading cause of her death.
