= Fonte della Noce =

Fountain in Teramo, Italy

- Sculpture
- {{{other_names}}}
- Fonte della Noce
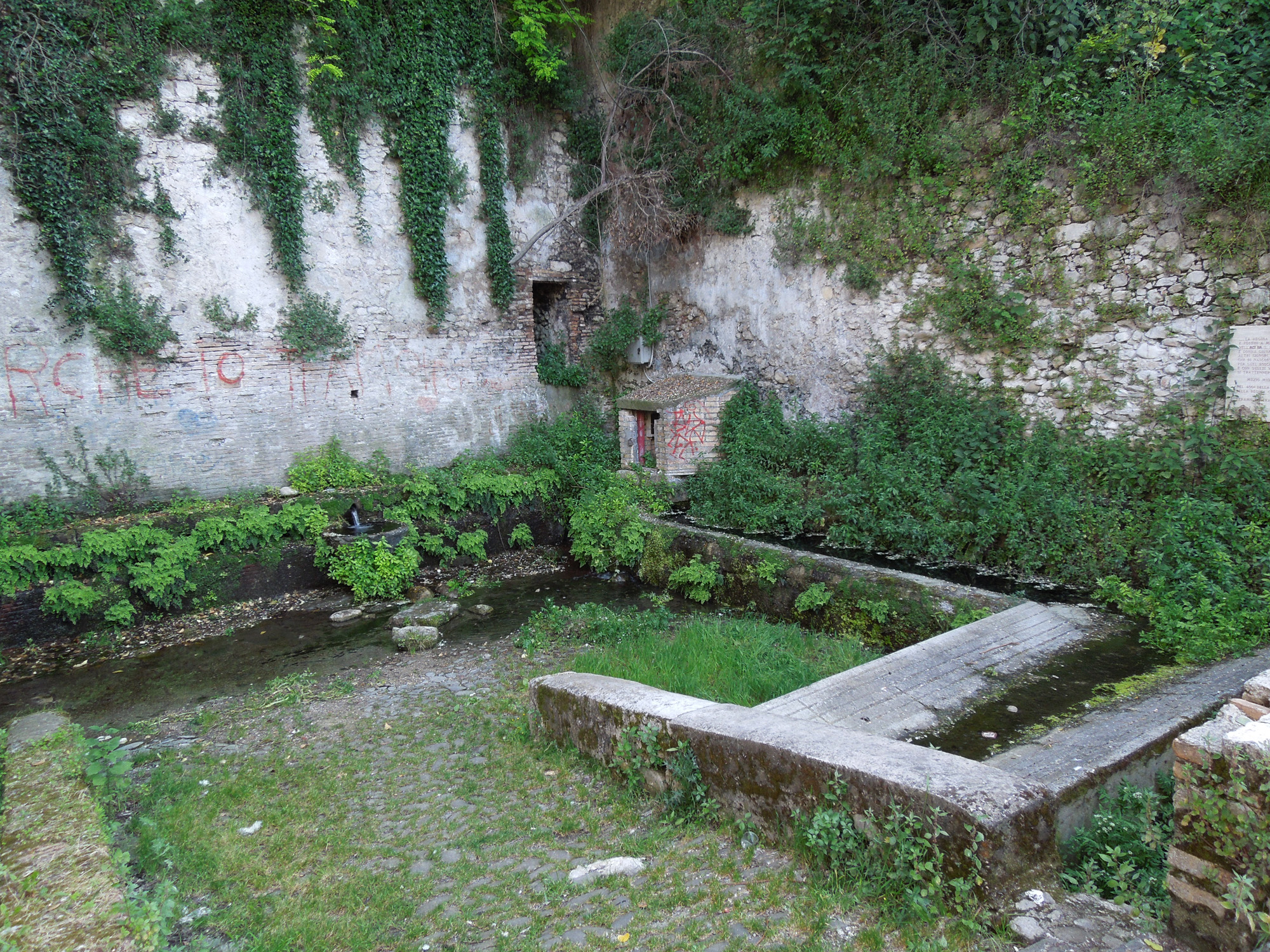
- Design: Unknown
- Constructed: XIII century
- Surface: Travertine stone, bricks and stone
- Location: Teramo, Italy
- Click on the map for a fullscreen view
- Coordinates: 42°39′33.04″N 13°42′35.17″E

Fonte Della Noce is a historic fountain in the city of Teramo in Abruzzo. The site hosting it is located in via Fonte Della Noce. Inside of the natural area of Vezzola River Park. Near the city centre.

== History ==
The fountain system was built in medieval times and was destinated for the distribution of drinking water. Over time, until the 1930s of the interwar period, it helped to satisfy the water needs of the north area of the city, when running water had not yet been conducted inside the houses. It was also used as a public wash house and watering hole.

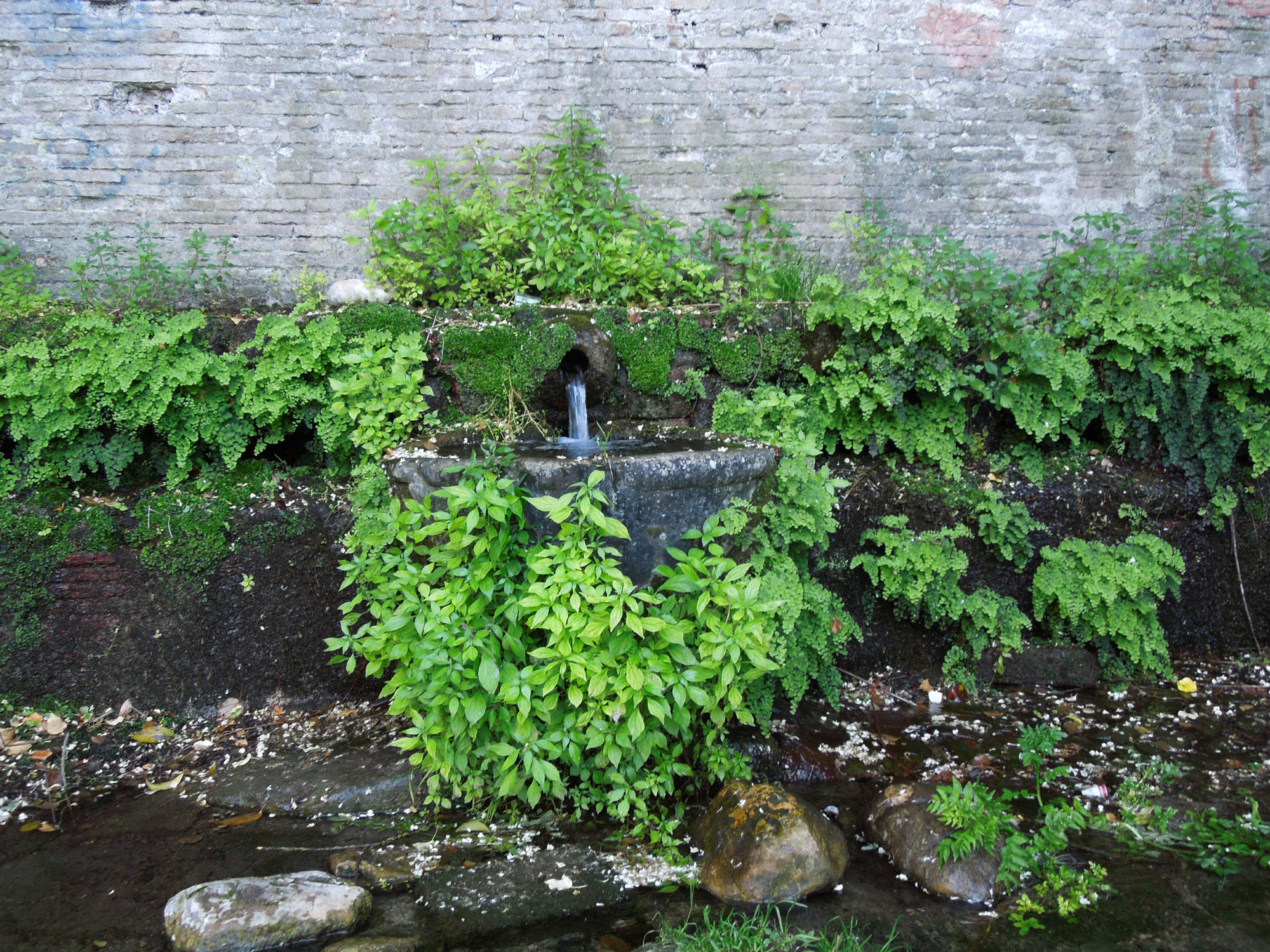
Circular basin, placed on the back wall of the source

The source takes the name of ″Della Noce″ due to the presence of the innumerable walnut trees in its vicinity which, with their shrubs and foliage, characterize the surrounding environment.

There is news of a restoration work of the source, to ensure its conservation, in the Civil Annals of the Kingdom of the Two Sicilies of the year 1835.

=== Joan of Aragon's visit to the fountain ===
The place is also known and remembered in Teramo historical events as it was visited by Queen Giovanna of Trastámara, better known as Giovanna of Aragon, princess crown of Aragon and queen consort, later widow, of King Ferdinand I of Naples The sovereign, in the month of July of the year 1514, spent five days in the city of Teramo to acquire possession of her.

The historian Mutio dè Muzji has narrated, in great detail, all the events of the stay of the ruler and her court, including the visit to the Fonte Della Noce. As reported by Muzji, Joan of Aragon was particularly impressed by these clear and fresh waters, and ordered a dinner banquet to be set up, enlivened by musicians and dancers, to be consumed near the fountain «The Queen stayed in this city for the space of five days, where she had great pleasure and satisfaction, having visited all the churches and relics that are in it, and having also wanted to go and see Acquaviva a place of much amusement in this city due to the many herbage and clear waters that are there, which the queen and all those lords who accompanied her had great pleasure, the city also gave her a dinner at the source of the Noce which received an admirable taste».Mutio dè Muzji, History of the city of Teramo, 1588

The historian Niccola Palma, taking up the words of Mutji, also handed down the details of the set-up for the banquet wanted by the Queen of Aragon on the second day of her presence in Teramo. To accommodate the banquet of the sovereign, the Lords of the Regiment arranged around the source two groves of plants and intertwined branches of poplars that shaded and made the space more pleasant. A grove was placed between the fountain and the city walls, while the other was located further to the right of the perimeter. In the two trees, thus rebuilt, the musicians and 12 dancers hid, dressed « in the Moorish», who entertained the diners with various outings. Furthermore, two artificial sources were formed, one in which water flowed copiously and in the second red wine. Joanna of Aragon had a separate table, compared to the rest of the courtiers of her retinue, where she dined with her daughter. The royal party remained at the source until nightfall

In memory of this event, a plaque bearing the words of Muzji's description carved on it was placed on the occasion of the four hundredth year since the visit of the sovereign.

== Architecture ==
Fonte della Noce has its simple and essential architectural lines on a large and airy rectangular area delimited by three high masonry walls, erected with stones and bricks, arranged in a " C " shape. The fourth side is surrounded by a low wall with an opening that allows access.

Its structure, mainly built in stone, is made up of two drinking troughs, a wash house and a circular basin decorated with a ribbed band that draws water from a simple, small rose window.
