= Catherine of Guelders =

Regent of the Duchy of Guelders from 1477 to1492

Egmond coat of arms

Catherine of Guelders (ca. 1440 – Guelders, January 25, 1497), was regent of the Duchy of Guelders between 1477 and 1492. First for her brother during his absence, and then for her young nephew.

== Family ==
Catherine of Guelders was the fourth and youngest child of Arnold, Duke of Guelders (1410–1473) and Catherine of Cleves (1417–1479). Through her mother she was a granddaughter of Adolph I, Duke of Cleves and Mary of Burgundy.

Her mother Catherine of Cleves owned the Hours of Catherine of Cleves, one of the most highly decorated book of hours to survive from the 15th century.

== Early ==
Until 1477, Cather led an inconspicuous life as the youngest sibling of her brother Adolf, Duke of Guelders, at war with their father, and her sisters Mary of Guelders, married to King James II of Scotland, and Margaret of Guelders, married to Frederick I, Count Palatine of Simmern.

Despite efforts by her father, no suitable husband was found for Catherine. 17th century theories that she was secretly married with Louis de Bourbon, Bishop of Liège, are now believed to be false.

== Regency ==
Everything changed for Catherine in 1477, when Charles the Bold was killed in the Battle of Nancy while fighting for Mary of Burgundy. Guelders had been under control of Charles the Bold since 1473, and now saw the chance to regain its independence. As her brother Adolf was in Flanders, the States of Guelders convinced him to appoint his sister Catherine as regent, pending his return. Catherine agreed and was appointed regent in 1477.

The regency lasted much longer than expected, because Adolf was killed in battle on June 27, 1477. She continued to rule as regent for his son Charles II, Duke of Guelders, who was held with his sister Philippa of Guelders by the Burgundians.

Catherine became involved in the Guelderian War of Independence with Maximilian of Austria. In 1482, she was forced to conclude peace with Maximilian and to retire from politics.

In 1492, she witnessed the regained independence of Guelders under her nephew Charles II, Duke of Guelders.

== Death ==
Catherine died in 1497. She was buried in the parish church of St. Mary Magdelen, Geldern, where her grave and engraved brass memorial can still be seen.
