= Treaty of Westminster (1462) =

Treaty between England and the Lord of the Isles

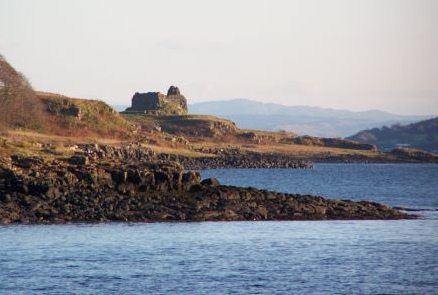
The Scottish lords agreed to join with Edward IV of England at Ardtornish Castle

The Treaty of Westminster (or the Treaty of Westminster-Ardtornish) was signed on 13 February 1462 between Edward IV of England of the House of York and the Scottish John of Islay, Earl of Ross, Lord of the Isles. The agreement proposed that if Scotland was conquered by England, the lands north of the Scottish sea (the Firth of Forth) would be divided between the Lord of the Isles and the Earl of Douglas to be held from the crown of England, while the Earl of Douglas would hold Scotland south of the Firth.

== Background ==
The Scottish crown in the minority of James III of Scotland had taken the Lancastrian side in the Wars of the Roses by welcoming the fugitive Henry VI of England. Edward IV was forming new alliances with disaffected English and Scottish nobles to reduce the threat posed by the exiled former king, now in the hands of James III's mother Mary of Guelders.

== Process ==
The Earl of Douglas and his brother John Douglas of Balvenie made their way to the west of Scotland with Edward IV's proposals. The highland lords gave their assent from Ardtornish Castle on 19 October 1461, and sent Ranald of the Isles and Duncan, Archdeacon of the Isles, as their envoys to London. The articles were finalised and sealed at Westminster Palace on 13 February 1462 and signed by Edward IV on 17 March 1462. John, Earl of Ross, Donald Balagh, and his son and heir John, with all the people of Ross and the Isles would become subjects of Edward IV on Whitsunday.

== Consequences ==
The historian Norman Macdougall thought that the significance of the agreement was overplayed by earlier historians, such as Andrew Lang, who described it as an attempt to "stab Scotland in the back with a Celtic dirk." Its consequence was an attack by the Earl of Ross on crown lands near Inverness in 1462 and 1463.

The Scottish crown allied with Edward IV by the treaty of York in 1464. In 1475, the English court revealed the existence of the 1462 agreement; John, the Earl of Ross, was consequently summoned for treason – including the acts of making leagues and bands with Edward IV and the banished Earl of Douglas. John was only able to calm matters by quitclaiming Ross (which at that time included Skye). In 1491, in an attempt to get it back, his half-nephew launched the Raid on Ross, which the Scottish king was then able to use as justification for abolishing the powerful Lordship of the Isles itself.

== The Douglases and England ==
It is notable that Archibald Douglas, 5th Earl of Angus was to play a significant role in the future Treaty of Perpetual Peace and its offspring, the Treaty of Greenwich. The Douglases were generally, at that time, the heads of the pro-English party in Scotland, pushing for what eventually became a Union of the Crowns and Kingdom of Great Britain.

== See also ==
- List of treaties
