= Margaret of Guelders (1436–1486) =

Noblewoman in present-day Netherlands

Egmond coat of arms

Margaret of Guelders (11 August 1436, Grave, North Brabant – 2 November 1486, Simmern) was a noblewoman from what is now the Netherlands. She was part of the Egmond Family. She was married to the Count Palatine of Simmern and was the Countess of Palatinate-Simmern.

== Life ==
Margaret was born on 11 August 1436. She was the daughter of Arnold of Egmond, Duke of Guelders, and Catherine of Cleves (1417–1479). Her siblings were Mary of Guelders, Queen of Scotland, Catherine of Guelders who became regent for her nephew, and Adolf, Duke of Guelders who fought against their father.

Through her mother she was a granddaughter of Adolph I, Duke of Cleves and Mary of Burgundy making her a great-niece of Philip the Good, Duke of Burgundy. Her mother Catherine of Cleves owned the Hours of Catherine of Cleves, one of the most highly decorated book of hours to survive from the 15th century.

In Lobith, Gelderland, on 6 August 1454 she married Frederick I, Count Palatine of Simmern making her Countess of Palatinate-Simmern. They had ten children:

1. Katherine (1455 – 28 December 1522)
2. Stephen (25 February 1457 – 1488/9)
3. William (2 January 1458 – 1458)
4. John I (15 May 1459 – 27 January 1509)
5. Frederick (10 April 1460 – 22 November 1518)
6. Rupert (16 October 1461 – 19 April 1507)
7. Anne (30 July 1465 – 15 July 1517)
8. Margaret (2 December 1466 – August 1506)
9. Helene (1467 – 21 February 1555)
10. William (20 April 1468 – 1481)

== Death ==
She died on 2 November 1486 at Simmern unter Dhaun, Bad Kreuznach, Rhineland-Palatinate, Germany, and she was buried at Kloster Ravengiersburg a monastery in the now Germany where her husband too was buried. She lived long enough to see her son, John I, marry Joanna of Nassau-Saarbrücken the daughter of Johann II of Nassau-Saarbrücken in 1481.
