= Margaret Stewart (born c. 1455) =

Younger daughter of James II of Scotland and Mary of Guelders

- Born: c. 1455/1456
- Died: c. 1480/1500?
- Spouse: William Crichton, '3rd Lord Crichton'
- Issue: Margaret Crichton; Sir James Crichton
- House: Stewart
- Father: James II of Scotland
- Mother: Mary of Guelders

See also Margaret Stewart.

Margaret Stewart (c. 1455/1456 – c. 1480/1500?) was the younger daughter of James II of Scotland and Mary of Guelders. Once engaged to the Lancastrian Prince of Wales, Margaret became the wife of William Crichton, 3rd Lord Crichton (an enemy of her brother, James III), and the mother of his daughter, Margaret Crichton, later Countess of Rothes, and his son, Sir James Crichton, progenitor of the Viscounts of Frendraught.

== Family ==
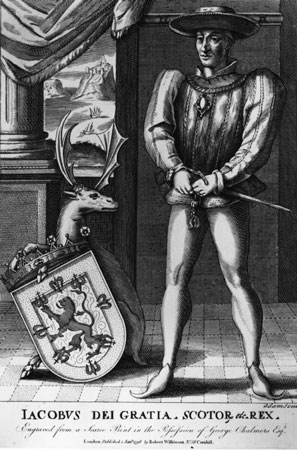
Her father, James II

Margaret was born between 1453 and 1460, the daughter of James II of Scotland and Mary of Guelders. She had five siblings, including James III, who ascended the Scottish throne in 1460 upon their father's accidental death by an exploding cannon.

Margaret's nurse was Marion Darrauch, who was paid £5 in 1462. In 1462 Margaret lived at Falkland Palace, and in 1463 joined her brother, the Earl of Mar, and sister Mary at Stirling Castle. In 1464 she was sent to be educated at the Cistercian Priory at Haddington, where Alison Maitland was her governess until she left in 1477. During these years, she came to the opening of Parliament and the betrothal of her nephew, Prince James. Clothes were made for her, including gowns edged with velvet and red satin kirtles.

Margaret's mother died in 1463, leaving her an orphan at probably less than ten years old.

== Marriage proposals ==
During the Wars of the Roses, Margaret was briefly engaged to Edward of Westminster, Prince of Wales, the only son of Henry VI of England and Margaret of Anjou. However, the engagement was called off by her mother due to political pressure from Edward IV of England and Philip III, Duke of Burgundy. Thoughts of an English match did not go away, and Margaret's brother James III was particularly keen to achieve one. In 1476, she was therefore proposed by James III to George Plantagenet, 1st Duke of Clarence, and she was afterward to have been married to Anthony Woodville, 2nd Earl Rivers, brother-in-law of Edward IV; but neither of these alliances took place.

== Later life ==
Wife of William Crichton, 3rd Lord Crichton of Auchingoul (grandson of Lord Chancellor Crichton) Their daughter, also named Margaret, was born between 1478 and 1485, raised in the royal court.

A dress was bought for "Lady Margaret's daughter" in 1496.

Margaret, the daughter of William Crichton and Margaret Stewart, daughter of King James II, of Scotland, married John Robertson, son of Alexander Robertson, '5th Baron of Strowan' and his second wife, Isabel Stewart, daughter of John Stewart, "Earl of Athole'; she married William Todrick, an Edinburgh merchant, and after his death in 1507, an Edinburgh merchant George Halkerston, and thirdly, George Leslie, 4th Earl of Rothes.

Margaret had a son also, James Crichton, who married Catherine Borthwick, the eldest daughter of William, Lord Borthwick.

Lord Crichton joined Margaret's brother Alexander Stewart, Duke of Albany, in his rebellion against Margaret's eldest brother, the unpopular King James III. On behalf of the duke, Lord Crichton garrisoned his "very ancient and magnificent" castle of Crichton, for which his lands and titles were forfeited by the Parliament of Scotland in 1484, when Albany was sentenced for treason. His castle was granted to a minion of James III, Sir John Ramsay of Balmain.

According to historian George Buchanan (who was "always hostile" to the Stewarts), Margaret had an incestuous relationship with her brother the king. However, James III's most recent biographer, Norman MacDougall, has firmly rejected this on the grounds that the rumour seems only to have come about as a direct result of the political tensions of James' reign and of his descendant Mary, Queen of Scots, in an attempt to blacken the reputation of both James III and the Stewart dynasty (for comparison, see the rumours that James had poisoned his wife, Margaret of Denmark). Though there are few contemporary references to her, later writers were unsympathetic in their descriptions of the princess, in particular peerage writers of the nineteenth century. John Riddell called her "a person, although young and beautiful, of depraved character, being even charged with too much familiarity with her own brother." Balfour-Paul agreed, stating that Margaret was "a Princess of great beauty, but of a reputation that was more than loose."

Sir Walter Scott wrote:

[After garrisoning his castle and fleeing to England,] William, the hereditary Lord of Crichton, pined in exile, from which he is said to have been recalled under the following circumstances: The Lady of Crichton, says Buchanan, died soon after her husband's flight to England; and the king, desirous to hide the disgrace of his favourite sister, who was almost frantic for the loss of her paramour, recalled Crichton from banishment, on condition of his marrying the Princess Margaret. They were wedded accordingly, and Crichton seems to have obtained restitution of that part of his fortune which descended to him by his mother, the Barony of Frendraught, namely, in the North, which from this time became his residence, and that of his successors. Crichton was reconciled to the king, and admitted to his presence at Inverness, during an expedition which James made towards the North near the conclusion of his reign. He therefore entertained hopes of obtaining a full pardon, but neither of the brothers-in-law long survived the interview. Crichton died at Inverness, where, according to Buchanan, his monument was extant in the time of the historian. It seems uncertain whether the son who survived William Lord Crichton was the child of the Princess Margaret; but he left a daughter, their undoubted issue, who became Countess of Rothes.

If Scott's account is accurate, Margaret, then Lady Crichton, may have spent the rest of her life at Crichton's residence "in the North", at the Barony of Frendraught. However, it is known that Margaret became a resident of Elcho Priory near Perth in 1489 and remained there for some years during the reign of her nephew, James IV (r. 1488–1513), whose account books show frequent disbursements for "supplies for the Lady Margaret," one, in particular, for "a new dress for the ladye in Elquo."

== Descendants ==
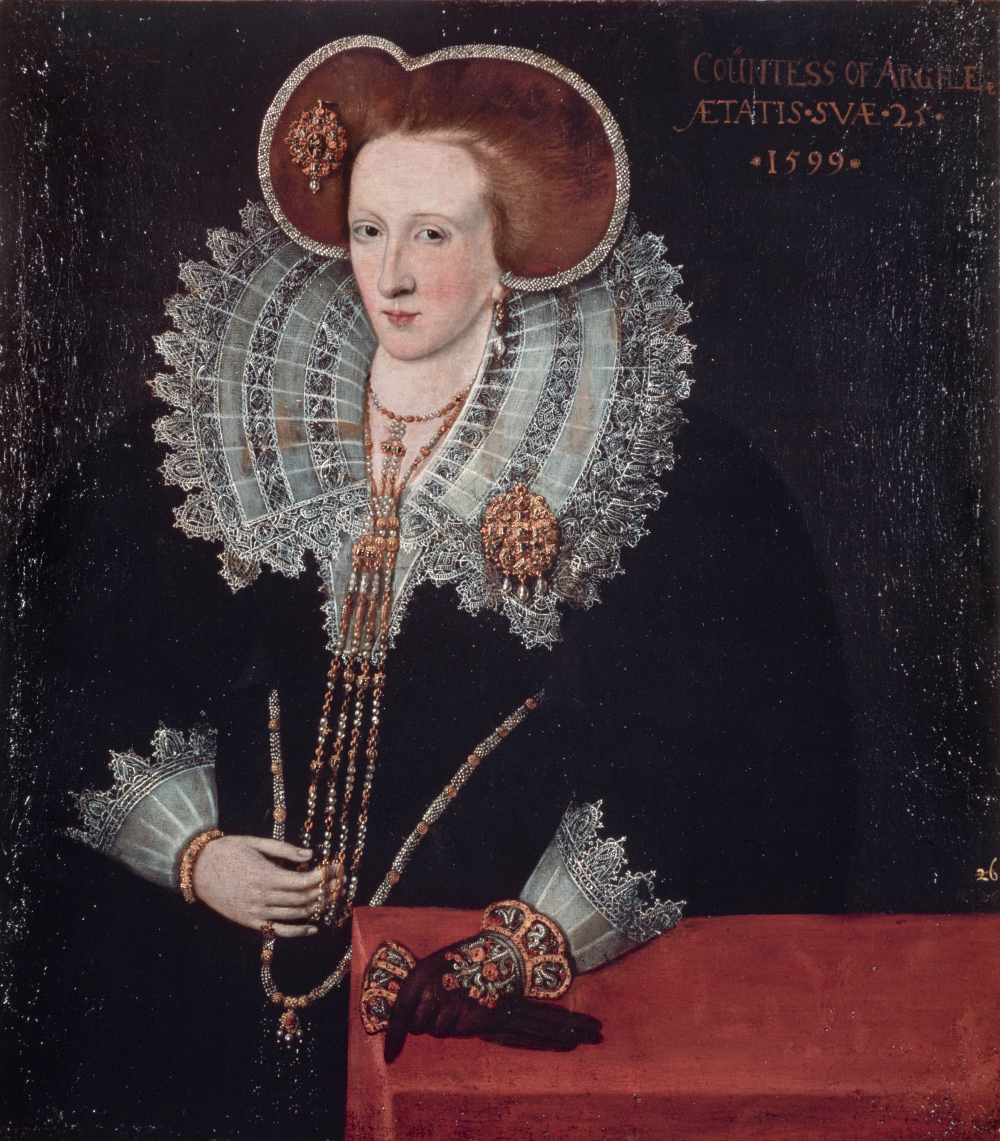
Her great-granddaughter, the beauty Lady Agnes Douglas, in 1599

Margaret's daughter, Margaret Crichton, had four daughters by her third husband, George Leslie, 4th Earl of Rothes, Ambassador to Denmark (whom she married twice), including Helen Leslie, Lady Newbattle, and two sons, William Rothes and Norman Leslie, Master of Rothes, whose rights of inheritance were forfeited as a result of both having been implicated in the murder of Cardinal Beaton in 1546. Their father, the 4th Earl of Rothes, was tried and acquitted of the same crime. However, the mother of these children might have been a different wife of Rothes. The son of their second marriage, Robert Leslie of Ardersier, received the estate of Findrassie. He married Janet, daughter of the 2nd Lord Elphinstone, and founded the line of Findrassie, of which daughters of both the second and third lairds – both also named Robert – married Gordon of Embo baronets.

== Ancestry ==
Ancestors of Margaret Stewart (born c. 1455)

16. Robert II of Scotland
8. Robert III of Scotland
17. Elizabeth Mure
4. James I of Scotland
18. John Drummond of Concraig
9. Annabella Drummond
19. Mary Montifex
2. James II of Scotland
20. John of Gaunt, 1st Duke of Lancaster
10. John Beaufort, 1st Earl of Somerset
21. Katherine Swynford
5. Joan Beaufort
22. Thomas Holland, 2nd Earl of Kent
11. Margaret Holland
23. Alice Fitzalan
1. Margaret Stewart
24. Arnold I, Lord of Egmond
12. John II, Count of Egmond
25. Jolanthe of Leiningen
6. Arnold, Duke of Guelders
26. John V, Lord of Arkel
13. Maria van Arkel
27. Joanna of Jülich
3. Mary of Guelders
28. Adolf III of the Marck
14. Adolph I, Duke of Cleves
29. Margaret of Jülich
7. Catherine of Cleves (1417–1479)
30. John the Fearless
15. Mary of Burgundy, Duchess of Cleves
31. Margaret of Bavaria

== Sources ==
- Burke, Bernard (1866), A Genealogical History of the Dormant, Abeyant, Forfeited, and Extinct Peerages of the British Empire: Harrison.
- Lang, Andrew (1903), A History of Scotland from the Roman Occupation, Volume 1: Dodd, Mead and Co.
- Paul, James Balfour (1906), The Scots Peerage: Founded on Wood's Edition of Sir Robert Douglas's Peerage of Scotland; Containing an Historical and Genealogical Account of the Nobility of that Kingdom: D. Douglas.
- Riddell, John (1833), Remarks upon Scotch peerage law...: T. Clark.
- Scott, Walter. "Crichton Castle." Miscellaneous Prose Works of Sir Walter Scott. Vol. 2. Edinburgh: R. Cadell, 1834. 87–88. Google Books. Web. 2 May 2010.
- Alison Weir: Lancaster and York: War of the Roses, London (1995) ISBN 978-0-09-954017-5
- The History and Martial Atchievements of the Robertson's of Strowan. As it is Selected from the works of the best historians, that have writen of the Origin and valiant Atchievements of ths Honourable family, and their descendants, And the Poems. On Various Subjects and Occasions, by the Honourable Alexander Robertson, of Strowan, Esq. Hor. L. 3. Odo 3
- “Justum et tenacem propositi virum” is a Latin phrase from Horace’s Odes (Book III, Ode 3.1) meaning “a man of firm and noble soul” poems.mahoodles.com+1. It is the opening line of a short ode by George Gordon, Lord Byron, which translates and expands this Horatian image into a vivid portrait of unwavering resolve.
- “not by the rage of the crowd clamoring for wrong,” and it is part of a verse praising the steadfastness of a just and resolute man
- “non vultus instantis tyranni”
- Mente quaitt solida
