= Capture of Roxburgh =

Capture of Roxburgh may refer to:

- Capture of Roxburgh (1314)
- Capture of Roxburgh (1460)
