= Seventy Years War =

The Seventy Years War is a historiographical concept used by historians, notably Hamish Scott and Anthony Page, to frame the period of intense and continuous rivalry and conflict between Great Britain and France lasting from 1744 until 1815.

This concept argues for viewing the succession of major wars, proxy conflicts, and crises spanning these seven decades—from the formal start of the Anglo-French conflict within the War of the Austrian Succession to the Battle of Waterloo—as a single, overarching struggle for national survival and European dominance. The central thesis is that Britain's actions during this period were primarily driven by a defensive necessity to prevent French domination of Europe, rather than inevitable, confident imperialism.

== Nomenclature and Context ==
The term "Seventy Years War" is proposed as a more precise chronological framework than the commonly used "Second Hundred Years' War" (1689–1815). The "Second Hundred Years' War" spans 125 years and includes a significant quarter-century of peace following the Treaty of Utrecht in 1713, during which Britain and France were even allies (1716–1731).

The "Seventy Years War" period (1744–1815) is characterized by remarkably continuous hostility; Britain and France were at war or skirmishing in 49 of the 71 years between 1744 and 1815, representing approximately 70% of the period. Historian Hamish Scott suggested the term due to how "continuous was the rivalry during these decades and so extensive and frequent the periods of open warfare."

== Constituent Conflicts ==
The Seventy Years War encompasses a series of global and European conflicts in which Britain and France were the main antagonists:

- War of the Austrian Succession (1744–1748) Formal Anglo-French war began in 1744, merging with the wider conflict that started in 1740. Began for Britain with the War of Jenkins' Ear (1739) against Spain.
- Seven Years' War (1756–1763) Dubbed the 'first world war,' it included the French and Indian War in North America, resulting in Britain gaining Canada and Bengal.
- American War of Independence (1778–1783) The conflict, sparked by the taxation of North American colonies, transformed into a global war when France joined the American side in 1778.
- French Revolutionary Wars (1793–1802) Followed the French Revolution and the execution of Louis XVI, marked by the rise of republican France in 1792.
- Napoleonic Wars (1803–1815) Saw the rise and ultimate defeat of Napoleon, ending with his defeat at Waterloo.

Between these major wars, periods of "cold war" were marked by constant Anglo-French clashes in North America and India, as well as several crises that nearly triggered renewed conflict, such as the Falkland Islands crisis of 1771 and the Dutch Revolt of 1787.

== Threat of Invasion and British Strategy ==
Throughout the entire seventy-year period, Britain, whose population was only about a third the size of France's, was in frequent fear of invasion. French invasion threats to Britain and Ireland occurred repeatedly (including 1744–46, 1759, 1779, 1796–1805, and 1811). These threats were existential, carrying the potential for political revolution, such as the replacement of the Hanoverian monarchy with a Catholic Stuart claimant in the 1740s, or the rise of republicanism in the 1790s.

British strategic priority was therefore not global conquest, but the preservation of the balance of power in Europe to contain France. This defensive necessity led to a strategic focus on:

1) The Royal Navy: The English Channel was not considered a secure moat. The Royal Navy, dubbed the "Wooden Walls of England," was essential for survival. The overwhelming bulk of the navy, including the crucial Western Squadron (established 1747) to patrol the Channel approaches, was stationed in home waters.

2) Maintaining European Allies: Britain consistently invested in European alliances, subsidizing allies and deploying the professionalizing British Army to the Continent.

3) Colonies as By-products: Global empire was primarily a by-product of the defensive war. While merchants lobbied for a "blue water" policy focused on colonies, statesmen prioritized the European threat. Colonies were often acquired opportunistically by distant naval squadrons. The one period where Britain disengaged from Europe to focus on overseas empire (early reign of George III) resulted in defeat during the American War of Independence.

== Development of the Fiscal-Naval State ==
The continuous demands of this long struggle fundamentally forged the British state. Historian Anthony Page argues that Britain developed a distinctive "fiscal-naval state" during the Seventy Years War, which proved superior to its rival's military and financial structure.

- Fiscal Strength: The British state, via the powerful combination of Crown and Parliament, was able to tax more and borrow more reliably than France.

- By 1810, Britain's tax revenue reached over 18% of national economic output, compared to only 12% for the larger French economy.

- The Bank of England was used to manage a reliable public debt, borrowed at lower interest rates than France's individual, high-interest loans.

- In contrast, the French ancien régime was constrained by privileged tax exemptions for the aristocracy and Church, leading to a financial crisis that helped spark the French revolution.

- Naval Focus: Approximately half of Britain's military budget was spent on the Royal Navy. Unlike large Continental armies, this expenditure acted as a significant stimulus to the British economy, creating large contracts for shipbuilding, iron foundries, and agricultural goods, which supported the nation's industrializing economy.
- National Identity: The 1740s marked an acceleration of population growth, the development of a sense of Britishness (fueled by the 1745 Jacobite uprising), the adoption of anthems like Rule Britannia and God Save the King, and the first references to "the British Empire" as a single entity. The army, once seen as a threat to "English liberty," grew in professionalism and by 1815 was hailed as a heroic defender of "British liberty" against Napoleon.

The high-tax, high-debt British state, sustained by its formidable navy and its continental engagement, was ultimately able to fund the "organization of victory" over Napoleon, establishing Britain as a dominant global power in the nineteenth century.

== Sources ==
- Szabo, Franz A.J. (2007). The Seven Years' War in Europe 1756–1763. Routledge. ISBN 978-0-582-29272-7.
- Calloway, Colin G. (2007). The Scratch of a Pen: 1763 and the Transformation of North America. Oxford University Press. ISBN 978-0195331271.
- Kagan, Frederick (2007). The End of the Old Order: Napoleon and Europe, 1801–1805. Hachette Books. ISBN 978-0-306-81645-1.
