= Margaret Stewart =

Margaret Stewart or Stuart may refer to:

== Royalty and nobility ==
- Margaret Stewart, Duchess of Touraine (c. 1370 - c. 1450), Scottish princess, daughter of Robert III and Annabella Drummond
- Margaret Stewart, Countess of Angus (died 1417), wife of Thomas, Earl of Mar; mother of George Douglas, 1st Earl of Angus
- Margaret Stewart, Dauphine of France (1424–1445), princess of Scotland; Dauphine of France as wife to future Louis XI
- Margaret Stewart (born c. 1455), daughter of James II of Scotland and niece of the Dauphine
- Margaret of Denmark, Queen of Scotland (1456–1486), daughter of King Christian I of Denmark and wife of James III, King of Scots
- Margaret Tudor (1489–1541), queen and regent of Scotland, wife of James IV of Scotland and sister of Henry VIII of England
- Margaret Stewart, Lady Gordon (born 1498), daughter of James IV of Scotland and Margaret Drummond
- Margaret Douglas (1515–1578), married name Margaret Stewart, countess of Lennox and half-sister of James V of Scotland
- Margaret Howard, Countess of Nottingham (c. 1591–1639), née Margaret Stewart
- Margaret Stuart (1598–1600), daughter of James VI
- Margaret Stewart, Mistress of Ochiltree (died 1627), courtier in the household of Anne of Denmark

== Others ==
- Margaret Stuart (poet) (1889–1963), British poet and writer
- Margaret E. C. Stewart (1907–1986), Scottish archaeologist
- Margie Stewart (1919–2012), American model
- Margaret Stewart (herpetologist) (1927–2006), American herpetologist
- Margaret Stuart (athlete) (1934–1999), New Zealand sprinter and hurdler

== See also ==
- Peggy Stewart (disambiguation)
