= Roxburgh =

Civil parish in Roxburghshire, Scotland

Coordinates: 55.5965°N 2.4562°W

Roxburgh: Scottish Gaelic: Rosbrog
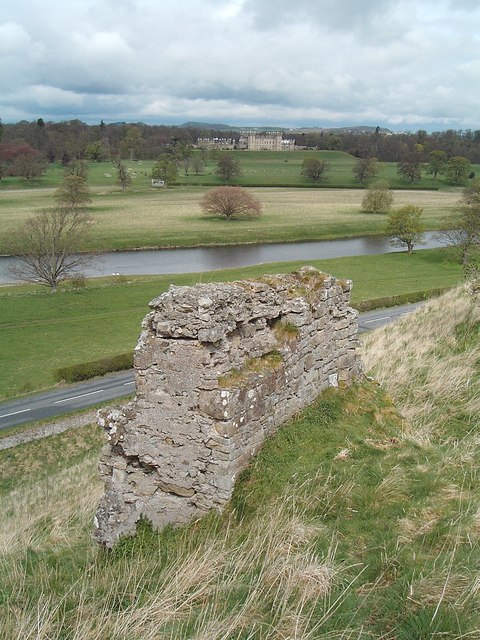
- The ruins of Roxburgh Castle (foreground), the River Tweed and Floors Castle

- Location within the Scottish Borders
- Population: 419 (2001)
- OS grid reference: NT713337
- Civil parish: Roxburgh
- Council area: Scottish Borders
- Lieutenancy area: Roxburgh, Ettrick and Lauderdale
- Country: Scotland
- Sovereign state: United Kingdom
- Post town: KELSO
- Postcode district: TD5
- Dialling code: 01573
- Police: Scotland
- Fire: Scottish
- Ambulance: Scottish
- UK Parliament: Berwickshire, Roxburgh and Selkirk
- Scottish Parliament: Ettrick, Roxburgh and Berwickshire

Roxburgh (/ˈrɒksbərə/) is a civil parish and formerly a royal burgh, in the historic county of Roxburghshire in the Scottish Borders, Scotland. It was an important trading burgh in High Medieval to early modern Scotland. In the Middle Ages it had at least as much importance as Edinburgh, Stirling, Perth, or Berwick-upon-Tweed, for a time acting as de facto capital (as royal residence of David I).

== History ==
Its significance lay in its position in the centre of some of Lowland Scotland's most agriculturally fertile areas, and its position upon the River Tweed, which allowed river transport of goods via the main seaport of Berwick-upon-Tweed. Its position also acted as a barrier to English invasion.

Standing on a defensible peninsula between the rivers Tweed and Teviot, with Roxburgh Castle guarding the narrow neck of the peninsula, it was a settlement of some importance during the reign of David I who conferred Royal Burgh status upon the town. At its zenith, between the reigns of William the Lion and James II, it was the site of the Royal mint. The town also had three churches and schools which operated under the auspices of the monks of Kelso Abbey. In 1237, the future Alexander III was born there.

English and Scots forces repeatedly captured and recaptured the town during the Scottish Wars of Independence. During his occupation of Scotland, Edward III of England resided at Roxburgh Castle, spending at least two birthdays there. The castle was besieged several times, notably in 1314, in the run-up to Bannockburn. Its final recapture in 1460 saw the town and castle destroyed. After this time the town never regained its importance because the final English capture of Berwick-upon-Tweed in 1482 left Roxburgh with little reason to exist, henceforth lacking a port.

Nothing remains standing of the town except some ruined segments of castle ramparts. Its site lies to the south of modern Kelso and Floors Castle, which lie on the other side of the Tweed. Roxburgh was superseded as the county town of the former county of Roxburghshire by Jedburgh.

Very little else is known about this site, in part due to the landowner Duke of Roxburghe's refusal to allow archaeologists to dig until the Channel Four television programme Time Team undertook excavation work in 2003. Their findings were broadcast on 21 March 2004.

== Etymology ==
Roxburgh probably comes from Old English *hrōcas burh, "rook's burgh".

== Roxburgh village ==
Today the name Roxburgh belongs to a small village about 2 miles (3 kilometres) south-southwest of the site of the historic Roxburgh.

== See also ==
- List of places in the Scottish Borders
