= Roxburgh Castle =

Ruined castle near Roxburgh, Scotland

Coordinates: 55°35′47″N 2°27′24″W

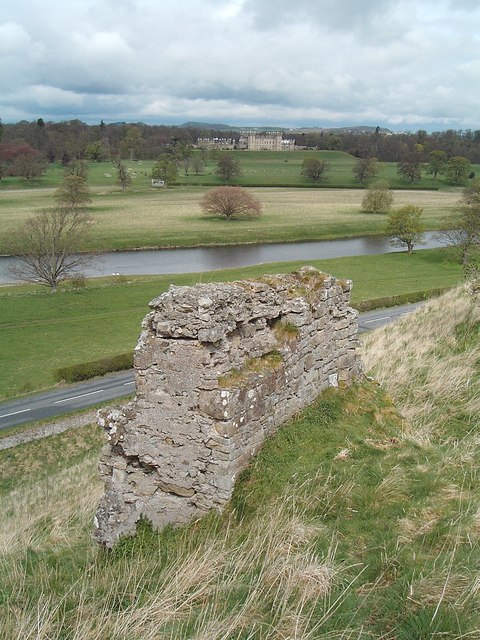
Ruins of Roxburgh Castle, with Floors Castle in the background

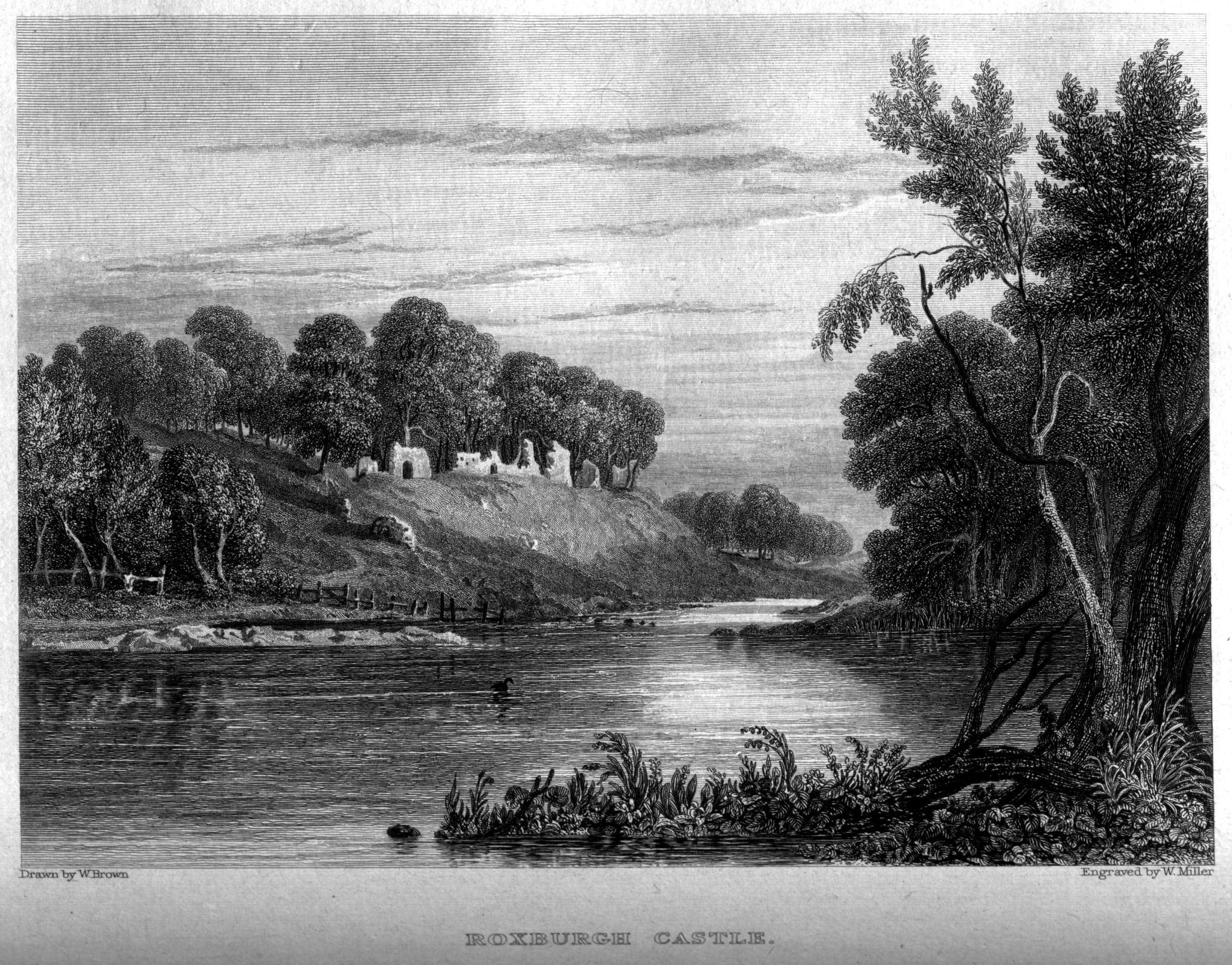
Roxburgh Castle, engraving by William Miller after W. Brown, 1830

Roxburgh Castle, 1920, by E. W. Haslehust

Roxburgh Castle is a ruined royal castle that overlooks the junction of the rivers Tweed and Teviot, in the Borders region of Scotland. The town and castle developed into the royal burgh of Roxburgh, which the Scots destroyed along with the castle after capturing it in 1460. Today the ruins stand in the grounds of Floors Castle, the seat of the Duke of Roxburghe, across the river from Kelso.

== History ==
Tradition states that King David I founded the castle; it is first recorded in c.1128 during his reign. In 1174, it was surrendered to England after the capture of William I at Alnwick, and was often in English hands thereafter. The Scots made many attempts to regain the fortress. King Edward I of England imprisoned Mary Bruce in a cage hung outside the castle from 1306 to 1310. On 19 February 1314, it was retaken by Sir James Douglas (the "Black Douglas"), in a night attack. His men clothed in black cloaks were apparently mistaken for cattle. They then used rope and board ladders to climb the walls. King Robert the Bruce ordered the castle demolished by his brother Edward Bruce, Earl of Carrick, and in the words of the Lanercost Chronicle "all that beautiful castle the Scots pulled down to the ground, like the other castles that they had succeeded in capturing, lest the English should ever again rule the land by holding the castles."

The castle was captured by the forces of Edward III of England in 1334. Alexander Ramsay and his men recaptured Roxburgh Castle for the Scots on 30 March 1342 by means of a daring night escalade. It was retaken by the English shortly after the Battle of Neville's Cross in October 1346. A Scottish siege in 1417 necessitated repairs.

In August 1436, King James I of Scotland planned to conduct a siege of the castle. The king had gathered a huge army, sporting “...fine, large guns, both cannons and mortars", manned by German gun crews under the command of Johannes Paule "Master of the King’s engines". There was also a substantial contingent of Highlanders and Islesmen and archers brought by Alexander of Islay, Earl of Ross (who brought 3,000 men to the siege), as well as men-at-arms from the Lowlands, including the forces of Archibald, Earl of Douglas and his distant kin and rival, William, Earl of Angus (head of the Red Douglases of Tantallon). However, the Queen arrived to warn her husband that, certain princes of the realm were conspiring against him and a plot was afoot to kill him. Given that and the king's awareness that the Archbishop of York, the Bishop of Durham and the Earls of Northumberland had arrived with a force of northerners, he left the battlefield and his army dispersed, leaving behind his expensive German equipment.

The Scots again besieged Roxburgh in 1460; in the course of the action metal fragments from the explosion of one of his bombards killed King James II of Scotland. However, the Scots stormed Roxburgh, capturing it, and James' queen, Mary of Guelders, had the castle demolished.

In 1545, during the War of the Rough Wooing, the English garrison commanded by Ralph Bulmer built a rectangular fort on the site at the instigation of the Earl of Hertford. In 1547, Hertford ordered the surveyor William Ridgeway and the Master Carpenter John Revell to build to a brewhouse, using a frame made for Wark Castle. Bulmer complained that Ridgeway's visits were infrequent and works incomplete. He wanted to build a blacksmith's forge and a bulwark to the south to give access to drinking water. This fort was destroyed in 1550 by the terms of the Treaty of Boulogne.

The ruins of Roxburgh Castle stand in the grounds of Floors Castle, the seat of the Duke of Roxburghe. These consist of a large mound, with some small fragments of stone walls, especially on the south side.

The 1314 capture of the castle is one of the inspirations of "The Three Perils of Man" by James Hogg.

In 1818 David Erskine, 11th Earl of Buchan brought from Dryburgh Abbey a young Cedar of Lebanon which he presented to the Marquis of Beaumont. The Marquis planted it near the spot when James II of Scotland had been killed in 1460.

== See also ==
- List of places in the Scottish Borders
