= Peggy Stewart =

Peg or Peggy Stewart may refer to:

- Peggy Stewart (ship)
- Peggy Stewart (actress) (1923–2019), American actress
- Peg Stewart, American actress fl.1970s-1990s; in "Band Candy" episode of Buffy the Vampire Slayer

== See also ==
- Peggy Stewart House, Annapolis, Maryland
- Margaret Stewart (disambiguation)
- Stewart (surname)
