= Capture of Roxburgh (1460) =

Siege during Anglo-Scottish Wars

- Part of the Anglo-Scottish Wars
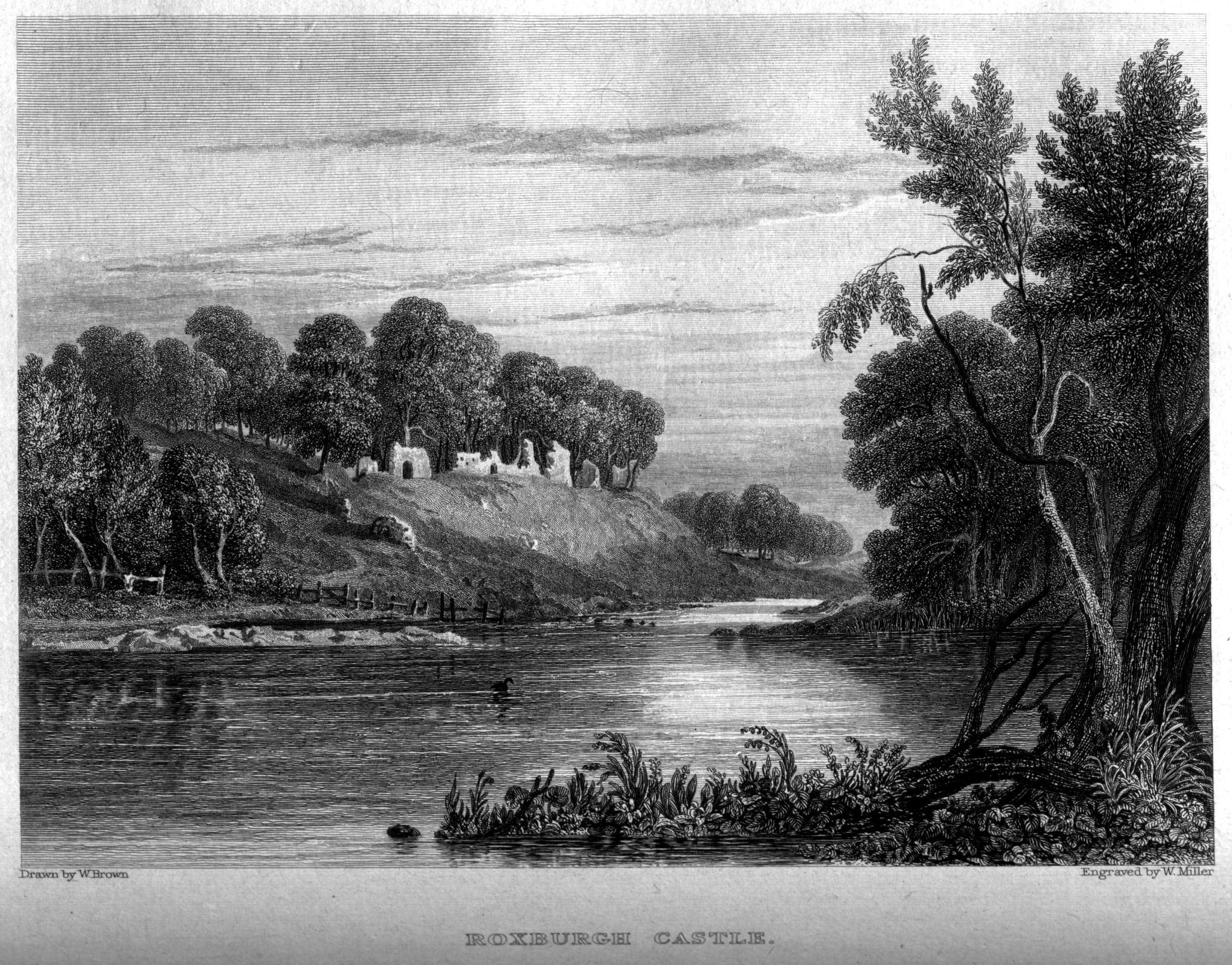
- 1830 engraving of the remains of Roxburgh Castle
Date	July – 5 August 1460
Location	Roxburgh Castle, Anglo-Scottish Border 55.5966°N 2.4566°W
Result	Scottish victory

Belligerents
Kingdom of Scotland	Kingdom of England

Commanders and leaders
King James II ‽ Queen Mary	Unknown
- James II was killed when his own cannon exploded.
- Location within Scottish Borders

The capture of Roxburgh was a siege that took place during the Anglo-Scottish Wars. Following the Second War of Scottish Independence intermittent conflict continued along the Anglo-Scottish border with Roxburgh Castle being held by the English since 1346 and by the 1380s was one of the last English held strongholds in Scotland. In July 1460 James II of Scotland began a campaign to reclaim Roxburgh, aiming to take advantage of the fact that the Wars of the Roses were raging in England.

During the siege James was mortally wounded when one of his own cannons exploded and the siege was continued by his wife, Mary of Guelders. The castle surrendered on 5 August and was subsequently destroyed by the attackers.

== Background ==
During the Second War of Scottish Independence in the 1330s lands in Southern Scotland had been ceded to England, with English garrisons as far north as Perth or Dunnottar Castle and successive Scottish governments attempted to reclaim these lands. Conflict along the Anglo-Scottish border continued, with Roxburgh castle held continuously by the English since 1346. This intermittent conflict led to the decline of the city of Roxburgh as trading patterns in the region broke down, and by 1460 it was little more than a garrison post. By the 1380s Berwick, Roxburgh and a handful of minor keeps were the only strongholds still in English hands. James launched attacks against English holdings between 1455-1460, as part of efforts to persuade the French to join a united attack on England.

By 1460, England was in the middle of a civil war, the Wars of the Roses, and James II had been negotiating with both sides in this struggle, intending to exploit the opportunity this presented. A parliament due to meet in Aberdeen was moved to Edinburgh as the fragilities of Henry VI's regime became apparent. A muster was called for shortly after the conclusion of the parliament in early July.

Prior to the attack on Roxburgh, the English had believed that Berwick was the target, and were thus outmanoeuvred.

== Siege ==
James and his army first arrived at Roxburgh in July, first taking the English dominated town before laying siege to the castle. The castle itself is located on a triangular hill flanked by the rivers Tweed and Teviot to the north and south. Two ditches defended the approach to the castle between these rivers, while a curtain wall enclosed the whole area.

On 3 August James was standing close to one of his cannons when he ordered it to be fired. The cannon exploded, mortally wounding him. Writing 100 years later Robert Lindsay of Pitscottie stated the king's thigh was snapped in two and he was "stricken to the ground and died hastily".

Following his death, James' queen, Mary of Guelders, took command of the siege. The castle surrendered on 5 August, with no prisoners being taken.

== Aftermath ==
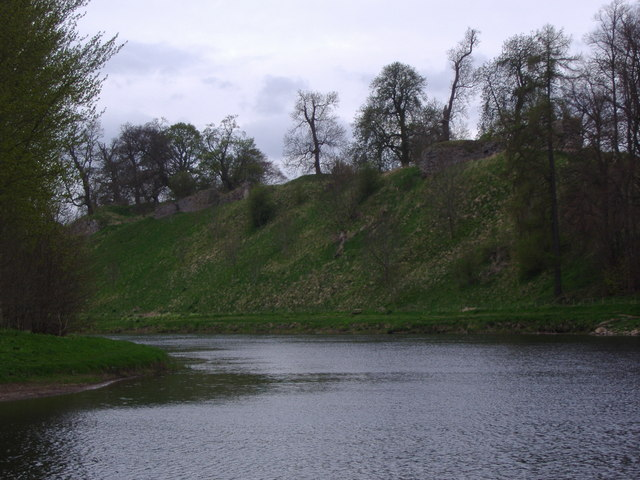
After James II was killed during the siege, the castle was slighted and left in ruins.

Following the siege the castle was destroyed so it could not be used in war again, and has remained a ruin ever since.

With the death of the King a regency council was formed to govern Scotland until James III of Scotland was old enough to rule. This council was controlled by Mary and Bishop James Kennedy. During this time, Mary would prove an able diplomat, gaining Berwick in negotiations with the Lancastrians.

Following the recovery of Roxburgh and Berwick peace seemed more attractive to James III who agreed a peace treaty with Edward IV in 1474.

== Sources ==
- Aikman, James (1829). The History of Scotland: With Notes, and a Continuation to the Present Time : in Six Volumes. Edinburgh: Balfour and Co.
- Archibald, Malcolm (2016). Dance If Ye Can: A Dictionary of Scottish Battles. Creativia. ISBN 978-1536821796.
- Borthwick, Alan R. (2010). "James II". Oxford Dictionary of National Biography (online ed.). Oxford University Press. doi:10.1093/ref:odnb/14588. (Subscription, Wikipedia Library access or UK public library membership required.)
- Brown, Michael (2007). "Anglo-Scottish relations: 2. 1100–1513". In Lynch, Michael (ed.). The Oxford companion to Scottish history. New York: Oxford University Press. ISBN 9780199234820.
- Cavendish, Richard (8 August 2010). "James II of Scots killed at Roxburgh". History Today. 60 (8).
- Hartley, Cathy (2013). A Historical Dictionary of British Women. Routledge. ISBN 978-1-135-35533-3.
- Macdougall, Norman (2015). "Mary of Gueldres". In Crowcroft, Robert; Cannon, John (eds.). The Oxford Companion to British history (2nd ed.). Oxford & New York: Oxford University Press. ISBN 9780199677832.
- McGarrigle, Brian (29 January 2019). "The Siege of Roxburgh Castle 1460". www.scottishcastlesassociation.com. Scottish Castles Association.
- Oram, Richard (2007). "Borders: 1. to 1603". In Lynch, Michael (ed.). The Oxford companion to Scottish history. New York: Oxford University Press. ISBN 9780199234820.
- Peberdy, Robert; Waller, Philip (2020). A Dictionary of British and Irish History. John Wiley & Sons. ISBN 978-0-631-20155-7.
- RCAHMS. Roxburgh Castle. Historic Environment Scotland.
