= Margaret E. C. Stewart =

Margaret Stewart MA PhD DLitt MBA Hon FSA Scot
- Born: 28 February 1907
- Died: 4 June 1986 (aged 79)
- Occupation: Archaeologist

Academic background
- Education: University of Edinburgh
- Thesis: The Distribution of Early Bronze Age Types in Scotland
- Doctoral advisor: Vere Gordon Childe

Margaret Enid Crichton Stewart, MBE (née Mitchell; 28 February 1907 – 4 June 1986) was a Scottish archaeologist and independent scholar, specialising in prehistory and community archaeology. She had a distinguished wartime career in Naval Intelligence.

== Early life and education ==
Margaret Mitchell was born on 28 February 1907 in Trivandrum, Travancore in southern India. She was daughter of Professor Alexander Crichton Mitchell, a Scottish meteorologist, and Agnes Robertson. Shortly after her birth, the family returned to Edinburgh.

Stewart went to school in Edinburgh before studying at the University of Edinburgh, where she graduated with an undergraduate Master of Arts (MA Hons) degree in 1930. She was the first recipient of the Class Medal in Archaeology in 1928–1929. She went on to undertake a Doctor of Philosophy (PhD) degree under the supervision of Professor V. Gordon Childe in 1934; she was the only student to complete a doctorate with Childe. Her research focused on the Scottish Beaker pottery and her thesis was titled "The Distribution of Early Bronze Age types in Scotland", submitted on 11 April 1933. It was later published in volume 85 of the Proceedings of the Society of Antiquaries of Scotland.

During the Second World War Stewart played a key role in Naval Intelligence. She was the most senior female officer in NID, leading Section 8K, in charge of all naval intelligence from the Elbe to the Spanish border. She left an account of her experience, in particular about the misogynistic undervaluing of women's contributions to the work, in a report now in the National Archives, Kew. Her career has been described in a number of accounts of naval intelligence.

== Contributions to archaeology ==
Stewart can be identified in photographs of Childe's 1927–1930 excavations of Skara Brae in Orkney, alongside other female archaeologists who had previously been dismissed as visitors or tourists, but who can be seen holding trowels, which indicate their active role in the excavations.

During the early stages of Perth's urban development, Stewart quickly became aware, and was pivotal for the awareness, of the archaeology lying underneath the local streets and buildings. She was responsible for the creation of various groups which would monitor these developments and take the opportunities to further explore local archaeology.

Stewart is also known for her involvement in major excavations of various important monuments including: stone circles at Monzie, Crieff, Scone and at Lundin, Carse and Tirinie farms (Aberfeldy); chambered cairns at Dull, Aberfeldy and Clach na Tiompan in the Sma' Glen; hut circles at Dalnaglar, Glen Shee; a short cist cemetery at Almondbank, Perth; deserted settlements at Allean Forest, Loch Tummel and at Allt na Moine Buidhe, Rannoch; a circular homestead above Queen's View, Loch Tummel; and the stone circle and henge at Moncrieff, Bridge of Earn. She was director of excavation for Breadalbane Heritage Society throughout the 1960s. Stewart also carried out important work with her research into the location and distribution of cup-and-ring rock art, resulting in a large amount of information which she was still compiling by the time of her death.

Stewart was involved with a number of societies and professional bodies. She was a member of the Edinburgh League of Prehistorians (ELP) (1929-1948), a society founded by Gordon Childe and open to all interested in prehistory. The ELP organized lectures, excursions and excavations. The first lecture was delivered in January 1930 and she organized the first excursion to the Scottish Borders in the same year. She was elected vice-president of the ELP in 1933. Later, she also acted as the Vice-President and President of the Scottish Regional Group for the Council for British Archaeology (later Archaeology Scotland). She also edited their flagship publication, Discovery and Excavation in Scotland.

Stewart had a great interest in sharing Scottish archaeology and was involved with various local communities. She served on many local and national committees, established the archaeological section of Perthshire Society of Natural Science (1948) and was a founding member of the Perth Civic Trust which she chaired between 1970 and 1972. Stewart was the first honorary president of Breadalbane Archaeological Society founded in 1962. She also helped in the setting up of the Tayside and Fife Archaeological Committee. At a time when archaeology was more interested in gaining a more professional attitude, Stewart was encouraging of the involvement and training of students and others, as well as volunteer participation in excavations. For example, during the excavations at the four-poster stone circle on Lundin Farm Road (1963), she divided the site into sections to "give everyone experience of digging".

Her publications included articles in the Proceedings of the Society of Antiquaries of Scotland and the Transactions and Proceedings of the Perthshire Society of Natural Science.

== Awards ==
Stewart was appointed a Member of the Order of the British Empire (MBE) "for services to archaeology in Scotland" in the 1983 Queen's Birthday Honours. She was honoured by the University of St Andrews with a DLitt degree as recognition of her work, dedication and accomplishments. She was the first woman to be distinguished as an Honorary Fellow of the Society of Antiquaries of Scotland.

== Death and legacy ==
Stewart died in 1986 and in her will she endowed the Margaret Stewart Bequest Scholarship for the study of European Beaker pottery and related topics, naming the Abercromby Professor of Archaeology as chair of its Trustees.

== Personal life ==
In 1936, Margaret Mitchell married John Stewart, a Perth solicitor, after which she moved to Perthshire.

== Selected publications ==
- Mitchell, M. E. C. (1933) The Distribution of Early Bronze Age Types in Scotland. University of Edinburgh. Thesis submitted for Degree of PhD.
- Stewart, M. E. C. (1934) "A new analysis of the Early Bronze Beaker pottery in Scotland". Proceedings of the Society of Antiquaries of Scotland, 68: 132–189.
- Stewart, M. E. C.; Henshall, A. S. (1954) "Clach na Tiompan, Wester Glen Almond". Discovery Excavation in Scotland, 12.
- Stewart, M. E. C. (1958–9) "Strath Tay in the Second millennium BC – a field survey". Proceedings of the Society of Antiquaries of Scotland, 92: 72–84.
- Stewart, M. E. C. 1962 "The excavation of two circular enclosures at Dalnaglar, Perthshire". Proceedings of the Society of Antiquaries of Scotland 95 (1961–62): 134–158.
- Stewart, M. E. C. (1966) "The excavation of a setting of standing stones at Lundin Farm near Aberfeldy, Perthshire". Proceedings of the Society of Antiquaries of Scotland, 96: 126–149.
- Stewart, M. E. C. (1969) "The ring forts of Central Perthshire". Transactions and Proceedings of the Perthshire Society of Natural Science, 12: 21-32.
- Stewart, M. E. C. 1973 "The prehistory of Perthshire of the 4th, 3rd and 2nd millennium BC". Transactions of the Perthshire Society of Natural Science (Special Issue): 5–13.
- Stewart, M. E. C. 1985 "The excavation of a henge, stone circles and metal-working area at Moncrieffe, Perthshire". Proceedings of the Society of Antiquaries of Scotland 115: 125–150.
- Stewart, M. E. C. and Barclay, G. J. 1997 "Excavations in burial and ceremonial sites of the Bronze Age in Tayside". Tayside and Fife Archaeological Journal 3: 22–54.
