= Katie Stevenson =

Scottish historian

Katie Stevenson is Dean of the Faculty of Arts, and a professor of history, at Monash University. She is former Vice-Principal at the University of St Andrews, Keeper of Scottish History and Archaeology at National Museums Scotland, and former director of the Institute of Scottish Historical Research at the University of St Andrews. She has written several books on medieval Scotland including the New History of Scotland book, Power and Propaganda, Scotland 1306-1488 at Edinburgh University Press. In 2014 she was awarded a research medal for the Humanities and Creative Arts from the Royal Society of Edinburgh. She won the Maclehose-Dickinson Essay Prize for 2003. Stevenson has presented radio, television and podcasts about medieval Scotland, and contributed to the London Review of Books. She is on the editorial board of Cogent OA Arts and Humanities.

== Select bibliography ==
Chivalry and the Medieval Past, The Boydell Press, 2016.
Chivalry and Knighthood in Scotland, Boydell and Brewer, 2006.
The Herald in Late Medieval Europe, Boydell and Brewer, 2009.
Power and Propaganda, Scotland 1306-1488, Edinburgh University Press, 2014.

== Links ==
St Andrews Staff Page
Heraldica Nova

== See also ==
- Hamish Scott
- Norman Macdougall
