= Archdeacon of the Isles =

The Archdeacon of the Isles (or Sodor) was the only archdeacon in the diocese of the Isles, acting as a subordinate of the Bishop of the Isles. The number and names of the prebends, if any, associated with the archdeaconry in the later Middle Ages are not known. Before the break-away of the diocese of Man during the Western Schism, the archdeacons held Kirk Andreas as a prebend. The office seems to have fallen into disuse after the time of Alasdair Caimbeul, who received crown presentation to the position in 1592. It was to be revived in 1662.

== List of archdeacons of Man ==
- Diarmait (Dermicius), fl. 1180x1190–1217x1219
- Lawrence, x1246–1248
- Domhnall (Dompnald), fl. 1253 x 1265
- Makaboy (Mac Fhiodhbhuidhe?), fl. 1270
- A [_], fl. 1302
- Cormac, fl. 1320
- John Dempster, fl. 1349
- Nigel Mauricii, died 1372

== List of archdeacons of the Isles ==
- Beoan [mac Eoin] Mac Cholgain (Bean Johannis Macuilquen), 1372–1390/97
- Niall Mac Iomhair, 1390–1408
- Crisdean Mac Domhnaill Elich, fl. 1408
- Gille-Brighde Mac Dughaill, died x 1416
- John de Carrick (Eoin a Charraig), provided 1416
- Eachann MacGill-Eain, 1416–1441
- Andrew of Dunoon, 1441–1456x1457
- Niall Mac Cormaig, provided 1455
- Aonghas of the Isles, provided 1456
- Gilbert Smerles, 1457–1460
- James Borthwick, provided 1457
- Donnchadh [_], fl. 1462
- Crisdean mac Gille-Brighde (Bricii), fl. 1463–1469
- Gilbert Wright, fl. 1472
- Niall mac Gille-Brighde (MacIlvride, MacYlwryd, Makkikbreid), fl. 1476–1479
- Thomas Clerk (Tomas Cleireach), fl. 1500
- Thomas Fleming, died 1516
- Richard Lawson, 1516–1541x1544
- Ruairidh MacGill-Eain (Roderick MacLean), fl. 1544–1548
- Gill-Easbaig Mac an Rothaich (Archibald Munro), fl. 1548
- Domhnall Mac an Rothaich (Donald Munro), fl 1553–1563x1584
- Domhnall Carsuel (Donald Carswell), died 1592
- Alasdair Caimbeul (Alexander Campbell), fl. 1592
