= Hamish Scott (historian) =

Scottish historian

Hamish Scott FBA FRHistS FRSE FSA Scot MAE
- Born: Hamish Marshall Scott; 12 July 1946
- Died: 7 December 2022 (aged 76)
- Occupations: Historian and academic
- Title: Wardlaw Professor of International History
- Spouses: Julia M. H. Smith (m. 2005)

Academic background
- Education: George Heriot's School
- Alma mater: University of Edinburgh; London School of Economics

Academic work
- Discipline: History
- Sub-discipline: Early modern history; Long eighteenth century; Nobility
- Institutions: University of Birmingham; University of St Andrews; Jesus College, Oxford

Hamish Marshall Scott (12 July 1946 – 7 December 2022) was a Scottish historian and academic. He was Professor of International History (2000 to 2006) then Wardlaw Professor of International History (2006 to 2009) at the University of St Andrews. Having studied at the University of Edinburgh and the London School of Economics, he began his career lecturing at the University of Birmingham.

== Life and career ==
Scott was born on 12 July 1946, and received a scholarship to study at George Heriot's School, a private school in Edinburgh, Scotland. From there he proceeded to the University of Edinburgh, before transferring to the London School of Economics for his PhD.

Scott began his teaching career at the University of Birmingham in 1970 before joining the University of St Andrews in 1979, where he remained until his retirement in 2009. From 2017 until his death in 2022, Scott was a senior research fellow at Jesus College, Oxford.

In 2005, he married Julia Smith.

In May 2016, Scott was one of 300 prominent historians, including Simon Schama and Niall Ferguson, who were signatories to a letter to The Guardian, telling voters that if they chose to leave the European Union on 23 June, they would be condemning Britain to irrelevance.

== Honours ==
In 2006, Scott was elected a Fellow of the British Academy (FBA), the United Kingdom's national academy for the humanities and social sciences. In 2008, he was elected a Fellow of the Royal Society of Edinburgh (FRSE). He was elected a Member of the Academia Europaea (MAE) in 2009 and a fellow of the Royal Historical Society (FRHistS) in 2000.

== Legacy ==
In 2026, Scott's widow Julia Smith established the Hamish Scott Memorial Studentship for a doctoral student in early modern European history at Jesus College, Oxford. Previously, a spend-down graduate studentship in Scott's honour, for a master's student in early modern history, had been inaugurated at the college in 2024.

== Selected works ==
- Scott, H. M. (1990). British foreign policy in the age of the American Revolution. Oxford: Clarendon Press. ISBN 978-0198201953.
- Scott, H. M., ed. (1990). Enlightened absolutism: reform and reformers in later eighteenth-century Europe. Basingstoke: Macmillan. ISBN 978-0333439616.
- Scott, H. M. (2001). The emergence of the Eastern powers, 1756-1775. Cambridge: Cambridge University Press. ISBN 978-0521792691.
- Scott, H. M. (2006). The birth of a great power system, 1740-1815. London: Pearson. ISBN 978-0582217171.
- Scott, H. M., ed. (2015). The Oxford Handbook of Early Modern European History, 1350-1750 Volume I: Peoples and Place. Oxford: Oxford University Press. ISBN 978-0199597253.
- Scott, H. M., ed. (2015). The Oxford Handbook of Early Modern European History, 1350-1750 Volume II: Cultures and Power. Oxford: Oxford University Press. ISBN 978-0199597260.

== See also ==
- Katie Stevenson
- Norman Macdougall
