= Hours of Catherine of Cleves =

Dutch illuminated book of hours of about 1440

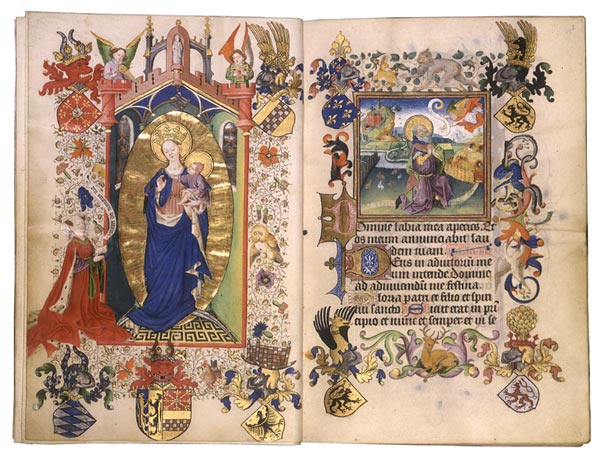
Catherine of Cleves kneels before the Virgin and Child. Her arms, with those of her husband, Duke Arnold of Guelders, are in the bottom center; the arms of her ancestors are in each corner.

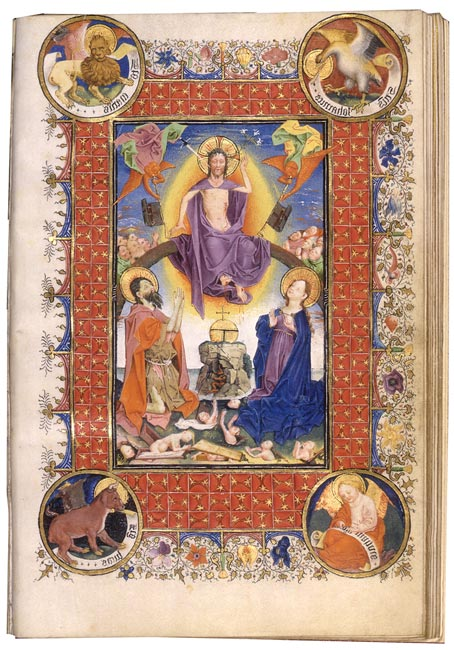
Another page

The Hours of Catherine of Cleves (Morgan Library and Museum, now divided in two parts, M. 917 and M. 945, the latter sometimes called the Guennol Hours or, less commonly, the Arenberg Hours) is an ornately illuminated manuscript in the Gothic art style, produced in about 1440 by the anonymous Dutch artist known as the Master of Catherine of Cleves. It is one of the most lavishly illuminated manuscripts to survive from the 15th century and has been described as one of the masterpieces of Northern European illumination. This book of hours contains the usual offices, prayers and litanies in Latin, along with supplemental texts, decorated with 157 colorful and gilded illuminations. Today, both parts of the manuscript that forms this book are housed at the Morgan Library and Museum in New York City.

== History ==
=== Origin ===
The Hours of Catherine of Cleves (The Hours) was commissioned for Catherine, Duchess of Guelders and Countess of Zutphen, upon the occasion of her marriage to Arnold, Duke of Guelders, on 26 January 1430. John Plummer, Curator of Medieval Manuscripts at the Morgan Library, suggested that this Horae was commissioned for the wedding in 1430, but it required time to complete. The Hours was produced in Utrecht and not completed until after 1434, probably around 1440. The earlier date is based on the picture of a coin, minted in 1434 by Philip the Good, Duke of Burgundy, shown in the border of M. 917, p. 240; Plummer, Plate 117.

==== Patrons ====
The Hours was commissioned for Catherine of Cleves by either her father or her husband. Since the 11th century, the town of Cleves had been the home of the venerable and wealthy Counts of Cleves. The Counts were elevated to a ducal house in 1417, the year Catherine was born. The Cleves family seat is the Schwanenburg, the Swan Castle, with its massive square tower, the Schwanenturm, the Tower of the Knights of the Swan, which is immortalized in Richard Wagner's opera, Lohengrin.

The first two full page miniatures celebrate her illustrious lineage. The first page shows Catherine of Cleves kneeling before the Virgin and the Christ Child, who take a personal interest in her salvation. Catherine is identified by her arms, in the center bottom, shown with those of her husband, Duke Arnold of Guelders. The borders of both pages are decorated with an heraldic display of the Arms of her eight great-great-grandfathers:

Count Diderik of Cleves,
Count Engelbert of Mark,
Duke Ludwig of Bavaria,
Duke Ludwig of Liegnitz,
King Jean the Good of France,
Duke Lodewijk of Flanders,
Duke Wilhelm of Jülich, and
Duke Otto of Ravensberg.

Catherine of Cleves is shown kneeling before The Virgin and the Christ Child, M. 945, folio 1 verso; Plummer, Plate 1. She is shown giving alms in Piety, the sixth gift of the Holy Spirit, M. 917, p. 65; Plummer, Plate 57. Catherine is also shown kneeling, with the Virgin, before Christ, in The Crucifixion, M. 917, p. 160; Plummer, Plate 96. Her husband, Arnold, Duke of Guelders, may be the lord shown kneeling before Christ in Fear of the Lord, the seventh gift of the Holy Spirit, M. 917, p. 58; Plummer, Plate 58. In the reconstructed book, his portrait follows that of Catherine's in Piety. And, some of his coinage is shown in the border of M. 917, p. 240; Plummer, Plate 117.

==== Artist ====
The Master of Catherine of Cleves was the anonymous illuminator, who is named after this masterpiece of Netherlandish illumination. The Cleves Master might have been a member of the van Aken family of painters. A study of the miniatures indicates that the Cleves Master designed and painted over 157 miniatures, as well as the principal border decorations, with minimal assistance from two workshop assistants.

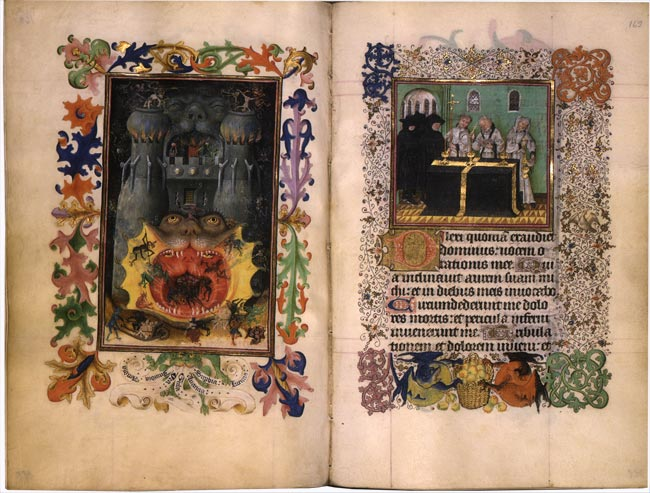
Hours of Catherine of Cleves.

The Hours have several anomalies. Hell was usually not depicted in Books of Hours, though normal in the Last Judgements in churches, because the sight was thought unwelcome to the often female patrons. The Master's Mouth of Hell at the beginning of the Office of the Dead actually shows three animal mouths: an uppermost stone-like portal, framed by souls boiling in pots, screams in agony; a lower mouth grimaces, its lips drawn apart by demons; and within that lower mouth, a fire-red creature opens its own jaws. The surrounding tableau of demons tormenting the souls of the dead was painted nearly 50 yrs before Hieronymus Bosch painted his. Marginal genre scenes clearly relate to the religious scenes in the main miniatures above. Details of the book, such as traps and nets in borders, relate very closely to details in the Merode Altarpiece by Robert Campin (or a follower), and suggest strongly that the master knew works by Campin. Stories flow through successive pictures: a woman watches a man die, weeps, then goes on a pilgrimage; souls within Hell dine upon the Host, and are rescued by an angel. There is little repetition, and the miniatures form a harmonious whole.

Antithesis and unusual iconography conveys irony and humor. Saint James the Less was known for his abstinence, so the border depicts men drinking wine. Saint Gregory, the great Church administrator, is shown with a border of gold and silver coins. Saint Peter is painted with the key of the Church, standing above a triskelion (a reference to the Trinity) of fresh fish as the fisher of men. Saint Lawrence is shown with the grill of his martyrdom, and the alms purse attribute as the patron of the poor. His border shows fresh fish ready for grilling, and the big fish eating the little fish, representing the rich devouring the poor, a common literary and pictorial theme of the 15th and 16th centuries. These fantastic trompe-l'œil borders were to influence the work of the Master of Mary of Burgundy 30 years later.

The Cleves Master was a superb realist who showed scenes of 15th-century Utrecht, especially in the small bas-de-page pictures. The Holy Family at dinner shows Saint Joseph wearing clogs and spooning gruel, while reclining in a barrel chair in front of a lively fire. The Virgin is seated on the other side of the fire, suckling Jesus in her neat, orderly kitchen.

By reconstructing The Hours from the two principal manuscripts, one can see the Master grow as an artist over the several years it took to illuminate The Hours. The early miniatures and iconography are comparable to the contemporary panel paintings of Robert Campin and Jan van Eyck, and share many close similarities. The later miniatures are painted with the imagination, originality, and vibrant colors that characterize Early Netherlandish painting and the later developments of that tradition. This originality of technique and awareness of everyday life prompted Delaissé to call the Cleves Master "the ancestor of the 17th century Dutch school of painting."

=== Modern period ===
After disappearing from view for some 400 years, the Hours of Catherine of Cleves surfaced in 1856. Jacques Joseph Techener, a Parisian book dealer, offered The Hours for sale at 15,000 francs. At some time before 1896, Prince Charles d’Arenberg purchased The Hours (M 945); or rather, he bought half of The Hours.

In 1963, Frederick Adams was offered another Cleves Master Horae (M 917) by an unnamed European owner. A comparison of this discovered book with the Guennol Hours (M 945) revealed that not only were they by the same artist, and from the same workshop, but both Horae were incomplete and complemented each other. This observation suggested that they were once a single volume, which had been deliberately disassembled into two separate liturgical books. Scholars believe that sometime in the 1850s, The Hours was separated into two volumes, and several leaves were removed. Microscopic examination revealed that some of the rubrics had been deliberately erased, so the leaves could be reassembled without a tell-tale break in the text. The two volumes have been recovered; but, the 9–12 missing leaves are presumed lost.

In 1970, the Guennol Hours (M.945) was purchased by the Pierpont Morgan Library through the Belle da Costa Greene Foundation, with additional assistance of various Library Fellows. By studying the text, the iconography, and the physical makeup of the two volumes, John Plummer, Morgan Library Curator of Medieval Manuscripts, reconstructed the original sequence of the original, single volume of the Hours of Catherine of Cleves.

In connection with a 2010 exhibition entitled “Demons and Devotion: The Hours of Catherine of Cleves,” the Morgan Library disbound the two volumes to display 93 of the illuminations in their original order. After the show which ends on May 2, 2010, the library will rebind the book with the leaves in their proper order.

==== Provenance ====
Catherine, Duchess of Guelders, for whom it was made, 1440–1445 (single volume)
Ermengard of Lochhorst, who allegedly received it from Catherine
Disappeared for 400 years
Jacques Techener, Parisian Book dealer, 1856 (divided into 2 volumes: M 945, M 917; and missing leaves)

M 917

Baron Maurice de Rothschild, 1936 (M 917)
Frederick Adams, Bookseller, discovers another Cleves Master Horae, 1963 (M 917)
Morgan Library and Museum, purchased 1963 (M 917)

M945

Prince Charles d'Arenberg, purchased before 1896 (M 945)
Duchess Julie d'Arenberg (M 945)
Duke Engelbert d'Arenberg (M 945)
Duke Engelbert-Marie d'Arenberg exhibited as the Arenberg Hours in Düsseldorf, 1904 (M 945)
Hans P. Kraus, Bookseller, 1958 (M 945)
Alistair Bradley Martin (Guennol Collection), 1958 (M 945)
Exhibited at the Rijksmuseum as the Guennol Hours, 1958 (M 945)
Hans P. Kraus, Art Dealer, 1970 (M 945)
Morgan Library and Museum, purchased 1970 (M 945)

== Description ==
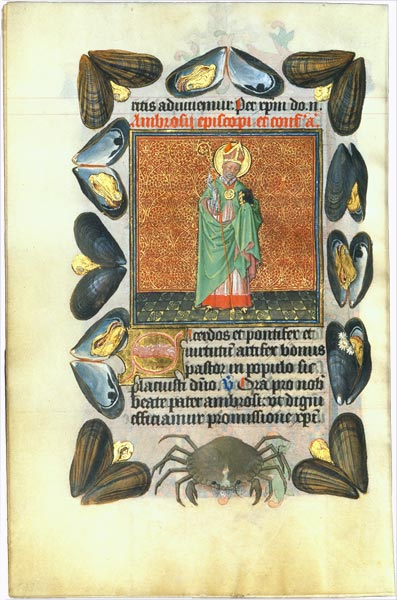
Saint Ambrose with border of mussel-shells

The book is a Gothic manuscript and book of hours, illuminated by the Master of Catherine of Cleves, and at least two assistants, in Utrecht c. 1440. The book is now bound in two volumes:

M 945 = Vellum, 193 leaves, 7 1/2 by 5 1/8 inches (190 mm × 130 mm), with 63 miniatures, bound in 19th-century red velvet.

M 917 = Vellum, 328 leaves, 7 1/2 by 5 1/8 inches (190 mm × 130 mm), with 94 miniatures, in a 19th-century binding, with spine marked Heures de Catherine de Cleves / Martyrologie. There are an estimated 9 to 12 leaves missing, based on the series of saints in the Suffrages. Saint Quirinus, Saint Margaret and two other saints are missing; at least five to eight other leaves are missing, too. The text is Latin in a Gothic script with black and red ink, by a single scribe; there are catchwords and rubricator's notes in other hands.

=== Contents ===
Books of hours were extremely popular in the late medieval times, and by the date of these hours the most common vehicle for lavish illumination. The books were intended for regular use, by lay people, who wished to structure their devotional life. Observing the canonical hours centered upon the recitation, or singing, of a number of psalms, which are accompanied by prayers, specified by the eight hours of the liturgical day.

The core text of a Book of Hours is the Little Office of the Virgin, illustrated by scenes from the Life of the Virgin. This series of hourly prayers were prayed to the Mother of God, who co-mediates and sanctifies the prayers to God. The Penitential Psalms were recited to help one resist temptation of committing any of the Seven Deadly Sins. The prayers in the Office of the Dead were prayed to shorten the time a loved one spent in Purgatory. Supplementary texts were added to celebrate any personal patron, family saint, special circumstances, or a fortuitous event. This standard pattern of daily prayer provided the framework for the artists' efforts.

This book contains:

A Calendar of feast days,
The Little Office of the Blessed Virgin Mary,
The Hours of the Cross,
The Hours of Eternal Wisdom,
The Office for the Dead,
The Seven Penitential Psalms,
Various Litanies and Prayers,
A series of seven Offices for each day, with an accompanying Mass; and
The Suffrages, a Memorial of the Saints.

=== Decoration ===
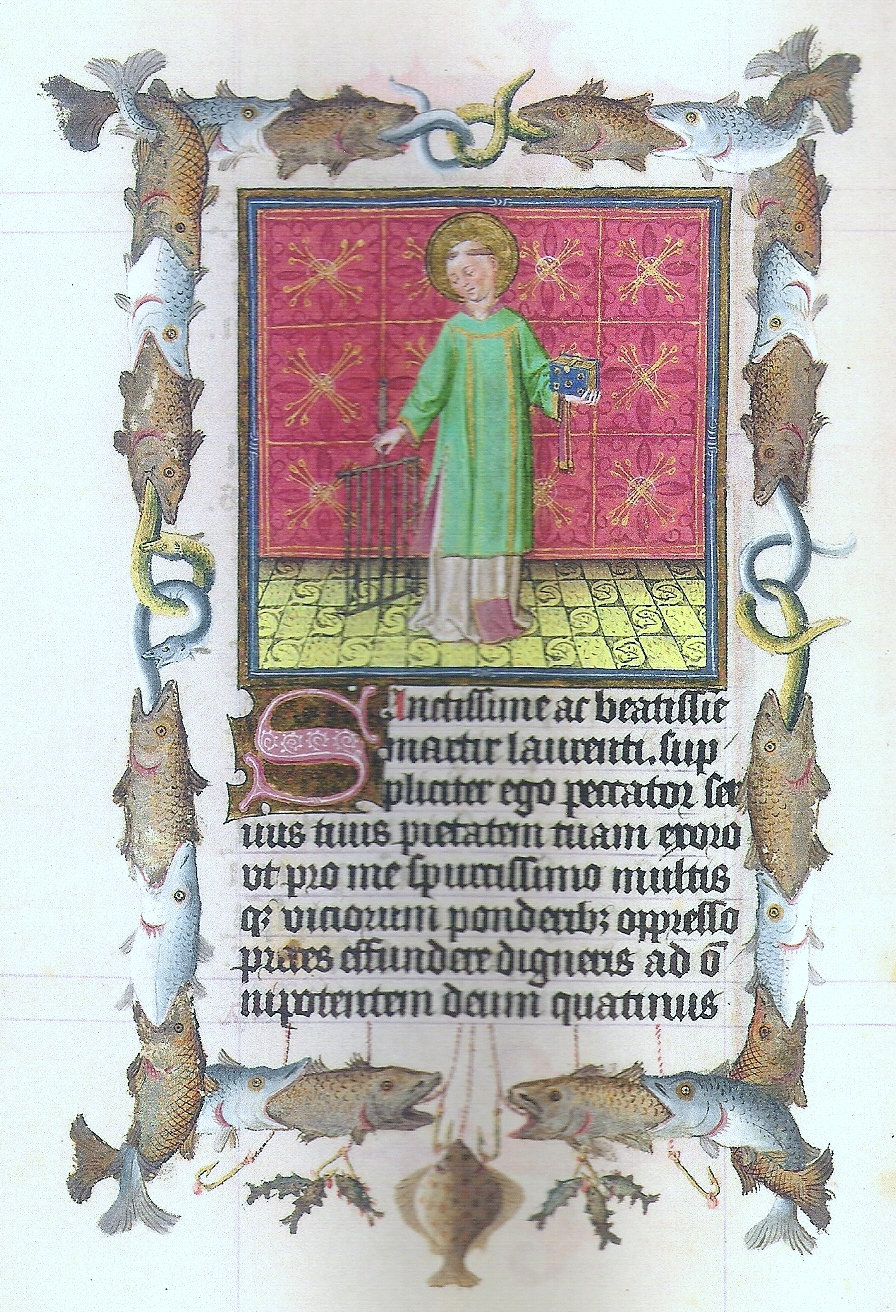
Saint Laurence with a border of fishes.

These volumes come from a period when luxury books of hours for the wealthy were produced for their artistic and decorative effect. The artist chose an unusually wide variety of subject matter for his border illuminations. He decorated his borders with beautiful trompe-l'œil depictions of nature: mussels, fruit, birds, fish, and more. The Master also depicts man-made beauty, such as jewelry, tiles, coins, and furniture. These border decorations would greatly influence the Master of Mary of Burgundy. The Cleves Master was familiar with the details of humble tasks such as milking a cow, selling wine, and baking bread. In spite of the humble occupations depicted in the miniatures and borders, the luxurious details of wealth and elegance dominate the miniatures, to emphasize that this book was made for an aristocratic client. Ingenious theological links between the subjects of the main images and the objects in the borders have been suggested by some scholars, though many of these are not generally accepted.

The Cleves Master's originality is in the trompe-l'œil effects, and in the still life borders. For example, a border of pretzels and wafers encircles Saint Bartholomew, mussels enclose Saint Ambrose, and a rosary frames the Adoration of the Magi. Meiss observed that these pages are constructed so that the reader views the border through a magnifying glass and the miniature through a telescope. The Hours uses framing as a means to encourage viewers to think of themselves as participants with God in creating sacred time. The human figure appears flexible and articulate. The Master handles distance by graduated scale and diminishing clarity. The artist's increasing skill in depicting these realistic features can be traced from the start to the finish of this book.

As a whole, the Cleves Master's decorations concentrate on themes of late medieval theology and piety: the Trinity, Christ, the Cross, the Virgin, the Saints, death, salvation aswell as eternal life. The standard pattern of these devotional prayers provided the framework for the Cleves Master's efforts. The challenge to the artists of his day was to apply their utmost skill in devising pictures fully compliant with religious conventions and the expectations of their noble clients.

=== Reproductions ===
In 1964, the Morgan Library produced an 83-page catalogue, The Book of Hours of Catherine of Cleves, for the Cleves Hours exhibit held at the Library. Both the cloth and paperback editions contained 30 black and white plates, plus 2 color plates, accompanied with commentaries by John Plummer, Curator of Mediaeval Manuscripts at the Pierpont Morgan Library. Frederick B. Adams, Jr, wrote the foreword, which incorporated comments by Harry Bober, L. M. J. Delaissé, Millard Meiss, and Erwin Panofsky.

In 1966, the publisher, George Braziller, produced a full color, partial facsimile. All 157 of the miniatures were reproduced in color with gold. Three text pages of prayers were reproduced in color. The 160 facsimile pages were accompanied with notes and commentaries by John Plummer. This book was issued as a 359-page leather, or leatherette, hardback volume in a slipcase.

A cloth hardback edition was issued in 1975. And, in 1980, the publisher, George Braziller, produced a paperback facsimile of this book.

In 2002, George Braziller published a third edition as a 360-page hardback. All 157 of the miniatures and three text pages were reproduced in color with gold. Plummer includes a new foreword, along with the 1966 edition Introduction and commentaries, accompanying each facsimile page.

In conjunction with a 2010 exhibition of the manuscript, the Morgan Library prepared a complete digital facsimile of the miniatures and any facing text pages.

== Use ==
The Hours of the Virgin are those for use of the Augustinian canons of the Windesheim chapter. The Office of the Dead is also that for Windesheim use, which is the same as for Utrecht.

The Hours of Catherine of Cleves is still relevant today as a devotional text. Karlfried Froehlich, Princeton Theological Seminary, makes a statement about the modern usage of books of hours:

In their imaginative use of traditional iconography the artists put us in touch with a wealth of theological tradition that had developed over centuries and had marked with its symbols the meditative road into the depth dimension. Behind the pictures in these volumes we meet not only the theology of an individual Christian but also a theology expressive of the collective witness of many generations who drew their strength from the contemplation of the realities to which their symbols pointed. There is nothing that could prevent a miniature from the Hours of Catherine of Cleves from becoming an effective help of Christian meditation today.

== See also ==
- Canonical hours
- List of illuminated manuscripts
- History of miniature (illuminated manuscript)
