= Catherine of Cleves (1417–1479) =

Duchess of Guelders (lived 1417 to 1479)

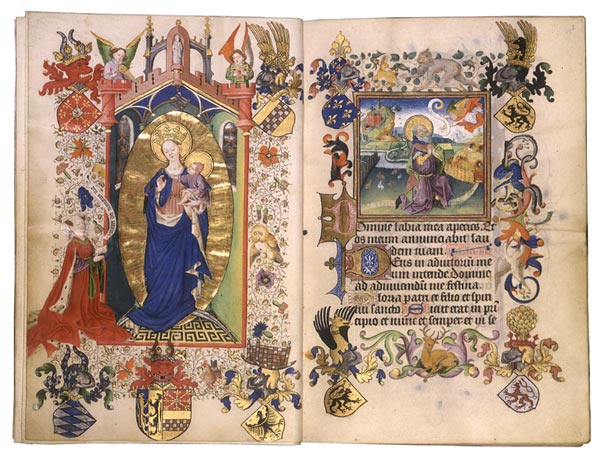
- Catherine of Cleves kneels before the Virgin and Child. Her arms, with those of her husband, Duke Arnold of Guelders, are in the bottom center; the arms of her ancestors are in each corner.

Duchess consort of Guelders
- Tenure: 26 January 1430 - 23 February 1473
- Born: 25 May 1417; Schwanenburg Castle in Cleves
- Died: 10 February 1479 (aged 61); Lobith
- Noble family: La Marck
- Spouse: Arnold, Duke of Guelders
- Issue: Mary, Queen of Scotland; William; Margaret, Countess of Palatine-Simmern; Adolf, Duke of Guelders; Catherine
- Father: Adolph I, Duke of Cleves
- Mother: Marie of Burgundy

Catherine of Cleves (25 May 1417 – 10 February 1479) was Duchess of Guelders by marriage to Arnold, Duke of Guelders. She acted as regent of Guelders during the absence of her spouse in 1450. The Hours of Catherine of Cleves was commissioned for her.

== Life ==
Catherine was the daughter of Adolph I, Duke of Cleves and Marie of Burgundy. She was a niece of Philip the Good.

=== Duchess and regent ===
Catherine lived with her parents until 1431, despite already having been married the year before. She had close ties with Philip of Burgundy, who was mistrusted by her husband. Catherine had her daughter Mary raised at the Burgundian court. When her husband punished Driel, he lost support in his duchy. Catherine acted as intermediate between her husband and the Estates of the realm. In 1450, Duke Arnold went on a pilgrimage to Rome and Palestine. During his absence, Catherine acted as regent.

She supported her son Adolf when he took over power from his father. Charles, Duke of Burgundy had Adolf taken capture in 1470, when he proved an unreliable ally to Burgundy. Catherine spent her last years in Lobith, where she died in 1479.

== Book of Hours ==
The Hours of Catherine of Cleves was commissioned for her when she married Arnold, Duke of Guelders, on 26 January 1430. It shows her lineage, as well as herself in prayer. The hours had been lost for four hundred years before resurfacing in 1856. It is one of the most richly decorated books of its kind that is preserved.

== Issue ==
Catherine and Arnold had:

- Mary (c. 1431–1463), who became Queen of Scotland by marriage to James II
- William (born c. 1434), died young
- Margaret (c. 1436–1486, Simmern), married on 16 August 1454 to Frederick I, Count of Palatine-Simmern.
- Adolf (1438–1477)
- Catherine (1439 – 1496), Regent of Guelders in 1477–1481.

== Sources ==
- Blockmans, Wim; Prevenier, Walter (1999). Peters, Edward (ed.). The Low Countries Under Burgundian Rule, 1369-1530. Translated by Fackelman, Elizabeth. University of Pennsylvania Press.
- Downie, Fiona (2006). She is But a Woman: Queenship in Scotland, 1424-1463. John Donald.
- Kloek, Els (2013). 1001 Vrouwen uit de Nederlandse Geschiedenis. Vantilt.
- Marshall, Rosalind K. (2003). Scottish Queens, 1034-1714. Tuckwell Press.
