= Capture of Roxburgh (1314) =

1314 Siege of Roxburgh Castle during the First War of Scottish Independence

- Part of Wars of Scottish Independence
Date	19 February 1314
Location	Roxburgh Castle, Scotland 55.596°N 2.457°W
Result	Scottish victory

Belligerents
Kingdom of Scotland	Kingdom of England

Commanders and leaders
Lord James Douglas; Sir Walter Stewart	William Fiennes (WIA)

Strength
Unknown, inferior to the English	2,000+

Casualties and losses
Light	Heavy

The Capture of Roxburgh was a siege that took place in 1314, which was a major conflict in the First War of Scottish Independence. This siege was a prelude to the Battle of Bannockburn.

== Siege ==
Sir James Douglas, Lord of Douglas, after his victory over the Clan MacDougall, had capturied several castles from the English. Roxburgh Castle was on impregnable ground, and was well guarded. Douglas and Walter Stewart, 6th High Steward of Scotland, disguised their few men as cows, so the garrison was unaware of their presence. They then used ladders to climb to the top and took the castle by surprise. They inflicted heavy casualties on the garrison, including wounding their leader in the face with an arrow.

== Aftermath ==
The Lanercost Chronicle records that "all that beautiful castle the Scots pulled down to the ground, like the other castles that they had succeeded in capturing, lest the English should ever again rule the land by holding the castles."
