= Arnold, Duke of Guelders =

Duke of Guelders (1410–1473)

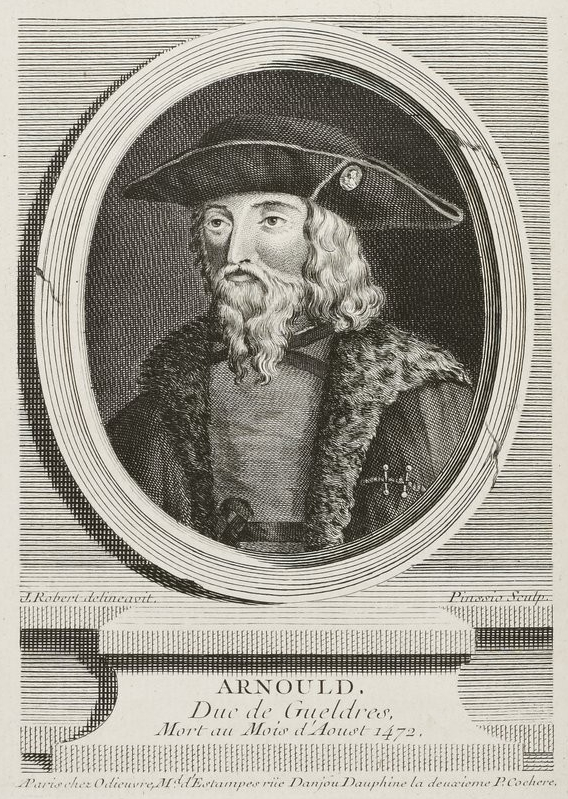
- Arnold, Duke of Guelders
- Born: 10 July 1410; Egmond-Binnen
- Died: 23 February 1473 (aged 62); Grave
- Noble family: Egmont
- Spouse: Catherine of Cleves
- Issue: Mary, Queen of Scotland; William; Margaret, Countess of Palatine-Simmern; Adolf, Duke of Guelders; Catherine
- Father: John II, Count of Egmond
- Mother: Maria van Arkel

Arnold of Egmond (14 July 1410 – 23 February 1473) was Duke of Guelders, Count of Zutphen.

== Life ==
Arnold was born in Egmond-Binnen, North Holland, the son of John II of Egmond and Maria van Arkel. On 11 July 1423, Arnold, still a boy, succeeded Duke Reinald IV. Arnold was the grandson of Reinald's sister, Johanna. Although the Emperor Sigismund had invested the Duke of Berg with the duchy of Gelders, Arnold retained the confidence of the Estates by enlarging their privileges, and enjoyed the support of Duke Philip of Burgundy. Arnold was betrothed, and afterwards united in marriage to Catherine of Cleves, a niece of Philip of Burgundy. Subsequently, however, Duke Arnold fell out with his ally as to the succession to the see of Utrecht, whereupon Philip joined with the four chief towns of Guelders in the successful attempt of Arnold's son Adolf to substitute his own for his father's authority. Arnold gave up his claim on Jülich only after his defeat in 1444 by Gerhard VII, Duke of Jülich-Berg.

Arnold was accused of participating in sodomy in 1466 after a man named Gerhart von Ryswick, a citizen of Arnhem, gave a confession where he said that he had sex with Arnold. Ryswick would later tell the court that he only made the claim because Arnold's son Adolf had tortured him.

Egmond coat of arms

When Charles the Bold became Duke of Burgundy in 1467, after rejecting a compromise, Adolph was thrown into prison. Arnold, against the will of the towns and the law of the land, pledged his duchy to Charles for 300,000 Rhenish florins (1471). Upon Arnold's death two years later at Grave, Charles took possession of the duchy, starting a series of wars that would last more than 70 years.

== Family and children ==
Arnold was married in Cleves on 26 January 1430 to Catherine of Cleves (1417–1479), daughter of Adolph IV, Duke of Cleves and Marie of Burgundy. Their children were:

- Mary (c. 1431–1463), married 3 July 1449 to James II, King of Scots
- William (born c. 1434), died young
- Margaret (c. 1436–1486, Simmern), married on 16 August 1454 to Frederick I, Count of Palatine-Simmern
- Adolf (1438–1477)
- Catherine (1439–1496), Regent of Geldern in 1477–1481. She was married possibly secretly in 1464 to Louis de Bourbon, Bishop of Liège.

== Ancestors ==
Ancestors of Arnold, Duke of Guelders

8. John I, Lord of Egmond
4. Arnold I, Lord of Egmond
9. Guida of IJsselstein
2. John II, Count of Egmond
10. Frederick VII of Leningen
5. Jolanthe of Leiningen
11. Jolanthe of Jülich-Bergheim
1. Arnold, Duke of Guelders
12. Otto, Lord of Arkel
6. John V, Lord of Arkel
13. Elisabeth of Bar-Pierrepont
3. Maria van Arkel
14. William II, Duke of Jülich
7. Joanna of Jülich
15. Maria of Guelders

== Sources ==
- Jansen, S. (2002). The Monstrous Regiment of Women: Female Rulers in Early Modern Europe. Palgrave Macmillan US. pp. 262–. ISBN 978-0-230-60211-3.
- Künker, Fritz Rudolf (2007). Künker Auktion 121 - The De Wit Collection of Medieval Coins. GmbH & Co. KG Numismatischer Verlag Künker. pp. 320–. GGKEY:XA7PPK6ZHF7.
- Nijsten, Gerard (2004). In the Shadow of Burgundy: The Court of Guelders in the Late Middle Ages. Cambridge University Press.
- Stein, Robert (2017). Magnanimous Dukes and Rising States: The Unification of the Burgundian. Oxford University Press.
- Vaughan, Richard (2004). Philip the Good: The Apogee of Burgundy. Vol. 3. The Boydell Press.

Arnold, Duke of Guelders House of Egmont Born: 14 July 1410 Died: 23 February 1473
| Preceded by Reinoud IV | Duke of Guelders; 1423–1465 | Succeeded by Adolf |
| Preceded by Adolf | Duke of Guelders; 1471–1473 | Succeeded by Charles the Bold |
