= Mary of Guelders =

Queen consort and regent of Scotland

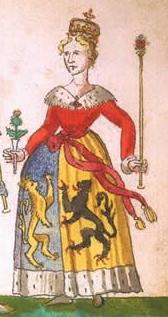
- Mary of Guelders depicted in the 1591 Seton Armorial

Queen consort of Scots
- Tenure: 3 July 1449 – 3 August 1460

Queen regent of Scotland
- Regency: 1460 – 1463
- Monarch: James III
- Born: 17 January 1433; Grave, Duchy of Brabant, Holy Roman Empire
- Died: 1 December 1463 (aged 30); Roxburgh Castle, Roxburghshire, Scotland
- Burial: 1463; Trinity College Kirk; 1848; Holyrood Abbey, Scotland
- Spouse: James II of Scotland (m. 1449; died 1460)
- Issue: James III; Alexander, Duke of Albany; David, Earl of Moray; John, Earl of Mar and Garioch; Margaret Stewart; Mary, Countess of Arran
- House: Egmond
- Father: Arnold, Duke of Gelderland
- Mother: Catherine of Cleves

Mary of Guelders (Dutch: Maria van Gelre, Scottish Gaelic: Màiri à Guelders; 17 January 1433 – 1 December 1463) was Queen of Scots by marriage to King James II. She ruled as regent of Scotland from 1460 to 1463.

== Early life ==
She was the daughter of Arnold, Duke of Guelders, and Catherine of Cleves. She was a great-niece of Philip the Good, Duke of Burgundy.

Philip and his wife Isabella of Portugal at first planned to have Mary betrothed to Charles, Count of Maine, but her father could not pay the dowry. Mary stayed on at the Burgundian court, where Isabella frequently paid for her expenses. Mary attended Isabella's daughter-in-law Catherine of France, while she herself was attended upon by ten people.

The duke and duchess then started negotiations for a Scottish marriage. Philip promised to pay her dowry, while Isabella paid for her trousseau. William Crichton came to the Burgundian court to escort her back to Scotland. A tournament was held at Bruges to celebrate her departure; the victor was Jacques de Lalaing, a Burgundian knight.

== Queen of Scotland ==
Arms of Mary as queen consort of Scotland

Mary landed in Scotland in June 1449. Her arrival was described by Mathieu d'Escouchy. She first visited the Isle of May and the shrine of St Adrian. Then she came to Leith and rested at the Convent of St Anthony. Both nobles and the common people came to see her as she made her way to Holyrood Abbey in Edinburgh. Mary married King James II of Scotland at Holyrood Abbey on 3 July 1449. A sumptuous banquet was given, while the Scottish king gave her several presents. Immediately after the marriage ceremony, she was dressed in purple robes and crowned queen by Abbot Patrick. It had been agreed that any sons they might have would have no right to the duchy of Guelders.

Queen Mary was granted several castles and the income from many lands from James, which made her independently wealthy. In May 1454, she was present at the siege of Blackness Castle, and when it resulted in the victory of the king, he gave it to her as a gift. She made several donations to charity, such as when she founded a hospital just outside Edinburgh for the indigent; and to religion, such as when she benefited the Franciscan friars in Scotland.

== Regency ==
After her husband's death, Mary ruled as regent for their son James III of Scotland until her own death three years later. Mary was drawn into the Wars of the Roses taking place in England at this time. She appointed Bishop James Kennedy as her chief advisor; their companionship was described as well-functioning despite the fact that the bishop favoured an alliance with the Lancastrians, while Mary at first wanted to continue playing off the warring parties in England against each other.

While Mary was still mourning the death of her husband, the English queen of the House of Lancaster, Margaret of Anjou, fled north across the border seeking refuge from the Yorkists. Mary sympathetically aided Margaret and took Edward of Westminster into her household to keep them out of Yorkist hands. Mary's dealings with Margaret were mainly to provide aid to the deposed queen. Mary gave a number of Scottish troops to help Margaret and the Lancastrian cause. Mary and Margaret also organised a betrothal between Margaret's son, Edward, and Mary's daughter Margaret in 1461. In return for her support, Mary asked for the town of Berwick on the Anglo-Scottish border, which Margaret was willing to give up. Relations between the two women deteriorated, however, with the increasingly friendly alliance between King Edward IV of England and Duke Philip of Burgundy. Any support by Mary for Margaret, Edward IV's enemy, threatened the alliance that Philip wanted with Edward IV against King Louis XI of France.

Edward IV tried to put a stop to Mary's support of Margaret by proposing marriage to the widowed queen, which Mary rejected. Mary's uncle, Duke Philip, pressured her to call off the betrothal of her daughter and Margaret's son, to Margaret's disappointment. In 1462, she paid the Lancastrian royals to leave Scotland and made peace with Edward IV. She also hinted at the possibility of a marriage between herself and the new English king. Mary, reportedly, had several affairs during her period as regent, notably one with the Lord Hailes, although some recent historians have cast doubt on these claims.

Mary went ahead with James II's plan to build a castle on land at Ravenscraig, designed to withstand the use of artillery, and lived in it while it was under construction until her death.

=== Trinity College Church ===
Mary founded Trinity College Church c. 1460 in memory of her husband. The church, located in the area now known as Edinburgh's Old Town, was demolished in 1848 to make way for Waverley station, although it was partially reconstructed on a different site in 1870 under the name Trinity Apse.

Upon her death, Mary was at first interred at Trinity College Church, but her body was moved to Holyrood Abbey in Edinburgh when discovered in 1848. David Laing, a member of the Society of Antiquaries of Scotland, stated that the move was made on 15 July that year. However, Laing raised the possibility that the skeleton discovered at Trinity College Church and assumed to be the queen was not, in fact, Mary of Guelders. He argued that another female skeleton, discovered in a more prominent location in the church, and more likely to have been the site of a royal burial, could well have been Mary. That person was also reinterred at Holyrood. The first reinterment was in the royal vault; the second, near the entrance. Daniel Wilson disputed Laing's theories and maintained that the first reburial was indeed that of Mary of Guelders. Wilson noted that since Mary died before the building of the collegiate church was finished, her obsequies had been held at Brechin Cathedral before the burial at Trinity College Church.

== Issue ==
James and Mary had seven children together:

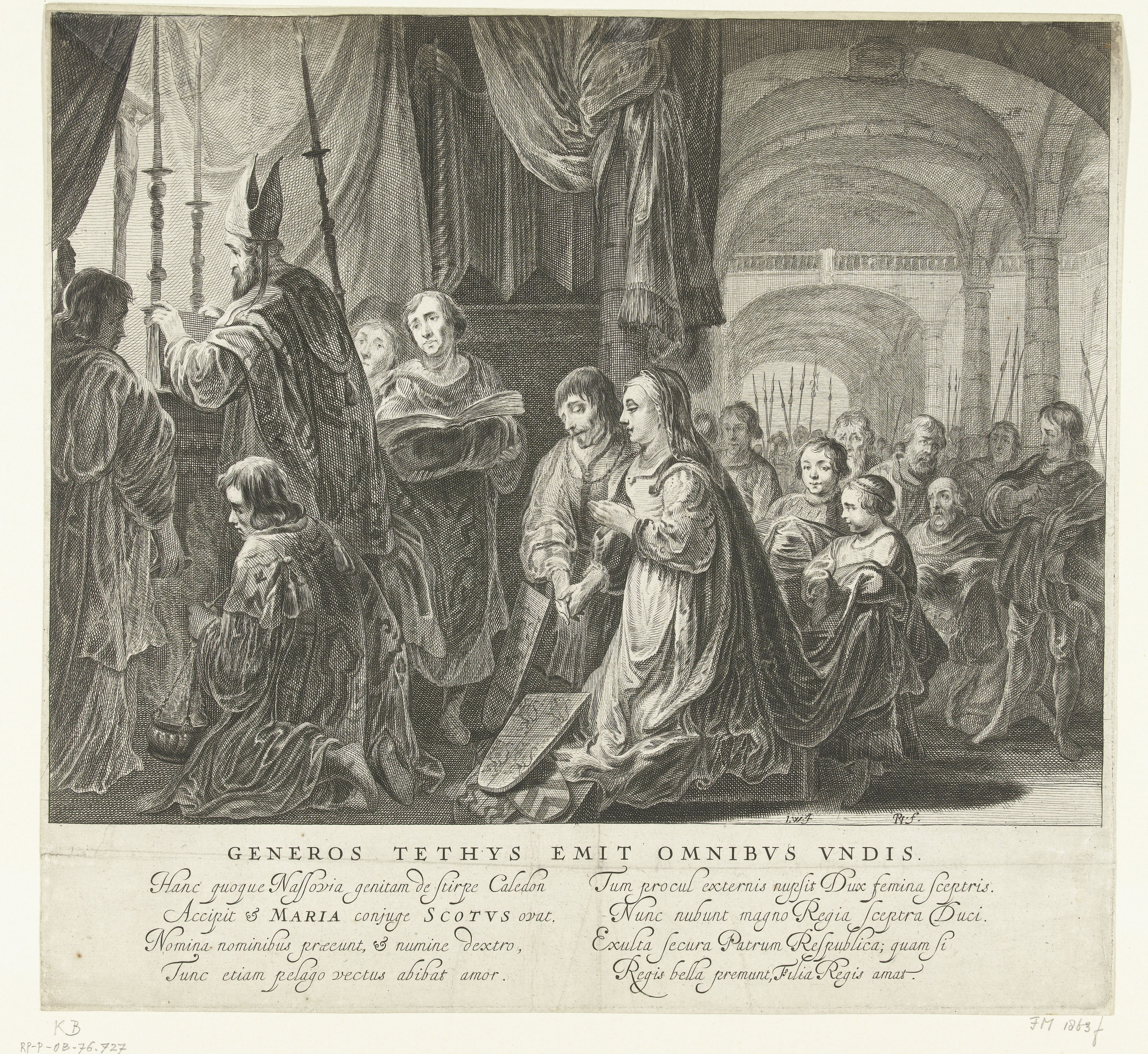
17th-century engraving of the wedding of James II and Mary of Guelders

- A premature child, born on 19 May 1450; it lived for only six hours.
- Mary (1451 - c. May 1488), married firstly Thomas Boyd, Earl of Arran, and had issue. Their marriage was annulled in c. 1473, after which she married James Hamilton, 1st Lord Hamilton, and had issue.
- James III (May 1452 - 11 June 1488), who succeeded his father as King of Scots.
- Alexander, Duke of Albany (1454 - 1485)
- David, Earl of Moray (1455/56 - before 18 July 1457)
- John, Earl of Mar (1457 - 1479/80)
- Margaret (c. 1460 - c. 1503), had illegitimate issue by William Crichton, 3rd Lord Crichton.

== Sources ==
- Haeger, Knut (1982). Skotsk krönika [A Scottish Chronicle] (in Swedish). Stockholm: Almqvist & Wiksell. ISBN 91-20-06736-4.
- Thomas Finlayson Henderson (1893). "Mary (d.1463)" . In Lee, Sidney (ed.). Dictionary of National Biography. Vol. 36. London: Smith, Elder & Co.
- Marshall, Rosalind Kay (2003). Scottish Queens, 1034–1714. Tuckwell. ISBN 9781862322714.
- Weir, Alison (1995). Lancaster and York: The War of the Roses. London: Jonathan Cape. ISBN 978-0-09-954017-5.
- Wilson, Daniel (1884). "St Ninian's Suburb and the Collegiate Church of the Holy Trinity Founded at Edinburgh by Queen Mary of Gueldres, the Widow of James II in 1462". Proceedings of the Society of Antiquaries of Scotland. New Series. 6: 152.
- Weir, Alison (1996). Britain's Royal Families: The Complete Genealogy. Pimlico. ISBN 0712674 489.
- MacDougall, Norman (2009). James III (Reprinted ed.). John Donald. ISBN 978 1 904607 87 8.
- McGladdery, Christine (2015). James II (Revised ed.). Edinburgh: John Donald. ISBN 978 1 904607 89 2.
- Richard Oram: The Kings and Queens of Scotland
- Timothy Venning: The Kings and Queens of Scotland
- Mike Ashley: British Kings and Queens
- Elizabeth Ewan, Sue Innes and Sian Reynolds: The Biographical Dictionary of Scottish Women

Scottish royalty
Preceded by Joan Beaufort	Queen consort of Scotland; 1449–1460	Succeeded by Margaret of Denmark
