= Mary of Burgundy, Duchess of Cleves =

Mary of Burgundy
- Duchess of Cleves, Countess of Mark
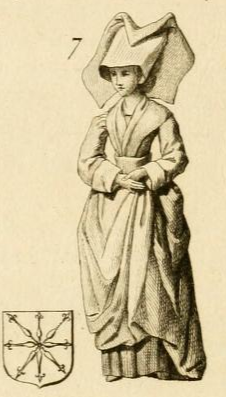
- Born: 1394; Dijon, France
- Died: 1463 (aged 68–69); Monterberg Castle, Kalkar, Cleves
- Spouse: Adolph I, Duke of Cleves
- Issue: Margaret, Duchess of Bavaria, Countess of Württemberg; Catherine, Duchess of Guelders; John I, Duke of Cleves; Elisabeth of Cleves; Agnes, Queen of Navarre; Helen, Duchess of Brunswick-Lüneburg; Adolph of Cleves, Lord of Ravenstein; Marie, Duchess of Orléans
- House: Valois-Burgundy
- Father: John the Fearless
- Mother: Margaret of Bavaria

Mary of Burgundy, Duchess of Cleves (1394 – 1463) was the wife of Adolph I, Duke of Cleves. She co-founded a monastery, with her son John, in Kalkar in 1453.

== Life ==
Born 1394 in Dijon, Mary was the daughter of John the Fearless and Margaret of Bavaria, and the elder sister of Philip the Good. She married Adolph, Count of Mark in May 1406. He was made the 1st Duke of Cleves in 1417. They lived at Wijnendale Castle in West Flanders.

Mary's husband, Adolph of Cleves died in 1448, and their son John I of Cleves succeeded him. Mary retired to Monterberg Castle, near Kalkar. She founded a monastery in Kalkar with her son, John, which was built to house a dozen monks. Construction began in 1453 and was complete by 1457. She died in Cleves in present-day Monterberg, Kalkar in 1463.

== Issue ==
Mary and Adolph had:

- Margaret (23 February 1416 – 20 May 1444), married first William III, Duke of Bavaria on 11 May 1433, second Ulrich V, Count of Württemberg on 29 January 1441
- Catherine of Cleves (25 May 1417 – 10 February 1479); married on 23 July 1423 Arnold, Duke of Guelders
- John I, Duke of Cleves (16 February 1419 – 5 September 1481); married 1456 Elizabeth of Nevers
- Elisabeth of Cleves (1 October 1420 – March 1488); married on 15 July 1434 Henry XXVI of Schwarzburg-Blankenburg
- Agnes of Cleves (1422 – 6 April 1446); married on 30 September 1439 Charles IV, King of Navarre
- Helen of Cleves (1423–1471); married on 12 February 1436 Henry "the Peaceful", Duke of Brunswick-Lüneburg
- Adolph of Cleves, Lord of Ravenstein (1425–1492); married on 13 May 1453 Beatrice of Portugal (1435–1462), daughter of Peter, Duke of Coimbra
- Marie of Cleves (1426–1487); married on 27 November 1440 Charles, Duke of Orléans

== Sources ==
- Blockmans, Wim; Prevenier, Walter (2010). Peters, Edward (ed.). The Promised Lands: The Low Countries Under Burgundian Rule, 1369-1530. Translated by Fackelmans, Lizabeth. University of Pennsylvania Press. ISBN 9780812200706.
- Hand, Joni M. (2017). Women, Manuscripts and Identity in Northern Europe, 1350-1550. Routledge. ISBN 9781351536530.
- Vaughan, Richard (2002). Philip the Good. The Boydell Press. ISBN 978-0-85115-917-1.
- Vaughan, Richard (2009). John the Fearless. The Boydell Press. ISBN 978 0 85115916 4.
