= The Adventures of Quentin Durward =

1955 UK-US historical film by Richard Thorpe

- Theatrical release poster
- Directed by: Richard Thorpe
- Screenplay by: Robert Ardrey; George Froeschel
- Based on: Quentin Durward; 1823 novel by Sir Walter Scott
- Produced by: Pandro S. Berman
- Starring: Robert Taylor; Kay Kendall; Robert Morley
- Cinematography: Christopher Challis
- Edited by: Ernest Walter
- Music by: Bronislau Kaper
- Production company: Metro-Goldwyn-Mayer
- Distributed by: Loew's, Inc.
- Release dates: 1 March 1956 (London); 23 November 1955 (USA)
- Running time: 101 minutes
- Country: United Kingdom
- Language: English
- Budget: $2,470,000
- Box office: $2,175,000

The Adventures of Quentin Durward, known also as Quentin Durward, is a 1955 British historical film released by MGM. It was directed by Richard Thorpe and produced by Pandro S. Berman. The screenplay was by Robert Ardrey, adapted by George Froeschel from the 1823 novel Quentin Durward by Sir Walter Scott.

It was the third in an unofficial trilogy made by the same director and producer and starring Robert Taylor. The first two were Ivanhoe (1952) and Knights of the Round Table (1953). All three were made at MGM's British Studios in Borehamwood, near London. Unlike the earlier films, it was scored by Bronislau Kaper rather than Miklós Rózsa, who was busy on other projects at the time.

It was the first big-budget film for the British actress Kay Kendall. Other actors included Robert Morley and George Cole.

== Plot ==
In 1465, honorable but penniless Scottish knight Quentin Durward agrees to go to France to find out if the beautiful young heiress, Isabelle, Countess of Marcroy, would be a suitable wife for his aged uncle. The marriage has been arranged by Charles, Duke of Burgundy, for his rich ward to cement an alliance with Scotland. She wants nothing to do with it, so she runs away and seeks the protection of Charles' great rival, Louis XI, King of France. Quentin pursues and manages to foil an attempted robbery by brigands under the command of Count William de La Marck, though Isabelle continues on her way unaware of her protector's identity.

Nearing the court of King Louis, Quentin tries, but fails, to save the life of a gypsy. However, the dead man's brother, Hayraddin, is grateful for his efforts. Louis, who had ordered the man's hanging as a Burgundian spy, and distrusts honest men, such as Quentin, orders him to leave France. The Scotsman is not easily deterred. He sneaks into the heavily guarded castle and awakens Louis in his bed with a dagger at his throat. Louis is impressed and enlists Quentin in his service.

Upon the unexpected arrival of Count Phillip de Creville, a Burgundian ambassador seeking Isabelle, Louis orders Quentin to guard her and to keep her presence secret. During the time they spend together, she and Quentin begin to fall in love.

Having lied about Isabelle's being there, Louis commands her to depart. She tells him that she will seek sanctuary with an old friend, the Bishop of Liege. Louis concocts a plan to have De la Marck kidnap and forcibly marry Isabelle to keep her strategically important lands out of Burgundian hands. He has Hayraddin, who is a spy in his employ, take the information and a large bribe to De la Marck. Louis provides Isabelle with a detailed itinerary (the better for De la Marck to find her). He also lends her a few guards, including Quentin, so that when they are killed, it will divert any suspicion away from him. Hayraddin is also sent as a guide. However, when he discovers that Quentin is to be one of the victims, he warns the Scotsman. The three manage to escape the trap and reach Liège, though Quentin is wounded.

When he has recovered, he finally tells Isabelle of his obligation to his uncle, which prevents him from courting her himself, and leaves. De la Marck attacks the castle, captures Isabelle, and kills the bishop when he refuses to marry them. Hearing the sounds of battle, Quentin rescues his love. He slays De la Marck in an unusual duel in a burning bell tower, in which they swing from the ropes used to ring the church bells.

Meanwhile, the Duke of Burgundy arrests Louis when he comes to continue peace negotiations, accusing him of orchestrating the murder of the bishop. Quentin arrives and exonerates the King, providing as proof De la Marck's severed head. Out of gratitude (and in France's best interests), Louis tricks Charles into letting Isabelle decide whom she will marry. Quentin has received news that his uncle has died, so he too is free to follow his heart.

== Cast ==
- Robert Taylor as Quentin Durward
- Kay Kendall as Isabelle, Countess of Marcroy
- Robert Morley as King Louis XI
- George Cole as Hayraddin
- Alec Clunes as Charles the Bold, Duke of Burgundy
- Duncan Lamont as Count William de La Marck
- Laya Raki as Gypsy dancer
- Marius Goring as Count Philip De Creville
- Wilfrid Hyde-White as Master Oliver, the king's trusted barber and confidant
- Eric Pohlmann as Gluckmeister
- Harcourt Williams as Louis de Bourbon, Bishop of Liege
- Michael Goodliffe as Count De Dunois
- John Carson as Duke of Orleans
- Nicholas Hannen as Cardinal Balus
- Moultrie Kelsall as Lord Malcolm, the Scottish ambassador
- Frank Tickle as Petit-André
- Bill Shine as Trois-Eschelles
- Ernest Thesiger as Lord Crawford, Quentin's uncle
- Arthur Howard as the injured monk at Liege (uncredited)

== Production ==
In 1951, MGM filmed an adaptation of Ivanhoe by Sir Walter Scott in Britain, starring Robert Taylor and produced by Pandro S. Berman. The studio was so pleased with the results that even before the film was released they were looking at a follow-up for Taylor, and Quentin Durward was suggested. The project became a certainty when Ivanhoe became one of the biggest hits of Taylor's career. He was scheduled to make the film after completing Knights of the Round Table.

Producer Berman thought that audiences would accept romance if it was presented "at face value, on a pure basis, as a clean unsmutty kind of thing and without sexy overtones. I haven't got any rules to lay down for successful pictures, but one fact is sure today - people want something besides words, beside conversation pieces from the screen. Once in a while you have a 'Streetcar', in which all the actors talk their fool heads off, and it's a hit anyway, but for myself I'm committed to pictures with action and scenic and pictorial scope."

A number of female stars were mentioned as possibles to appear opposite Taylor, including Deborah Kerr, Elizabeth Taylor, Ann Blyth and Grace Kelly. For a time, Robert Taylor's busy schedule saw Stewart Granger emerge as a contender to replace him but Taylor ended up playing the part. Grace Kelly turned down the film and Kay Kendall was given the part.

== Filming locations ==
Most of the filming locations are:

- England: Bodiam Castle, East Sussex (Lord Crawford's castle)
- France:
  - Château de Chambord, Loir-et-Cher
  - Château de Chenonceau, Indre-et-Loire
  - Château de Maintenon, Eure-et-Loir

== Reception ==
=== Critical ===
Bosley Crowther, in The New York Times, thought the film was poor. He wrote: "It lacks for excitement when...the intrigues of France's Louis XI and the Duke of Burgundy are placed upon the screen in such lengthy and ponderous complexity that they exhaust and befuddle the mind...The times when this heavily stuffed contrivance does have a tendency to move are when Mr. Taylor is working to get himself out of jams...And the big terminal fight...swinging on bell-ropes...is pretty good".

=== Box office ===
In contrast with Ivanhoe and Knights of the Round Table, the film did not perform well at the box office. According to MGM records, it made $658,000 in the U.S. and Canada and $1,517,000 in other markets, resulting in a $1,226,000 loss.

== See also ==
- List of British films of 1955
- Quentin Durward, a 1970 French-German television series
