= Charles, Duke of Bourbon =

Charles, Duke of Bourbon can refer to:

- Charles I, Duke of Bourbon
- Charles II, Duke of Bourbon
- Charles III, Duke of Bourbon
