= Jean de Bourbon =

Jean de Bourbon may refer to:

- Jean de Bourbon, Count of Enghien (1528–1557, French prince du sang and military commander
- Jean de Bourbon (monk) (c. 1413–1485), French monk and prelate
- John I, Duke of Bourbon (1381–1434)
- John II, Duke of Bourbon (1426–1488)
