= Agnes of Burgundy, Duchess of Bourbon =

Agnes of Burgundy
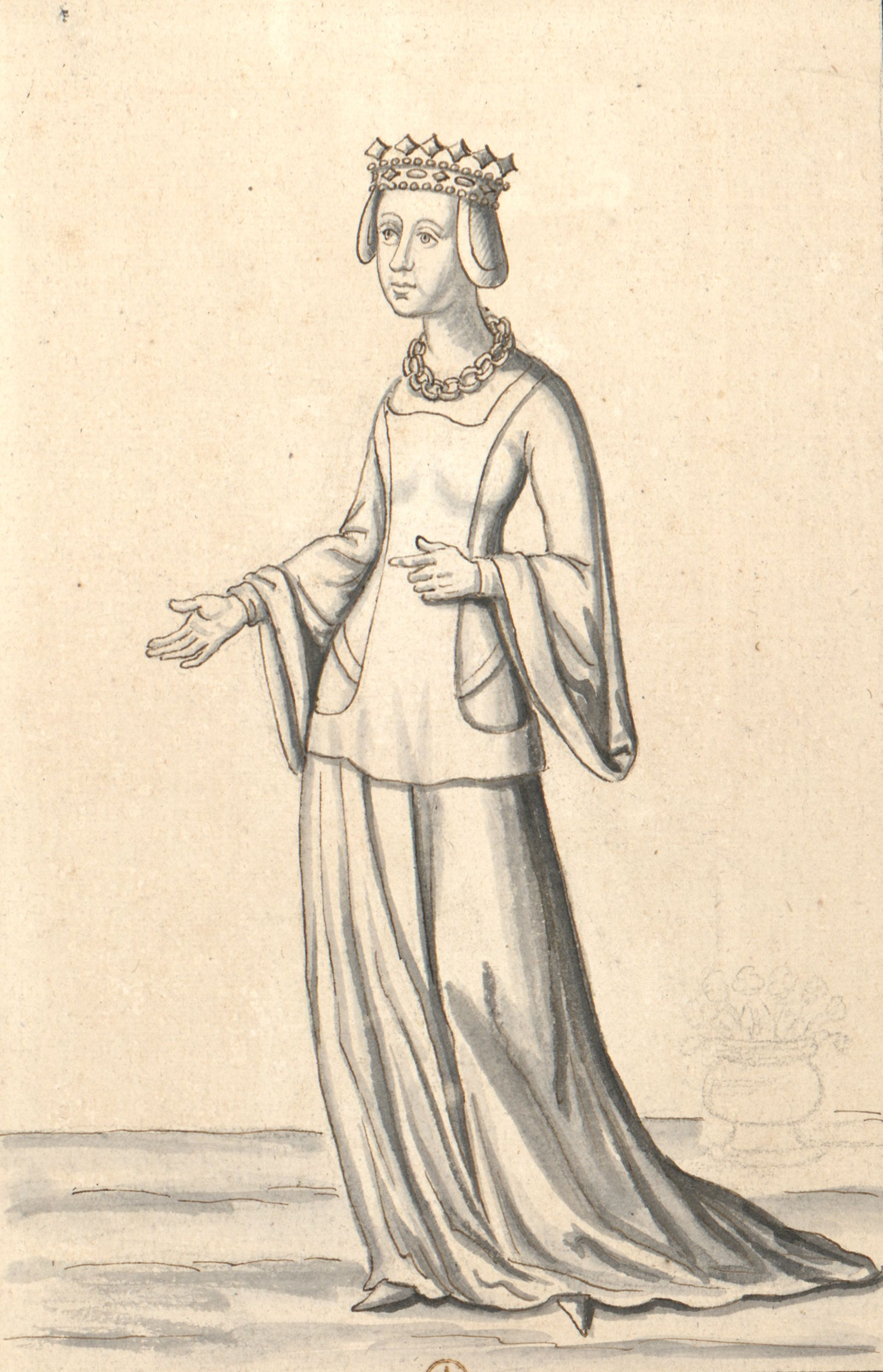

Duchess consort of Bourbon
- Tenure: 1434–1456
- Born: 1407
- Died: 1 December 1476 (aged 68–69)
- Spouse: Charles I, Duke of Bourbon
- Issue: John II, Duke of Bourbon; Mary, Duchess of Lorraine; Philip, Lord of Beaujeu; Charles II, Duke of Bourbon; Isabella, Countess of Charolais; Peter II, Duke of Bourbon; Louis, Prince-Bishop of Liège; Margaret, Duchess of Savoy; Catherine, Duchess of Guelders; Joanna, Princess of Orange; Jacques, Count of Montpensier
- House: Valois-Burgundy
- Father: John the Fearless
- Mother: Margaret of Bavaria

Agnes of Burgundy (1407 – 1 December 1476), duchess of Bourbon (Bourbonnais) and Auvergne, countess of Clermont, was the daughter of John the Fearless (1371–1419) and Margaret of Bavaria. Her maternal grandparents were Albert I, Duke of Bavaria and Margaret of Brieg. Her paternal grandparents were Philip the Bold and Margaret III, Countess of Flanders.

== Life ==
Agnes spent much of her youth in the company of her mother, Margaret of Bavaria, and sisters Margaret of Burgundy and Anne of Burgundy. She was well educated and a life-long reader, involved in politics until the last years of her life.

== Marriage and issue ==
Agnes married Charles I, Duke of Bourbon. They had:

- John of Bourbon (1426–1488), Duke of Bourbon
- Marie de Bourbon (1428–1448), married in 1444 John II, Duke of Lorraine
- Philip of Bourbon (1430–1440), Lord of Beaujeu
- Charles of Bourbon (Château de Moulins 1434–1488, Lyon), Cardinal and Archbishop of Lyon and Duke of Bourbon
- Isabella of Bourbon (1436–1465), married Charles, Duke of Burgundy.
- Peter of Bourbon, (1438–1503, Château de Moulins), Duke of Bourbon
- Louis of Bourbon (1438 – 30 August 1482, murdered), Prince-Bishop of Liège
- Margaret of Bourbon (5 February 1439 – 1483, Château du Pont-Ains), married in Moulins on 6 April 1472 Philip II, Duke of Savoy, parents of Louise of Savoy
- Catherine of Bourbon (Liège, 1440 – 21 May 1469, Nijmegen), married on 28 December 1463 in Bruges Adolf II, Duke of Guelders
- Joanna of Bourbon (1442–1493, Brussels), married in Brussels in 1467 John II of Chalon, Prince of Orange
- Jacques of Bourbon (1445–1468, Bruges), Count of Montpensier. Unmarried
