= Jean de Bourbon (monk) =

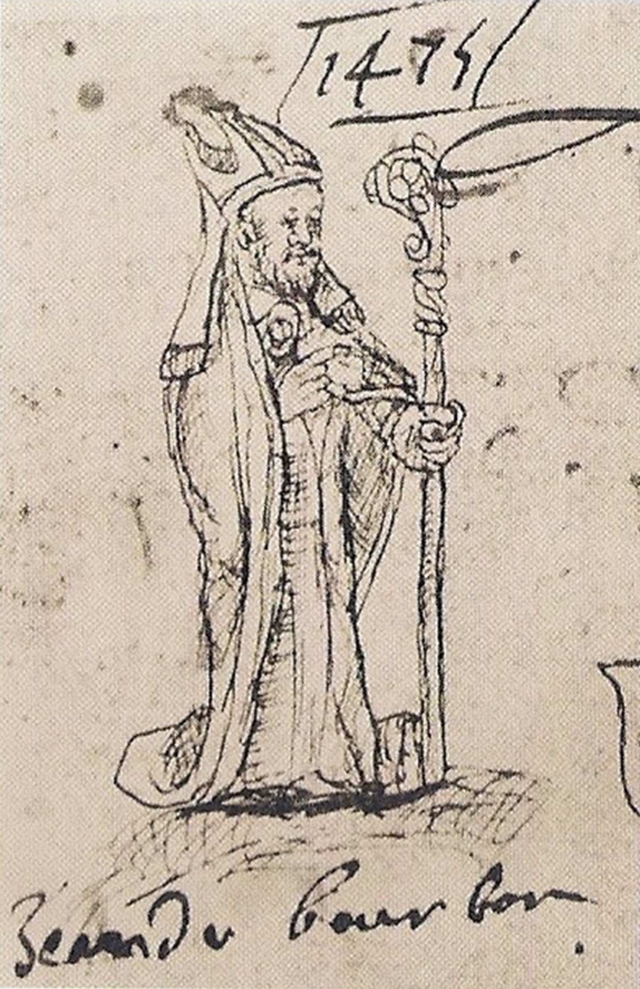
Jean de Bourbon

Jean de Bourbon (c. 1413 – 2 December 1485) was a French monk and prelate. An illegitimate son of John I, Duke of Bourbon, he was prior of Saint Rambert and Montverdun, abbot of Saint-André Abbey and Cluny Abbey, bishop of Le Puy-en-Velay, administrator of the Archdiocese of Lyon, and lieutenant general of the Languedoc.

== Biographie ==
He was born in the Château de Bouthéon in the Forez. After studying in Avignon he entered Saint-André Abbey in Villeneuve-lès-Avignon, becoming its abbot. In 1443 he was elected bishop of Puy, rebuilding its episcopal palace, restoring the episcopal castle in Monistrol, building a keep at Yssingeaux and rebuilding the church at Lavoûte-Chilhac.

He was elected archbishop of Lyon in 1444 by its chapter, but Charles VII of France opposed the election, as he did not want the post filled by a brother of Charles of Bourbon (one of the participants in 1441-1442's Praguerie). Jean thus resigned in favour of his young nephew Charles), then aged 11. The king and pope refused to approve this election and nominated Geoffroy de Vassali, then archbishop of Vienne. On Geoffroy's death in 1446, Charles of Bourbon made Jean administrator of the diocese of Lyon from 1449 to 1466.

He was also commendatory abbot of Cluny from 1456 to 1480 and remained its permanent administrator until his death. He was known for restoring and embellishing its abbey, particularly with two new buildings - an abbot's palace (now housing the Ochier Museum and a private chapel Some authors state that he and not his successor abbot Jacques d'Amboise was the founder of the Hôtel de Cluny in Paris.

In 1465 he took part in the League of the Public Good alongside his nephew John II. John II made him lieutenant general of Languedoc in 1466, though Louis XI dismissed him from that post in 1474, so John II instead made him lieutenant general of Forez. He resumed his post as lieutenant general of Languedoc in 1484.

In 1468 his nephew Charles, as abbot of the abbey of Île-Barbe, made him prior of Saint-Rambert-en-Forez, halfway between Cluny and Puy-en-Velay. From then on Jean made that priory his main residence, allowing him to combine his roles as bishop in the Velay, abbot in Burgundy and lieutenant general of Forez. Around 1482 he succeeded his nephew Renaud de Bourbon as prior of Montverdun on the latter's death. He died at Saint-Rambert and was buried in the chapel named after him in Cluny.

== Bibliography (in French) ==
- Pierre Caillet, « Jean de Bourbon, évêque du Puy, abbé de Cluny, lieutenant général en Languedoc et Forez, 1413 (?)-1485 », Publication de la société des études locales, Section de la Haute-Loire, volume 9, 1929.
- Pierre Caillet, « La décadence de l'Ordre de Cluny au xve siècle et la tentative de réforme de l'abbé Jean de Bourbon (1456-1485) », Bibliothèque de l'école des chartes, volume 89, 1928, p. 183-234
- Jean-Marie de La Mure, « La vie du très vertueux prélat Jean de Bourbon, évêque du Puy, abbé de Cluny, prieur de Saint Rambert en Forez et seigneur d'Argental audit pays, fils naturel dudit duc Jean Ier du nom », in Histoire des Ducs de Bourbons et des Comtes du Forez, volume II, 1675, 1860-1869, p. 155-163.
- Brigitte Maurice-Chabard, « Le mécénat de Jean de Bourbon », in Neil Stratford (ed.), Cluny, 910 - 2010. Onze siècles de rayonnement, Paris, Editions du Patrimoine CMN, 2010, p. 402-411.
- Guy de Valous (1949). Jean de Bourbon : évêque du Puy, lieutenant-général de Languedoc et de Forez, abbé de Cluny, serviteur et adversaire de Louis XI (?1413-1485). Éditions de Fontenelle. p. 155-163..
