= Jean-Baptiste Ochier =

Jean-Baptiste-Louis-Marie Ochier (9 March 1785 - 27 February 1860) was a French medical doctor, numismatist and archaeologist.

== Life ==
He was born in Azé, After studying medicine in Montpellier and gaining his diploma in 1807, he spent some years in Paris before settling in Cluny in 1810, where he bought Jean de Bourbon's abbot's palace, the pavillon De Guise and the park surrounding them. On 15 April 1817 he married Sabine Aucaigne in Cluny. Passionate about archaeology, Ochier collected remains from Cluny Abbey and displayed them in the orangery, the Tour Fabry and the cloister gallery.

He was made a corresponding scholar of the Académie de Mâcon on 16 January 1810 and made its titular from 25 April 1852 until his death. In 1844 he was made curator of Cluny library and in 1850 the Société française pour la conservation des monuments historiques met in his home. He died in Cluny and afterwards his widow followed his wishes by donating his property in the town to be the Ochier Museum.
