= Nicholas I of Lorraine =

Duke of Lorraine (1448-1473)

Nicholas I
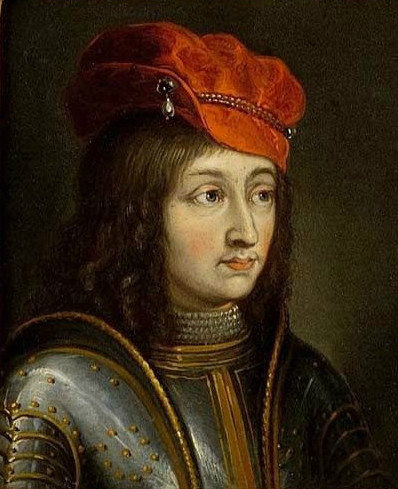
- Portrait by an unknown artist, 17th century

Duke of Lorraine
- Reign: 6 December 1470 – 27 July 1473
- Predecessor: John II
- Successor: René II

Duke of Calabria
- Reign: 6 December 1470 – 27 July 1473
- Predecessor: John II
- Successor: Charles IV of Anjou

Prince of Girona (Claimant)
- Reign: 6 December 1470 – 27 July 1473
- Predecessor: John II
- Born: July 1448; Nancy
- Died: 27 July 1473 (aged 24–25); Nancy
- Issue: Marguerite
- House: Lorraine
- Father: John II, Duke of Lorraine
- Mother: Marie de Bourbon

Nicholas I of Anjou (July 1448 – 27 July 1473) was Duke of Lorraine from 1470 to his death in 1473. He was the son of John II of Anjou, and Marie de Bourbon, who died in childbirth.

Nicholas was born in Nancy. He succeeded his father in 1470 as Duke of Lorraine, and assumed the titles of Marquis of Pont-à-Mousson, Duke of Calabria, and Prince of Girona, as heir apparent of Bar, Naples, and Aragon respectively.

In 1461 he was engaged to Anne of France, Viscountess of Thouars, and daughter of Louis XI of France. He used her title, but they never married and the engagement was ended by Louis XI in 1471. The following year, Nicholas got engaged to Mary of Burgundy, the only child of Charles the Bold, the Duke of Burgundy, but died before they could marry. He had only one illegitimate daughter, Marguerite, wife of John IV of Chabannes, Count of Dammartin (d. 1503).

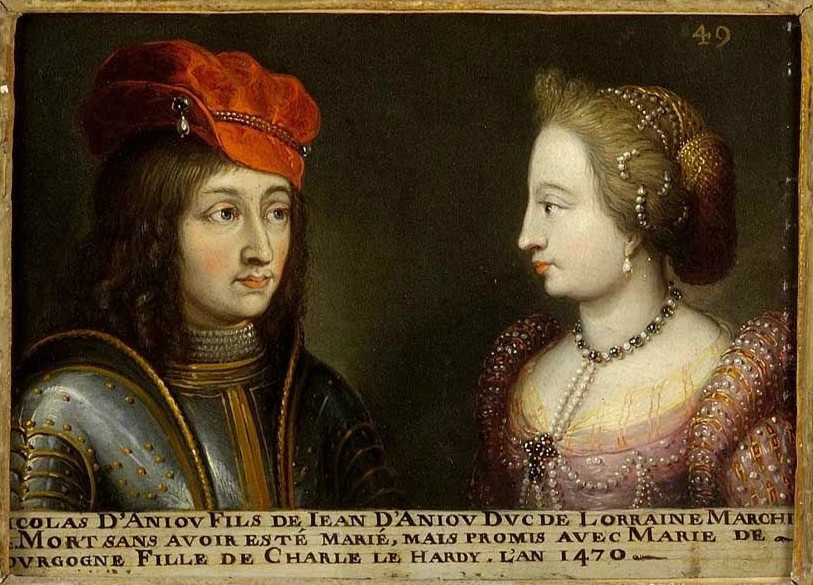
Portraits of Nicholas I and his fiancée Mary of Burgundy, 17th century

Nicholas died suddenly on 27 July 1473 during preparations for a siege of Metz. Some claimed he had been poisoned by agents of King Louis XI of France to prevent his marriage to Mary of Burgundy.

On his death the Duchy of Lorraine went to his aunt Yolande, who immediately passed it to her son, René II.

== See also ==
- Dukes of Lorraine family tree

Preceded by John II	Duke of Lorraine; 1470–1473	Succeeded by René II
Preceded by John II	Duke of Calabria; 1470–1473	Succeeded by Charles IV of Anjou
Preceded by John II	Marquis of Pont-à-Mousson; 1470–1473	Vacant
Spanish royalty
Preceded by John II	— TITULAR — Prince of Girona; 1470–1473	Succeeded by Ferdinand of Aragon
