= Catherine of Bourbon, Duchess of Guelders =

Catherine of Bourbon
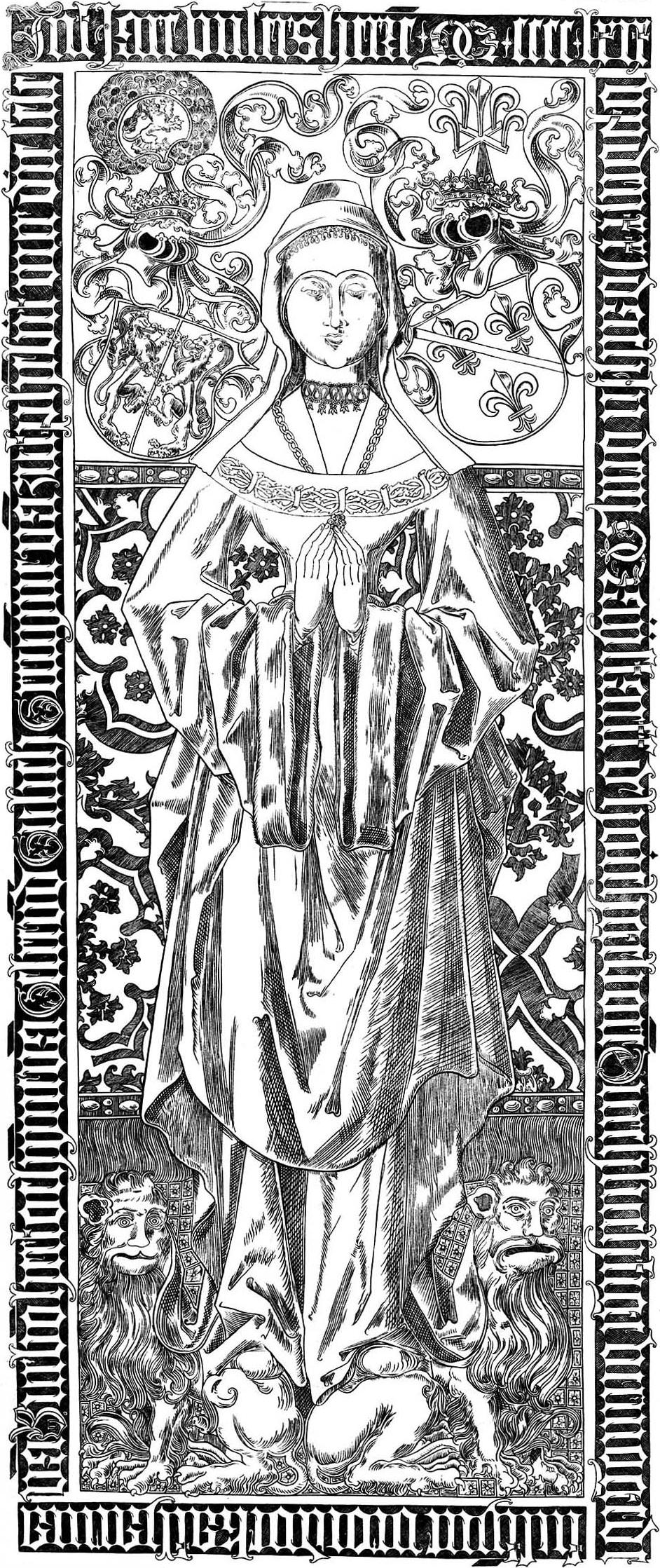
- Tombstone of Catherine of Bourbon in the St. Stephen Church in Nijmegen
- Born: 1440; Liège
- Died: 21 May 1469 (aged 28–29); Nijmegen
- Buried: St. Stephen Church in Nijmegen
- Noble family: Bourbon
- Spouse: Adolf II, Duke of Guelders
- Issue: Charles II, Duke of Guelders; Philippa
- Father: Charles I, Duke of Bourbon
- Mother: Agnes of Burgundy

Catherine of Bourbon (1440 in Liège – 21 May 1469 in Nijmegen) was Duchess of Guelders from 1465-1469 by her marriage to Adolf, Duke of Guelders. She was the daughter of Charles I, Duke of Bourbon and Agnes of Burgundy.

== Marriage and issue ==
Both before and after his accession to the throne Catherine was on several occasions proposed as a bride for Edward IV of England. The marriage negotiations came to nothing, and Edward went on to astonish his own people, and the Courts of Europe, by marrying for love Elizabeth Woodville, the daughter of an obscure knight.

On 28 December 1463 in Bruges, she married Adolf II, Duke of Guelders, who succeeded his father Arnold as Duke of Guelders in 1465. Catherine and Adolf had twin children:

- Philippa (1467-1547), who married in 1485 with René II, Duke of Lorraine (1451-1508)
- Charles (1467-1538), who later became Duke of Guelders (1492–1538)

Catherine died in 1469 and was buried in the St. Stephen Church in Nijmegen.

== Sources ==
- Nijsten, Gerard (2004). In the Shadow of Burgundy: The Court of Guelders in the Late Middle Ages. Cambridge University Press.
- Okerlund, Arlene (2009). Elizabeth: England's Slandered Queen. The History Press.
- Vaughan, Richard (1975). Valois Burgundy. Penguin Books Ltd.
- Vaughan, Richard (2004). Charles the Bold: The Last Valois Duke of Burgundy. The Boydell Press.
