= Marie de Bourbon, Duchess of Calabria =

French noblewoman (1428–1448)

Marie de Bourbon
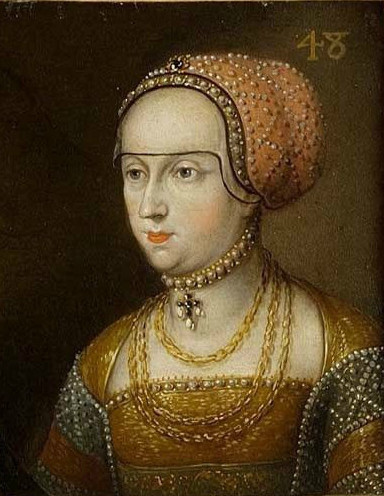
- Anonymous 17th-century portrait

Duchess consort of Calabria
- Tenure: April 1438 - 7 July 1448
- Born: 1428
- Died: 7 July 1448 (aged 19–20)
- Noble family: House of Bourbon
- Spouse: John II, Duke of Lorraine
- Issue: Isabelle; Jean; René; Marie; Nicholas I, Duke of Lorraine
- Father: Charles I, Duke of Bourbon
- Mother: Agnes of Burgundy

Marie de Bourbon (1428 – 7 July 1448) was a French noblewoman. She was the eldest daughter of Charles I, Duke of Bourbon and Agnes of Burgundy, and married John II, who was styled Duke of Calabria and acceded to the title of Duke of Lorraine after Marie's death. Marie was thus styled Duchess of Calabria.

The marriage contract was signed in April 1438, however, the ceremony took place around 1444 when she was older and would be able to consummate the marriage. Marie and John had five children:

1. Isabelle (1445–1445)
2. Jean (1445–1471)
3. René (1446–1446)
4. Marie (1447–1447)
5. Nicholas (1448–1473)

Marie died in childbirth on 7 July, 1448, and was buried at Meurthe-et-Moselle Lorraine, France.

== Sources ==
- Bogdan, Henry (2007). La Lorraine des ducs (in French). Perrin.
- Kekewich, Margaret L. (2008). The Good King: René of Anjou and Fifteenth Century Europe. Palgrave Macmillan.
