= Musée d'Art et d'Archéologie de Cluny =

Coordinates: 46°26′08″N 4°39′27″E

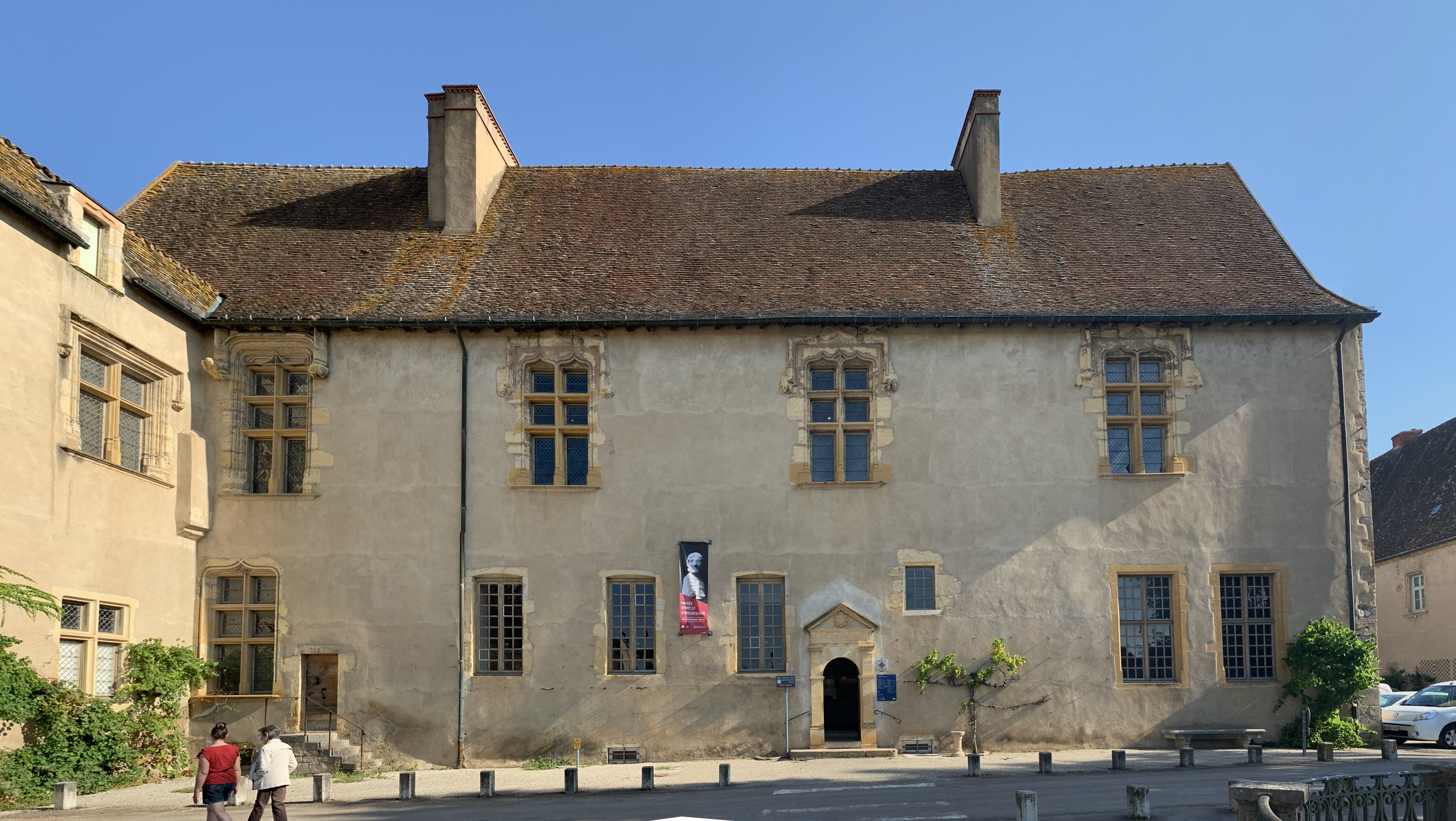
Musée d'art et d'archéologie de Cluny

The Musée d'Art et d'Archéologie de Cluny is a museum in Cluny in Saône-et-Loire. It was previously known as the Ochier Museum (musée Ochier). It is housed in the 15th century abbot's palace built by Jean de Bourbon. A partnership between the town of Cluny and France's Centre des monuments nationaux, it is twinned with Cluny Abbey.

== History ==
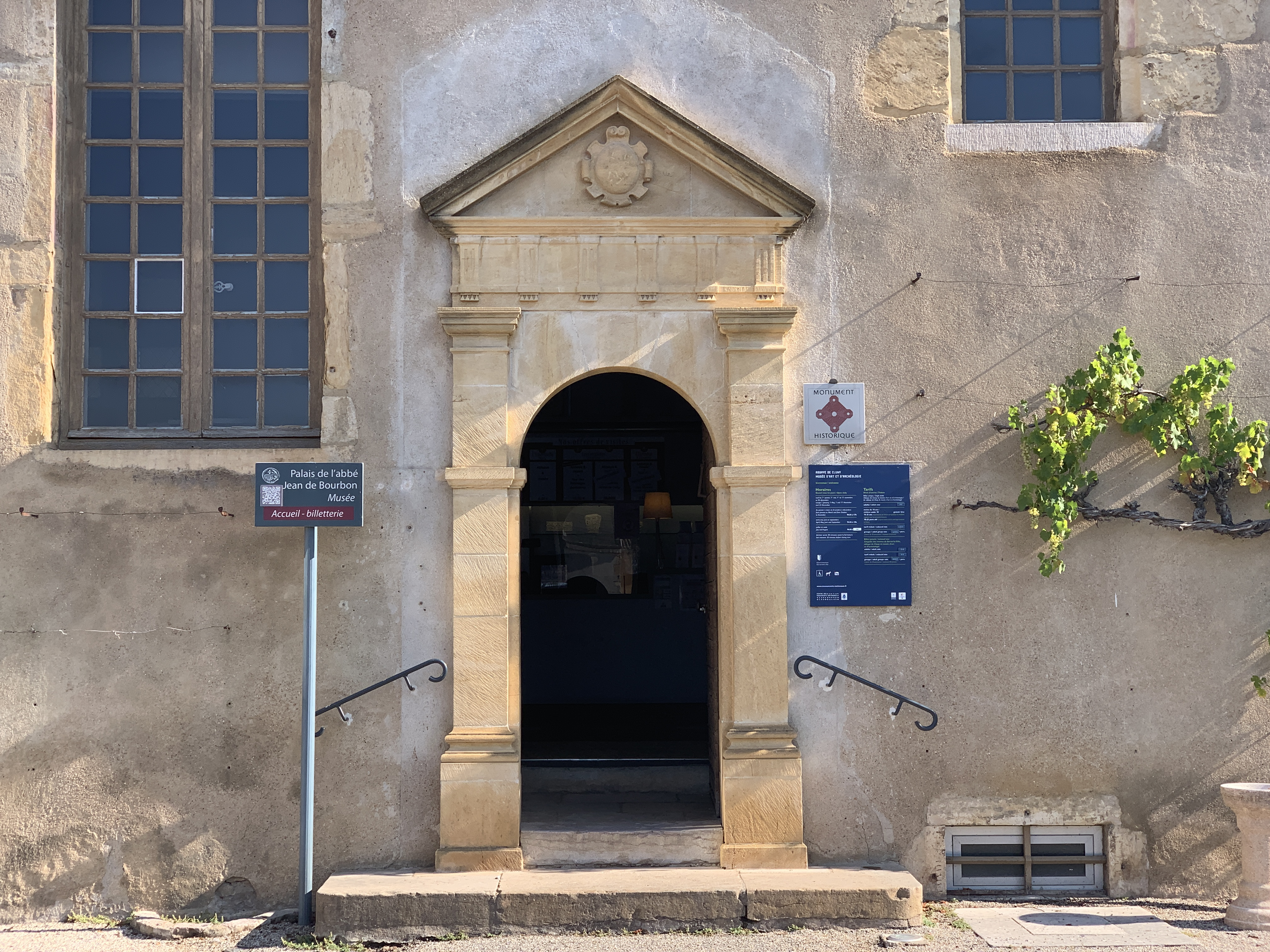
Entrance

The palace was seized by the republican state in 1789 and sold to a private owner, Jean-Baptiste Constance Meunier, on 20 January 1797. Much work was done on it before part of the complex was sold on to Renaud Dumont, one of whose relations, Jean-Baptiste Ochier, inherited the former palace early in the 19th century. Ochier was a physician passionate about archaeology and used the building to house remains from the Cluny III phase of the abbey. On his death his widow left the palace to the town council to use as a museum and a library.

Archivist, palaeographer and author of a thesis on Cluny Abbey, Auguste Pécoul was made curator of the future museum. and added to its collections through donations. The museum opened on 15 August 1866. The collections continued to expand through excavations on the abbey site, particularly those from 1928 to 1950 by Kenneth John Conant, and through building work in the town and donations. It closed for restoration from 1988 to 1992 before reopening on 6 June 1992.

== Collections ==
It houses one of the most important collections of secular and religious Romanesque carved stones, along with a library with over 4,000 works from the abbey covering a period from the 15th to 19th century, excavation records, and some private and municipal archives such as parish registers and plans

The galleries also have a model of the Cluny III phase of the abbey, a partial reconstruction of the tympanum of the 11th century main doorway on a metal frame, and a film with plans, reconstructions and archival images.

== Gallery ==
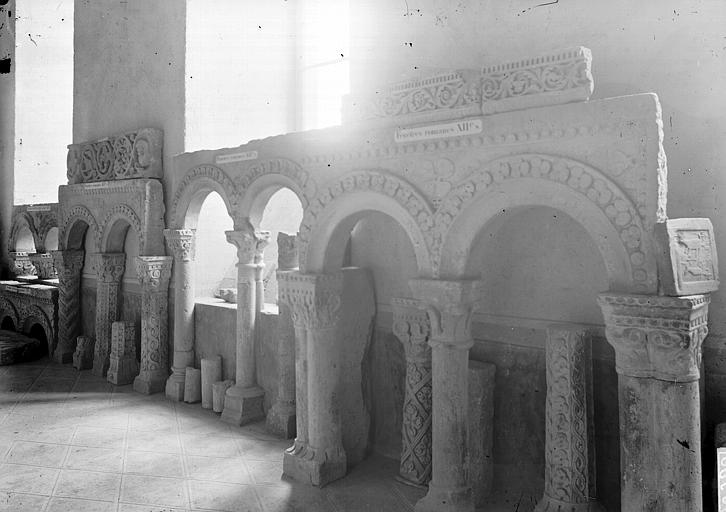
Semi-circular arches

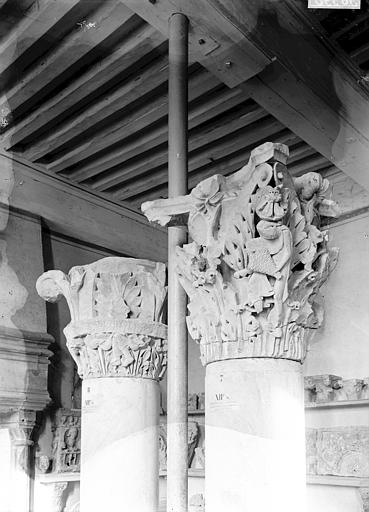
Column capitals

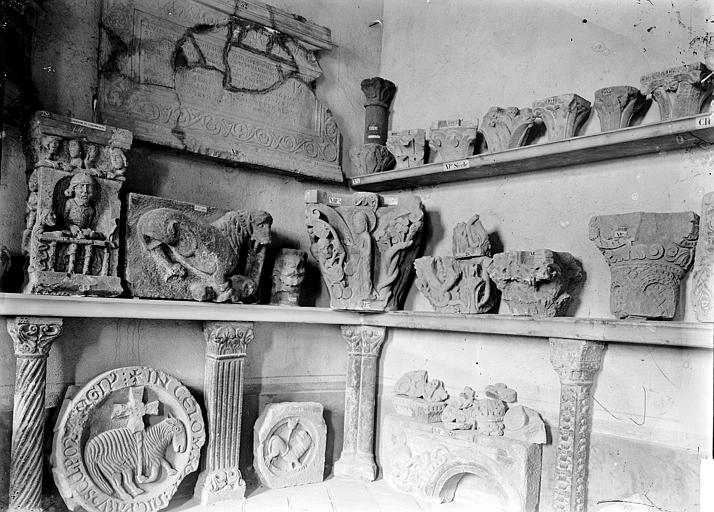
Column capitals and medallions

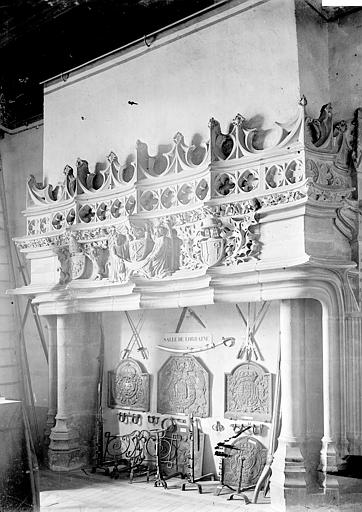
Monumental way

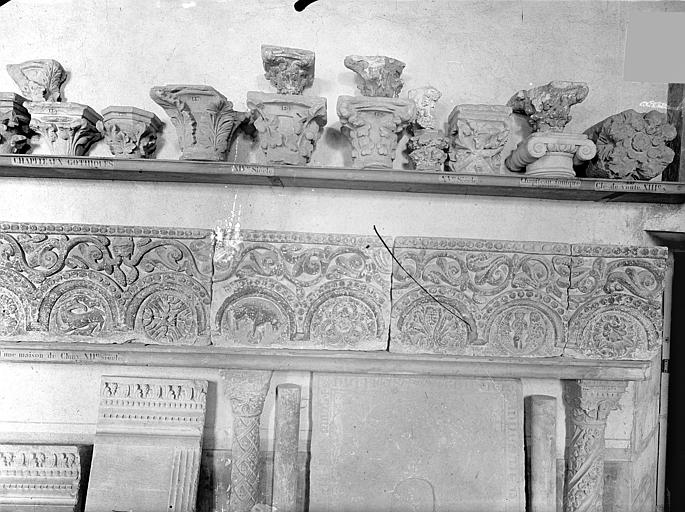
Frieze and column capitals

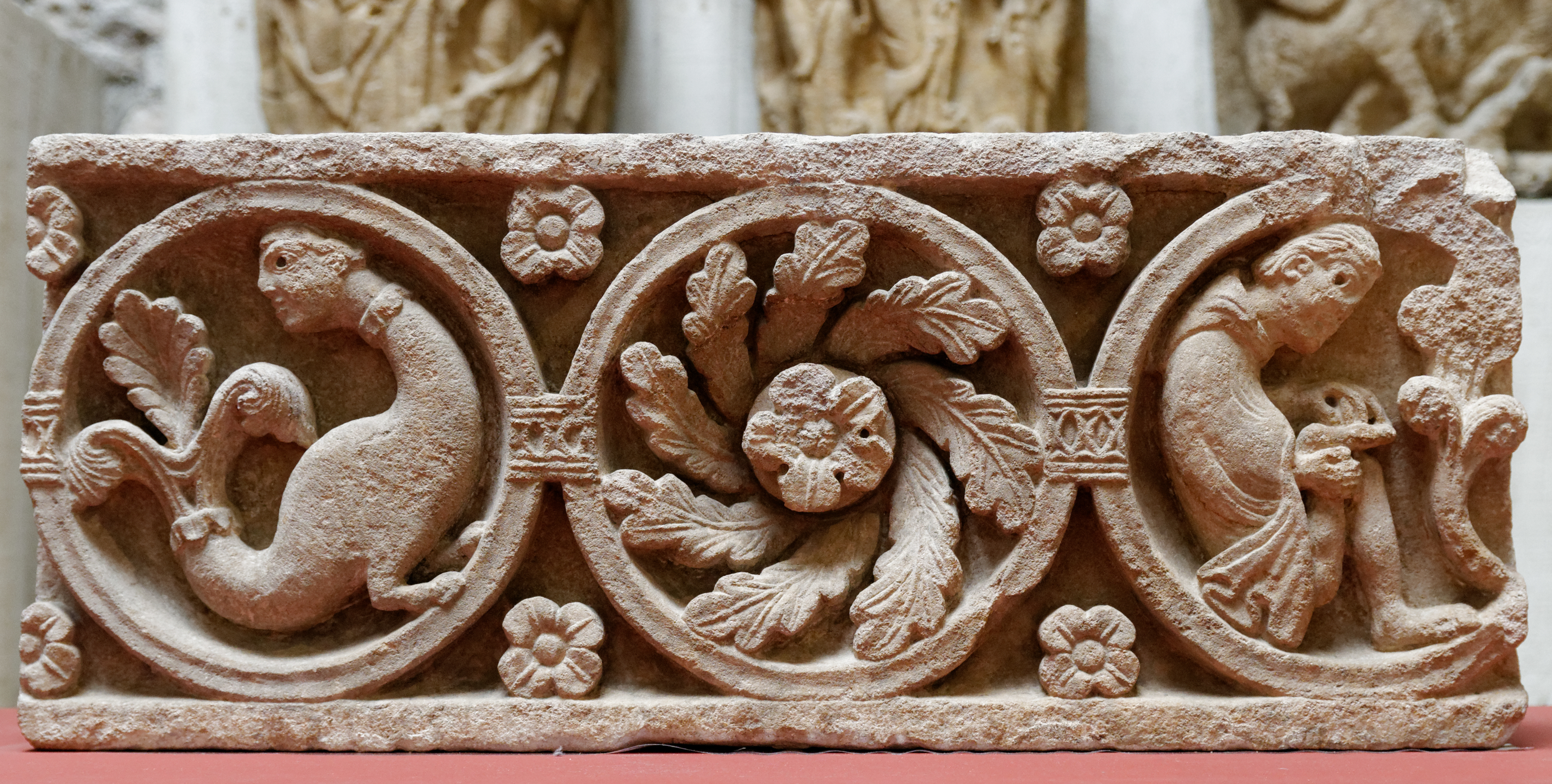
Frieze with medallions
