= John of Heinsberg =

Prince-Bishop of Liège

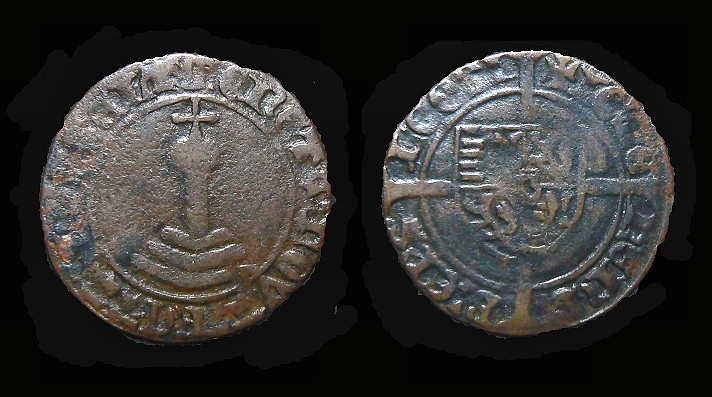

John of Heinsberg (1397–1459), was Prince-Bishop of Liège from 1419 to 1456.

== Life ==
Heinsberg was the son of John II of Loon by his first wife, Margaret of Gennep. When Prince-Bishop John of Walenrode died suddenly in 1419, Heinsberg, despite his young age, was unanimously elected as his successor within three weeks. He was ordained priest on Christmas Eve 1419, consecrated as bishop in Lent 1420, and was invested with secular power as prince-bishop, on behalf of Sigismund, Holy Roman Emperor, in Frankfurt on 21 June 1420. In 1422 he took part in the Bohemian Crusade against the Hussites. In 1424 he revised the method by which aldermen were elected, issuing regulations that remained in force until 1684.

Heinsberg was reputed to have had 65 children, despite being a bishop who should have been celibate.

After a period of conflict between the duchy of Brabant and the prince-bishopric over feudal rights in the county of Namur, the duke of Brabant, Philip the Good, in 1431 imposed a treaty on Heinsberg by which all the claims of Liège were relinquished. Heinsberg took part in the Congress of Arras in 1435 as an ally of Philip the Good.

In 1442 he was present at the imperial coronation of Frederick III, Holy Roman Emperor, at Aachen (a city in his diocese), with an entourage of 250 noblemen. In 1444 he set off on a pilgrimage to the Holy Land, but got no further than Venice before returning home.

In 1456, under pressure from Philip the Good, Heinsberg resigned in favour of Louis de Bourbon. He died at Kuringen, near Hasselt, on 18 October 1459, leaving a reputation for luxury and magnificence.

== Decrees ==
- Statuta dioecesis Leodensis
- Reformatio cleri Leodiensis

Catholic Church titles
Preceded by John of Walenrode	Prince-Bishop of Liège; 1419 – 1456	Succeeded by Louis de Bourbon
