= John II of Lorraine =

Duke of Lorraine (1426-1470)

John II
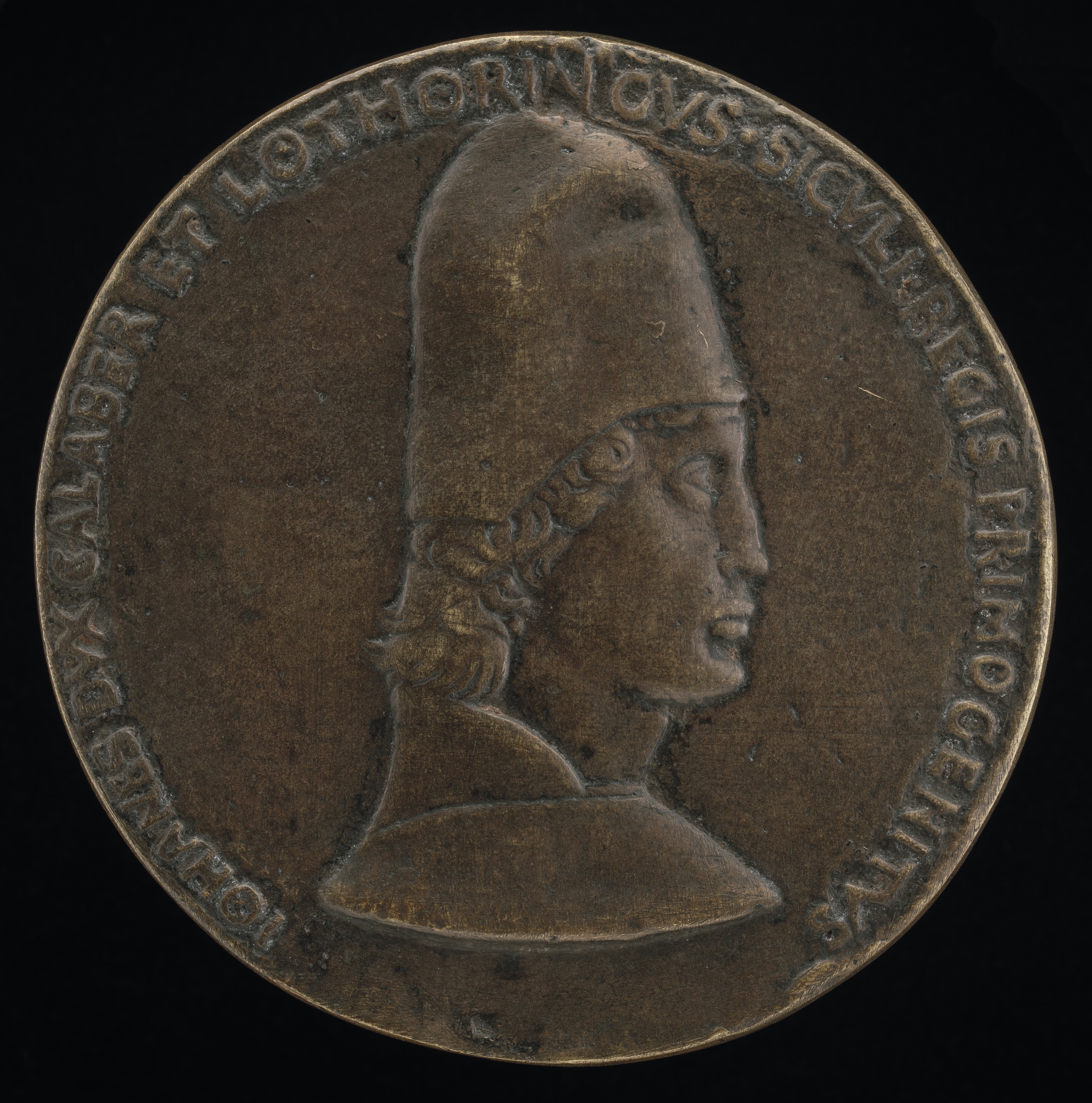
- Medal bearing the portrait of John of Anjou, Francesco Laurana, 1464

Duke of Calabria
- Reign: 1435–1470
- Predecessor: René of Anjou
- Successor: Nicholas I, Duke of Lorraine

Duke of Lorraine
- Reign: 1453–1470
- Predecessor: Isabella and René of Anjou
- Successor: Nicholas I, Duke of Lorraine

Prince of Girona (Claimant)
- Reign: 1466–1470
- Predecessor: Charles, Prince of Viana
- Successor: Ferdinand II of Aragon
- Born: 2 August 1426; Nancy
- Died: 16 December 1470 (aged 44); Barcelona
- Spouse: Marie de Bourbon
- Issue: Isabelle; Jean; René; Marie; Nicholas I, Duke of Lorraine; John; Albert; Jeanne d'Abancourt; Marguerite; Daughter
- House: Anjou
- Father: René, King of Naples
- Mother: Isabella, Duchess of Lorraine

John II of Anjou (Italian: Giovanni d'Angiò) (Nancy, August 2, 1426 – December 16, 1470, Barcelona) was Duke of Lorraine from 1453 to his death. He was the son of René of Anjou and Isabella, Duchess of Lorraine. He was married to Marie de Bourbon, daughter of Charles I, Duke of Bourbon.

== Duchy ==
John inherited the duchy from his mother, Duchess Isabelle, during the life of his father, Duke René of Anjou, also Duke of Lorraine and titular king of Naples. As heir-apparent of Naples, he was styled the Duke of Calabria and spent most of his time engaging in plots for the Angevin recovery of Naples. In 1460, he decisively defeated the king of Naples Ferdinand at Nola, but was unable to prevent others from coming to his aid. He was defeated at battle of Troia in 1462 and at Ischia in 1465. In 1466, the Catalans chose his father as King of Aragon, and he was created Prince of Girona, as heir-apparent. He went into Catalonia to press the family's claims, but died, supposedly by poison, in Barcelona.

== Personal ==
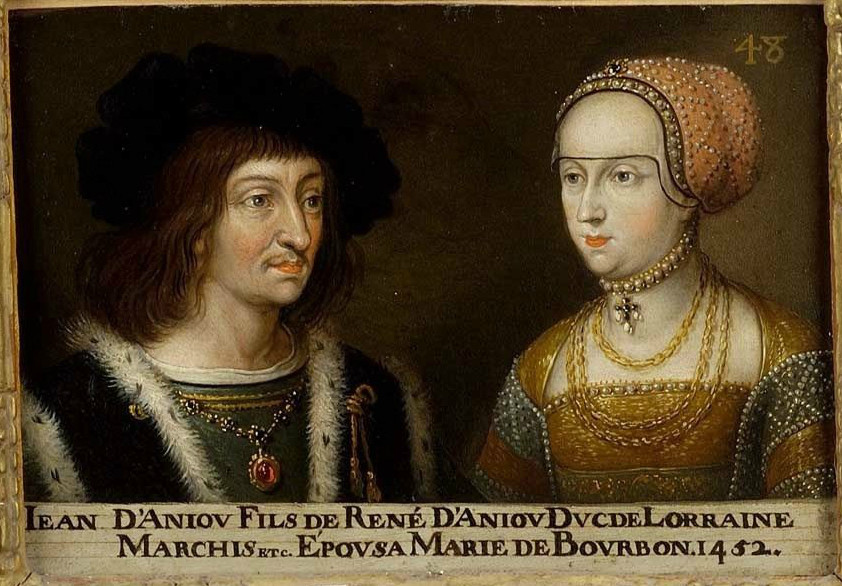
Marie and her husband John

In 1444, he married Marie de Bourbon (1428–1448), daughter of Charles I, Duke of Bourbon and Agnes of Burgundy, Duchess of Bourbon (and granddaughter to John the Fearless, and niece to Philip the Good, both Dukes of Burgundy and enemies and allies to her father). Marie was from the House of Bourbon and was the only Duchess consort of Lorraine from the reign of Valois-Anjou. The marriage contract was signed in April 1437, however, the ceremony took place around 1444 when she was older and would be able to consummate the marriage.

Marie and John had the following issue:

1. Isabelle (1445–1445)
2. Jean (1445–1471),
3. René (1446–1446)
4. Marie (1447–1447)
5. Nicholas (1448–1473)

Marie died giving birth to her last and only surviving child Nicholas; she died on July 7, 1448, and was buried at Meurthe-et-Moselle Lorraine, France.

John also had several illegitimate children:

- John (d. 1504), Count of Briey, married Nancy St. Georges
- Albert, seigneur d'Essey
- Jeanne d'Abancourt, married Achille, Bastard of Beauveu
- a daughter named Marguerite
- another daughter, married Jean d'Ecosse

== See also ==
- Dukes of Lorraine family tree

== Sources ==
- Kekewich, Margaret L. (2008). The Good King: René of Anjou and Fifteenth Century Europe. Palgrave Macmillan.

John II of Lorraine House of Valois-Anjou Born: 1425 Died: 16 December 1470
Regnal titles
Preceded by Isabella and René I	Duke of Lorraine; 1453–1470	Succeeded by Nicholas I
Preceded by René I	Duke of Calabria titular from 1442; 1435–1470	Succeeded by Nicholas I
Preceded by René I	Marquis of Pont-à-Mousson; 1444–1470	Succeeded by Nicholas I
Spanish royalty
Preceded by Charles of Viana	— TITULAR — Prince of Girona; 1466–1470	Succeeded by Ferdinand of Aragon
