= Louis de Bourbon (bishop of Liège) =

Roman Catholic bishop (1438–1482)

The Reverend Louis de Bourbon
- Prince-Bishop of Liège
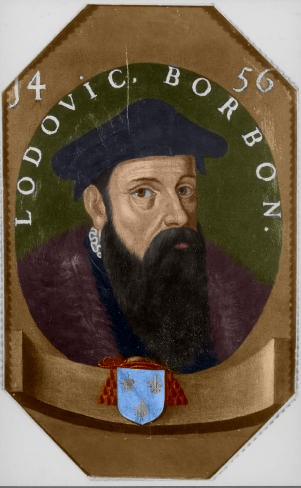
- Prince-Bishop of Liège (1456–1482)
- Church: Catholic Church
- Diocese: Diocese of Liège
- Installed: 1456
- Term ended: 1482
- Predecessor: John of Heinsberg
- Successor: John of Hornes

Orders
- Ordination: 2 December 1979

Personal details
- Born: 1438
- Died: 30 August 1482 (aged 44) (Assassination)
- Cause of death: Assassinated by William de la Marck
- Coat of arms

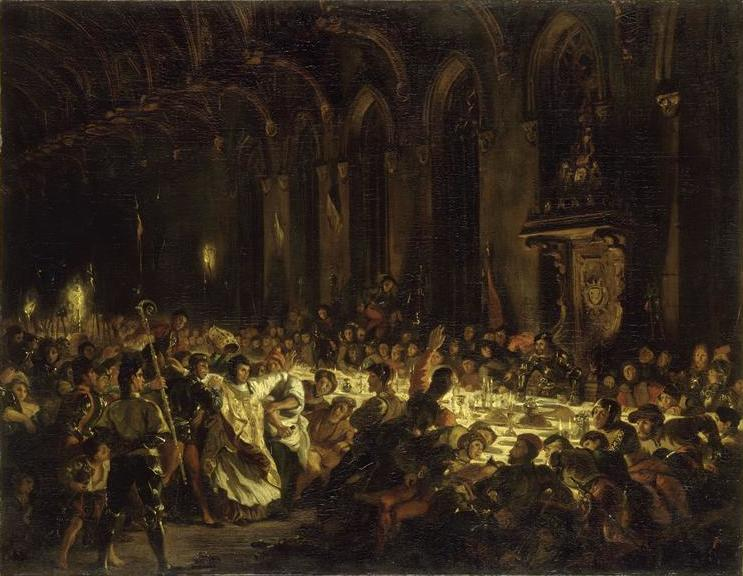
Assassination of the Bishop of Liège, by Eugène Delacroix

Louis de Bourbon (1438 – 30 August 1482 in Liège) was Prince-Bishop of Liège from 1456 until his death.

== Family ==
He was the son of Charles I, Duke of Bourbon, and Agnes of Burgundy. His own sister Isabella was the second wife of Charles the Bold.

He was brought up and educated by his uncle Philip, Duke of Burgundy, who let him study for ten years at the University of Leuven.

It has been said that Louis married, in secret in 1464, Catherine, daughter of Arnold, Duke of Gelderland; these claims date only from the seventeenth century and are now believed to be false.

Louis' three children (all likely to have been born from a mistress) were:

- Pierre de Bourbon, bâtard de Liège (1464–1529)
- Louis de Bourbon, bâtard de Liège (1465–1500)
- Jacques de Bourbon, bâtard de Liège (1466–1537)

Louis' eldest son, Pierre, founded the Bourbon-Busset family.

== Conflict over the bishopric ==
In 1456, Louis was given, through the efforts of Philip, Duke of Burgundy, the Prince-Bishopric of Liège, by influencing Pope Callixtus III and removing the 69-year-old John of Heinsberg. Given the strategic position of Liège almost enclosed by Burgundian possessions, Louis was a poor choice because his behavior quickly led to troubles, permitting French meddling. (Note: According to Paul Murray Kendall, Louis lacked both religious and administrative talents.)

The citizens rejected the new bishop and the Burgundian influence, which led to the Liège Wars. Louis was exiled to Maastricht. Marc de Bade was put in place by the Liégeois, who fought under Raes van Heers, restored the bishop, but Liège lost its sovereignty. Another revolt in 1467 was crushed at the Battle of Brustem.

In the summer of 1468, Louis was back in his prince-bishopric, after a papal legate had intervened, but was captured at Tongeren by a raiding party from Liège, at that time again asserting independence of Charles the Bold of Burgundy. An unlikely alliance of Charles with Louis XI, who in 1465 had helped the Liégeois against the bishop, saw Bishop Louis released. Liège was taken, and sacked on 30 October 1468. In gratitude Louis gave Charles the Horn of St Hubert, now in the Wallace Collection

== Later life ==
Louis sold Condé and Leuze to Marie de Montmorency.

In 1477, Charles the Bold was killed, and his daughter and heiress Mary of Burgundy was forced to sign the Peace of Saint-Jacques, consolidating the bishop's position but returning sovereignty to Liège. He was at this time amongst the advisers of Mary who wanted her to marry the future Charles VIII of France, then Dauphin of France.

Louis ruled until 30 August 1482, when he was assassinated by William de la Marck, an adventurer who from 1478 had been operating against the territory from the Castle of Logne.

== In literature and the Arts ==
The murder of Louis is depicted in the novel Quentin Durward by Sir Walter Scott, but its historical details are far from accurate. Scott's own introduction admits this: "In assigning the present date to the murder of the Bishop of Liege, Louis de Bourbon, history has been violated. It is true that the Bishop was made prisoner by the insurgents of that city. It is also true that the report of the insurrection came to Charles with a rumour that the Bishop was slain, which excited his indignation against Louis, who was then in his power. But these things happened in 1468, and the Bishop's murder did not take place till 1482."

A painting entitled The Bishop of Liege slain by order of William de la Marck, the "Wild Boar of Ardennes" by J. Franklin was published in Fisher's Drawing Room Scrap Book, 1838 (engraved by E. Portbury) with a poetical illustration by Letitia Elizabeth Landon, as Death of Louis of Bourbon.

== Sources ==
- Arnade, Peter (2008). Beggars, Iconoclasts, and Civic Patriots: The Political Culture of the Dutch Revolt. Cornell University Press.
- Bauer-Smith, Charlotte (2004). "Mapping Family Lines: A Late Fifteenth-Century Example of Genealogical Display". In Biggs, Douglas L.; Michalove, Sharon D.; Reeves, Albert Compton (eds.). Reputation and Representation in Fifteenth Century Europe. Brill.
- Kendall, Paul Murray (1971). Louis XI, The Universal Spider. W.W. Norton.
- Mann, James (1950). "The Horn of Saint Hubert". The Burlington Magazine. 92 (567 (June)). Burlington Magazine Publications Ltd.
- Poitrineau, Abel, ed. (1973). Le mémoire sur l'état de la Généralité de Riom en 1697 dresse pour l'instruction du duc de Bourgogne par l'intendant Lefevre d'Ormesson (in French). Institut D'Etudes du Massif Central.
- Scott, Walter (1902). Quentin Durward. Vol. II. T. and A. Constable.
- Vaughan, Richard (1970). Philip the Good. The Boydell Press.

Catholic Church titles
Preceded by John of Heinsberg	Prince-Bishop of Liège; 1456 – 1482	Succeeded by John of Hornes
