= Philippa of Guelders =

Duchess consort of Lorraine (1464–1547)

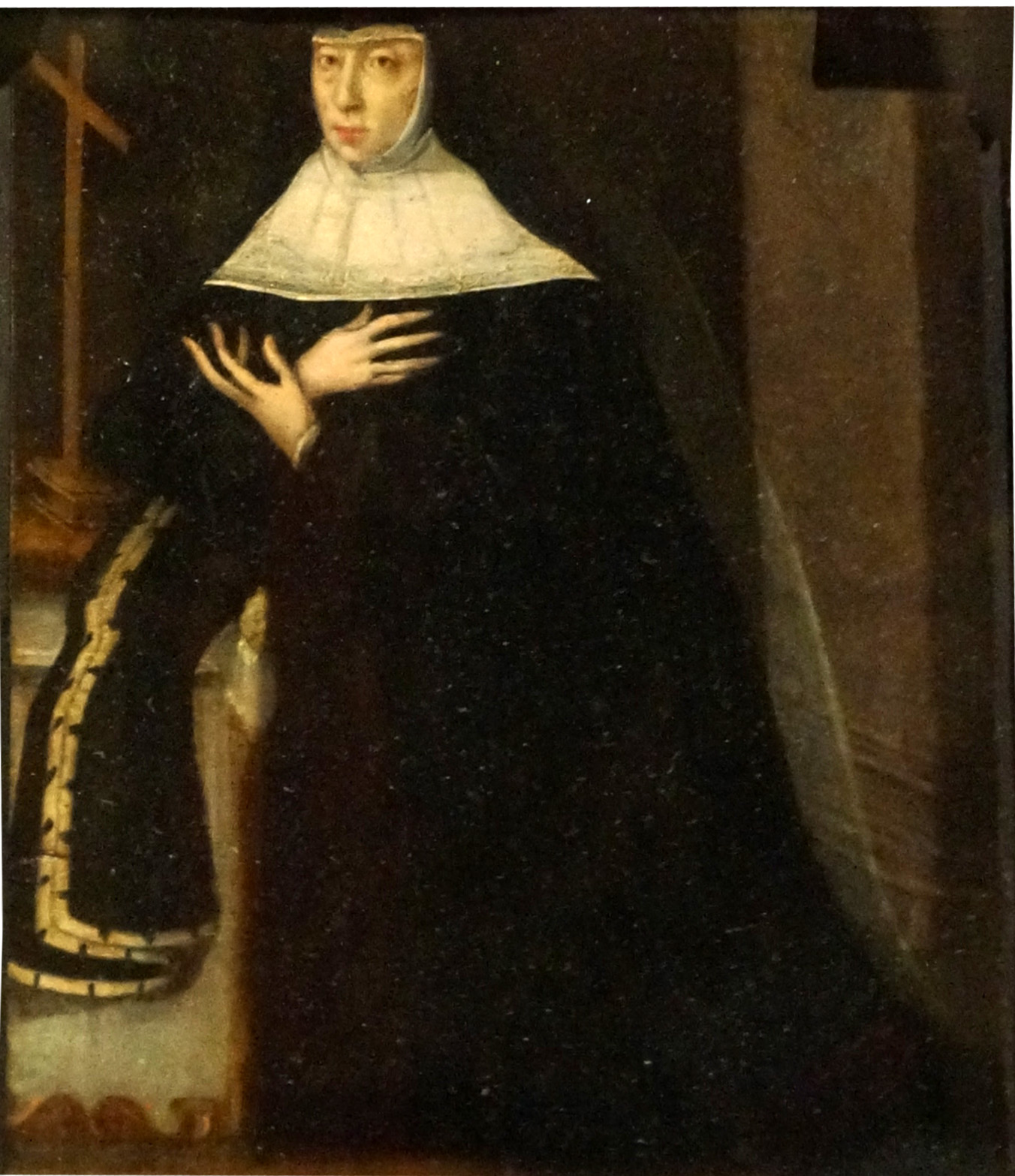

Duchess consort of Lorraine
- Tenure: 1 September 1485 – 10 December 1508
- Born: 1464; Grave
- Died: 1547 (aged 82–83); Convent of Poor Clares of Pont-à-Mousson
- Burial: Cordeliers Convent, Nancy
- Spouse: René II, Duke of Lorraine (m. 1485; died 1508)
- Issue Among others...: Antoine, Duke of Lorraine; Claude, Duke of Guise; John, Cardinal of Lorraine; Louis, Count of Vaudémont; François de Lorraine
- House: Egmond
- Father: Adolf of Egmond
- Mother: Catherine of Bourbon

Philippa of Guelders (French: Philippe de Gueldres; 1464 – 1547), was a Duchess consort of Lorraine. She served as regent of Lorraine in 1509 during the absence of her son. She was the great-grandmother of Mary, Queen of Scots.

== Life ==
Philippa was born in Brabant in 1464, the daughter of Adolf of Egmond and Catherine of Bourbon. She was the twin of Charles, Duke of Guelders; they were born at Grave, and were their parents' only children. To strengthen the ties between the Kingdom of France and the Duchy of Lorraine, she was chosen as the bride of René II, Duke of Lorraine (1451–1508). The marriage took place in Orléans on 1 September 1485.

After the death of her spouse in 1508, Philippa tried to assume the regency of the duchy in the name of her son Anthony, who was 19 years old, but it was decided that he was old enough to reign alone. However, when Duke Anthony left to serve in the French campaign in Italy in 1509, he appointed his mother, Philippa, to serve as regent in Lorraine during his absence. Her regency has been regarded as a wise one.

On 13 June 1509 she redeemed the lordship of Mayenne from Margaret of Vaudémont, Duchess of Alençon. She retired to the Convent of Poor Clares at Pont-à-Mousson on 15 December 1519 where she remained until her death. She was still a dominant figure in her family and often visited by her relatives, who treated her with great respect, and she maintained a reputation of piety and popularity with the public.

While at the convent Philippa commanded that a magnificent altarpiece be built for the congregation, it remained there until her death. She died at the Convent of Poor Clares of Pont-à-Mousson on 1547.

== Burial ==
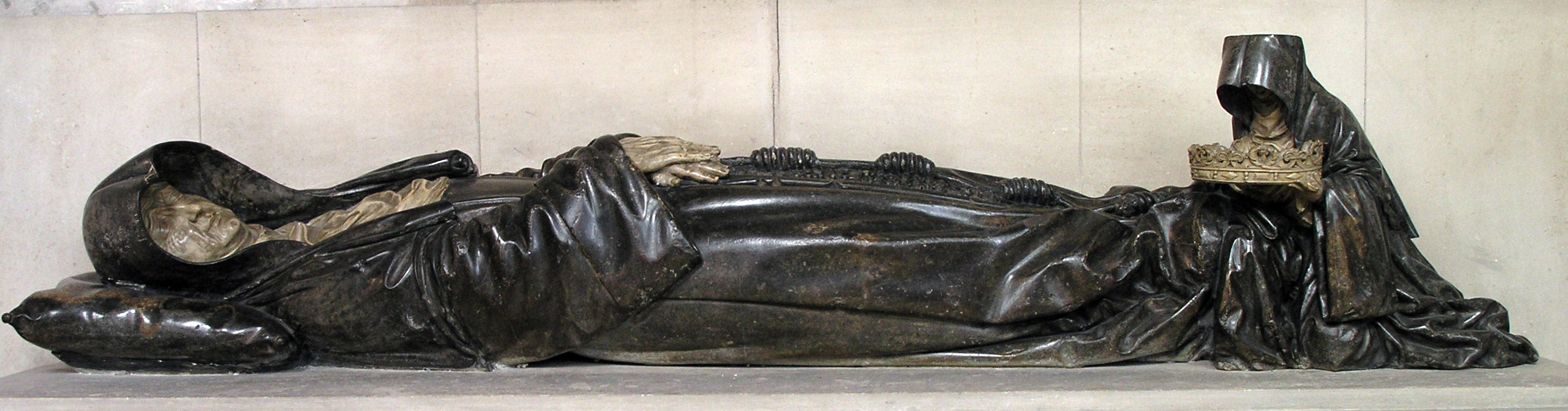
Effigy of Philippa

Philippa's son Louis died of plague in 1528. His heart was placed in a casket beneath the sepulchre and covered with a black velvet shroud with the arms of Lorraine, at the Convent of Pont-à-Mousson. When Philippa died in 1547, she was buried at the convent. In 1576, her Protestant cousin Louis, Prince of Condé, sheltered the convent from his troops when he visited her grave.

== Children ==
Philippa and René had the following children:

- Charles (b. 17 August 1486, Nancy), d. young
- Francis (5 July 1487, Pont-à-Mousson) (died shortly after birth)
- Antoine, Duke of Lorraine (1489–1544)
- Anne (19 December 1490, Bar-le-Duc – 1491)
- Nicholas (9 April 1493, Nancy), d. young
- Isabelle (2 November 1494, Lunéville – bef. 1508)
- Claude, Duke of Guise (1496–1550), first Duke of Guise
- John, Cardinal of Lorraine and Bishop of Metz (1498–1550)
- Louis, Count of Vaudémont (1500–1528)
- Claude and Catherine (twins) (24 November 1502, Bar-le-Duc), d. young
- Francis, Count of Lambesc (1506–1525); killed in the Battle of Pavia

== Sources ==
- Bogdan, Henry (2007). La Lorraine des ducs (in French). Perrin.
- Carroll, Stuart (2011). Martyrs and Murderers: The Guise Family and the Making of Europe. Oxford University Press.
- Denis, Paul (1911). Ligier Richier: l'artiste et son œuvre. Berger-Levrault. "philippe de."
- Hanawalt, Barbara; Reyerson, Kathryn, eds. (1994). City and Spectacle in Medieval Europe. Vol. 6. University of Minnesota Press.
- Knecht, R.J. (1982). Francis I. Cambridge University Press.

Philippa of Guelders House of Egmond Born: 9 November 1467 Died: 28 February 1547
Royal titles
| Preceded by Joan, Countess of Tancarville | Duchess consort of Lorraine; 1485–1508 | Succeeded by Renée of Bourbon |
