= Adolf, Duke of Guelders =

Duke of Guelders

- Born: 12 February 1438; Grave
- Died: 27 June 1477 (aged 39); Tournai
- Noble family: House of Egmond
- Spouse: Catherine of Bourbon
- Issue: Charles II, Duke of Guelders; Philippa
- Father: Arnold, Duke of Guelders
- Mother: Catherine of Cleves

Coat of arms of Adolf

Adolf of Egmond (Grave, 12 February 1438 – Tournai, 27 June 1477) was a Duke of Guelders, Count of Zutphen from 1465 to 1471 and in 1477.

== Life ==
Adolf was the son of Arnold of Guelders and Catherine of Cleves. In the battle of succession for Guelders, he imprisoned in 1465 his own father and became duke with the support of Philip the Good, who also made him a knight in the Order of the Golden Fleece. In 1468, he won the Battle of Straelen against Cleves, but Charles the Bold reinstated his father Arnold, and Adolf was imprisoned in Hesdin.

After the death of Charles the Bold in 1477, Adolf was liberated by the Flemish. He died the same year at the head of a Flemish army besieging Tournai, after the States of Guelders had recognized him as duke. His body was buried in Tournai Cathedral.

== Family and issue ==
Adolf married Catherine of Bourbon (1440–1469), daughter of Charles I, Duke of Bourbon, in 1463. They had twin children :

- Philippa (1467–1547), married in 1485 René II, Duke of Lorraine (1451–1508)
- Charles (1467–1538), later Duke of Guelders, married in 1518 with Elisabeth of Brunswick-Lüneburg (1494–1572), daughter of Henry I of Lüneburg.

== Sources ==
- Nijsten, Gerard (2004). In the Shadow of Burgundy: The Court of Guelders in the Late Middle Ages. Translated by Guest, Tanis. Cambridge University Press.
- Vaughan, Richard (2004). Philip the Good: The Apogee of Burgundy. Vol. 3. The Boydell Press.

Adolf, Duke of Guelders House of Egmond Born: 12 February 1438 Died: 27 June 1477
Preceded by Arnold	Duke of Guelders; 1465–1471	Succeeded by Arnold
Preceded by Charles the Bold	Duke of Guelders; 1477–1477	Succeeded by Mary of Burgundy
