= William I de La Marck =

Belgian adventurer

William de la Marck (1446–1485) was an adventurer of German extraction. He became an important character in the late 15th century in the Prince-Bishopric of Liège. William's was nicknamed Le Sanglier des Ardennes (The Wild Boar of the Ardennes)— because he was as fierce as the wild boar which he delighted to hunt.

In 1482, he had Louis de Bourbon, Bishop of Liège, assassinated, in order to replace him by his own son Jean de la Marck. He failed to have Jean accepted, and the next bishop was John of Hornes. This act led to a civil war in the prince-bishopric.

On 21 May 1484, a treaty was signed at Tongeren, whereby the de la Marck family forfeited its claims to the bishopric and supported Liège's struggle against Maximilian I, Holy Roman Emperor for the reward of 30,000 livres. Bouillon castle was mortgaged to William de la Marck until the time of repayment.

In 1485, he was ambushed near Sint-Truiden and taken to Maastricht, where he was beheaded on 18 June 1485.

William's cousin Érard de La Marck became prince-bishop from 1506 until 1538.

His great-grandson William II de La Marck was an important leader of the Gueux de mer in the Eighty Years' War.

== Cultural influences ==
He is described by Sir Walter Scott as "William, Count of la Marck", in Quentin Durward.
