= Isabella of Bourbon =

French noblewoman

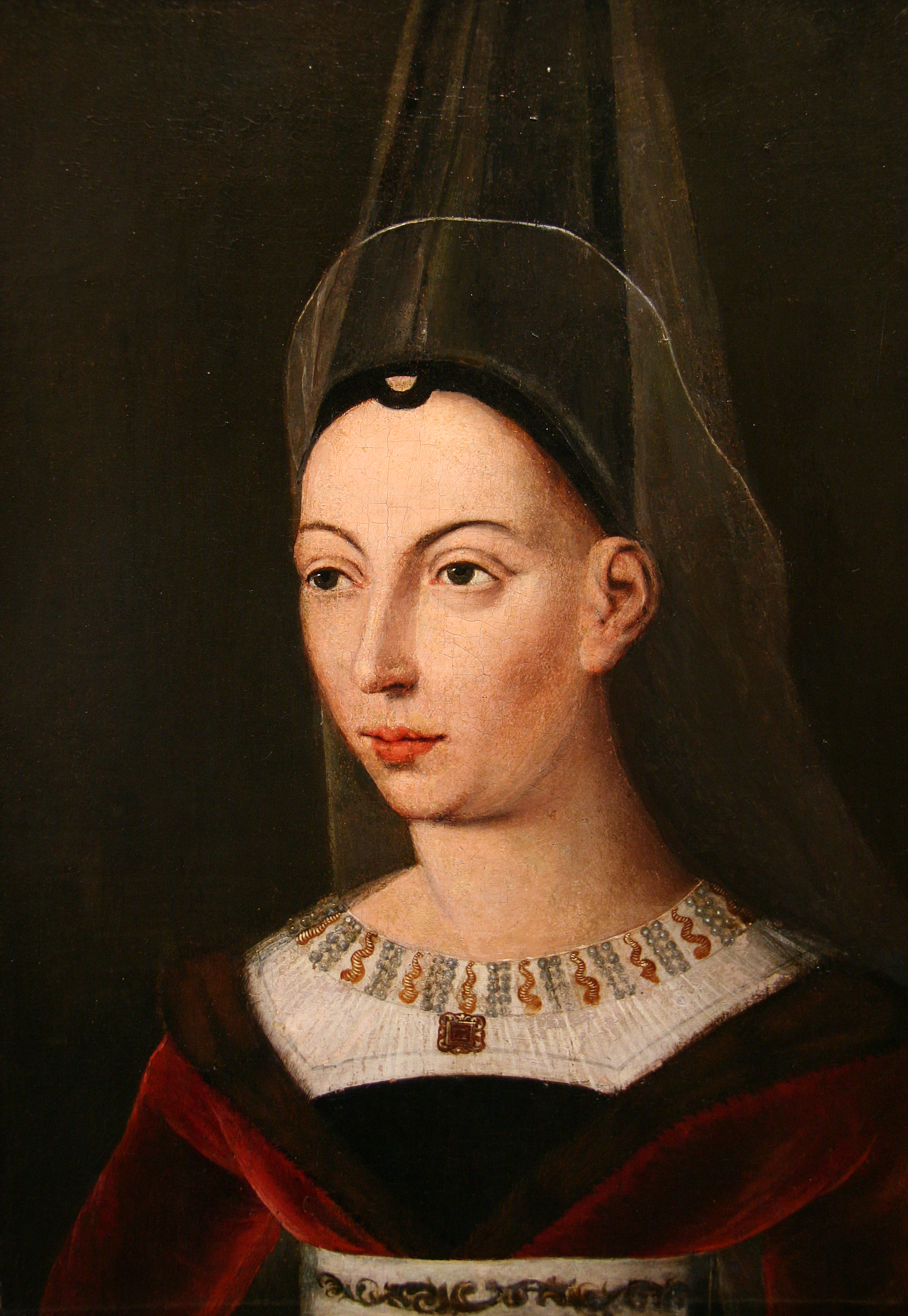
- 16th-century portrait of Isabella in the musée de l'Hospice Comtesse

Countess consort of Charolais
- Tenure: 1454 – 1465
- Born: c. 1434
- Died: 25 September 1465 (aged 30–31); St. Michael's Abbey, Antwerp
- Burial: Antwerp, Flanders
- Spouse: Charles, Count of Charolais (later Charles, Duke of Burgundy) (m. 1454)
- Issue: Mary, Duchess of Burgundy
- House: Bourbon
- Father: Charles I, Duke of Bourbon
- Mother: Agnes of Burgundy

Isabella of Bourbon, Countess of Charolais (c. 1434 – 25 September 1465) was the second wife of Charles the Bold, Count of Charolais and future Duke of Burgundy. She was the daughter of Charles I, Duke of Bourbon, and Agnes of Burgundy, and the mother of Mary of Burgundy, heiress of Burgundy.

== Life ==
Diptych depicting Isabella and her husband Charles the Bold. Stadsmuseum Gent

Not much is known about Isabella's life. She was the daughter of the reigning Duke of Bourbon, and his Burgundian wife, Agnes, daughter of John the Fearless, the powerful Duke of Burgundy.

Although her father was politically opposed to his brother-in-law, Philip the Good, he betrothed Isabella to Charles the Bold, only legitimate son and heir of Burgundy as a condition of truce. She married Charles on 30 October 1454 at Lille, France, and they were reportedly very much in love, perhaps because of (or causing) her husband's faithfulness.

In 1459, Isabella stood godmother to Joachim, the short-lived son of the refugee Dauphin of France and his second wife, Charlotte of Savoy. Upon his succession to the throne of France, the Dauphin abandoned his wife in Burgundy, leaving the young Queen Charlotte dependent on Isabella's aid.

After several months of illness, Isabella died of tuberculosis in Antwerp on 26 September 1465.

== Tomb ==
Isabella's early death meant that she had little significance or influence during her lifetime, but in death she became a symbol of the power of the Dukes of Burgundy, which would later be inherited by her only daughter Mary. As the duke's second marriage failed to produce a son, Mary was heiress to the duchy, and her marriage to a Habsburg had major repercussions for centuries.

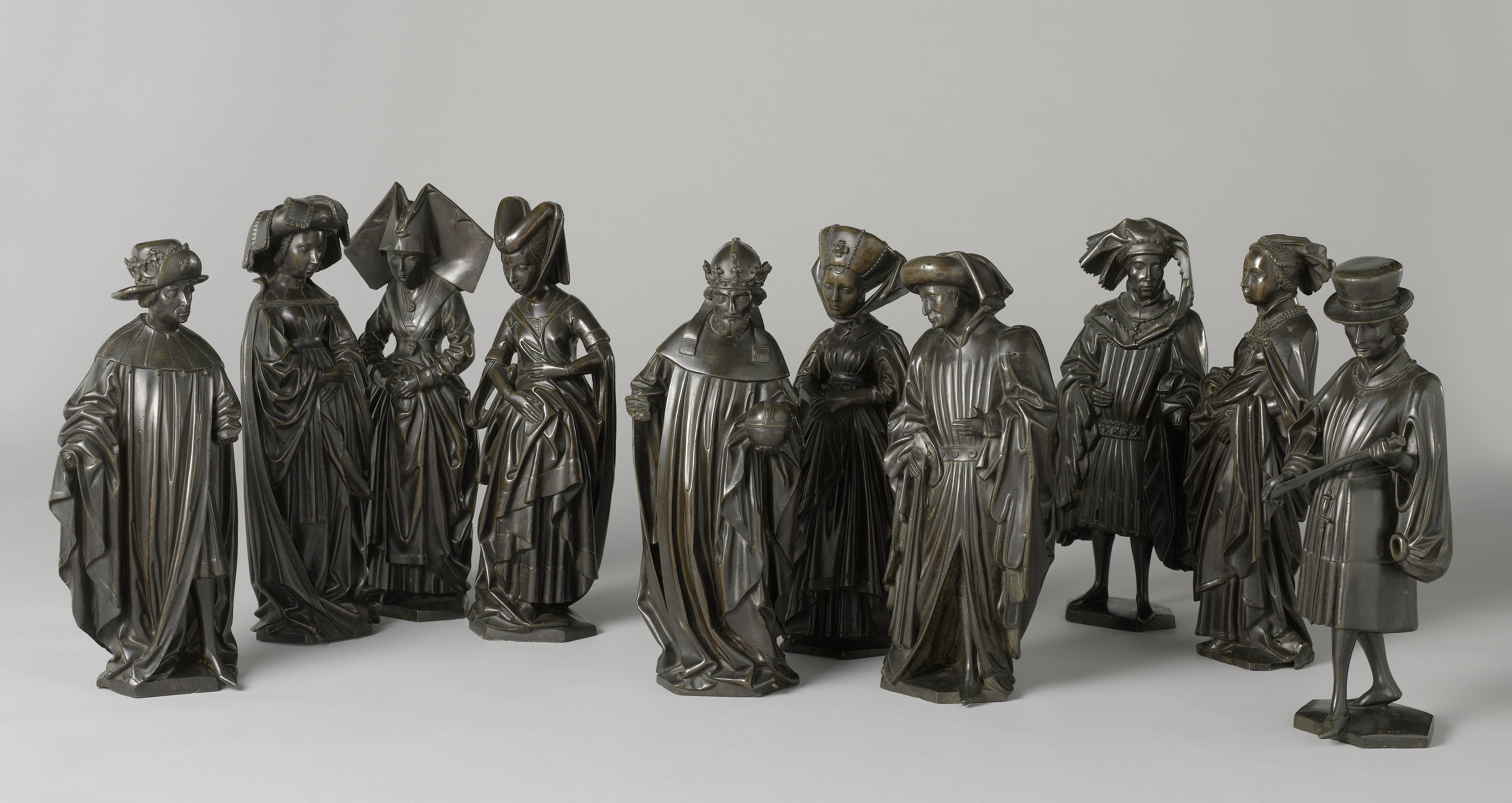
Weepers in the collection of the Rijksmuseum

Isabella's funeral monument was built in the church of St. Michael's Abbey, Antwerp in 1476. It was decorated with 24 brass copper alloy statuettes of noblemen and women standing in niches, now known as 'weepers' or 'mourners', placed above a bronze effigy of Isabella. Art historians generally attributed the carvings to Jan Borman the Younger and the castings to Renier van Thienen. The mourners clothes are of an earlier fashion than Isabella's, probably because the mourners were copied from older tombs.

The statues have been on display in the Rijksmuseum since 1887. The rest of the tomb, with the statue of Isabella, are in Antwerp cathedral. Nothing more of the tomb furnishings survives.

== Sources ==
- Darsie, Heather R. (2023). Children of the House of Cleves: Anna and Her Siblings. Amberley Publishing.
- Kiening, Christian (1994). "Rhétorique de la perte. L'exemple de la mort d'Isabelle de Bourbon (1465)". Médiévales (in French). 13 (27). doi:10.3406/medi.1994.1307.
- Mikolic, Amanda. "Fashionable Mourners: Bronze Statuettes from the Rijksmuseum". Cleveland Museum of Art.
- Scholten, Frits. "Isabella’s Weepers: Ten Statues from a Burgundian Tomb". Amsterdam: Rijksmuseum, 2007
