= Montverdun =

- Commune
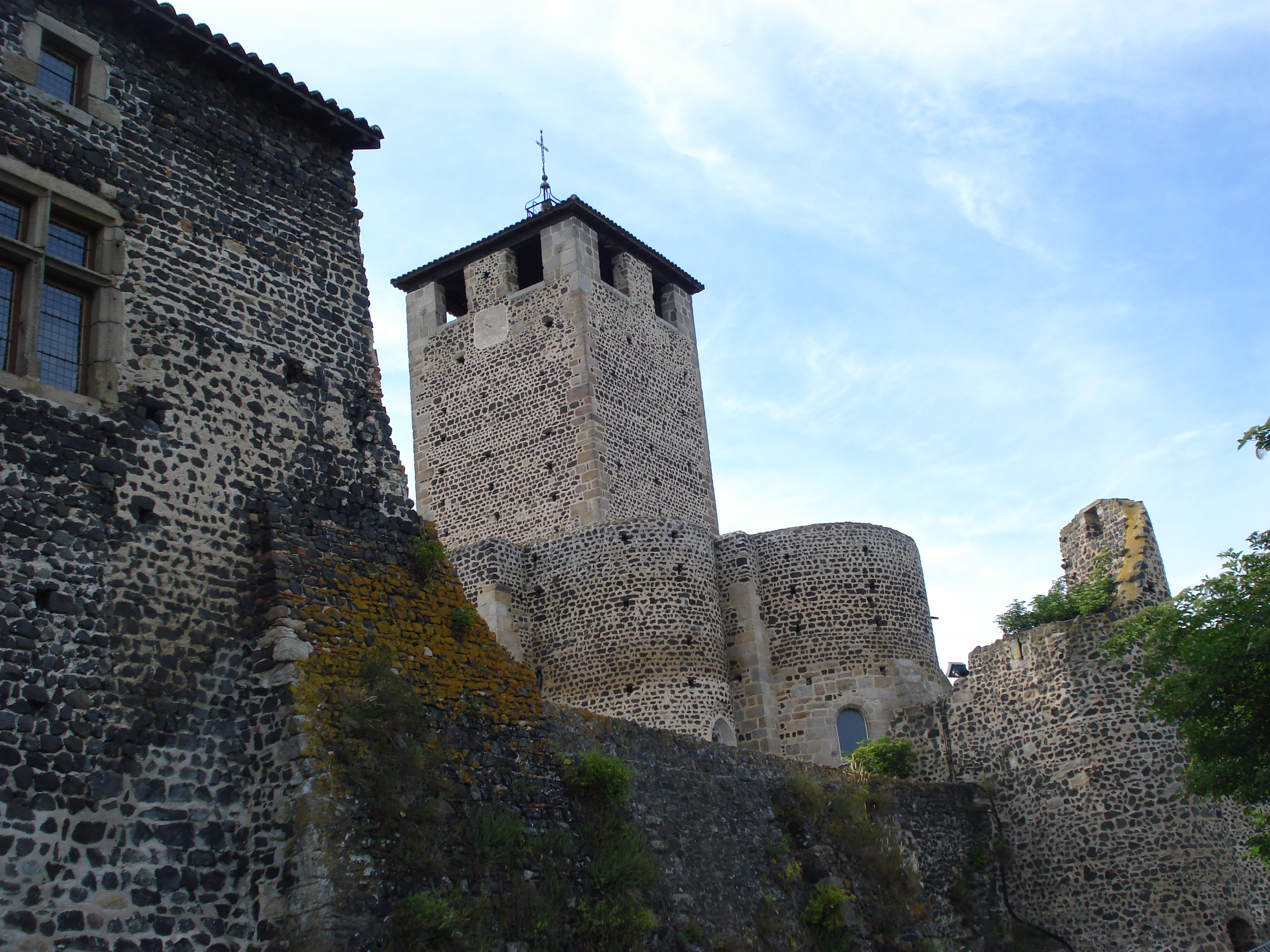
- Church and ramparts

- Coat of arms
- Location of Montverdun
- Location within France Location within Auvergne-Rhône-Alpes
- Coordinates: 45°42′56″N 4°04′04″E
- Country: France
- Region: Auvergne-Rhône-Alpes
- Department: Loire
- Arrondissement: Montbrison
- Canton: Boën-sur-Lignon
- Intercommunality: CA Loire Forez

Government
  - Mayor (2020–2026): Martine Matrat
- Area^{1}: 16.52 km^{2} (6.38 sq mi)
- Elevation: 378 m (1,240 ft)
- Highest elevation: 531 m (1,742 ft)
- Lowest elevation: 340 m (1,120 ft)
- Population (2023): 1,283
  - Density: 77.66/km^{2} (201.1/sq mi)
- Time zone: UTC+01:00 (CET)
  - Summer (DST): UTC+02:00 (CEST)
- INSEE/Postal code: 42150 /42130
- ^{1} French Land Register data, which excludes lakes, ponds, glaciers > 1 km^{2} (0.386 sq mi or 247 acres) and river estuaries.

Montverdun (French pronunciation: [mɔ̃vɛʁdœ̃]) is a commune in the Loire department in central France.

== Geography ==
The river Lignon du Forez flows through the commune.

== Population ==
Historical population
Year	Pop.	±% p.a.
1968	605	—
1975	605	+0.00%
1982	613	+0.19%
1990	698	+1.64%
1999	759	+0.94%
2007	981	+3.26%
2012	1,212	+4.32%
2017	1,381	+2.65%
2023	1,283	−1.22%
Source: INSEE

== See also ==
- Communes of the Loire department
