= Charles II, Duke of Bourbon =

Catholic cardinal and Duke of Bourbon (1433–1488)

His Eminence Charles II de Bourbon Duke of Bourbon
- Archbishop of Lyon
- Portrait of Charles II by Jean Hey, c. 1476–85
- Church: Catholic Church
- Diocese: Lyon
- Appointed: 14 November 1446
- Term ended: 13 September 1488
- Predecessor: Geoffroy de Versailles
- Successor: Hugues II de Talaru
- Other post: Cardinal priest of San Martino ai Monti

Orders
- Created cardinal: 15 January 1477 by Pope Sixtus IV
- Rank: Cardinal-priest

Personal details
- Born: c. 1433 Château de Moulins, France
- Died: 13 September 1488 (aged 54–55) Lyon, France
- Coat of arms

Charles II, Duke of Bourbon (Château de Moulins, 1433 – 13 September 1488, Lyon), was Archbishop of Lyon from an early age and a French diplomat under the rule of Louis XI of France. He had a 2-week tenure as Duke of Bourbon in 1488, being ousted afterward by his younger brother and successor, Peter II, Duke of Bourbon.

== Biography ==
Charles was the son of Charles I, Duke of Bourbon, and Agnes of Burgundy. Being a younger son, he was appointed Canon of Lyon in 1443 and, on 6 June 1444, elected Archbishop of Lyon at the age of 11. This election followed the death of Amedée de Talaru and the renunciation of John III of Bourbon, illegitimate offspring of his grandfather John I, Duke of Bourbon. His office was confirmed by Pope Eugene IV on 14 November 1446, after the death of Geoffroy Vassal, Archbishop of Vienne who the pope had first appointed in disregard of the Pragmatic Sanction in 1444. Due to his age, Charles II's archiepiscopate was administered in succession by Jean Rolin, bishop of Autun, from 1446 to 1447, Du Gué, bishop of Orléans, from 1447 to 1449, and John III of Bourbon, bishop of Puy, from 1449 to 1466.

At that time, he still maintained a good relationship with the King of France Louis XI, showing greater gusto for navigating the intrigue of secular politics than displaying the piety expected of his religious position. On account of these proclivities, after the conflict surrounding the League of the Public Weal in 1465, Louis XI sent Charles II with Thibaud de Luxembourg, Bishop of Mans as ambassadors to Pope Paul II, recently elected in 1464. On 7 January 1469 Charles II signed a royal letters patent as the king's adviser, at Plessis-lèz-Tours, the latter's main residence near Tours. As namesake, he was, along with Joan of Valois, Duchess of Bourbon and Edward of Westminster, godparent of the Dauphin Charles VIII. When Louis XI ended the Hundred Years' War in 1475, the archbishop assisted him in diplomatic matters while the king lives with Charles II at the Notre-Dame-de-la-Victoire-lès-Senlis abbey near Senlis. He arrives with Louis XI and his elder brother John II of Bourbon on 19 August at Picquigny to sign the eponymous treaty. Later, on 16 October, he signed in the abbey a letters patent to reestablish peaceable relations with Francis II, Duke of Brittany. Again, on 8 January 1476, as the head of the King's Council, Charles II signs four letters patent, among them one concerning the liberty of the Gallican Church at Château de Plessis-lèz-Tours.

From 1472 to 1476, he was incumbent as the papal legate at Avignon though he only arrived there on 23 November 1473. On 23 May 1474 Pope Sixtus IV appointed his nephew Giuliano della Rovere as bishop of Avignon, and 2 years later as legate. This set Louis XI and the pope into conflict, with the royal army and papal troops coming to bear. On 15 June 1476, to resolve this difficulty, the king welcomed Giuliano della Rovere at Lyon, so that Charles II accepted the loss of the Avignon legation. This is the reason why, in 1476, he became the administrator of the diocese of Clermont and was made a Cardinal by Sixtus IV.

It seems that after leaving Avignon, Charles II followed again in the wake of Louis XI. The cardinal was present with the king at Arras on 18 March 1477, during the campaign following the death of Charles the Bold. He was in 1486 the first commendatory abbot of the Priory Notre-Dame de La Charité-sur-Loire.

He was also a noted patron of the arts, lavishing money on Lyon's cathedral: the Bourbon chapel there, which he sponsored from 1486 onward (it was continued after his death by his brother, Peter II of Bourbon) was described as "one of the marvels of decorative art in the 15th century".

He was also Duke of Bourbon and Auvergne for a short period of time in April 1488, succeeding his elder brother, John II, when the latter died on 1 April. This prompted Charles II, as his brother's nearest heir, to claim the family inheritance in the Bourbonnais and Auvergne. The move was not tolerated by his younger brother, Peter, and Peter's wife, Anne of France, the latter immediately taking possession of the Bourbon lands by force on 10 April. On 15 April, members of the King's Council sent by Anne to "console the Cardinal on the occasion of his brother's death", forced him to sign a renunciation of any claims to the Bourbon lands, in exchange for a financial settlement. Charles then died later in the same year in mysterious circumstances, following a sudden collapse in a private house in Lyons. His brief tenure of the title during the period 1 April – 15 April would, however, be posthumously confirmed in 1505, when Charles de Montpensier acceded to the Duchy as Charles III.

Charles had an illegitimate daughter, with Gabrielle Bartine, named Isabelle (d. 1497). She was legitimized by Charles VIII and later married Gilbert of Chantelot, lord of La Chaise (Monétay-sur-Allier).

== In fiction ==
Charles II of Bourbon features in Victor Hugo's novel The Hunchback of Notre-Dame (Chapter III: Monsieur the Cardinal). It evokes the titles and the parentage of Charles II in these words: "Charles, Cardinal de Bourbon, Archbishop and Comte of Lyon, Primate of the Gauls, was allied both to Louis XI, through his brother, Pierre, Seigneur de Beaujeu, who had married the king's eldest daughter, and to Charles the Bold through his mother, Agnes of Burgundy."

== Sources ==
- Boehm, Barbara Drake (2020). A Blessing of Unicorns: The Paris and Cloisters Tapestries. Metropolitan Museum of Art.
- de Commynes, Philippe (2007). "X". Mémoires, Livre IV, tome II. Paris: GF Flammarion.
- Desormeaux, Joseph-Louis Ripault (1776). Histoire de la maison de Bourbon, Tome II (in French). Paris: Imprimerie royale.
- Elsig, Frédéric (2004). Painting in France in the 15th century. Harry N. Abrams.
- Heers, Jacques (2003). Louis XI. Paris: Perrin. ISBN 978-2262020842.
- Hugo, Victor (1888). Notre-Dame De Paris. Translated by Isabel F., Hapgood. ISBN 978-1482664737.
- Louis XI; Charavay, Étienne; Vaesen, Joseph F.L. (1887). Lettres de Louis XI, roi de France: publiées d'après les originaux pour la Société de l'histoire de France, vol. 4 (in French). Paris: Librairie Renouard. ISBN 978-0270898828.
- Louis XI; Charavay, Étienne; Vaesen, Joseph F.L. (1895). Lettres de Louis XI, roi de France: publiées d'après les originaux pour la Société de l'histoire de France, vol. 5 (in French). Paris: Librairie Renouard. ISBN 978-1294898825.
- Matarasso, Pauline (2001). Queen's Mate: Three Women of Power in France on the Eve of the Renaissance. Ashgate. ISBN 978-0754603214.
- de Pastoret, Claude-Emmanuel (1820). Ordonnances des Rois de France de la 3e Race, recueillies par ordre chronologique, vol. 17 (in French). Bréquigny: Imprimerie royale.
- de Pastoret, Claude-Emmanuel (1827). Ordonnances des Rois de France de la 3e Race, recueillies par ordre chronologique, vol. 18 (in French). Bréquigny: Imprimerie royale.
- Wadsworth, James B. (1962). Lyons, 1473-1503: the beginnings of cosmopolitanism. Mediaeval Academy of America. ISBN 978-0915651740.
- Ward, Adolphus William; Prothero, G.W.; Leathes, Stanley, eds. (1911). The Cambridge Modern History. Vol. 13. The Macmillan Co.

French nobility
Preceded by John II	Duke of Auvergne and Bourbon; Count of Forez and l'Isle-Jourdain; April 1488	Succeeded by Peter II
