= Charles I, Duke of Bourbon =

French noble (1401–1456)

Charles I
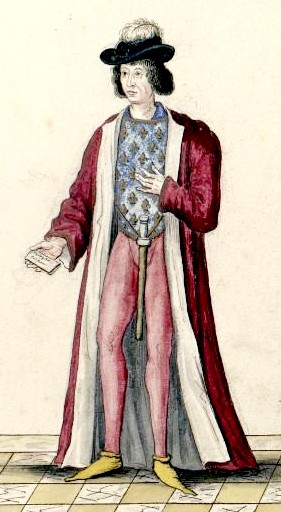
- Drawing of Charles I

Duke of Bourbon
- Tenure: 5 February 1434 – 4 December 1456
- Predecessor: John I
- Successor: John II
- Born: 1401
- Died: 4 December 1456 (aged 54–55); Château de Moulins
- Spouse: Agnes of Burgundy
- Issue: John of Bourbon; Marie de Bourbon, Duchess of Calabria; Philip of Bourbon; Charles de Bourbon; Isabella of Bourbon; Peter of Bourbon; Louis of Bourbon; Margaret of Bourbon; Catherine of Bourbon; Joanna of Bourbon; James of Bourbon
- House: Bourbon
- Father: John I, Duke of Bourbon
- Mother: Marie, Duchess of Auvergne

Charles de Bourbon (1401 – 4 December 1456) was the oldest son of John I, Duke of Bourbon, and Marie, Duchess of Auvergne.

== Biography ==
Charles was Count of Clermont-en-Beauvaisis from 1424, and Duke of Bourbon and Auvergne from 1434 to his death, although due to the imprisonment of his father after the Battle of Agincourt, he acquired control of the duchy more than eighteen years before his father's death.

In 1425, Charles renewed his earlier betrothal by marrying Agnes of Burgundy (1407–1476), daughter of John the Fearless.

Charles served with distinction in the Royal army during the Hundred Years' War, while nevertheless maintaining a truce with his brother-in-law and otherwise enemy, Philip III, Duke of Burgundy. Both dukes were reconciled and signed an alliance by 1440. He was present at the coronation of Charles VII where he fulfilled the function of a peer and conferred knighthood.

Despite this service, he took part in the "Praguerie" (a revolt by the French nobles against Charles VII) in 1439–1440. When the revolt collapsed, he was forced to beg for mercy from the King, and was stripped of some of his lands. He died on his estates at Château de Moulins in 1456.

== Children ==
Charles and Agnes had eleven children:

- John of Bourbon (1426–1488), Duke of Bourbon
- Marie de Bourbon (1428–1448), married in 1444 John II, Duke of Lorraine
- Philip of Bourbon (1430–1440), Lord of Beaujeu
- Charles of Bourbon (Château de Moulins 1433–1488, Lyon), Cardinal and Archbishop of Lyon and Duke of Bourbon
- Isabella of Bourbon (1434–1465), married Charles, Duke of Burgundy
- Peter of Bourbon, (1438–1503, Château de Moulins), Duke of Bourbon
- Louis of Bourbon (1438 – 30 August 1482, murdered), Prince-Bishop of Liège
- Margaret of Bourbon (5 February 1439 – 1483, Château du Pont-Ains), married in Moulins on 6 April 1472, Philip II, Duke of Savoy
- Catherine of Bourbon (Liège, 1440 – 21 May 1469, Nijmegen), married on 28 December 1463, in Bruges Adolf II, Duke of Guelders
- Joanna of Bourbon (1442–1493, Brussels), married in Brussels in 1467 John II of Chalon, Prince of Orange
- James of Bourbon (1445–1468, Bruges), unmarried.

== Sources ==
- Boehm, Barbara Drake (2020). A Blessing of Unicorns: The Paris and Cloisters Tapestries. Metropolitan Museum of Art.
- Hand, Joni M. (2017). Women, Manuscripts and Identity in Northern Europe, 1350-1550. Taylor & Francis.
- Kiening, Christian (1994). "Rhétorique de la perte. L'exemple de la mort d'Isabelle de Bourbon (1465)" (PDF). Médiévales (in French). 13 (27): 15–24. doi:10.3406/medi.1994.1307.
- Pernoud, Régine; Clin, Marie-Véronique (1986). Joan of Arc. Translated by Adams, Jeremy duQuesnay. St.Martin's Press.
- Vaughan, Richard (2004). Philip the Good. The Boydell Press.
- Ward, Adolphus William; Prothero, G.W.; Leathes, Stanley, eds. (1911). The Cambridge Modern History. Vol. 13. The Macmillan Co.

Charles I, Duke of Bourbon House of Bourbon Born: 1401 Died: 4 December 1456
French nobility
| Preceded by Marie | Duke of Auvergne; 1434–1456 | Succeeded by John II |
| Preceded by John I | Duke of Bourbon; Count of Forez; 1434–1456 | Succeeded by John II |
| Preceded by John I | Count of Clermont-en-Beauvaisis; 1424–1456 | Succeeded by John II |
