= John II, Duke of Bourbon =

John II
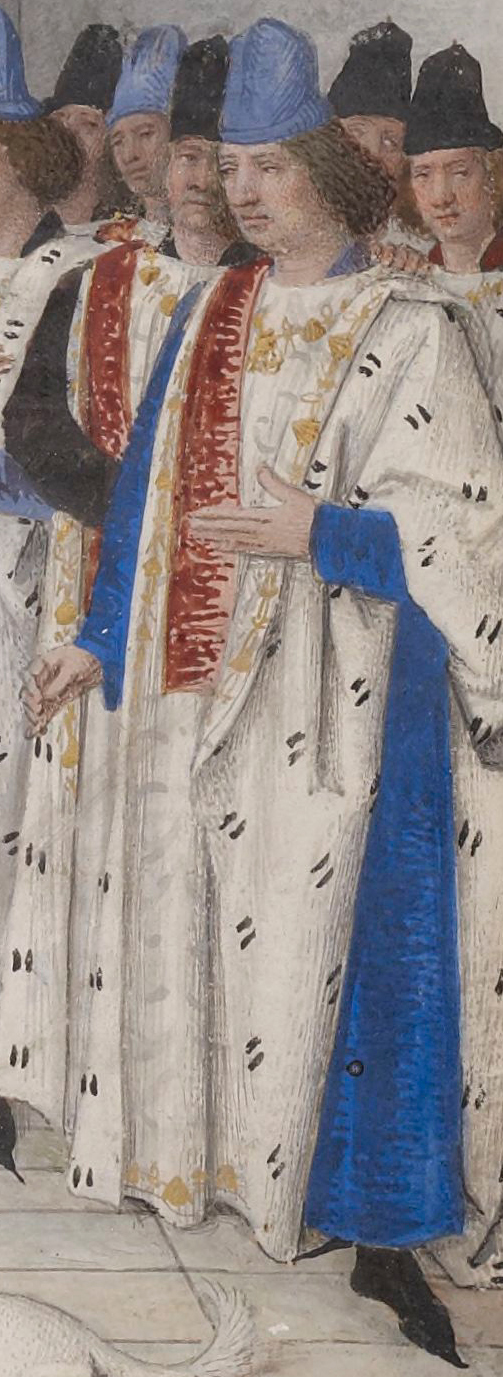
- John II, Duke of Bourbon, detail of an illumination by Jean Fouquet, Statuts de l'Order de Saint-Michel, 1470. Screen 9/76; see

Duke of Bourbon
- Tenure: 4 December 1456 – 1 April 1488
- Predecessor: Charles I
- Successor: Charles II
- Born: 1426
- Died: 1 April 1488 (aged 61–62); Château de Moulins
- Spouse: Joan of Valois; Catherine of Armagnac; Jeanne de Bourbon-Vendôme
- Issue: John, Count of Clermont; Louis, Count of Clermont
Names
- Jean de Bourbon
- House: Bourbon
- Father: Charles I, Duke of Bourbon
- Mother: Agnes of Burgundy

Jean (John) de Bourbon, Duke of Bourbon (1426 – 1 April 1488), sometimes referred to as John the Good and The Scourge of the English, was a son of Charles I of Bourbon and Agnes of Burgundy. He was Duke of Bourbon and Auvergne from 1456 to his death.

== Life ==
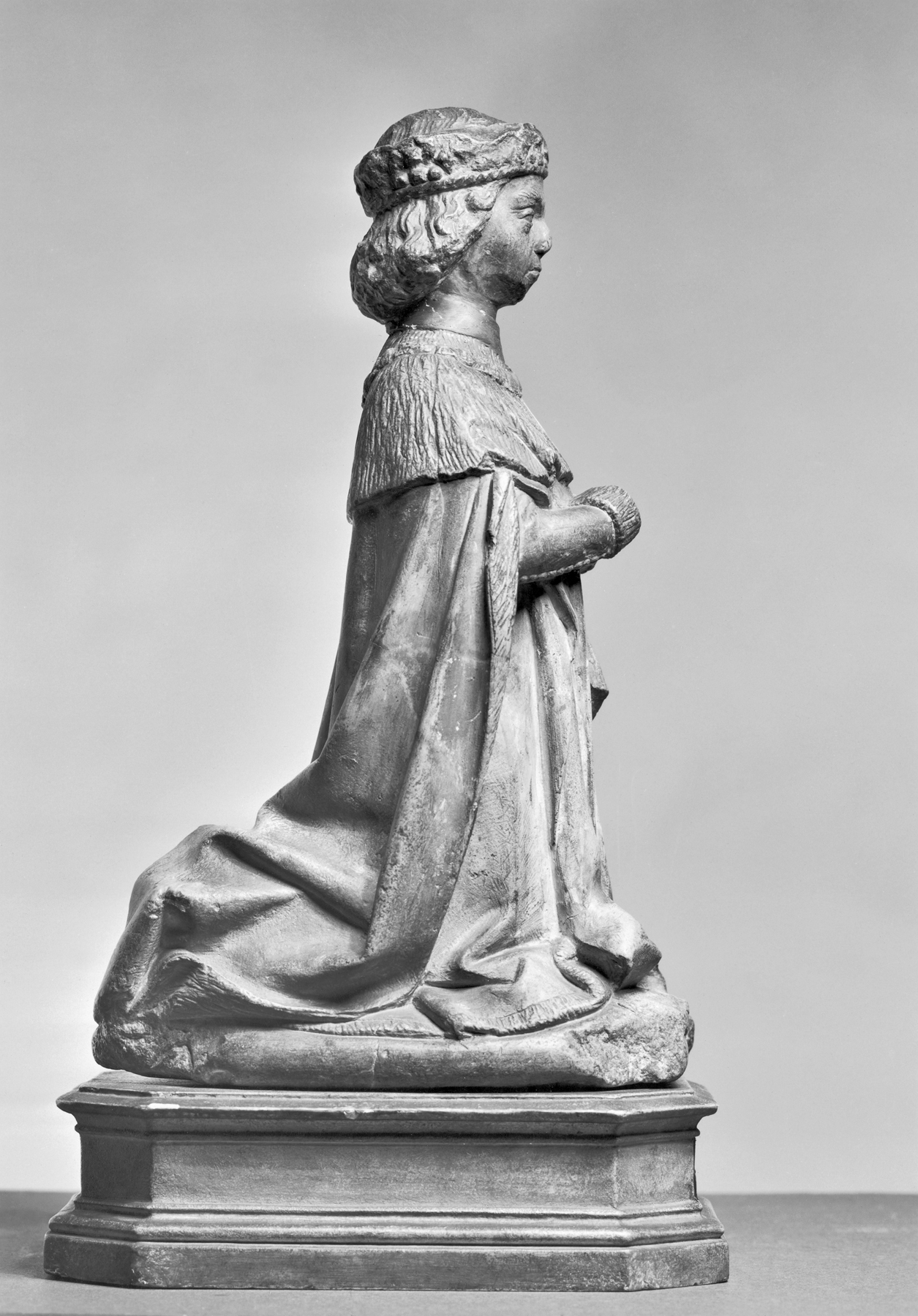
John II at prayer, wearing the collar of the Order of Saint-Michel, from the chapel in the crypt of the Sainte-Chapelle at Bourbon-l'Archambault, attributed to Michel Colombe (Walters Art Museum).

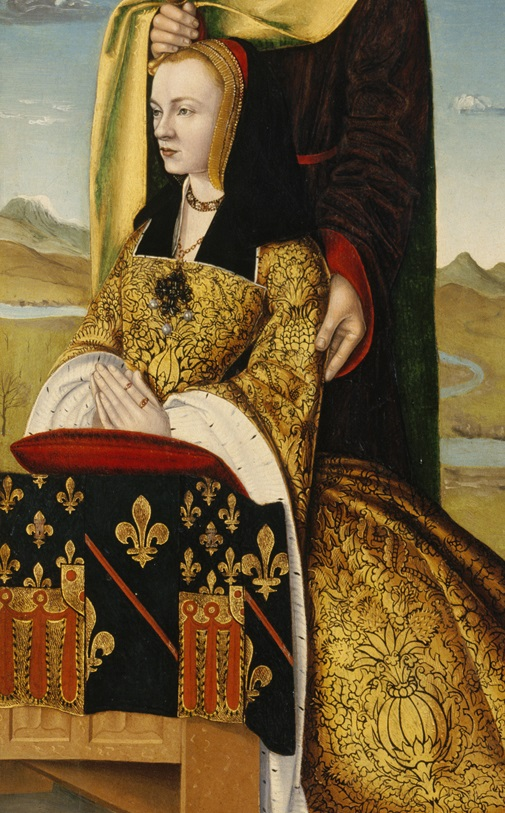
A portrait of John's third wife Jeanne of Bourbon-Vendome.

John earned his nicknames "John the Good" and "The Scourge of the English" for his efforts in helping drive out the English from France. He commanded the victorious French army during the Battle of Formigny in 1450 and the Battle of Martignas in 1453.

He was made constable of France in 1483 by his brother Peter and sister-in-law Anne, to neutralize him as a threat to their regency.

In an effort to win discontented nobles back to his side, Louis XI of France made great efforts to give out magnificent gifts to certain individuals; John was a recipient of these overtures. According to contemporary chronicles, the King received John in Paris with "honours, caresses, pardon, and gifts; everything was lavished upon him".

John is notable for making three brilliant alliances but leaving no legitimate issue.

== First marriage ==
In 1447, his father, the Duke of Bourbon, had John married to a daughter of Charles VII, King of France, Joan of Valois. They were duly married at the Château de Moulins. They had no surviving issue.

== Second marriage ==
In 1484 at St. Cloud to Catherine of Armagnac, daughter of Jacques of Armagnac, Duke of Nemours, who died in 1487 while giving birth to:

- John of Bourbon (Moulins, 1487 - 1487), styled Count of Clermont

== Third marriage ==
In 1487 he married Jeanne of Bourbon-Vendôme, daughter of John of Bourbon, Count of Vendôme (from a cadet branch of the House of Bourbon), by whom he had one son:

- Louis of Bourbon (1488 - 1488), styled Count of Clermont

== Illegitimate issue ==
By Louise of Albret, daughter of Jean I d'Albret (- 8 September 1494) (Note: daughter of Jean I of Albret (1425 - 3 January 1468), Lord of Albret, Viscount of Tartas, and Catherine of Rohan):

- Charles, Bastard of Bourbon (- 1502), Viscount of Lavedan jure uxoris, married before 1462 Louise du Lion (- aft. 25 February 1505), Viscountess of Lavedan, and had issue, four sons

By Marguerite de Brunant:

- Mathieu, the Great Bastard of Bourbon (- Château de Chambrou-en-Forez, 19 August 1505), Lord of Botheon and Lord and Baron of Roche-en-Régnier, unmarried and without issue

By unknown women:

- Hector, Bastard of Bourbon (- 1502, bur. Toulouse), 15th Archbishop of Toulouse (1491 - 1502), 17th Bishop of Lavaur (1497 - 1500)
- Peter, Bastard of Bourbon, died young, unmarried and without issue
- Marie, Bastard of Bourbon (- 22 July 1482), married at the Château de Beseneins-en-Dombes in 1470 Jacques de Sainte Colombe, Lord of Thil
- Marguerite, Bastard of Bourbon (1445 - 1482), legitimized in 1464, married in Moulins in 1462 Jean de Ferrières (- 1497)

== Death and aftermath ==
John died in 1488 at the Château de Moulins and was succeeded by his younger brother Charles. However, this succession was strongly contested due to the political strength of Peter and Anne. Within a span of days, Charles was forced to renounce his claims to the Bourbon lands to Peter in exchange for a financial settlement.

== Sources ==
- Blanchard, Joël (2007). Philippe de Commynes: Memoires: Edition Critique. Vol. II. Librairie Droz S.A.
- Julerot, Véronique (2006). Y a ung grant desordre élections épiscopales et schismes diocésains en France sous Charles VIII (in French). Publications de la Sorbonne. ISBN 9782859445485.
- Morrison, Elizabeth; Hedeman, Anne Dawson (2010). Imagining the Past in France: History in Manuscript Painting, 1250-1500. J. Paul Getty Museum.
- de Troyes, Jean (1906). The memoirs of Philip de Commines, Lord of Argenton. George Bell and sons.

Preceded by Charles I	Duke of Auvergne and Bourbon; Count of Forez; 1456–1488	Succeeded by Charles II
Preceded by —	Count of l'Isle-Jourdain; 1469–1488	Succeeded by Charles II
