= Yolanda (name) =

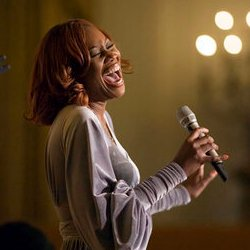
Yolanda Adams

Yolanda is a female given name from Western Europe and North America, derived from the Greek name Iolanthe meaning "Violet" (the flower). In German and Dutch the name is spoken similarly but traditionally spelled Jolanda and in Italian, Portuguese and Romanian Iolanda. Yolonda is an African-American spelling of the name. The French form is Yolande. Cognates are the Czech and Slovak Jolantha and the Polish Jolanta.

Notable people and characters named Yolanda include:

== Real people ==
- Yolanda of Flanders (1175–1219), ruler of the Latin Empire in Constantinople
- Yolanda of Courtenay (died 1233), queen of Hungary
- Yolanda of Vianden (1231–1283), prioress of Marienthal, Luxembourg, granddaughter of the former
- Yolanda (or Violant) of Hungary (1215–1253), queen consort of James I of Aragon
- Yolanda of Hungary (1235–1298), daughter of Béla IV of Hungary, niece of the former
- Yolanda of Lusignan (1257–1314), countess of La Marche
- Yolanda of Savoy (1901–1986), Italian princess
- Yolanda, an alias of Symbionese Liberation Army member Emily Harris
- Yolanda Adams (born 1961), American gospel singer
- Yolanda Andrade, Mexican photographer
- Yolanda Andrade (born 1970), Mexican television personality
- Yolanda Bako (born 1946), American activist against domestic violence
- Yolanda Bejarano (born 1974/1975), American union organizer
- YolanDa Brown (born 1982), British saxophonist
- Yolanda Brown, American singer
- Yolanda Bonnell (born 1965), Canadian actress and playwright
- Yolanda Cabrera (born 1959), Mexican artist
- Yolanda Caballero (born 1982), Colombian long-distance runner
- Yolanda Carenzo (1902–1968), Argentinian pianist
- Yolanda Casazza (1908–1995), American dancer of the Veloz and Yolanda ballroom dancing team
- Yolanda Charles, British musician
- Yolanda Chen (born 1961), Russian athlete
- Yolanda Ciani (1938–2023), Mexican actress
- Yolanda Coco Ferraro (1909–2019), Peruvian activist and politician
- Yolanda Cuomo, American artist, educator, and art director
- Yolanda Díaz (born 1971), Spanish politician
- Yolanda Foster (born 1964), Dutch American television personality
- Yolanda George-David, Nigerian medical doctor
- Iolanda or Yolanda Gigliotti (1933–1987), known as Dalida, Italian-French singer
- Yolanda Griffith (born 1970), American basketball player
- Yolanda Gutiérrez (born 1970), Mexican and German dancer, choreographer and installation artist
- Yolanda Hadid (born 1964), American television personality and model
- Yolanda Hamilton (footballer) (born 1987), Jamaican footballer
- Yolanda van Heezik, New Zealand professor of zoology
- Yolanda Henry (born 1964), American track and field athlete who specialized in the high jump
- Yolanda Jones (born 1984), Puerto Rican basketballer
- Yolanda Jurado, Spanish para-swimmer
- Yolanda King (1955–2007), oldest child of Martin Luther King Jr. and Coretta Scott King
- Yolanda Klug (born 1995/1996), missing German who disappeared in 2019
- Yolanda Kondonassis (born 1963), American classical harpist
- Yolanda Marculescu (1923–1992), Romanian opera singer
- Yolanda Martín (born 1954), Spanish boccia player
- Yolanda Mateos (born 1972), Spanish footballer
- Yolanda McClean, Canadian library technician and trade unionist
- Yolanda Mero-Irion (1887–1963), Hungarian-American pianist, opera and theatre impresario, and philanthropist
- Yolanda Mohalyi (1909–1978), Hungarian-born Brazilian painter and stained glass artist
- Yolanda Moore (born 1974), American basketballer and post-game radio analyst
- Yolanda Murphy (1925–2016), American cultural anthropologist, co-author of Women of the Forest
- Yolanda Ortíz (diver) (born 1978), Cuban diver
- Yolanda Panek (1974–1995), American murder victim
- Yolanda Pantin (born 1954), Venezuelan poet and children's writer
- Yolanda Quijano (born 1933), Mexican painter and sculptor
- Yolanda Hill Robinson, Second Lady of North Carolina
- Yolanda Saldívar (born 1960), American convicted murderer
- Yolanda Soares (born 1961), Portuguese singer and songwriter
- Yolanda Sonnabend (1935–2015), British theatre and ballet designer and painter
- Yolanda Tortolero (died 2021), Venezuelan politician
- Yolanda Toussieng (born 1949), makeup artist
- Yolanda Vega (presenter) (born 1955), American television presenter
- Yolanda Villavicencio (born 1962), Colombian economist and politician
- Yolanda Watkins, American mental health professional
- Yolanda Young (journalist) (born 1968), American journalist
- Yolanda Young (politician), American politician

== Fictional characters ==
- Yolanda (Black Lagoon)
- Yolanda Hamilton (The Young and the Restless)
- Yolanda Montez, DC Comics' Wildcat
- Yolanda, a character in Quentin Tarantino's Pulp Fiction
- Dr Yolanda Garcia, a surgeon in The Pitt
- Yolanda Buenaventura (BoJack Horseman)

== See also ==
- Yolanda (disambiguation)
