= Yolande =

Yolande may refer to:

- Yolande (given name), a feminine given name

== Arts and entertainment ==
- Iolanta, a lyric opera in one act by Pyotr Ilyich Tchaikovsky, first performed on 18 December 1892
- Yolande, a drama in music in one act by Albéric Magnard, first performed on 27 December 1892
- Yolande, an 1893 novel by William Black

== Other uses ==
- Yolande River, a river in Tasmania

== See also ==
- Iolanda
- Jolanda
- Jolanta
- Yolanda (disambiguation)
