= Iolanthe (disambiguation) =

Iolanthe is a Gilbert and Sullivan comic opera.

Iolanthe may also refer to:

== Arts and entertainment ==
- Iolanthe, the protagonist in 1845 play King René's Daughter
- Iloja, translated as Iolanthe, a 1905 play by Jerzy Żuławski
- Iolanthe, a character in several books in the Jack West Jr series
- Iolanthe, a character in The Revolt of Aphrodite
- Iolanthe, a character in Dragons of the Highlord Skies

== Ships ==
- Iolanthe (1881), a steam yacht that was renamed Iolaire, and sank in 1919
- Iolanthe (1887), a steamship of Millbrook Steamboat and Trading Co.

== Other uses ==
- Iolanthe, Gordon, a heritage-listed house in the Sydney suburb of Gordon, New South Wales, Australia
- Iolanthe, an ancestor of the racehorse Poseidon

== See also ==
- Iolanda, a given name
- Iolanta, an 1892 one-act lyric opera by Tchaikovsky
- Jolanda or Jolande, a given name
- Yolandi, a given name
- Yolanda (name), Spanish form
- Jolanta, Central European form
