= Yolanda =

Yolanda or Yolonda may refer to:

- Yolanda (name), a given name derived from the Greek Iolanthe

== Places ==
- Yolanda, California
- Yolanda Shrine, monument located at Barangay Anibong, Tacloban, Leyte

== Film ==
- Yolanda (film), a 1924 film starring Marion Davies
- Yolanda and the Thief, a 1945 musical-comedy film
- Yolanda (1952 film)
- Yolanda "Honey Bunny", in the 1994 film Pulp Fiction

== Music ==
- Yolanda Be Cool, an Australian band

=== Songs ===
- "Yolanda", by Bobby Blue Bland
- "Yolanda", by Pablo Milanés
- "Yolanda Hayes", by Fountains of Wayne
- "Yolanda, You Learn", by Lyle Mays and Pat Metheny

== Other uses ==
- Tropical Storm Yolanda, tropical cyclones named Yolanda
- Yolanda, a synonym of the orchid genus Brachionidium
- Yolanda (ship), a Cypriot cargo ship
- Yolanda, the Black Corsair's Daughter, 1905 adventure novel by Italian novelist Emilio Salgari
- Yolanda, a 1990 platforming video game for the Amiga and Atari ST
- Pauline Sharpe (1925–2005), or Nada-Yolanda/Yolanda, the leader of the UFO religion Mark-Age

== See also ==
- Iolanthe (disambiguation)
- Jolanda
- Jolanta
- Iolanda
- Yolandi, a given name
- Yola (disambiguation)
- Yolande (disambiguation)
