= Yolonda =

Yolonda is an African-American variation of the name Yolanda.

People of the name include:

- Yolonda L. Colson, American surgeon
- Yolonda Fountain Henderson, American politician
- Yolonda Morris, American politician
- Yolonda Ross, American actress, writer and director
- Yolonda, title character of the 1995 novel Yolonda's Genius by Carol Fenner
