= Yolande (given name) =

Yolande is a feminine given name. People, real or fictional, with this name include:

== Royalty and nobility ==
- Yolande of Aragon (disambiguation), several people
- Yolande of Dreux (disambiguation), several people
- Yolande of Montferrat (c.1274–1317), Byzantine Empress consort
- Yolanda of Courtenay (c.1200–1233), wife of Andrew II of Hungary
- Yolanda of Jerusalem, erroneous name of Isabella II of Jerusalem (1212–1228), queen of Jerusalem
- Yolanda of Vianden (1231–1283), daughter of Count Henry I of Vianden, Luxembourg; prioress of Marienthal from 1258
- Yolande of Dampierre
- Yolande de Lalaing
- Yolande, Duchess of Lorraine (1428–1483)
- Yolande of Valois (1434–1478), Duchess of Savoy
- Yolande de Polastron (1749-1793) Duchess of Polignac and favourite of Marie Antoinette

== Other people ==
- Yolande Ardissone
- Yolande Beckles
- Yolande Beekman
- Yolande Brener
- Yolande E. Chan, Jamaican-Canadian information systems professor
- Yolande Dalpé (born 1948), Canadian mycologist
- Yolande Donlan
- Yolande Du Bois
- Yolande Betbeze Fox (1928–2016), American singer, activist, and beauty pageant winner
- Yolande Dolly Fox, American actress, producer, and philanthropist
- Yolande Paris Campbell Grace (born 1992), American singer, comedian, and internet celebrity
- Yolande Grisé (born 1944), Canadian historian and writer
- Yolande Henderson
- Yolande Heslop-Harrison
- Yolande Labaki
- Yolande Laffon
- Yolande Le Calvez (1910-2002), French geologist, palaeontologist and geological engineer, specialising in foraminifera
- Yolande Mabika (born 1987), Congolese-born Brazilian judoka
- Yolande Moreau
- Yolande Mukagasana
- Yolande Ebongo Osongo, Congolese politician
- Yolande Palfrey
- Yolande Pompey
- Yolande Speedy
- Yolande Straughn
- Yolande Teillet
- Yolande Thibeault
- Yolande Touba
- Yolande Turner
- Yolande Villemaire
- Yolande Welimoum
- Yolande Zauberman

== Fictional ==
- The title character of Yolande, a lyric legend in three parts by Émile Wambach
- The title character of Yolande, a drama in music in one act by Albéric Magnard
- Yolande (Greyhawk), an elven queen in the World of Greyhawk setting of Dungeons & Dragons
- Yolande Perraudin, a school nurse in the French animated television series Code Lyoko
- Yolande Trueman, a character in the British soap opera EastEnders
