= Iolanda =

Iolanda is a given name used in Italian, Portuguese and Romanian languages. Notable people with this name include:

- Iolanda Balaș (1936–2016), Romanian Olympic athlete and high jumper
- Iolanda Batallé (born 1971), Catalan writer
- Iolanda Cintura (born 1972), Mozambican chemist and politician
- Iolanda Costa (born 1994), known as simply Iolanda, Portuguese singer and songwriter
- Iolanda Di Stasio (born 1992), Italian politician
- Iolanda Fleming (born 1936), Brazilian professor and politician
- Iolanda García Sàez (born 1975), Spanish ski mountaineer
- Iolanda Gigliotti (1933–1987), known as Dalida, Egyptian and Italian naturalized French vocalist and actress
- Iolanda Nanni (1968–2018), Italian politician
- Iolanda Oanță (born 1965), Romanian athlete

== See also ==
- Asteroid 509 Iolanda
- Jolanda
- Yolanda (disambiguation)
