= Yolanda Young =

Yolanda Young may refer to:

- Yolanda Young (journalist) (born 1968), American journalist
- Yolanda Young (politician), American politician
