= Caroline Shawk Brooks =

American sculptor (1840–1913)

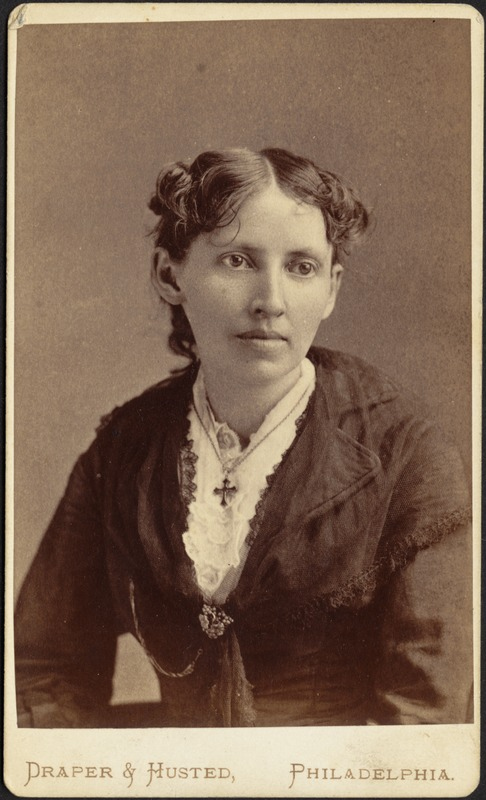
- Carte de visite
- Born: Caroline Shawk; April 28, 1840; Cincinnati, Ohio
- Died: 1913 (aged 72–73); St. Louis, Missouri
- Known for: Sculpture
- Notable work: Dreaming Iolanthe
- Spouse: Samuel H. Brooks

Caroline Shawk Brooks (April 28, 1840 – 1913) was an American sculptor. Well known for her work sculpting in the medium of butter, she also worked with more traditional materials such as marble.

== Early life ==
Caroline Shawk was born on April 28, 1840, in Cincinnati, Ohio. Her father, Abel Shawk, manufactured fire engines and steam locomotives, and invented a fire engine – the first successful one which was powered by steam. She showed her artistic talents as a young child, enjoying painting and drawing. Her first sculpting project, modeled in clay from a creek, was Dante's head. At the age of twelve, she won a medal for her wax flowers. She graduated from the St. Louis Normal School in 1862, and later that year married railroad worker Samuel H. Brooks. The Brookses initially lived in Memphis, Tennessee, where Samuel's railroad job was located. They later lived in Mississippi for a short time, before moving in 1866 to a farm near Helena, in Phillips County, Arkansas. The couple had one child, a daughter named Mildred.

== Butter sculpting ==
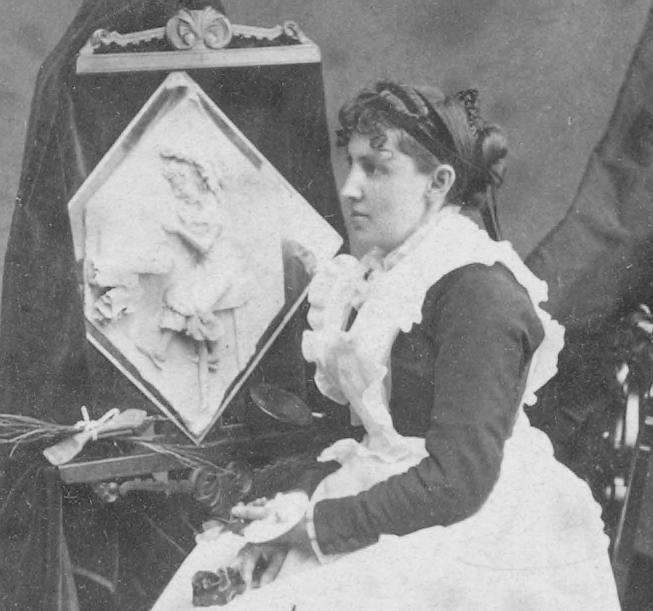
Caroline Shawk Brooks with one of her butter sculptures at Amory Hall in 1877

Brooks was the first known American sculptor working in the medium of butter, and she would come to be identified as "The Butter Woman". In 1867, she created her first butter sculpture, when, after the failure of the farm's cotton crop, she sought a source of supplemental income. Farm women of the time often created decoratively shaped butter using butter molds, but rather than molding, Brooks sculpted the butter into shapes such as shells, animals, and faces. Rather than traditional sculpting tools, she used "common butter-paddles, cedar sticks, broom straws and camel's-hair pencils". Her customers appreciated the skillfully sculpted butter, and there was a good market for her works. She continued producing her butter sculptures for about a year and a half, then took a break from it for a few years.

She resumed making butter art in 1873, when she created a bas-relief portrait, which she donated to a church fair. Her husband safely transported it, on horseback, the seven miles to the fair. The sale of the portrait earned the church enough money to fix their roof. A Memphis man who saw Brooks's work there admired it so much that he arranged for her to create a butter portrait, of Mary, Queen of Scots, to be displayed in his offices.

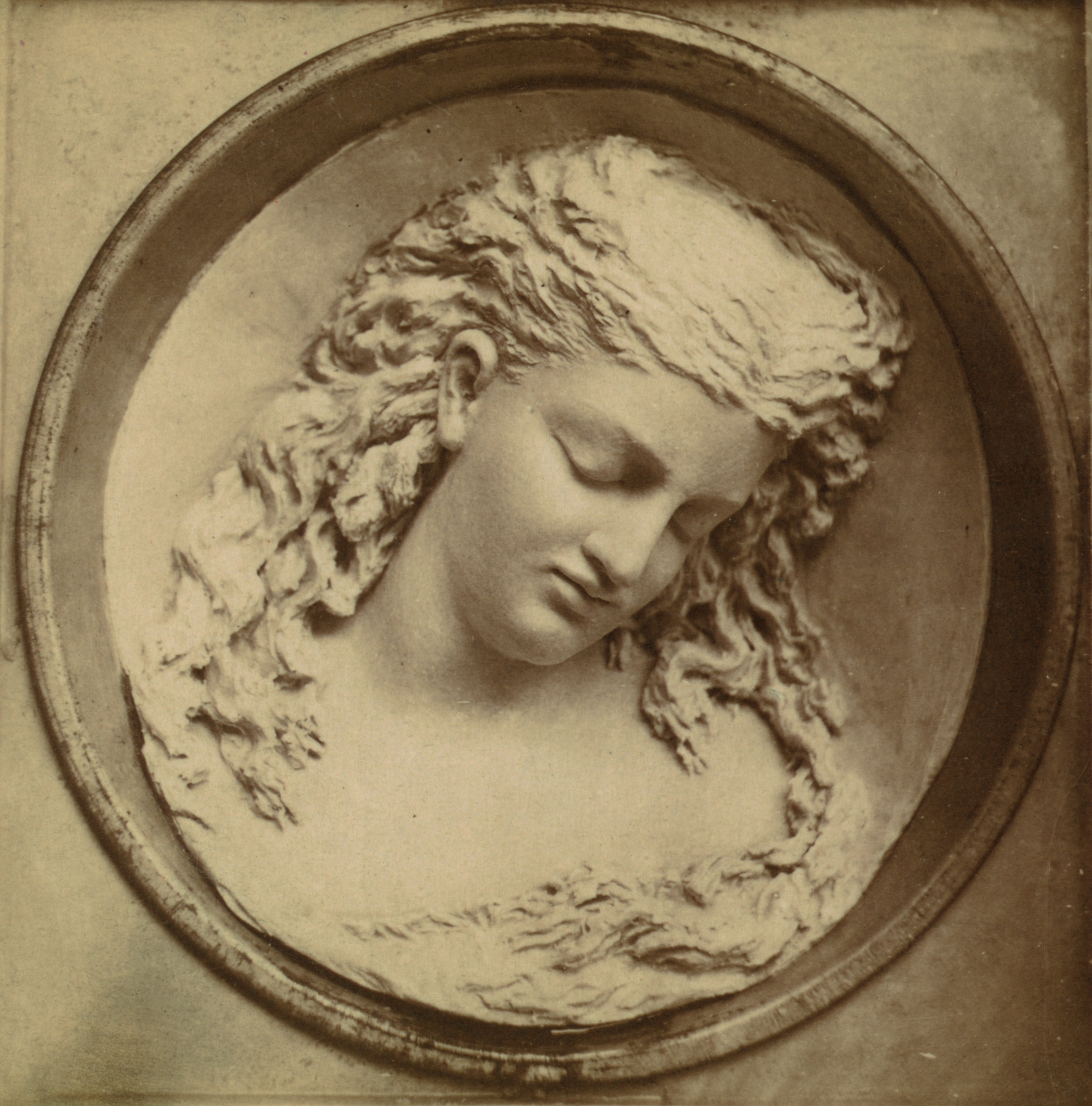
Dreaming Iolanthe, butter sculpture, 1876 Centennial Exhibition

In late 1873 Brooks read King René's Daughter, a verse drama by Danish poet and playwright Henrik Hertz. In the story, the character of Iolanthe is a princess who is blind, but does not understand the nature of this condition because her parents had hidden the truth from her. She came to realize that she was blind on her sixteenth birthday. Brooks was inspired by this character, and created a butter sculpture, Dreaming Iolanthe, depicting the innocent girl just before learning the truth. This work was displayed in early 1874 at a Cincinnati gallery, to financial and critical success. During its two-week exhibition, about two thousand people paid admission to view it. An article appearing in The New York Times declared that the "translucence [of the butter] gives to the complexion a richness beyond alabaster and a softness and smoothness that are very striking", and that "no other American sculptress has made a face of such angelic gentleness as that of Iolanthe."

Brooks created other versions of Iolanthe, including an alto-relievo which was exhibited at the Centennial Exposition – the 1876 world's fair held in Philadelphia, Pennsylvania. Her butter sculpture, in the Women's Pavilion, attracted huge crowds. She was invited to move from the Women's Pavilion to the main exhibit space in order to demonstrate her sculpting skills. This was an honor, but there may have been an additional motivation behind the invitation. There were often suspicions and accusations during this time period that female artists in general did not actually create the works for which they were taking credit. As a demonstration that she had, in fact, sculpted the piece, she created another head, in about ninety minutes, for a panel which included Exposition officials and members of the press. Observers were impressed both by the quick performance using crude instruments to sculpt in an unusual medium and by the artistic qualities of the finished work. One guidebook proclaimed Dreaming Iolanthe to be the "most beautiful and unique exhibit in the Centennial". Even though the circumstances of the demonstration may have seemed like a stunt, Brooks was largely considered to be a serious artist whose creations should be regarded similarly to work sculpted using more traditional methods and materials. Commentary about her piece said that "the difficulties attached to the employment of such a material should be taken into account, while it must be conceded that, whatever material the artist employs, the work itself is one exhibiting a high degree of talent, a fine ideal feeling, as well as exceeding delicacy and brilliancy of manipulation."

== After the Centennial Exposition ==
Following her very successful showing at the Centennial, Brooks gave lectures and demonstrated her craft while touring many cities, including New York, Chicago, Washington, D.C., and Des Moines. Brooks demonstrated her butter sculpting in 1877 at Boston's Amory Hall, where she created Pansy and The Marchioness. The latter, based on the Charles Dickens character who was a friend of Dick Swiveller from The Old Curiosity Shop, was reported to be Brooks's first full-length sculpture. Her daily demonstrations in Boston, for which she charged admission, helped raise money for a trip to Europe.

Around this period, it appears that Brooks and her husband had separated. (Samuel, who chose to stay in Arkansas, won an election as a state legislator in 1882.) She opened a Washington, D.C., studio and in 1878 sculpted a life-size version of Dreaming Iolanthe in butter, and shipped it to be exhibited at the Exposition Universelle in Paris. She found it amusing that customs officials had listed her sculpture not as a work of art, but as "110 lbs. of butter".

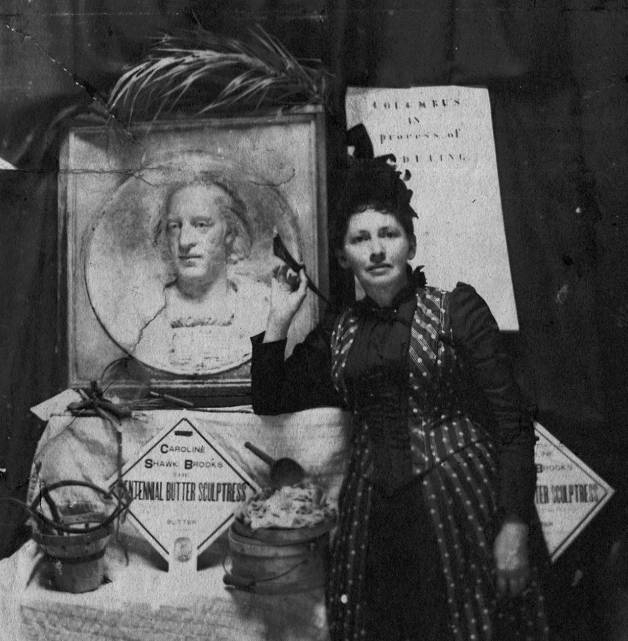
Brooks with a butter sculpture bas-relief of Columbus, 1893 Columbian Exposition

After opening a New York studio, Brooks sculpted many portrait busts in 1883 to 1886. Finally financially able to purchase marble, she used that material to sculpt subjects including Thomas Carlyle, George Eliot, James A. Garfield, Lucretia Mott, Emanuel Swedenborg, Thurlow Weed, and a group sculptural portrait of Alicia Vanderbilt La Bau (daughter of Cornelius Vanderbilt) with her four children.

Brooks exhibited her work at the Palace of Fine Arts and the Woman's Building at 1893's World's Columbian Exposition in Chicago, including a bas-relief of Christopher Columbus in butter, and four marble sculptures – Lady Godiva Departing, Lady Godiva Returning, the Vanderbilt family portrait, which she renamed La Rosa, and a marble version of Dreaming Iolanthe.

She lived in San Francisco from 1896 to 1902. Not much is known about her later years. She maintained a studio in her home after she moved to St. Louis, Missouri. She died in St. Louis in 1913. Very little of her work survives in public collections. She may be remembered not only as the "Centennial Butter Sculptress", but also as a feminist pioneer.

== Butter as an art medium ==
Working with, transporting, and exhibiting butter sculptures presented Brooks with a unique set of challenges. To preserve her butter sculptures, she created them in flat metallic milk pans which she set in larger pans filled with ice. By continuing to supply the outer pans with ice, she was able to keep her butter sculptures in good condition for months. When attempting to sail from New York to France with a life-size butter sculpture, she was forced to delay her departure until she was able to secure passage on a ship with sufficient ice to preserve her work throughout the journey; and then she faced the task of finding a railroad car which also had enough ice to safely transport the piece from Le Havre to the final destination of Paris.

Brooks was said to prefer butter over clay as a molding medium. The latter had to kept moist and wrapped to prevent it from cracking, was not as sensitive for sculptural manipulation, and was more difficult to cast. Brooks had conquered the major disadvantage of butter simply by using ice. She discovered that she could even use butter for casting. After preserving her original butter Dreaming Iolanthe for a half a year, she desired a method which would not require keeping it in cold storage. Without knowing ahead of time what the results may be, she mixed up some plaster and poured it onto the butter sculpture. The plaster quickly set, and she cut a hole in the bottom of the milk pan which held her creation. Brooks then set the pan over a container of boiling water, and the butter melted and drained out of the hole. She removed the remainder of the bottom of the pan, and was left with a greased plaster negative. She placed more plaster inside and, after some difficulty removing the outer layer, was left with a successful plaster positive. Brooks was issued a patent in 1877 for her process of creating lubricated plaster molds. She did not, however, use plaster casts to reproduce her butter sculptures, instead preferring to sculpt a new one for each exhibit.

While others came along, inspired by Brooks, to create butter displays, almost all of them were done in conjunction with commercial butter interests and dairy associations for promotion of their products at fairs and expositions, but Brooks dedicated her work to the creation of butter art purely for its artistic merit.

== Sources ==
- Haverstock, Mary Sayre; Vance, Jeannette Mahoney; Meggitt, Brian L. (2000). Artists in Ohio, 1787–1900: A Biographical Dictionary. Kent, Ohio: Kent State University Press. ISBN 0-87338-616-7.
- Hughes, Edan Milton (1989). Artists in California, 1786-1940. San Francisco, CA: Hughes Publishing Company. ISBN 0-9616112-1-9.
- Kellogg, Day Otis, ed. (1903). "Brooks, Caroline Shawk". The Encyclopædia Britannica: New American supplement. A-ZUY. The Werner Company. p. 608.
- Marling, Karal Ann (1987). "'She Brought Forth Butter in a Lordly Dish': The Origins of Minnesota Butter Sculpture" (PDF). Minnesota History Magazine. 50 (6). Saint Paul, Minnesota: Minnesota Historical Society: 224–225.
- "'Pansy' and 'the Marchioness'". Boston Daily Globe. May 15, 1877.
- Simpson, Pamela H. (Spring–Summer 2007). "Caroline Shawk Brooks: The 'Centennial Butter Sculptress'". Woman's Art Journal. 28 (1). Old City Publishing: 29–36. JSTOR 20358109.
  Note that "Simpson" in the "Notes" section pertains to this source, rather than those listed in the "Further reading" section.
- Wilson, James Grant; Fiske, John (1888). "Brooks, Caroline Shawk". Appleton's Cyclopædia of American Biography. Vol. 1. New York: D. Appleton and Company. p. 385.
