= Violant =

Violant is a given name, of Greek origin meaning violet. The form of the name in Greek is Iolanthe. Violant is the given name of:

- Violant of Aragon (1236-1301), Queen consort of Castile and León
- Violant of Bar (c. 1365-1431), Queen of Aragon
- Violant/Yolanda of Hungary (c. 1216–1253), Queen consort of Aragon
- Violant/Eleanor of Castile (c. 1241–1290), Queen consort of England and Countess regnant of Ponthieu
- Violant Cervera (born 1969), Catalan politician

== See also ==
- Violence
