= W. G. Wills =

Irish dramatist and artist

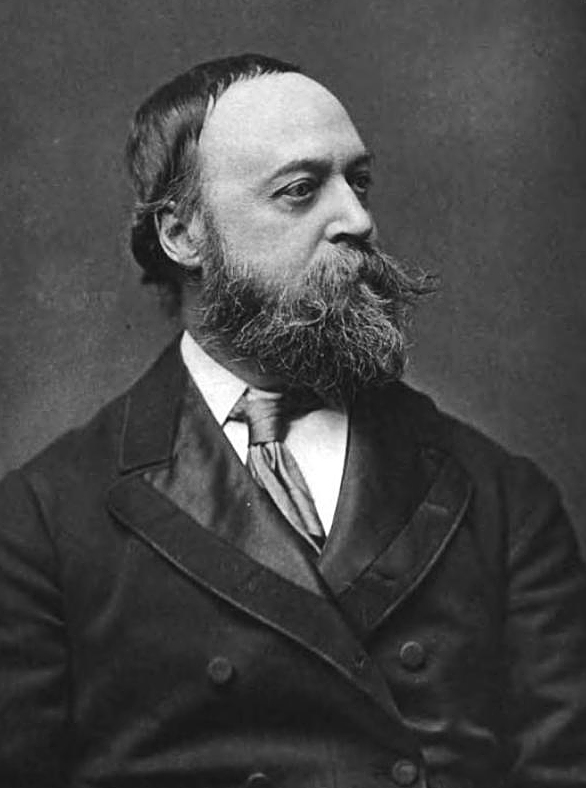
- Portrait of W. G. Wills, c. 1898.
- Born: William Gorman Wills; 28 January 1828; Kilmurry, County Kilkenny, Ireland
- Died: 13 December 1891 (aged 63); Guy's Hospital, London, UK
- Education: Trinity College, Dublin; Royal Hibernian Academy
- Occupations: Painter, playwright, poet
- Known for: Ophelia and Laertes
- Notable work: Charles I Faust

William Gorman Wills (28 January 1828 – 13 December 1891) was an Irish dramatist, novelist and painter.

== Early life and career ==
Wills was born at Blackwell lodge in Kilmurry, near Thomastown in County Kilkenny, Ireland, the son of the Reverend James Wills (1790–1868), author of Lives of Illustrious and Distinguished Irishmen, and his wife Katherine Gorman Wills. As a young man, he was educated at Waterford Grammar School and later went to Trinity College, Dublin where he took no degree, but was awarded the Vice-Chancellor's Medal for his poem "Poland." He later left the university and enrolled at the Royal Hibernian Academy in Dublin where he studied painting.

Though he had originally planned to study law, Wills preferred the arts. His first novel was Old Times, for which he also drew and engraved the illustrations. After publishing Old Times in an Irish magazine, he travelled to London, and for some time wrote for periodicals without much success. A second novel, The Wife's Evidence was dramatised with some success. Wills then chose to live a bohemian lifestyle, lodging at the Arundel Club. He later joined the Garrick Club.

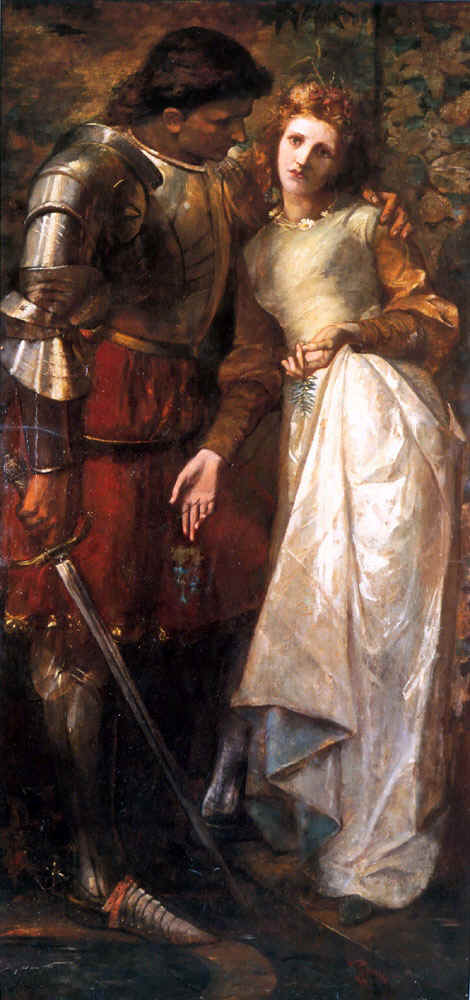
Wills' painting Ophelia and Laertes, Oil on canvas – Private Collection.

For a period, he attempted to make a career as an artist. He set up as a portrait-painter in 1868. He had some success, despite limited artistic training, but his disorderly lifestyle and reputation for missing appointments undermined his career. He also painted narrative works.

== Drama ==
He found his true vein in drama, and produced over 30 plays, after having his first major success with The Man of Airlie (1867), which was shown in London and New York. In 1872 he was engaged by the Lyceum Theatre with an annual salary. Some of his most notable works there were Medea in Corinth, Eugene Aram, Jane Shore, Buckingham, and Olivia, a dramatisation of The Vicar of Wakefield, which had great success. Wills' plays were typically in verse, participating in the revival of verse drama at the time. From this time until 1887 his plays were rarely absent from the London stage.

Many of his plays were based on historical events. Charles I, about the life of the English king, was one of his major successes, running for 200 nights at the Lyceum in 1872–3. Other historical dramas include Mary Queen of Scots and England in the Days of Charles II. These works have been strongly criticised for their freedom with historical fact. Harold Child in The Cambridge History of English and American Literature commented,

His caricature of Oliver Cromwell in Charles I (1872) must strike anyone who has seen or read that play not only as ridiculous, but as a sacrifice of dramatic for theatrical effect; and, to judge from contemporary criticism, his treatment of John Knox in the unpublished Marie Stuart (1874) was no better.

Richard Cordell described Charles I as "an amazing picture of Charles as the guileless prince yoked to a perfect queen, with Cromwell as the heavy villain."

Other plays include Hinko, Juana, Ninon (which ran for eight months at the Adelphi), Claudian, and his adaptation of Faust, which ran for 188 nights in 1885 followed by another long run in 1887–8.

Wills worked regularly with Henry Irving. Irving produced his Vanderdecken in 1878, a version of the Flying Dutchman story. In 1880 he created a revised version of Henrik Hertz's play King René's Daughter under the title Iolanthe. Irving commissioned King Arthur in 1890, but it remained unproduced as Irving was unhappy with the work. He asked J. Comyns Carr to rewrite it. Irving also commissioned a version of Don Quixote but did not produce it.

In 1887 his mother, whom he had supported for many years, died. After that time, Wills seemed to have less incentive for work, and died four years later.

== Other works ==
He wrote several novels after The Wife's Evidence, including Notice to Quit (1863) and The Love That Kills (1867), both of which deal with the aftermath of the Great Famine of Ireland. He also published Life's Foreshadowings and David Chantrey.

Wills' long blank verse narrative poem Melchior, in the manner of Browning, was strongly recommended by Oscar Wilde. It tells the story of a German composer inspired by a young woman whom he imagines to be Saint Cecilia. He also wrote many song lyrics.

== Reputation ==
His biography, W. G. Wills: Dramatist and Painter, was written by his brother Freeman Wills in 1898. However, even by then Wills' reputation was in decline. His works were very rarely revived or read after his death and have been subject to some scathing criticism. Richard Cordell described Broken Spells as "a flatulent Napoleonic piece", adding that Wills "wavered between uninspired verse plays and noisy melodrama". Peter Thomson calls Eugene Aram "semi poetic drivel".

James Joyce alludes to him and to his play A Royal Divorce (concerning Napoleon's divorce from Joséphine) many times in Finnegans Wake.
