= Beckles =

Beckles is a surname of English origin, derived from the market town of Beccles in Suffolk. Notable people with the surname include:

- Albert Beckles (born 1930), American bodybuilder
- Arlene Beckles, American politician
- Edward Beckles (1816–1902), Barbadian clergyman
- Sir Hilary Beckles (born 1955), Barbadian academic
- Ian Beckles (born 1967), Canadian player of American football
- Kanika Beckles (born 1991), Trinidadian sprinter
- Kierre Beckles (born 1990), Barbadian athlete
- Mark Beckles (born 1964), Canadian insurance broker and political candidate
- Pennelope Beckles (born 1961), Trinidadian politician
- Samuel Beckles (1814–1890), English dinosaur hunter
- Omar Beckles, Grenadian footballer
- Yolande Beckles (born 1962), British educator
