= Yolande, Duchess of Lorraine =

Duchess of Lorraine in 1473

Yolande
- Duchess of Lorraine
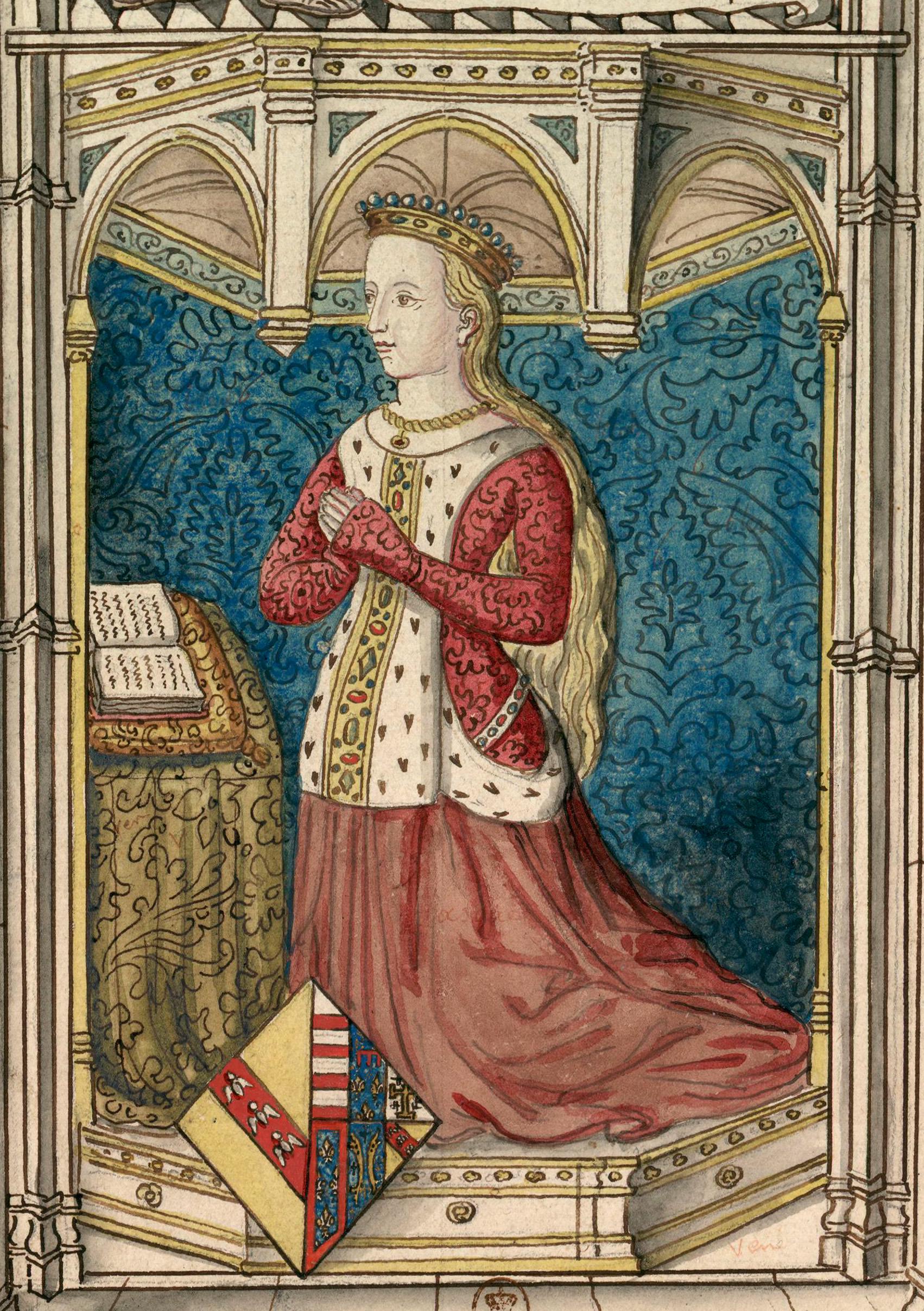
- A 17th-century drawing of a (now-lost) 15th-century stained-glass window depicting Yolande
- Born: 2 November 1428; Nancy
- Died: 23 March 1483 (aged 54); Nancy
- Spouse: Frederick II, Count of Vaudémont (m. 1445; died 1470)
- Issue: René II, Duke of Lorraine; Nicolas, Lord of Joinville; Jeanne, Duchess of Anjou; Yolande, Landgravine of Hesse; Marguerite, Duchess of Alençon
Names
- Yolande de Lorraine
- House: Valois-Anjou
- Father: René, King of Naples
- Mother: Isabella, Duchess of Lorraine

Yolande (2 November 1428 in Nancy – 23 March 1483 in Nancy) was Duchess of Lorraine (1473) and Bar (1480). She was the daughter of Isabella, Duchess of Lorraine, and René of Anjou (King of Naples, Duke of Anjou, Bar and Lorraine, Count of Provence). Though she was nominally in control of major territories, she ceded her power and titles to her husband and her son. In addition, her younger sister was Margaret of Anjou, Queen of England.

In the 19th century, a romanticised version of her early life was popularised by the play King René's Daughter by Henrik Hertz, in which she is portrayed as a beautiful blind princess living in an isolated garden paradise. It was later adapted to Tchaikovsky's opera Iolanta. There is no evidence that she was ever blind.

== Marriage and children ==
In 1445, she married her second cousin Frederick II, Count of Vaudémont (1420–1470), at Nancy. The marriage was a dynastic alliance, arranged to end the dispute which existed between René of Anjou and Frederick's father, Antoine of Vaudémont, regarding the succession to the Duchy of Lorraine.

== Children ==
1. René (future Duke of Lorraine) (1451–1508), Duke of Lorraine. On 1 September 1485 he married, secondly, Philippa of Guelders.
2. Nicolas of Lorraine, Lord of Joinville and Bauffremont, died in 1476.
3. Peter of Lorraine, died in 1451.
4. Jeanne of Lorraine (1458 – 25 January 1480), married in 1474 to Charles IV, Duke of Anjou
5. Yolande of Lorraine, who died in 1500, married in 1497 to William II, Landgrave of Hesse, by whom she had issue.
6. Marguerite of Lorraine (1463–1521), married in 1488 to René, Duke of Alençon (1454–1492)

== Reign ==
In 1473, on the death of her nephew Nicolas, she inherited the Duchy of Lorraine, but passed it immediately to her eldest son René II. In 1480, after the death of her father, she did the same with the Duchy of Bar. She died on 23 March 1483, which was the birthday of her sister Queen Margaret, who had died the previous summer. Yolande was 54 years old.

== Cultural references ==
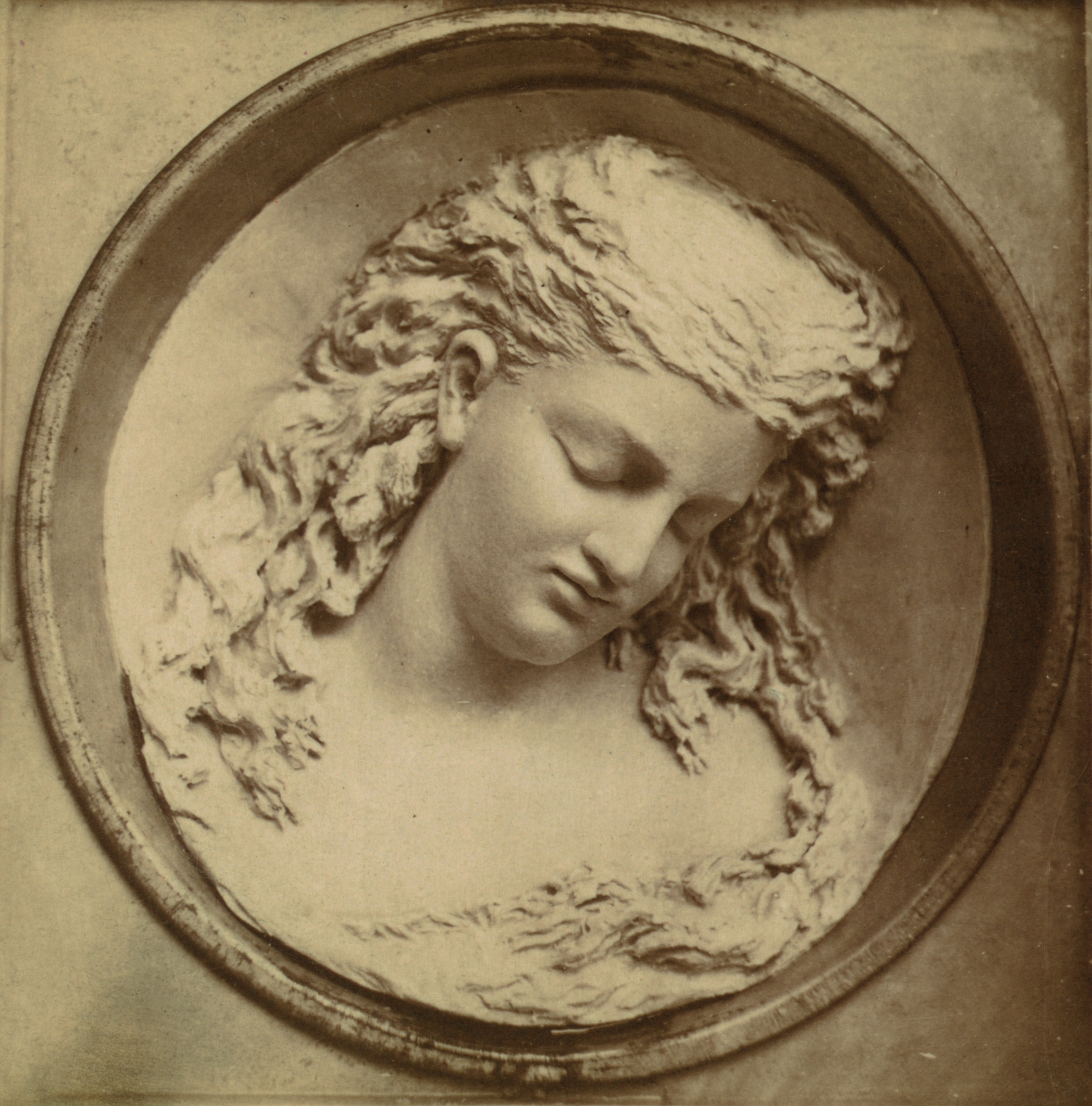
Butter sculpture of "The Dreaming Iolanthe", depicting the blind Yolande, as portrayed in Henrik Hertz's play King René's Daughter, by Caroline Shawk Brooks, 1876

In 1845 the Danish poet Henrik Hertz wrote the poetic drama Kong Renés Datter (King René’s Daughter), a romanticised account of her life, in which she is depicted as a beautiful sixteen-year-old princess who lives in a protected garden paradise. Blinded in a childhood accident, her attendants must keep from her the knowledge that she is blind, while a Moorish physician conducts a long slow medical procedure to restore her sight. Once it is complete, she must be told of her blindness to awaken the desire to see. Count Vaudémont arrives for his arranged marriage, which he resents. He accidentally finds her secret garden, and falls in love with her without knowing who she is. He discovers she is blind, and tells her so, but she cannot understand him. However, the physician is now able to complete the treatment and she is cured.

The portrayal of Yolande as a saintly dreaming beauty (regularly placed in an entranced sleep by the physician) was immensely popular. The play was translated into numerous languages. The Russian translation by Fyodor Miller was adapted by Vladimir Zotov, whose version was used as the basis for the opera Iolanta, written by Tchaikovsky, with libretto by his brother Modest Ilyich Tchaikovsky. It received its premiere on 18 December 1892 in St. Petersburg.

The heroine's name was given as "Iolanthe" in the original Danish version and in the English translation by Theodore Martin, making this version of her name familiar in the 19th century. In 1913 a silent film of Hertz's play was made by the Thanhouser Company, starring Maude Fealy as Yolande. It was also adapted in 1990 as the German film Das Licht der Liebe.

In the pseudohistorical book The Holy Blood and the Holy Grail Yolande de Bar was alleged to have been the tenth Grand Master of the Priory of Sion, succeeding her father, King René. The evidence for this claim was derived from the Dossiers Secrets d'Henri Lobineau, forged documents created in 1967.

== Sources ==
- Kekewich, Margaret L. (2008). The Good King: René of Anjou and Fifteenth Century Europe. Palgrave Macmillan.
- Potter, David (1995). A History of France, 1460-1560: The Emergence of a Nation State. St. Martin's Press.

Yolande, Duchess of Lorraine House of Valois-Anjou Cadet branch of the House of Valois Born: 2 November 1428 Died: 23 March 1483
| Preceded by: Nicholas I | Duchess of Lorraine; 1473 | Succeeded by: René II |
| Preceded by: Rene I of Anjou | Duchess of Bar; 1480 | Succeeded by: René II |
