= Yola =

Yola may refer to:

== Culture ==
- Yola dialect, Forth and Bargy dialect, a dialect of Middle English, historically of County Wexford, Ireland
- Jola people, of Africa

=== Music ===
- Yola (album), a 2001 album by Eleanor McEvoy
- YOLA, Youth Orchestra Los Angeles
- Yowlah, folk dance native to the United Arab Emirates and Oman

== Places ==
- Yola, Nigeria, capital of Adamawa State, Nigeria
  - Yola Airport, airport in the Adamawa State of Nigeria
- Yola North, a Local Government Area of Adamawa State, Nigeria
- Yola South, a Local Government Area of Adamawa State, Nigeria
- Anglican Diocese of Yola, a diocese of the Anglican Church of Nigeria in the Province of Jos
- County of Yola, the original name of Yolo County, California

== People ==
- Yola (singer) (born 1983), English singer-songwriter
- Yola Berrocal (born 1970), Spanish media personality, dancer, singer, and actress
- Yola Cain (1954–2000), Jamaican-born aviator
- Yola d'Avril (1906–1984), French-born actress
- Yola Ramírez (born 1935), Mexican tennis player

== Other uses ==
- Yola (beetle), a genus of beetles
- Yola (webhost), a website hosting company
- Yawl, sailing ship (Spanish: yola)

== See also ==
- Yolanda (disambiguation)
