= Carol Fenner =

American children's writer

- Born: September 30, 1929; North Hornell, New York
- Died: February 16, 2002 (aged 72); Battle Creek, Michigan, USA
- Occupation: Writer
- Writing career
- Period: 1963–2002
- Genres: Children's and young adult fiction
- Notable work: Yolonda's Genius

Carol Elizabeth Fenner (September 30, 1929 – February 16, 2002) was an American children's writer.

Fenner's book Gorilla-Gorilla won a Christopher Award and The Skates of Uncle Richard won honors from the Coretta Scott King Award. In addition, she was twice a runner-up for the Newbery Award: once each for Gorilla-Gorilla and Yolonda's Genius. Just prior to her death, Yolonda's Genius was optioned by a major studio for possible production of a movie for television.

== Bibliography ==
- Tigers in the Cellar (1963)
- Christmas Tree on the Mountain (1966)
- Lagalag, the Wanderer (1968)
- Gorilla-Gorilla (1973) - "Fenner has turned a reading of Schaller's Year of the Gorilla and her own zoo observations into a sound and vividly empathic account, and Shimin's soft gray drawings reiforce the mood of her prose."
- The Skates of Uncle Richard (1978) - "The book fairly oozes earnestness but Marsha's wobbly-ankle misery and ensuing satisfaction are not to be denied."
- A Summer Of Horses (1989) - "Horse fans will read almost any horse book once, but there are a few stories that equine enthusiasts will return to again and again. This thoughtful novel is just such a book..."
- Randall's Wall (1991)
- Yolonda's Genius (1995) - "Fenner's (Randall's Wall) pace is sometimes too leisurely, but her heartwarming story merits acclaim for its fresh premise and forceful characterizations."
- King of Dragons (1998)
- Snowed-in With Grandmother Silk (2004, posthumously)
