= King René's Daughter =

Play written by Henrik Hertz

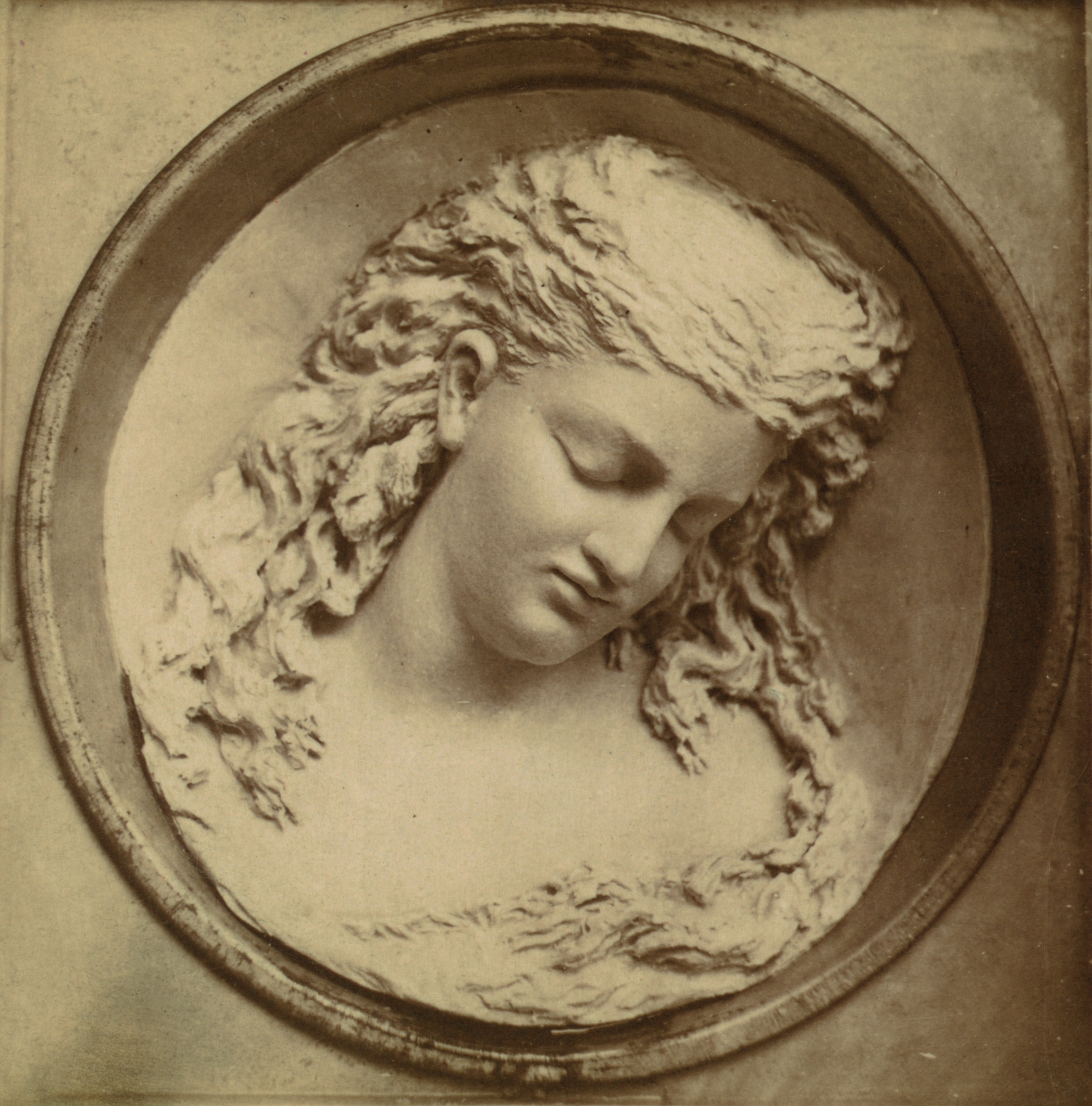
- An 1876 Butter sculpture by Caroline S. Brooks of "The Dreaming Iolanthe", depicting the blind Iolanthe, as portrayed in King René's Daughter
- Written by: Henrik Hertz
- Characters: Iolanthe; Tristan, Count Vaudement; René of Anjou; Geoffrey; Almerick; Ebn Jahia; Bertrand; Martha
- Original language: Danish
- Subject: Fictionalised account of the marriage of Iolanda, daughter of René of Anjou and Frederick II, Count of Vaudémont
- Genre: romance
- Setting: Medieval Provence

Premiere
- Date premiered: 1845

Kong Renés Datter (King René’s Daughter) is a Danish verse drama written in 1845 by Henrik Hertz. It is a fictional account of the early life of Yolande of Lorraine, daughter of René of Anjou, in which she is depicted as a beautiful blind sixteen-year-old princess who lives in a protected garden paradise. The play was highly popular in the 19th century. It was translated into many languages, copied, parodied and adapted. The Russian adaptation by Vladimir Zotov was used as the basis for the 1892 opera Iolanta, written by Tchaikovsky, with libretto by his brother Modest Ilyich Tchaikovsky.

The name of the central character is given as "Iolanthe" in the original and in early English versions.

== Characters ==
- King René of Naples, Count of Provence
- Iolanthe, his daughter
- Tristan, Count of Vaudémont
- Sir Geoffrey of Orange, Tristan's friend
- Sir Almerick, a knight in René's court
- Ebn Jahia, a Moorish physician
- Bertrand, guardian of Iolanthe's garden
- Martha, his wife

== Plot ==
At the entrance to a hidden garden in a beautiful Provençal valley, Bertrand, guardian of the garden, explains to Sir Almerick that no one may enter because the king's daughter Iolanthe lives there in seclusion. Her blindness has been kept secret from all but a few confidants; it has been put out that she is living in a convent. Even Iolanthe does not understand that she is blind because no one is allowed to speak of it to her. Nor does she know she is a princess. She was blinded in an accident in infancy and has been attended ever since by the Moorish physician Ebn Jahia, who each day places her in an enchanted sleep and attends to her eyes while she is unconscious. He has predicted that, with a combination of medication, magic and astrology, she will be cured when she is 16. This is also when she is due to marry Tristan, Count of Vaudémont, who is unaware of her condition. Iolanthe has just passed her 16th birthday. Bertrand's wife Martha says that Iolanthe has grown up happy, spending her time in song and poetry, and that she will not be able to understand what sight is. Sir Almerick informs Bertrand that Count Tristan is on his way to Provence to marry Iolanthe.

King René and Ebn Jahia arrive. The physician says that Iolanthe should soon be able to see, but first she must be told that she is blind and made to understand what sight is. René does not want his daughter's happiness and innocence to be broken. Ebn Jahia explains that the body and the spirit are intertwined, insisting that Iolanthe must be psychologically prepared for sight. King René agonises over his decision, while Ebn Jahia puts Iolanthe to sleep using a magical amulet. The two leave.

Tristan enters the garden telling his friend Geoffrey that he does not want to marry a woman he has never seen and is only willing to do so from a sense of duty. Tristan sees the sleeping Iolanthe and immediately falls in love with her. Geoffrey thinks he has been enchanted. Tristan picks up the amulet and prepares to leave, but Iolanthe wakes, calling for Bertrand and Martha. Geoffrey and Tristan introduce themselves, and Iolanthe makes them a drink. The three young people sing troubadour songs to each other. Tristan sends Geoffrey to bring their troops to guard the pass leading to the valley. Iolanthe and Tristan talk together. He discovers she is blind when she fails to distinguish a white from a red rose. He tries to explain light and colour to her, but she cannot understand him. He declares his love for her and says he will find her father and ask him for her hand in marriage.

Iolanthe tells Bertrand and Martha that a mysterious stranger has awakened in her confusing new ideas and feelings. René and Ebn Jahia arrive, and the king tries to explain to Iolanthe what blindness is. She is perplexed, but Ebn Jahia says that the cure can now be successfully completed and leads Iolanthe away. Sir Almerick arrives with a letter from Tristan stating that he can no longer marry Iolanthe as he has found his true love. René is astounded. Tristan and Geoffrey arrive wearing armour. They say their army has taken control of the valley and demand to know who René is. He tells them he is the king. Tristan states that he loves the girl who lives in the garden. René explains that she is Iolanthe, his own daughter and Tristan's fiancée. Ebn Jahia returns with Iolanthe, who has been cured, and everyone rejoices.

== Background ==
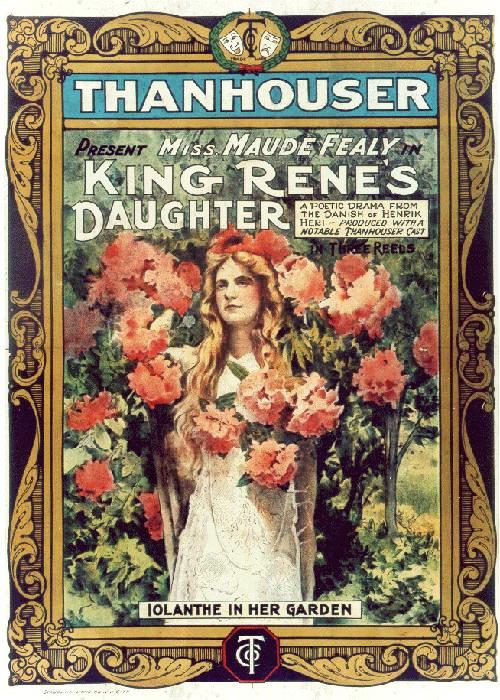
Poster for the 1913 film

The story is based on the life of Yolande, daughter of King René of Anjou, who married her cousin Frederick II, Count of Vaudémont in 1445. The marriage was a dynastic alliance, arranged to end the dispute which existed between René of Anjou and Frederick's father, Antoine of Vaudémont, regarding the succession to the Duchy of Lorraine. Beyond these facts, the play is fictional. The Count of Vaudémont's given name is altered to "Tristan". The central conceit of Iolanthe's blindness is entirely invented.

Subjects related to the court of René were familiar in the Romantic and Victorian period. René had been idealised in the Romantic era as a poet-king, whose court in Provence was a genteel haven of literature, architecture and art in a violent era. This image was first popularised in Walter Scott's 1829 novel Anne of Geierstein.

== Influence and adaptations ==
The portrayal of Yolande in Hertz's play as a saintly dreaming beauty (regularly placed in an entranced sleep by the physician) was immensely popular. The play was translated into other languages.

There were several English translations, including by Jane Frances Chapman (1845), Edmund Phipps (1848), and Theodore Martin (1850). The heroine's name was retained from the original as "Iolanthe". The piece was produced in London several times, including at the Strand Theatre in 1849; later by Charles Kean at the Haymarket Theatre; and in 1876 at the Lyceum Theatre by Henry Irving's company in Martin's version, starring Helena Faucit Martin in the title role and Irving as Count Tristan. A version of the play adapted by W.G. Wills was performed by Irving's company at the Lyceum in 1880 under the title "Iolanthe", starring Ellen Terry in the title role and Irving as Count Tristan. An unrelated 1882 Gilbert and Sullivan opera was titled Iolanthe after W. S. Gilbert asked his producer, Richard D'Oyly Carte, to request Irving's permission to use the name. A musical version of the play itself had already been created in 1871 as a cantata by Henry Smart, setting a verse adaptation by Frederick Enoch.

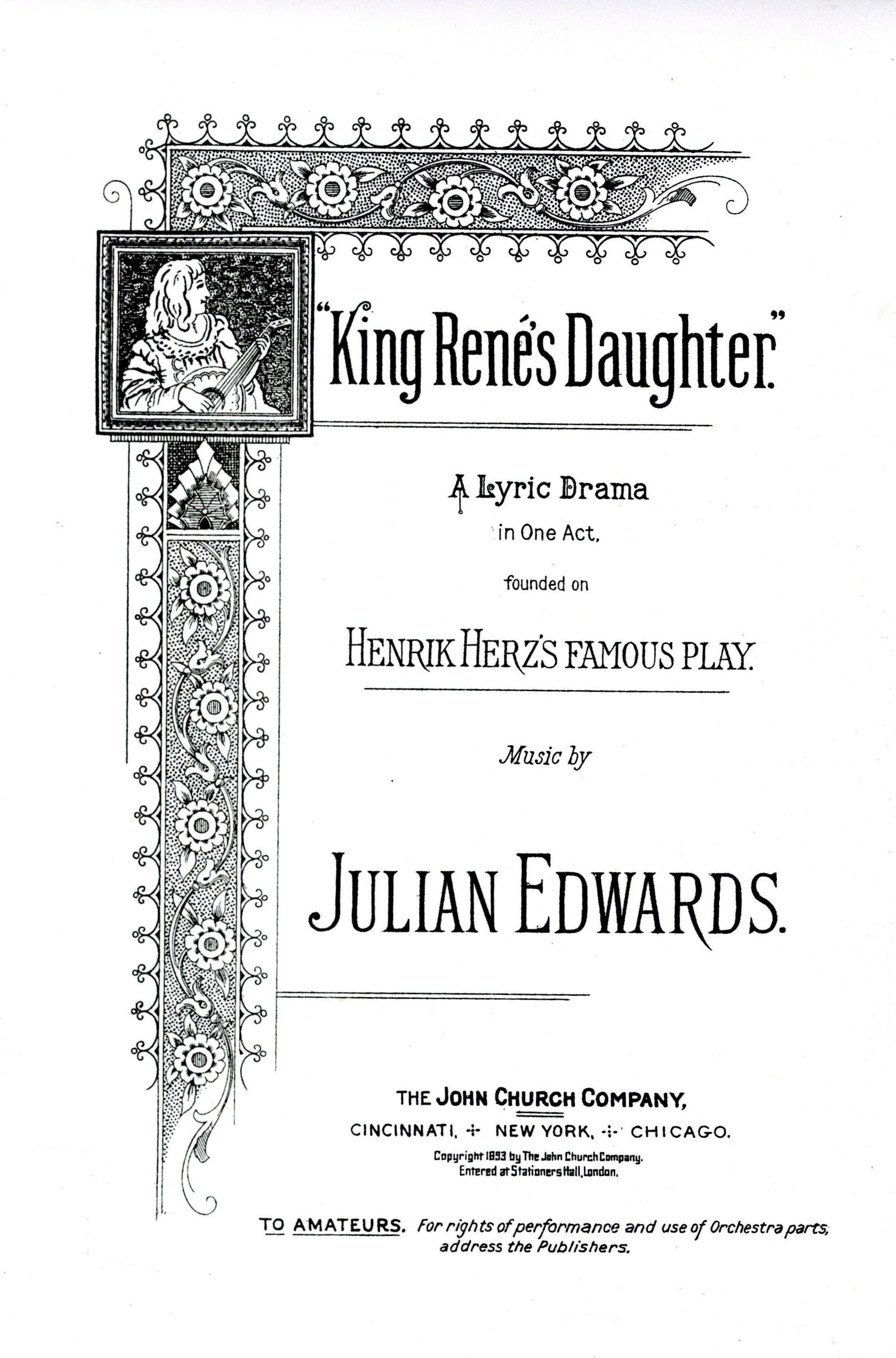
Front page of the score for Edwards' 1893 musical

The Russian translation was by Fyodor Miller. An adaptation by Vladimir Zotov expanded the plot. This version was used as the basis for the opera Iolanta, written by Tchaikovsky to a libretto by his brother, Modest Ilyich Tchaikovsky. It received its premiere on 18 December 1892 in St. Petersburg. In this version much of the magical material in the original is eliminated, making Ebn Jahia more of a scientist than sorcerer. A new character, Robert, Duke of Burgundy, is introduced to replace Geoffrey. Robert becomes Iolanthe's original unwilling fiancé, who happily relinquishes Iolanthe to his friend Vaudémont.

In 1893 a new musical version of the drama, by the light opera composer Julian Edwards, was published in America and performed with limited success on Broadway.

In 1913 a silent film of Hertz's play was made by the Thanhouser Company, starring Maude Fealy as Iolanthe. It was also adapted in 1990 as the German film Das Licht der Liebe (The Light of Love).
