= Yolande of Dreux =

Yolande of Dreux (French: Yolande de Dreux) may refer to:

- Yolande de Dreux (1196–1239), wife of Raoul II of Lusignan
- Yolande of Dreux, Duchess of Burgundy (1212-1248), wife of Hugh IV of Burgundy
- Yolande de Dreux, Countess of Penthièvre and of Porhoet (1218- 10 October 1272), wife of Hugh XI of Lusignan
- Yolande of Dreux, Queen of Scotland (1263-1330), wife of Alexander III, King of Scots
