= Yolanda Vega (presenter) =

Retired American lottery host

Yolanda Vega (born Yolanda Antequera on December 10, 1955) is a retired American television presenter who was the master of ceremonies for televised New York Lottery drawings between 1990 and 2022. She is most commonly known for her emphatic pronunciation of her own name at the beginning and end of her television appearances.

== Early life and career ==
Vega was born in Brooklyn, New York, on December 10, 1955. She grew up as the third-eldest of six daughters of Puerto Rican parents in Red Hook, Brooklyn. At age 15, she modeled for the Abraham & Straus department store and walked the runway at the Brooklyn Academy of Music. After graduating from Hunter College with a degree in economics, she worked as a bookkeeper in the Albany metropolitan area. Despite having no acting or presenting experience, she auditioned for a television role with the state's lottery at age 34, and was offered the job.

Six months into the job, she started introducing herself with an emphatic, Puerto Rican pronunciation of her name, which became her trademark. Oprah Winfrey imitated Vega's pronunciation of her own name when Vega appeared on her show in 1994. The lottery commissioned bobblehead dolls of Vega, which were given to scratch ticket buyers. Wendy Williams, on her talk show, described Vega as "a New York icon." Vega became known as the "Lottery Queen" for her television work. In 2018, she was one of five television presenters for the lottery; her tasks included counseling winners who were nervous before appearing on television, training new announcers, and directing programs when she was not on camera.

Vega announced her retirement in January 2022, citing a desire to spend more time with her family, particularly her first grandson, who at the time was five months old.

In February 2023, Vega and her family appeared on Family Feud.

In May 2023, Vega appeared on episode 126 of the Hey Babe podcast hosted by Impractical Joker Sal Vulcano and comedian Chris Distefano.
