= Yolonda L. Colson =

Thoracic Surgeon

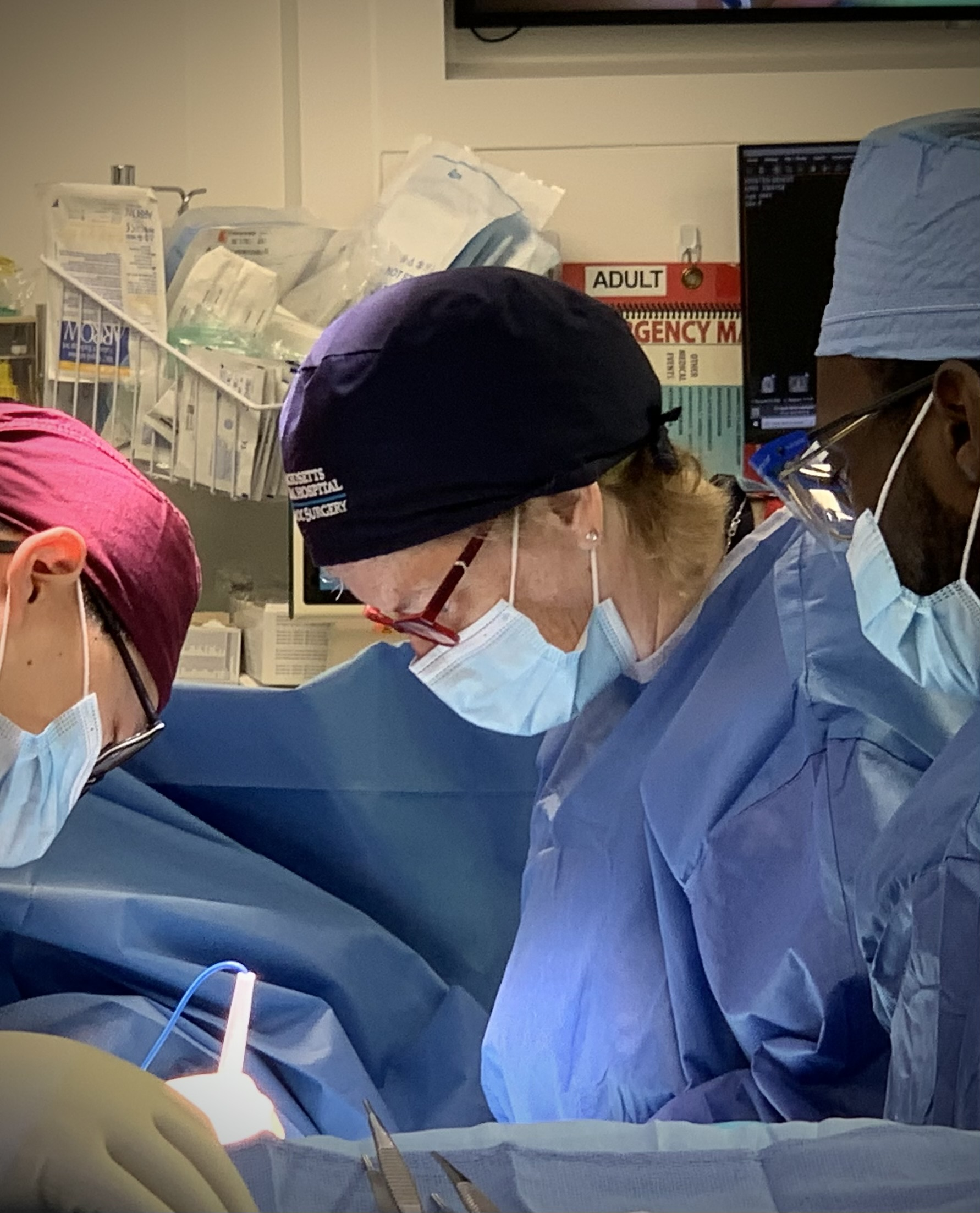
- Colson (center) intraoperatively teaching
- Education: Mayo Medical School (MD) University of Pittsburgh School of Medicine (PhD and surgery residency) Harvard Medical School Brigham and Women's Hospital (fellowship in cardiothoracic surgery)
- Known for: First female president of the American Association for Thoracic Surgery
- Medical career
- Profession: Thoracic Surgeon
- Institutions: Harvard Medical School
- Research: Polymer and nanoparticle drug delivery to prevent cancer recurrence; Methods to identify hidden tumor spreading to nearby lymph nodes

Yolonda Lorig Colson is an American thoracic surgeon, working in Boston, who was the 103rd president and first female president of the American Association for Thoracic Surgery (AATS), succeeding Shaf Keshavjee and preceding Lars Georg Svensson. Colson is the Chief of the Division of Thoracic Surgery at Massachusetts General Hospital, Hermes C. Grillo Professor in Thoracic Surgery, and Professor of Surgery at Harvard Medical School. Colson is an Officer and Exam Chair for the American Board of Thoracic Surgery. She is also a collaborator of the Grinstaff Group.

== Education ==
Colson completed her Bachelor of Science (B.S.) in Biomedical Engineering from Rensselaer Polytechnic Institute, Doctor of Medicine (M.D.) from Mayo Medical School, and Doctor of Philosophy (Ph.D.) and general surgery residency at the University of Pittsburgh School of Medicine. She then completed a fellowship in cardiothoracic surgery at Brigham and Women's Hospital.

== Awards and recognitions ==
- 103rd president of the American Association for Thoracic Surgery (AATS)
- George H.A. Clowes, Jr. Research Career Development Award from the American College of Surgeons (ACS) (2006-2011)
- Edward M. Kennedy Award for Health Care Innovation from CIMIT
- First recipient of Michele Kessler Leadership Award in Women's Health (2006)
- AATS Alton Ochsner Research Scholarship
- Above and Beyond Award, Employer Support of the Guard and Reserve, US (2009)
- Maxwell Resident Career-Research Award (1998-1999)

In 2010 Colson was recognized by the Lung Cancer Alliance for her work "Out of the Shadows", a women's health policy and advocacy program regarding lung cancer in women. In 2020 Colson was interviewed by CTSNet after she was elected as the Vice President of the AATS. Colson is mentioned several Castle Connolly Medical publications.

In 2020, she was elected to the National Academy of Medicine.

=== Other accomplishments ===
Colson is a co-inventor on six patents.

- Monoclonal antibodies to antigens expressed by hematopoietic facilitatory cells, (2000).
- Films and particles, (2010).
- Films and particles, (2012).
- Films and particles, (2012).
- Compliant composites for application of drug-eluting coatings to tissue surfaces, (2014).
- Polymeric depots for localization of agent to biological sites, (2019).

She founded the Women's Lung Cancer Forum[. She is the author of many journal articles and textbook chapters, including the text "Adult Chest Surgery".
