= Jolanta =

Jolanta (or Jolantha) is a Czech, Lithuanian, Polish and Slovak form of the Greek name Iolanthe. It is derived from Greek words ιολη (iole) "violet" and ανθος (anthos) "flower". Similar names also derived from Iolanthe are Yolande, Jolanda and Yolanda.

Jolanta is a given name. Notable people with the name include:

- Jolanta Antas (born 1954), Polish scientist and professor of linguistics at the Jagiellonian University of Kraków
- Jolanta Bartczak (born 1964), Polish long jumper
- Jolanta Bebel-Rzymowska (born 1950), Polish fencer
- Jolanta Danielak (born 1955), Polish politician, a member of the Democratic Left Alliance and, previously SdRP
- Jolanta Dičkutė (born 1970), Lithuanian politician and Member of the European Parliament for the Labour Party
- Jolanta Dukure (born 1979), Latvian race walker
- Jolanta Hibner (born 1951), Polish politician
- Jolanta Janota (born 1964), Polish track and field sprinter
- Jolanta Królikowska (born 1960), Polish fencer
- Jolanta Kvašytė (born 1956), Lithuanian painter
- Jolanta Kwaśniewska (born 1955), Polish lawyer and charity activist and former First Lady of Poland
- Jolanta Łukaszewicz (born 1966), Polish sprint canoeist
- Jolanta Niezgodzka (born 1991), Polish politician
- Jolanta Polikevičiūtė (born 1970), Lithuanian road cyclist
- Jolanta Sobierańska-Grenda (born 1973), Polish politician
- Jolanta Szczypińska (1957–2018), Polish politician
- Jolanta Szymanek-Deresz (1954–2010), Polish politician
- Jolanta Wadowska-Król (1939–2023), Polish pediatrician
- Jolanta Zawadzka (born 1987), Polish chess player

It may also refer to:

- Jolenta of Poland (1235–1298), also referred to as Jolanta, Yolande and Yolanda

Media related to Jolanta (given name) at Wikimedia Commons
