= Yolandi =

Yolandi is a given name. People with that name include:

- Yolandi Visser (born 1984), female vocalist in the South African rap-rave group Die Antwoord
- Yolandi van der Westhuizen (born 1981), international cricketer for South Africa
- Yolandi Potgieter (born 1989), South African cricketer
- Yolandi Du Toit (born 1985), road cyclist from South Africa

== See also ==
- Yolanda (disambiguation)
