= Iolanda Cintura =

Mozambican chemist and politician

Iolanda Maria Pedro Campos Cintura Seuane (born 24 October 1972) is a Mozambican chemist and politician who served as Minister for Women and Social Affairs from 2010 to 2014 and has been governor of the capital city Maputo since 2015.

== Early life and education ==
Cintura was born on 24 October 1972 in Vila Pery (now Chimoio), Manica Province. She attended primary school in Beira before moving to Maputo for her secondary schooling. She studied chemistry at Eduardo Mondlane University, graduating in 1999. She also received certificates in fuel management from the Norwegian Petroleum Institute (1999), energy relations from the United States Department of Energy (2001) and management from the Pedagogical University of Maputo (2007 and 2011).

== Career ==
Cintura is a member of the Mozambique Liberation Front and held various positions in the Ministry of Energy from 2000 until 2010. On 15 January 2010, she was appointed to the cabinet by President Armando Guebuza as Minister for Women and Social Affairs. In this capacity, she made a statement to the United Nations Commission on the Status of Women in New York City in 2012. In April 2013, she hosted the Southern African Development Community's meeting of ministers responsible for gender and women's affairs in Maputo.

After the 2014 presidential election, Filipe Nyusi did not keep Cintura in the cabinet, but in January 2015 appointed her as governor of Maputo.

Cintura has been a member of the National AIDS Council since 2010 and is president of the National Council for the Advancement of Women.

== Personal life ==
Cintura is married to Mário Seuane and has two children.
