= Butter stamp =

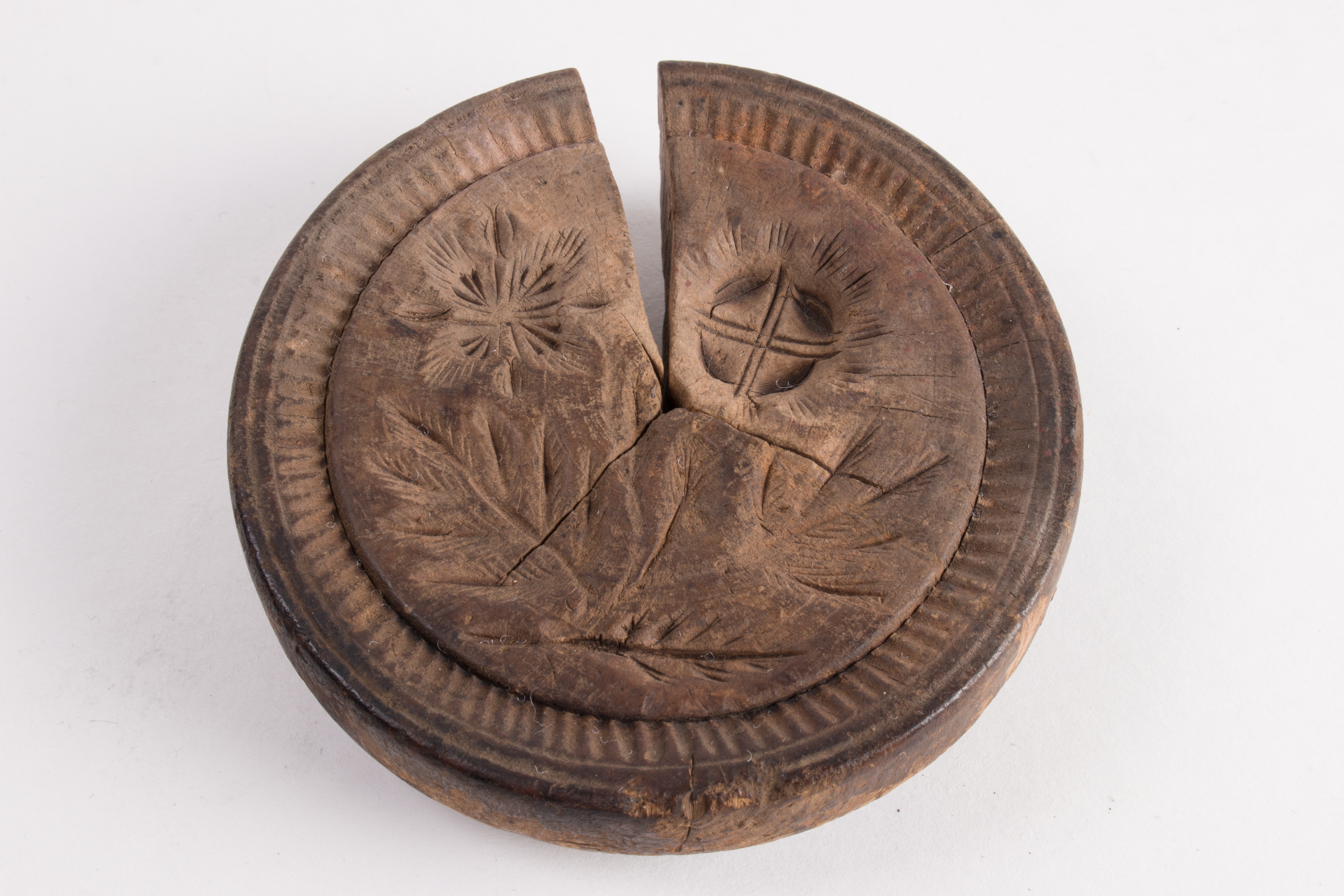
British butter stamp featuring a thistle, held in the Auckland War Memorial Museum

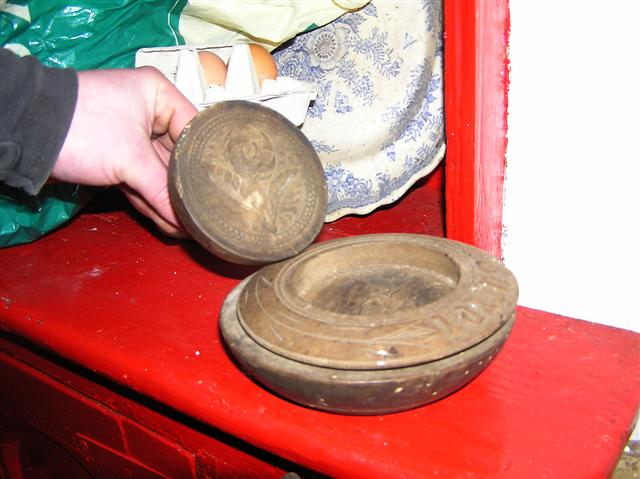
Irish butter stamp, with mould for the block, and below a bain-marie for hot water to soften the butter

A butter stamp or butter print is a device for stamping or shaping a design onto a block of warm butter.

Butter stamps were sometimes commercial but usually purely decorative and applied in homes. They were typically made of wood and feature simple designs of cows, flowers or geometric patterns and, if commercial, the name of the retailer.

Often, they formed part of a box-like mould for forming the whole block. Other designs achieved the same effect by carving the design at the bottom of a butter mould. Part of the intent for commercial moulds and stamps was to demonstrate consistency in the quantity of butter sold.
