= Jolanda Kroesen =

Dutch softball player (born 1979)

- Outfielder
- Born: 2 May 1979 (age 45); Purmerend, North Holland, Netherlands
- Bats: Right Throws: Right
Medals
Women's softball
Representing Netherlands
Women's Softball European Championship
Silver medal – second place	2007 Amsterdam	Team
Bronze medal – third place	2001 Prague	Team
Bronze medal – third place	2003 Saronno	Team

Jolanda Kroesen (born 2 May 1979) is a Dutch former softball player, who represented the Dutch national team in international competitions.

== Career ==
Kroesen played for Flying Petrols until 1996 and since 1997 until her retirement in 2010 for Sparks Haarlem. She was an outfielder who batted and threw right-handed.

== International career ==
She competed for the Dutch national team since 2001. She participated in the 2001 European Championship, where the Netherlands won the bronze medal and she In she was named MVP of the tournament. She was also part of the team that won the bronze at the 2003 European Championship and the silver medal at the 2007 European Championship.

She was selected as part of the Dutch team that participated in the softball tournament at the 2008 Summer Olympics in Beijing, where the Netherlands finished last with a 1–6 record. She played in six games, recording one run, two hits and one RBI in 13 at bats.
