= Iolanda Batallé =

Catalan writer, journalist, publisher and teacher

Iolanda Batallé i Prats
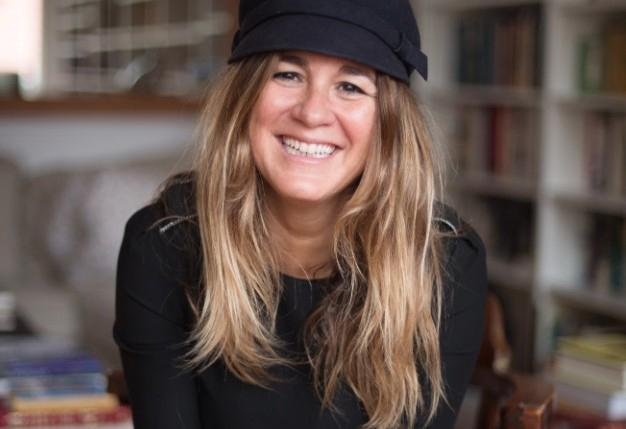
- Born: 1971 (age 53–54); Barcelona
- Known for: writer and editor
- Notable work: El límit exacte dels nostres cossos

Iolanda Batallé (born 1971, in Barcelona) is a Catalan writer and editor. She was the Director of Institut Ramon Llull between 2018 and 2021. She is now director of Ona Llibres since 2022.

== Biography ==
Born in Barcelona in 1971, Batallé is a Graduate in English Philology (University of Barcelona and University of Southampton) and has a Master's in Business Administration from the ESADE Business School and the University of Berkeley.

Since 1990, she has collaborated with several media bodies such as El Observador, Diari de Girona, COM Ràdio and RAC 1. She was Editor and Head of Press at Random House Mondadori (until 2009).

Since 2009, she has been Editorial Director of the La Galera and Bridge imprints of the Enciclopèdia Catalana Group. Since 2016, Batallé has also been Editor and Founder of: Rata and Catedral, of the same publishing group.

She has been also serving as a Professor of Master in Publishing and Master in Literary Creation at Universitat Pompeu Fabra since 2008 and 2016 respectively.

She has previously been a Professor of Spanish and Latin American Literature in California.

As a writer, she has published the novel La memòria de les formigues (The Memory of Ants) in 2009, and, in 2011, El límit exacte dels nostres cossos (The Precise Limit of Our Bodies), a collection of stories. In 2013, her novel Faré tot el que tu vulguis (I Will Do Whatever You Want) won the Prudenci Bertrana prize.
