= Jolanda Spirig =

Swiss historian and writer (born 1953)

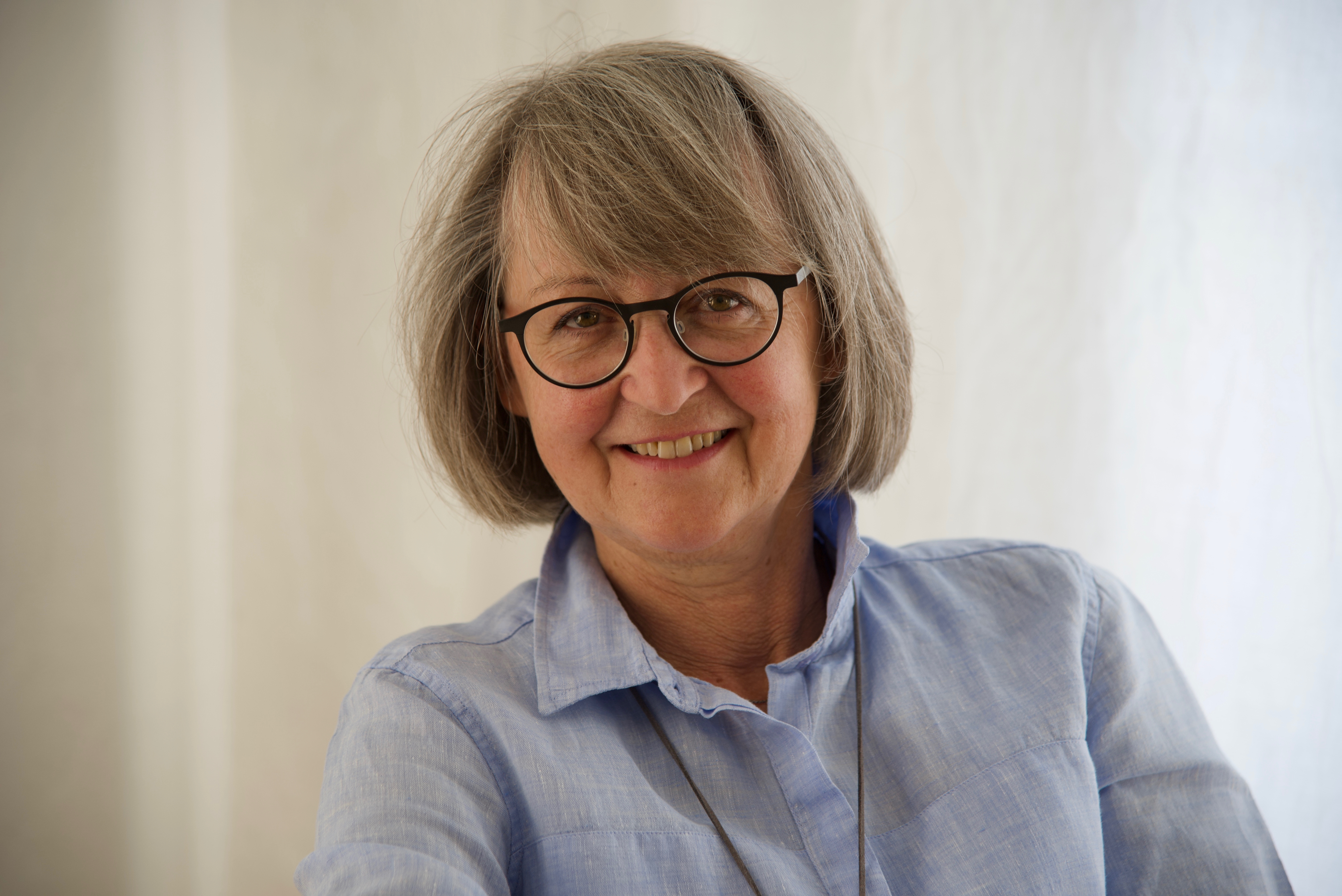
Jolanda Spirig.jpg

Jolanda Spirig (born 26 July 1953, in St. Gallen) is a Swiss historian, writer, translator, and editor best known for her numerous books on women's history and Swiss history, having been awarded a Prix Wasserfrau in 2006 and the Rhine Valley Culture Prize in 2012.
