= Henrik Hertz =

Danish poet (1797–1870)

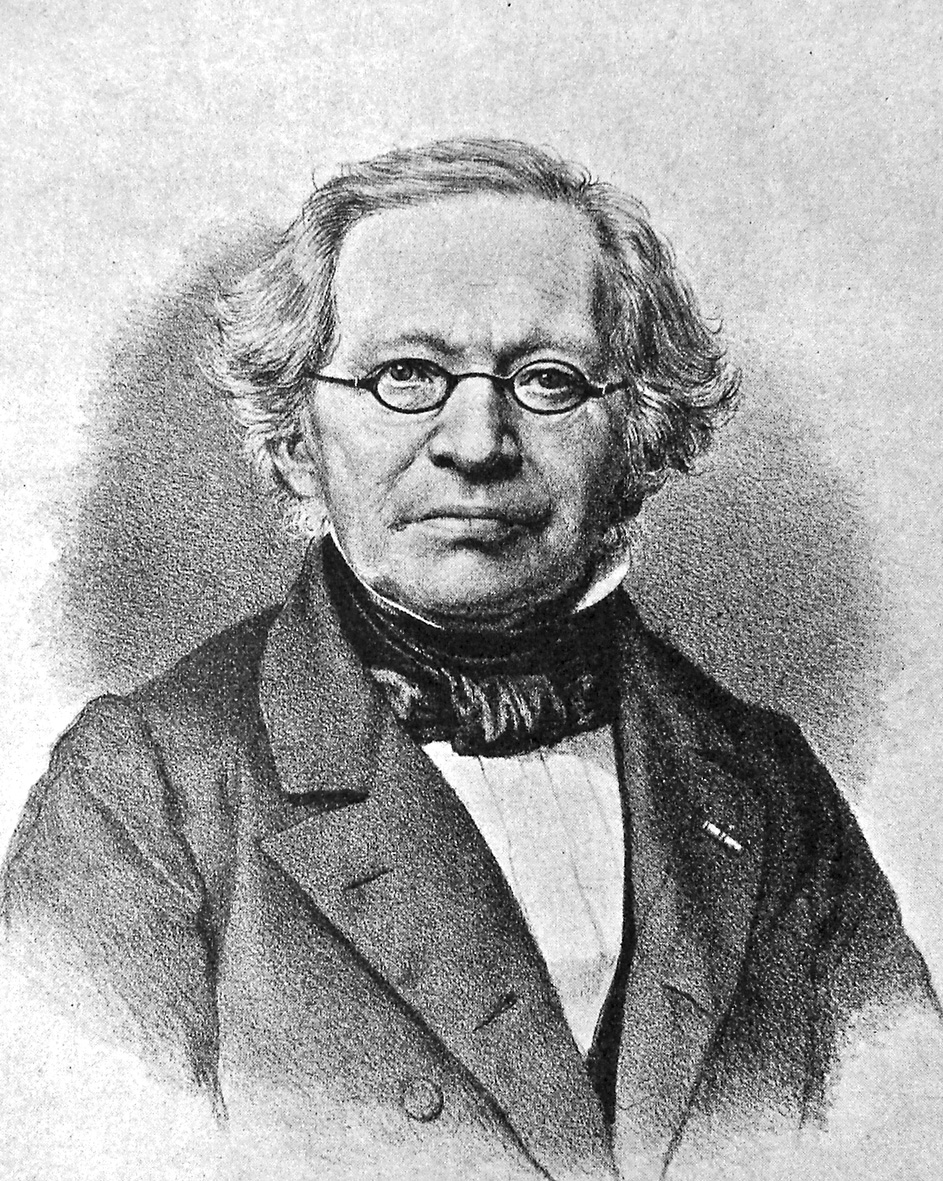
- Born: 25 August 1797; Copenhagen
- Died: 25 February 1870 (aged 72); Copenhagen

Henrik Hertz (25 August 1797 – 25 February 1870) was a Danish poet.

== Biography ==
He was born of Jewish parents in Copenhagen. In 1817 he was sent to the university. His father died in his infancy, and the family property was destroyed in the bombardment of 1807. The boy was brought up by his relative M.L. Nathanson, a well-known newspaper editor.

Young Hertz passed his examination in law in 1825. He lived in the South of France. But his taste was all for literature, and in 1826-1827 two plays of his were produced, Hr. Burchardt og hans Familie (Mr. Burchardt and his Family) and Kjærlighed og Politi (Love and Policy); in 1828 followed the comedy of Flyttedagen (Moving Day). In 1830 he brought out what was a complete novelty in Danish literature, a comedy in rhymed verse, Amors Genistreger (Cupid's Strokes of Genius).

In the same year Hertz published anonymously Gjengangerbrevene (Letters from a Ghost), which he pretended were written by Jens Immanuel Baggesen, who had died in 1826. The book was written in defence of Johan Ludvig Heiberg, and was full of satirical humour and fine critical insight. Its success was overwhelming; but Hertz preserved his anonymity, and the secret was not known until many years later.

In 1832, he published a didactic poem, Naturen og Kunsten (Nature and Art), and Four Poetical Epistles. En Dag paa Øen Als (A Day on the Island of Als) was his next comedy, followed in 1835 by Den eneste Fejl (The Only Fault). Hertz passed through Germany and Switzerland into Italy in 1833; he spent the winter there, and returned the following autumn through France to Denmark.

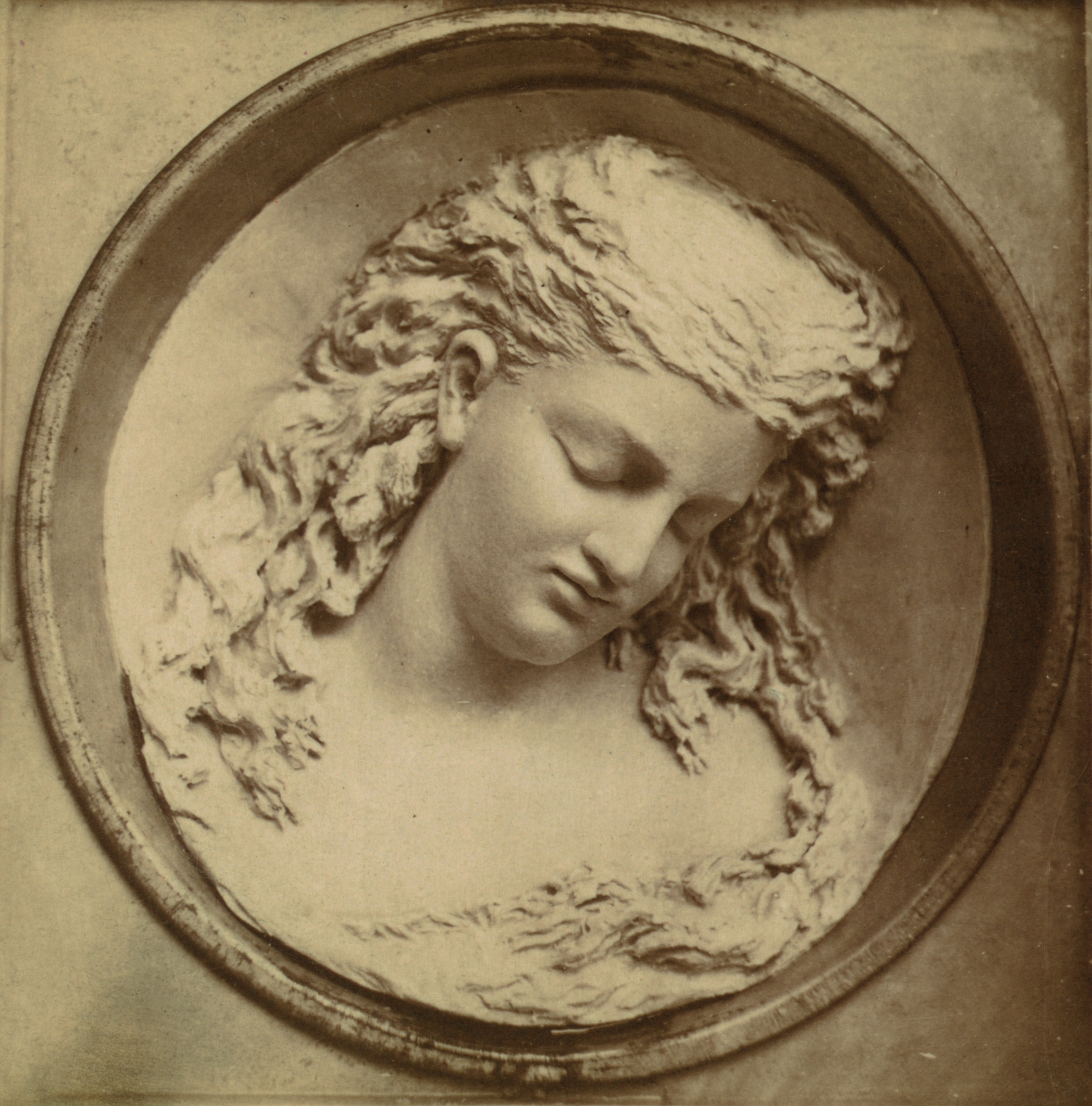
Butter sculpture of "The Dreaming Iolanthe" from Henrik Hertz's play King René's Daughter, by Caroline Shawk Brooks, 1876

In 1836 his comedy Sparekassen (The Savings Bank) enjoyed a great success. But it was not until 1837 that he gave the full measure of his genius in the romantic national drama of Svend Dyrings Huus (Svend Dyring's House), a beautiful and original piece. His historical tragedy Valdemar Atterdag (Valdemar IV) was not so well received in 1839; but in 1845 he achieved an immense success with his lyrical drama Kong Renés Datter (King René's Daughter), which has been translated into almost every European language, and was adapted by Tchaikovsky into his opera Iolanta. This was a highly romanticized account of the life of Yolande, Duchess of Lorraine. To this succeeded the tragedy of Ninon in 1848, the romantic comedy of Tonietta in 1849, Et Offer (A Sacrifice) in 1853, and Den yngste (The Youngest) in 1854.

His lyrical poems appeared in successive collections, dated 1832, 1840 and 1844. From 1858 to 1859 he edited a literary journal entitled Ugentlige Blader (Weekly Pages). His last drama, Tre Dage i Padua (Three Days in Padua), was produced in 1869, and he died on 25 February of the next year.

Hertz is one of the first of Danish lyrical poets. His poems are full of colour and passion, his versification has more witch-craft in it than any other poet's of his age, and his style is grace itself. He has all the sensuous fire of Keats without his proclivity to the antique.

As a romantic dramatist he is scarcely less original. He has bequeathed to the Danish theatre, in Svend Dyrings Huus and King René's Datter, two pieces which have become classic. He is a troubadour by instinct; he has little or nothing of Scandinavian local colouring, and succeeds best when he is describing the scenery or the emotions of the glowing south.

His Dramatic Works (18 vols) were published at Copenhagen in 1854–1873; and his Poems (4 vols) in 1851–1862.
