= 509 Iolanda =

Main-belt asteroid

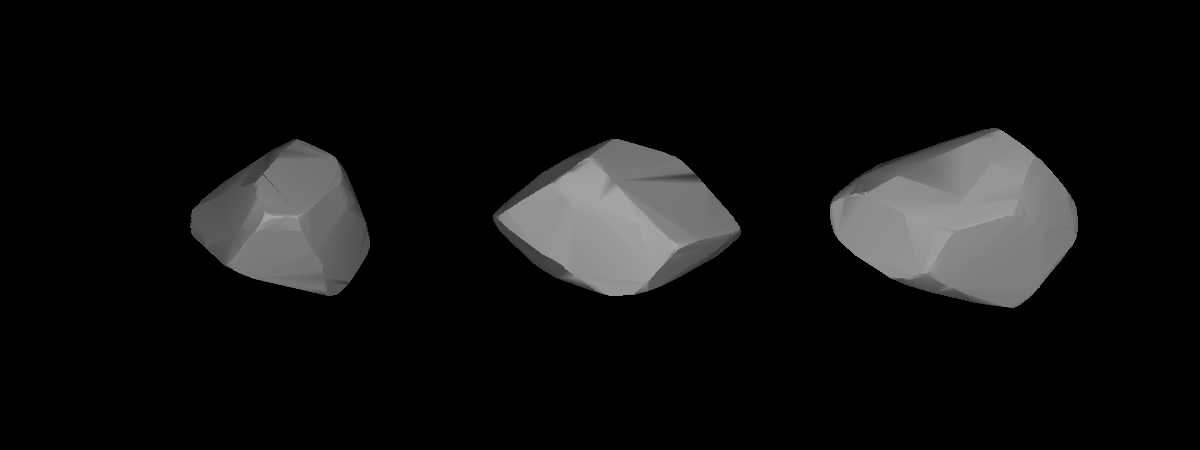
- A three-dimensional model of 509 Iolanda based on its light curve

Discovery
- Discovered by: Max Wolf
- Discovery site: Heidelberg
- Discovery date: 28 April 1903

Designations
- Pronunciation: Italian: [joˈlanda]
- Alternative designations: 1903 LR

Orbital characteristics
- Epoch 31 July 2016 (JD 2457600.5)
- Uncertainty parameter 0
- Observation arc: 112.97 yr (41263 d)
- Aphelion: 3.3534 AU (501.66 Gm)
- Perihelion: 2.7718 AU (414.66 Gm)
- Semi-major axis: 3.0626 AU (458.16 Gm)
- Eccentricity: 0.094960
- Orbital period (sidereal): 5.36 yr (1957.6 d)
- Mean anomaly: 249.896°
- Mean motion: 0° 11^{m} 2.004^{s} / day
- Inclination: 15.410°
- Longitude of ascending node: 217.547°
- Argument of perihelion: 157.882°

Physical characteristics
- Mean radius: 26.495±1.85 km
- Synodic rotation period: 12.306 h (0.5128 d)
- Geometric albedo: 0.2747±0.043
- Absolute magnitude (H): 8.40

509 Iolanda is a minor planet orbiting the Sun.
