= Yolonda's Genius =

- First edition
- Author: Carol Fenner
- Language: English
- Genre: Children's literature
- Publisher: Aladdin Paperbacks
- Publication date: 1995
- Publication place: United States
- Media type: Print
- Pages: 211 pp
- ISBN: 0689821727
- OCLC: 704446749

Yolonda's Genius is a Newbery Honor book written by Carol Fenner and published in 1995 by Aladdin Paperbacks. It was also a Rebecca Caudill Young Reader's Book Award Nominee in 1998.

== Plot ==
The book begins with the main character Yolonda and her family living in Chicago. She is big and tough for her age, which makes it easy for her to look after her little brother Andrew. The prevalence of drugs in the city result in Andrew coming home one day with a pocket full of cocaine. This drives their mother to move the family to a new town in Grand River, Michigan. Yolonda adjusts well in school while Andrew ends up struggling. However, despite their academic differences, Yolonda is convinced that Andrew is a true musical genius. No one believes her claims though so she plans to prove all the naysayers wrong. So while they visit their Aunt Tiny back in Chicago, Yolonda sneaks Andrew onstage a Blues Concert where he finally shows his talent.

== Critical reception ==
Publishers Weekly says that this "heartwarming story merits acclaim for its fresh premise and forceful characterizations." Horn Book Magazine says that the novel is "suffused with humor and spirit".
