= Yolande Beckles =

British educationalist and businesswoman

Yolande Beckles (London, 1962—) is a British educationalist, businesswoman, and diversity consultant. She founded Global Graduates in 1998, a company aimed at raising the aspirations of, and teaching soft skills to mainly ethnic minority children. Additionally, Global Graduates worked closely with The Law Society to create the latter's Diversity in Law programme, which, according to the Society's CEO, Janet Paraskeva, improved "racial diversity in the profession". Global Graduates collapsed in 2003. After this, debts of over £125,000 were left unpaid and at least nineteen County Court judgments were lodged against Beckles.

Shortly after the 2003 insolvency of Global Graduates, Beckles set up Global Graduates Education, where her mother was appointed as a director. In 2004, Beckles, doing business as Global Graduates, offered guidance careers in law to minority students, and was sponsored by Allen & Overy, Freshfields, and Clifford Chance. By 2005, Global Graduates services to legal students included “writing CVs, filling out application forms and interview techniques, as well as arranging talks and open days at top firms,” and had served 600 students.

== BBC career ==
In 2006, she starred in a three-part documentary series called Don't Mess with Miss Beckles, filmed in Fortismere School, which was aired on BBC Two. In it, she tried to motivate three secondary school children (one per episode) to achieve more in their academic life. The reaction to the show in the media was polarised, with some praising her message of parental involvement in a child's learning, while others suggested that the show was exploitative and that her approach was misguided. A The Times critic questioned her qualifications; Paul Hoggart noted her academic interventions appeared to have worsened student outcomes. One of the parents featured in the show subsequently spoke out about Beckles's 'wholly inappropriate' behaviour. The president of the Association of Educational Psychologists said «The programme was dangerous and Beckles's behaviour completely inappropriate». The screening of the program also prompted a number of Beckles's creditors to issue renewed calls for payment. An individual claiming to be a friend of a creditor has since set up a website to monitor her activities.

== Move to the United States ==
Beckles currently lives in Los Angeles, where she has set up an educational program called Think Global Kids and is known as an educator. She was elected to a volunteer seat on the Greater Echo Park Elysian Neighborhood council. Think Global Kids has been suspended by the California Franchise Tax Board. In 2023, Beckles was president of the National Association of African American Parents and Youth, and collaborated in the creation of that year's California Department of Education mathematics framework that discouraged public schools from teaching algebra. In 2024, she was vice chairwoman of the Los Angeles Unified School District’s Parent Advisory Committee.

== Family life and education ==
She was born in London in 1962 to parents of Trinidadian origin. She has two siblings, Brian and Hermione, and two children, Diandra and Euan. Beckles left school at age 18; as of 2006, she had “no formal teaching qualifications."

== Published works ==
- Yolande Beckles; Rosa Rivera Furumoto; Araceli Simeón; Teneh Weller (2023). "Transforming Learning and Student Outcomes Requires Co-Construction With Families". In Reyna Hernandez; Margaret Caspe (eds.). Family and Community Partnerships Promising Practices for Teachers and Teacher Educators. Information Age Publishing Inc. pp. 127–134. ISBN 979-8-88730-300-0.
