= Jolanda =

Jolanda or Jolande is a feminine given name. It is a Dutch, Italian, German and Swiss German cognate of Yolanda.

Notable people named Jolanda or Jolande include:

== Jolanda ==
- Jolanda Annen (born 1992), Swiss triathlete
- Jolanda Benvenuti (1908–1981), Italian film editor
- Jolanda Čeplak (born 1976), Slovenian middle-distance athlete
- Jolanda De Palma (born 1931), Italian singer
- Jolanda Di Fiore (1935–2004), Italian actress known as Maria Fiore
- Jolanda van Dongen (born 1966), Dutch cyclist
- Jolanda Egger (born 1960), Swiss model
- Jolanda Elshof (born 1975), Dutch volleyball player
- Jolanda Insana (1937–2016), Italian poet
- Jolanda Jetten (born 1970), Dutch psychologist
- Jolanda Jones (born 1959), American heptathlete
- Jolanda Kallabis (born 2005), German middle-distance runner
- Jolanda Keizer (born 1985), Dutch heptathlete
- Jolanda Kindle (born 1965), Liechtenstein skier
- Jolanda Kodra (1910–1963), Albanian writer and translator,
- Jolanda Kroesen (born 1979), Dutch softball player
- Jolanda di Maria Petris (1916–1987), Italian-Finnish operatic soprano and voice pedagog
- Jolanda Meneguzzer (1929–2020), Italian lyric soprano
- Jolanda Mens (1978), Dutch former professional tennis player
- Jolanda Neff (born 1993), Swiss cyclist
- Jolanda Plank (born 1958), Italian skier
- Jolanda de Rover (born 1963), Dutch swimmer
- Jolanda Slenter (born 1965), Dutch sitting volleyball player
- Jolanda Spirig (born 1953), Swiss historian, writer, translator, and editor

== Jolande ==
- Jolande Jacobi (1890–1973), Swiss psychologist
- Jolande Jobin (1930–2010), Swiss figure skater
- Jolande van der Meer (born 1964), Dutch swimmer
- Jolande Sap (born 1963), Dutch GreenLeft politician

== See also ==
- Jolanda di Savoia, comune (municipality) in the province of Ferrara in the Italian region Emilia-Romagna
- Jolanta
