= Iolanta =

1892 opera by Pyotr Ilyich Tchaikovsky

- Opera by Tchaikovsky
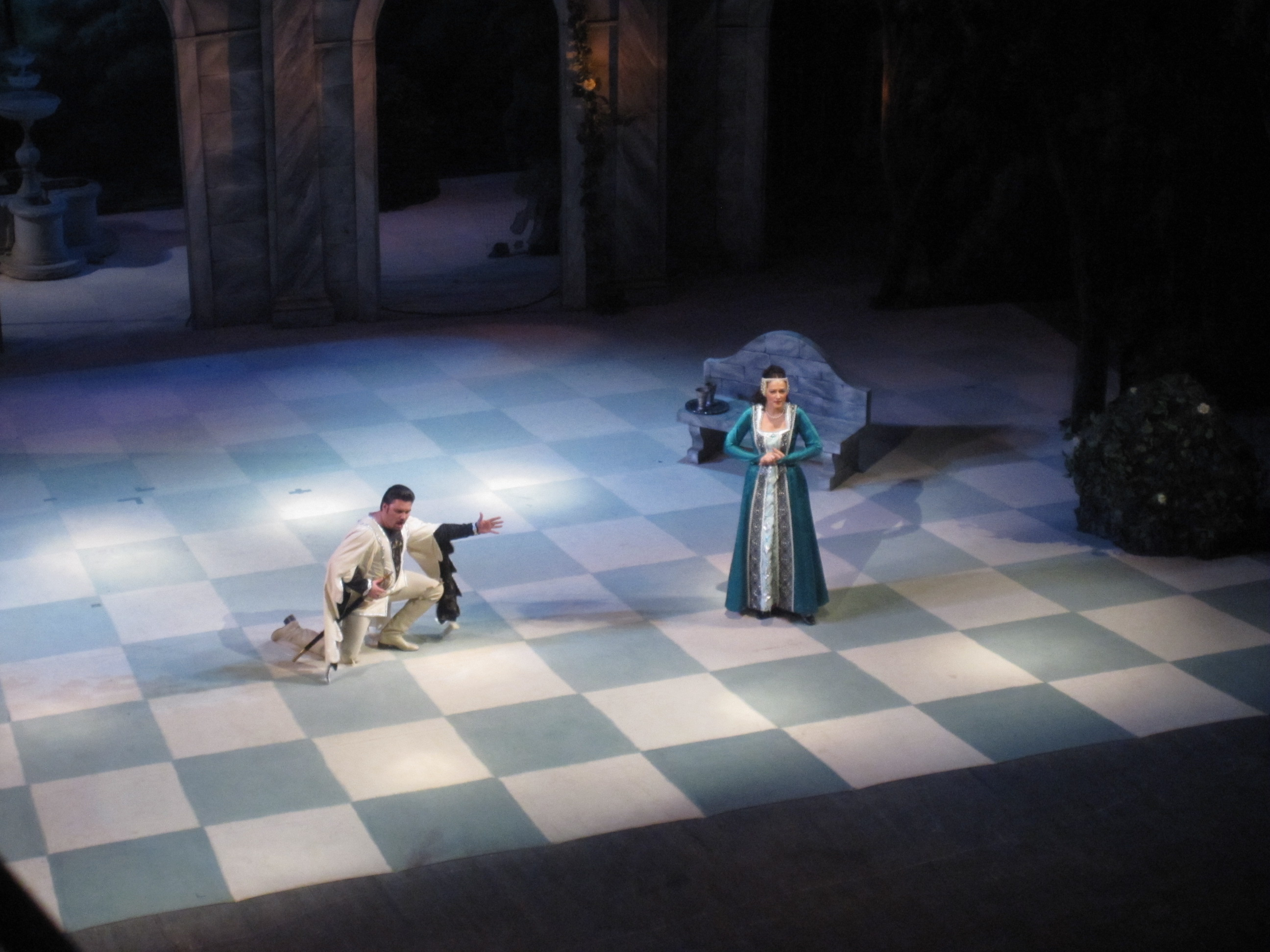
- Mikhailovsky Theatre, Saint Petersburg (2010)
- Native title: Russian: Иоланта
- Librettist: Modest Tchaikovsky
- Language: Russian
- Based on: Kong Renés Datter by Henrik Hertz
- Premiere: 18 December 1892; Mariinsky Theatre, Saint Petersburg

Iolanta, Op. 69, (Russian: Иоланта) is a lyric opera in one act by Pyotr Tchaikovsky. It was the last opera he composed. The libretto was written by the composer's brother Modest Tchaikovsky, and is based on the Danish play Kong Renés Datter (King René's Daughter) by Henrik Hertz, a romanticised account of the life of Yolande de Bar. In the original Danish play, the spelling of the princess's name was "Iolanthe", later adopted for the otherwise unrelated Gilbert and Sullivan operetta of that name. The play was translated by Fyodor Miller and adapted by Vladimir Zotov. The opera received its premiere on 18 December 1892 in Saint Petersburg.

== Composition history ==
Composing upon the completion of The Queen of Spades, Tchaikovsky worried that he had lost his creative inspiration after such a large project. He started Iolanta in June 1891 with the central duet, and, despite his worries, finished composition in September and orchestration in November. The public reception was quite favorable, though Tchaikovsky was disappointed and felt he was repeating himself, especially when compared to his earlier work, The Enchantress.

== Performance history ==
The world premiere took place on 18 December (6 December O.S.) 1892 at the Mariinsky Theatre in Saint Petersburg. It was conducted by Eduard Nápravník and sets were designed by Mikhail Bocharov. The premiere of the opera shared a double bill with the composer's last ballet, The Nutcracker. A 1997 two-act version of Iolanta is performed regularly at the Bolshoi Theatre in Moscow, and in Belarus.

Its first performance outside Russia was in Hamburg on 3 January 1893, with Gustav Mahler conducting. Mahler also conducted the Vienna premiere on 22 March 1900. In New York City it has been produced in 1997 and 2011 by Dicapo Opera. In 2015, Iolanta was performed for the first time at the Metropolitan Opera in New York City, with Anna Netrebko in the title role.

There are only a few recordings of the opera, although Robert's aria has been recorded and performed in concerts frequently. A 1963 performance was filmed in Riga and released overseas in 1974.

The blind singer Nafset Chenib (headliner of the 2014 Winter Paralympics closing ceremony) performed in the title role in the Ivangorod Fortress on 29 August 2021.

== Roles ==
Role	Voice type	Saint Petersburg premiere, 18 December 1892 (6 December O.S.) (Conductor: Eduard Nápravník)
René, King of Provence	bass	Konstantin Serebryakov
Robert, Duke of Burgundy	baritone	Leonid Yakovlev
Count Vaudémont, a Burgundian knight	tenor	Nikolay Figner
Ibn-Hakia, a Moorish physician	baritone	Arkady Chernov
Alméric, armor-bearer to King René	tenor	Vasily Karelin
Bertrand, doorkeeper of the castle	bass	Yalmar Frei
Iolanta, blind daughter of King René	soprano	Medea Mei-Figner
Marta, Bertrand's wife, Iolanta's nursemaid	contralto	Mariya Kamenskaya
Brigitta, Iolanta's friend	soprano	Aleksandra Runge
Laura, Iolanta's friend	mezzo-soprano	Mariya Dolina
Chorus, silent roles: Iolanta's servant-girls and friends, the king's retinue, the Burgundian Duke's regiment, men-at-arms

== Instrumentation ==
The instrumentation requires the following forces:

- Strings: violins I, violins II, violas, cellos, and double basses
- Woodwinds: 3 flutes (3rd doubling piccolo), 2 oboes, Cor Anglais, 2 clarinets (B-flat & A), 2 bassoons
- Brass: 4 horns (all in F), 2 trumpets (B-flat, A), 3 trombones, tuba
- Percussion: timpani
- Other: 2 harps

== Synopsis ==
Time: 15th century

Place: Mountains of southern France

=== Scene 1 ===
Princess Iolanta has been blind from birth. No one has ever told her (nor does she know) that she is a princess. She lives in a beautiful enclosed garden on the king's estate, secluded from the world, in the care of Bertrand and Martha. Her attendants bring flowers and sing to her. She declares her sadness, and her vague sense that she is missing something important that other people can experience. Her father, King René, insists that she must not discover she is blind, nor that her betrothed, Duke Robert, find out about this.

=== Scene 2 ===
After announcing the king's arrival, Alméric is warned by Bertrand not to speak of light with Iolanta or to reveal that Iolanta's father is the king. The king arrives with Ibn-Hakia, a famed Moorish physician, who states that Iolanta can be cured, but the physical cure will only work if she is psychologically prepared by being made aware of her own blindness. Ibn-Hakia sings the monologue "Two worlds", explaining the interdependence of the mind and the body within the divinely ordained universe, which merges spirit and matter. The king refuses the treatment, fearing for Iolanta's happiness if the cure should fail after she has learned what she is missing.

=== Scene 3 ===
Robert arrives at the court with his friend Count Vaudémont. Robert tells Vaudémont that he wishes to avoid the marriage as he has fallen in love with Countess Matilde. He sings of his love in his aria "Who can compare with my Mathilde" (Кто может сравниться с Матильдой моей). Vaudémont finds the entrance to Iolanta's secret garden, ignoring the sign which threatens death to anyone who enters. He sees the sleeping Iolanta without realising who she is, and instantly falls in love. Robert, astounded by his friend's behavior, is convinced she is a sorceress who has bewitched Vaudémont. He tells him to leave, but Vaudémont is too entranced. Robert departs to bring troops to rescue him. Iolanta awakens and Vaudémont, who asks her to give him a red rose as a keepsake, realizes she is blind when she twice offers him a white one. She has no concept of light, vision, or blindness. They fall in love, after he explains light and color to her.

=== Scene 4 ===
The couple is discovered by the king. Vaudémont pledges his love, whether Iolanta is blind or not. Ibn-Hakia tells the king that as Iolanta is now aware of her blindness, the treatment might be a success. Iolanta, who has no will to see, is unsure whether she should agree to the treatment or not. Ibn-Hakia points out that the lack of will proves that, without inner desire, change cannot take place.

After Vaudémont admits seeing the warning sign at the garden entrance, the furious king threatens to execute him for revealing the truth to Iolanta. He tells Iolanta that Vaudémont will die if the physician fails to restore her sight, in the hope that this will restore her will. Iolanta is horrified, and agrees to the treatment. After Ibn-Hakia leaves with Iolanta, the king explains to Vaudémont that he was feigning in order to motivate Iolanta. Robert returns with his troops. He admits to the king he has fallen in love with another, but is still willing to go ahead with the agreed marriage. The king cancels the wedding contract, and gives Iolanta to Vaudémont. Ibn-Hakia and Iolanta return. The treatment has worked and Iolanta can see. At first uncertain of her new gift, she eventually sings of the magical new world now visible to her. The court rejoices.

== Principal arias and numbers ==
- Scene 1a. Iolanta's Arioso (Ариозо Иоланты): "Why haven't I known this before?" "Отчего это прежде не знала – Otchevo eto prezhde ne znala"
- Scene 5b. Ibn-Hakia's Monologue (Монолог Эбн-Хакиа): "Two worlds" "Два мира (Dva mira)"
- Aria: "Who can be compared with my Matilda?" "Кто может сравниться с Матильдой моей – Kto mozhet sravnit'sa s Matil'doy moyey" (Robert)

== Structure ==
Introduction
No. 1: Scena (Marta) "Мой птенчик, Иоланта, ты устала? – Moy ptenchik, Iolanta, ty ustala?"
No. 1a: Iolanta's Arioso "Отчего это прежде не знала – Otchego eto prezhde ne znala"
No. 2a: Scena (Marta) "Полно, не надо, родная, попусту душу томить! – Polno, ne nado, rodnaya, popustu dushu tomit'!"
No. 2b: Chorus (Brigitta, Laura, Maidservants) "Вот тебе лютики, вот васильки – Vot tebe lyutiki, vot vasil'ki"
No. 3a: Scena (Iolanta) "Бригитта, это ты? – Brigitta, eto ty?"
No. 3b: Chorus (Brigitta, Laura, Marta) "Спи, пусть ангелы крылами навевают сны – Spi, pust' angely krylami navevayut sny"
No. 4a: Scena (Bertrand) "Призывный рог! – Prizyvnyy rog!"
No. 4b: King René's Aria "Господь мой, если грешен я – Gospod' moy, yesli greshen ya"
No. 5a: Scena (King René) "Твое лицо бесстрастно – Tvoye litso besstrastno"
No. 5b: Ibn-Hakia's Monologue "Два мира: плотский и духовный – Dva mira: plotskiy i dukhovnyy"
No. 6a: Scena (Robert) "Не торопись – Ne toropis'"
No. 6b: Robert's Aria "Кто может сравниться с Матильдой моей – Kto mozhet sravnit'sya s Matil'doy moyey"
No. 6c: Vaudemont's Romance "Нет! Чары ласк красы мятежной – Net! Chary lask krasy myatezhnoy"
No. 7a: Scena (Vaudemont) "Однако где же мы? – Odnako gde zhe my?"
No. 7b: Duet (Vaudemont, Iolanta) "Вы мне предстали как виденье – Vy mne predstali kak viden'ye"
No. 8: Scena (Marta, Laura, Brigitta, Maidservants) "Иоланта! – Iolanta!"
No. 9: Finale (King René) "Прости меня, я обманул тебя – Prosti menya, ya obmanul tebya"

== Recordings ==
Audio

- 1940, Glafira Zhukovskaya (Iolanta), Boris Bugaisky (René), Panteleimon Nortsov (Robert, Duke of Burgundy), Grigory Bolshakov (Vaudémont), Alexander Baturin (Ebn-Hakia), Alexander Khosson (Alméric), Mikhail Solovyev (Bertran), Maria Levina (Marta), Kapitolina Ratchevskaya (Brigitta), Basya Aiborskaya (Laura). Bolshoi Theatre Soloists and Chorus and Orchestra, Samuil Samosud. Aquarius.
- 1977, Tamara Sorokina (Iolanta), Yevgeny Nesterenko (René), Yuri Mazurok (Robert, Duke of Burgundy), Vladimir Atlantov (Vaudémont), Vladimir Valaitis (Ibn-Hakia), Alexander Arkhipov (Alméric), Valery Yaroslavtsev (Bertrand), Nina Grigorieva (Martha), Klara Kadinskaya (Brigitta), Larisa Nikitina (Laura). Bolshoi Theatre Soloists & Chorus and Orchestra, Mark Ermler. Melodiya.
- 1984, Galina Vishnevskaya (Iolanta), Dimiter Petkov (René), Walton Gronroos (Robert, Duke of Burgundy), Nicolai Gedda (Vaudémont), Tom Krause (Ibn-Hakia), James Anderson (Alméric), Fernand Dumont (Bertrand), Viorica Cortez (Martha), Tania Gedda (Brigitta), Colleen Gaetano (Laura). Groupe Vocal de France & Orchestre de Paris, Mstislav Rostropovich. Erato.
- 1994, Galina Gorchakova (Iolanta), Sergei Alexashkin (René), Dmitri Hvorostovsky (Robert, Duke of Burgundy), Gegham Grigoryan (Vaudémont), Nikolai Putilin (Ibn-Hakia), Nikolai Gassiev (Alméric), Gennady Bezzubenkov (Bertrand), Larissa Diadkova (Martha), Tatiana Kravtsova (Brigitta), Olga Korzhenskaya (Laura). Kirov Theatre, Valery Gergiev. Philips.
- 1996, Tatiana Vorjdova (Iolanta), Alexei Levitski (René), Vassili Gorshkov (Vaudémont), Vladimir Prudnik (Ibn-Hakia), Sergei Nikitin (Robert), Tatiana Gorbunova (Martha) Novosibirsk State Opera Orchestra, Alexei Ludmilin. Brilliant Classics.
- 2002, Olga Mykytenko (Iolanta), Benno Schollum (René), Piotr Beczała (Vaudémont), Vladimir Krassov (Ibn-Hakia), Andrey Grigoryev (Robert), Roman Muravitsky (Almeric), Nikolai Didenko (Bertrand), Nina Romanova (Martha), Bella Kabanova (Brigitte) The Moscow Chamber Choir, Tchaikovsky Symphony Orchestra of Moscow Radio, Vladimir Fedoseyev. RELIEF.
- 2015, Anna Netrebko (Iolanta), Vitalij Kowaljow (René), Sergey Skorokhodov (Vaudémont), Lucas Meachem (Ibn-Hakia), Alexey Markov (Robert), Junho You (Almeric), Luka Debevec Mayer (Bertrand), Monika Bohinec (Martha), Theresa Plut (Brigitte), Slovenian Chamber Choir, Slovenian Philharmonic Orchestra, Emmanuel Villaume. Deutsche Grammophon.
- 2015, Olesya Golovneva (Iolanta), Alexander Vinogradov (René), Dmitri Popov (Vaudémont), Andrei Bondarenko (Robert). Conductor Dmitri Kitayenko, Cologne Opera Chorus, Gürzenich Orchestra Cologne. Oehms.

Video

- 1963, Galina Oleinichenko, Ivan Petrov, Pavel Lisitsian, Zurab Andzaparidze Bolshoi. Boris Khaykin
- 1982, Galina Kalinina, Artur Eisen. VAI.
- 2009, Anna Netrebko (Iolanta), Sergey Skorokhodov (Vaudémont), Sergei Aleksashkin (René, King of Provence), Alexei Markov (Robert, Duke of Burgundy). Mariinsky Theatre, Saint Petersburg. Director, Mariusz Treliński, Conductor, Valery Gergiev
- 2012, Ekaterina Scherbachenko, Pavel Cernoch. Teatro Real de Madrid. Teodor Currentzis
- 2018, Queen City Opera, Cincinnati, Ohio; with English subtitles
