= Yolanda Young (journalist) =

American journalist (born 1968)

- Born: October 31, 1968 (age 57)
- Education: Howard University; Georgetown University Law Center

Yolanda Young (born October 31, 1968) is an American journalist, author, and lecturer. Her work as a writer focuses on law, politics, and culture. Young has addressed audiences at Harvard Law School and the University of Arizona. She was the keynote speaker for the 2011 National Black Pre-Law Conference.

She is on the board of the PEN/Faulkner Foundation.

== Writing career ==
Young's first book, On Our Way To Beautiful (Random House 2002) received favorable reviews from publications like The Chicago Tribune. Young has also been included in the following anthologies: This I Believe II: More Personal Philosophies of Remarkable Men and Women; Shaking the Tree: A Collection of New Fiction; and Memoir by Black Women; and The Black Body.

Young's upcoming book, "Thurgood's Legacy: Black Lawyers Reflect on Law School, the Legal Profession, and Life," is based on a series of articles written for On Being A Black Lawyer.

== Journalism career ==
Young contributes columns to USA TODAY. She also provides commentary for NPR, The Washington Post and other publications. Noteworthy pieces include "Bakke ruling exposes generational divide," Stay Away From Your Man, Rihanna! Mapp v. Ohio Turns 50: A Look at Warren Court's Rights of Defendants, and It's Shreveport's Season.

== On Being A Black Lawyer ==
Young founded On Being A Black Lawyer (OBABL) in 2008 as a news and resource center for African American attorneys. OBABL has been recognized by the American Bar Association. In addition to its legal news blog, OBABL releases the following publications annually: The Power 100, which recognizes the most powerful black attorneys in the nation; The Salute to the Congressional Black Caucus & the Nation's Top Lawyers Black Lawyers With Influence; and The Black Student's Guide to Law Schools, which includes rankings of the top law schools for black students.

== Controversy ==
In 2008 Young wrote an exposé in The Huffington Post "Law Firm Segregation Reminiscent of Jim Crow."

"[Law firm] Staff attorneys are non-partner track lawyers who handle the menial legal tasks--generating binders and attaching "relevant" or "not relevant" codes to thousands of emails, spreadsheets, and any other documents associated with a particular case—that associates shun. While paralegals have their own offices, as many as ten staff attorneys share windowless file rooms. Segregated from other lawyers in the firm, we go uninvited to attorney-only firm functions and are not provided jury duty or maternity leave. The base pay and bonus structure is half that of a 25 year old first year associate's."

Young would go on to file a lawsuit against the firm alleging discrimination and retaliation; however, a federal judge dismissed the case on summary judgement.

== Personal life ==
Young was raised in Shreveport, Louisiana. In her memoir, On Our Way To Beautiful, Young recounts how she and her family overcame many tragedies. According to Washingtonian Magazine, "The stories tell of a sometimes-troubled family--Young's father shot and wounded her mother, and an uncle is in prison--but a mostly loving one, thanks to the values imparted by Young's grandmother and great-grandmother."

== Education ==
Young attended Howard University majoring in Accounting with a minor in Political Science. She is also a graduate of the Georgetown University Law Center.
