= Louis of Anjou =

Louis of Anjou may refer to:

- Louis of Toulouse, (1274–1297), cadet of the royal French house of Anjou and Catholic bishop
- Louis I of Naples (1320–1362), husband of Joanna I, of the Capetian House of Anjou
- Louis I of Hungary (1326–1382), King of Hungary, Croatia, Dalmatia, Jerusalem, Sicily and Poland, of the Capetian House of Anjou
- Louis I, Duke of Anjou (1339–1384), of the House of Valois-Anjou, titular King of Naples
- Louis II of Naples (1377–1417), rival of Ladislas as King of Naples
- Louis III of Anjou (1403–1434), Duke of Anjou, titular King of Naples
- Louis of Anjou, Marquis of Pont-à-Mousson (1427–1443)
