= René of Anjou =

King of Naples (1435–1442) and Duke of Anjou (1434–1480)

René I
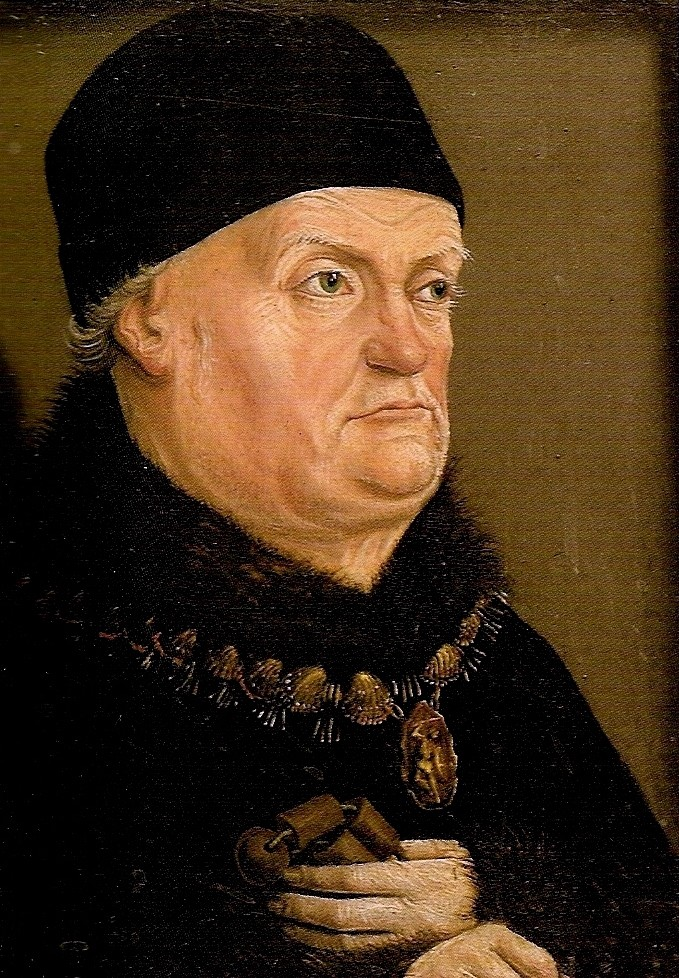
- 1474 portrait by Nicolas Froment

King of Naples
- Reign: 2 February 1435 – 2 June 1442
- Predecessor: Joanna II
- Successor: Alfonso I

Duke of Anjou Count of Provence
- Reign: 12 November 1434 – 10 July 1480
- Predecessor: Louis III
- Successor: Charles IV

Duke of Lorraine
- Reign: 25 January 1431 – 28 February 1453
- Predecessor: Charles II
- Successor: John II
- Co-ruler: Isabella
- Born: René of Anjou; 16 January 1409; Château d'Angers, Angers, Anjou, France
- Died: 10 July 1480 (aged 71); Aix-en-Provence, Provence, France
- Burial: Angers Cathedral, Angers
- Spouses: Isabella, Duchess of Lorraine (m. 1419; died 1453) Jeanne de Laval (m. 1454)
- Issue more...: John II, Duke of Lorraine; Louis, Marquis of Pont-à-Mousson; Yolande, Duchess of Lorraine; Margaret, Queen of England
- House: Valois-Anjou
- Father: Louis II of Naples
- Mother: Yolande of Aragon

René I of Anjou (Italian: Renato; Occitan: Rainièr; 16 January 1409 – 10 July 1480) was Duke of Anjou and Count of Provence from 1434 to 1480, who also reigned as King of Naples from 1435 to 1442 (then deposed). Having spent his last years in Aix-en-Provence, he is known in France as the Good King René (Occitan: Rei Rainièr lo Bòn; French: Le bon roi René).

René was a member of the House of Valois-Anjou, a cadet branch of the French royal house, and the great-grandson of John II of France. He was a prince of the blood, and for most of his adult life also the brother-in-law of the reigning king Charles VII of France. Other than the aforementioned titles, he was also Duke of Bar from the 1420s onwards and Duke of Lorraine from 1431 to 1453.

== Biography ==
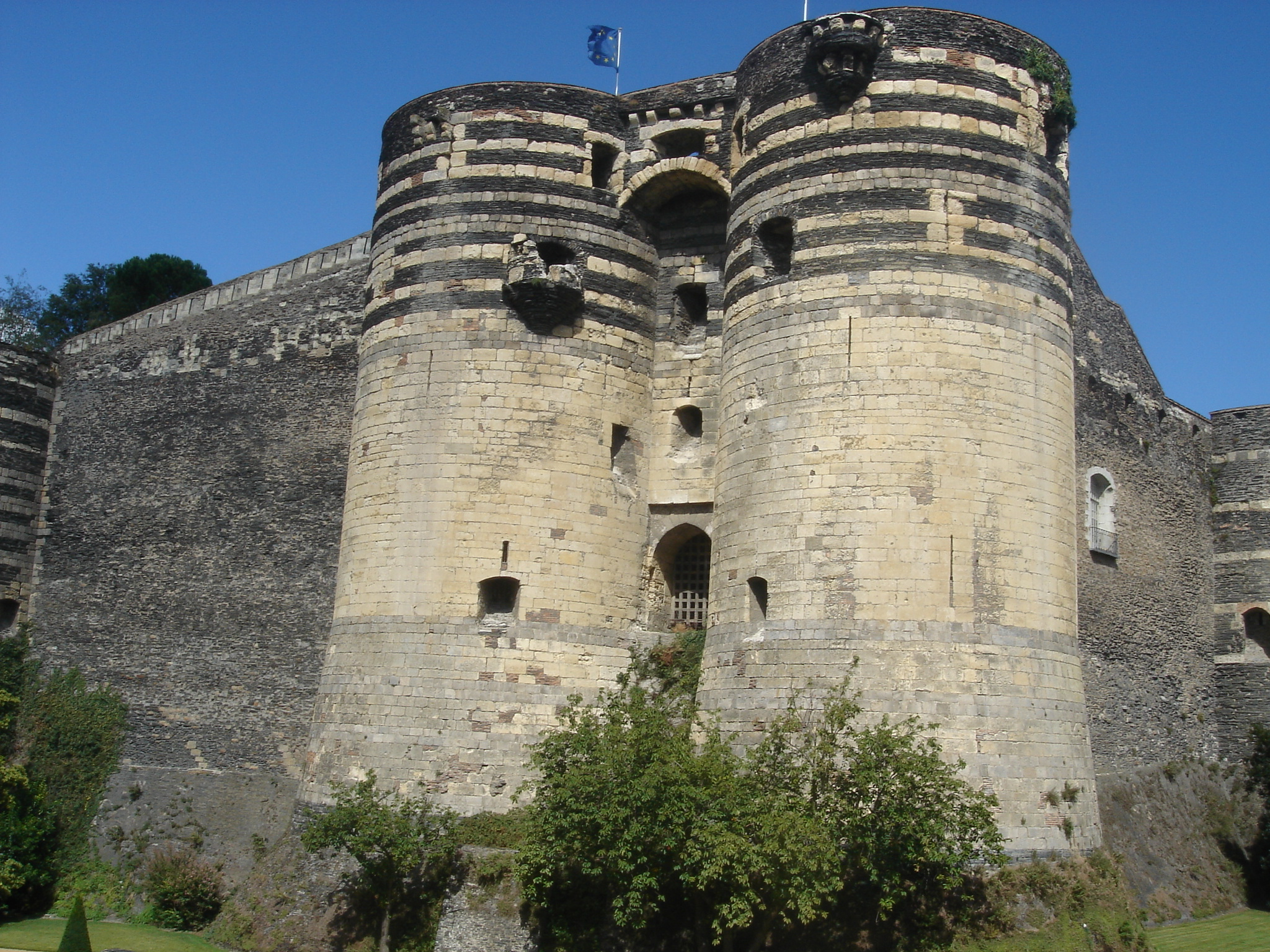
The Castle of Angers, René's birthplace.

René was born on 16 January 1409 in the castle of Angers. He was the second son of Duke Louis II of Anjou, King of Naples, by Yolanda of Aragon. René was the brother of Marie of Anjou, who married the future Charles VII and became Queen of France.

Louis II died in 1417 and his sons, together with their brother-in-law Charles, were brought up under the guardianship of their mother. The elder son, Louis III, succeeded to the crown of Sicily and the Duchy of Anjou; René then became Count of Guise. In 1419, when René was only ten, he was legally married to Isabella, elder daughter of Charles II, Duke of Lorraine.

René was to be brought up in Lorraine under the guardianship of Charles II and Louis, cardinal of Bar, both of whom were attached to the Burgundian party, but he retained the right to bear the arms of Anjou. He was far from sympathizing with the Burgundians. Joining the French army at Reims in 1429, he was present at the consecration of Charles VII. When Louis of Bar died in 1430, René inherited the duchy of Bar. The next year, on his father-in-law's death, he succeeded to the duchy of Lorraine. The inheritance was contested by the heir-male, Antoine de Vaudemont, who with Burgundian help defeated René at Bulgneville in July 1431. The Duchess Isabella effected a truce with Antoine, but the duke remained a prisoner of the Burgundians until April 1432, when he recovered his liberty on parole on yielding up as hostages his two sons, John and Louis.

René's title as duke of Lorraine was confirmed by his suzerain, Holy Roman Emperor Sigismund, at Basel in 1434. This proceeding roused the anger of the Burgundian duke, Philip the Good, who required him early in the next year to return to his prison, from which he was released two years later on payment of a heavy ransom. At the death of his brother Louis III in 1435, he succeeded to the Duchy of Anjou and County of Maine. The marriage of Marie of Bourbon, niece of Philip of Burgundy, with John, Duke of Calabria, René's eldest son, cemented peace between the two families.

Joanna II, queen of Naples, had chosen Louis III as her presumptive heir and upon Louis' death offered it to René to inherit her kingdom after her death. After appointing a regency in Bar and Lorraine, he set sail for Naples in 1438.

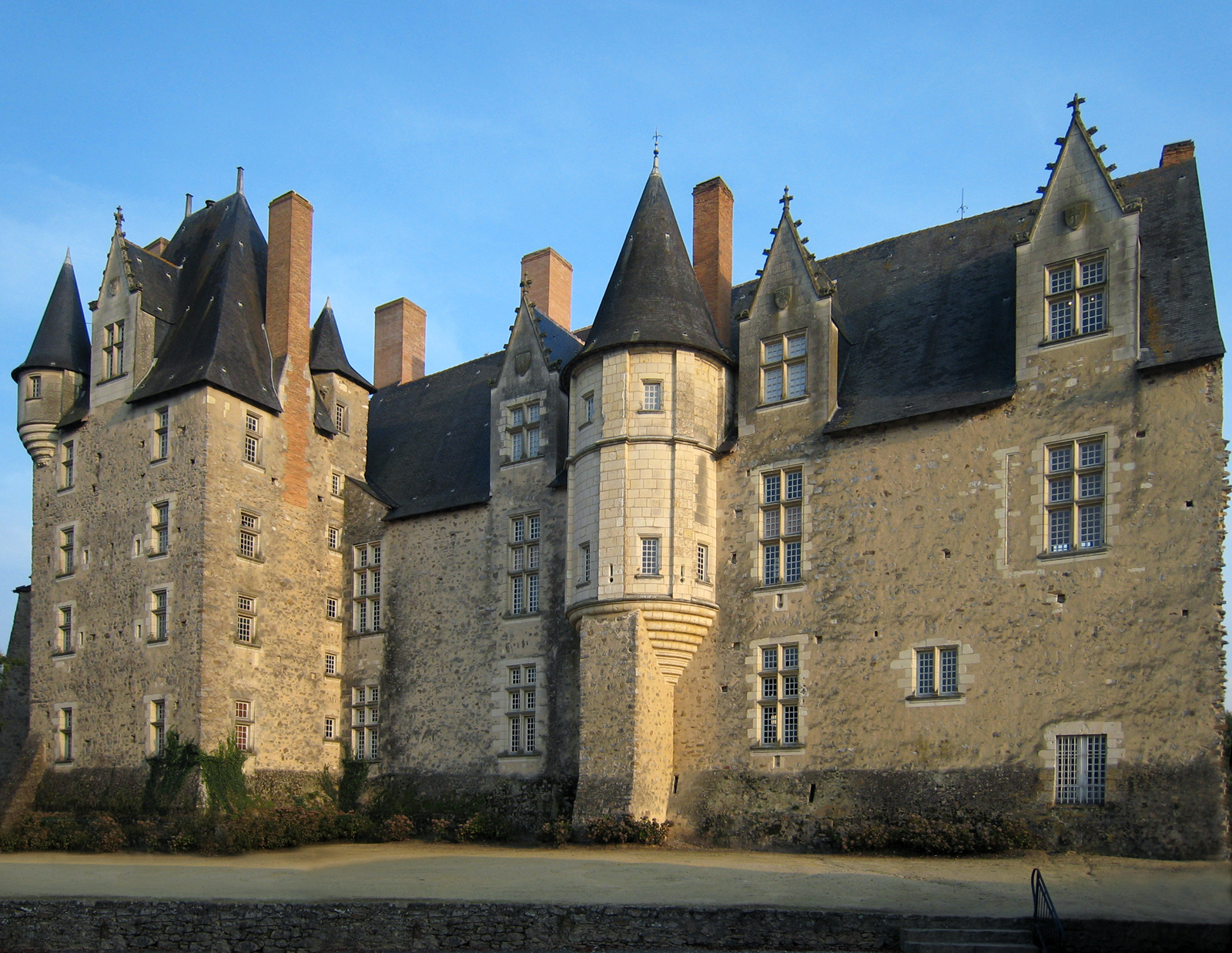
The castle of Baugé, home castle of René, Duke of Anjou, in the village of Baugé, Maine-et-Loire, France.

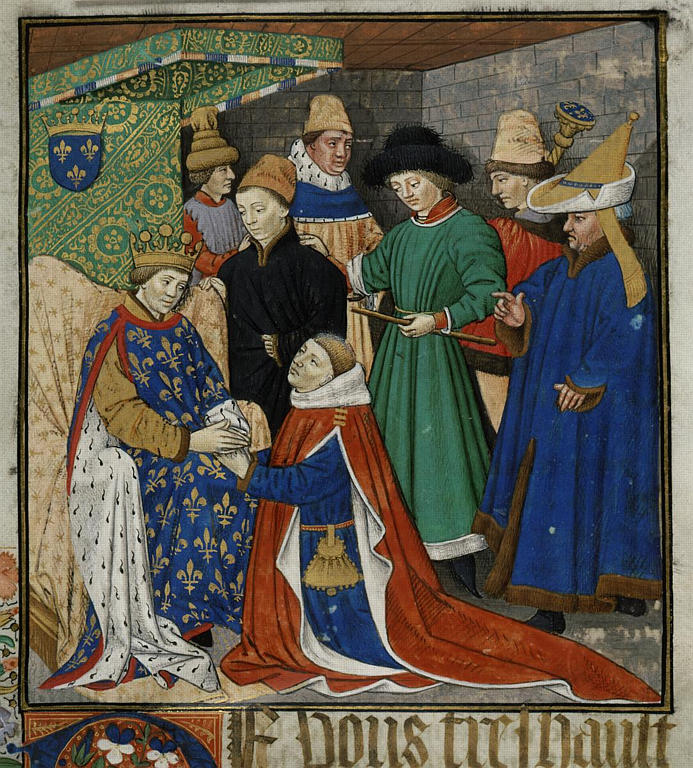
René, as a vassal, paying homage to the King of France.

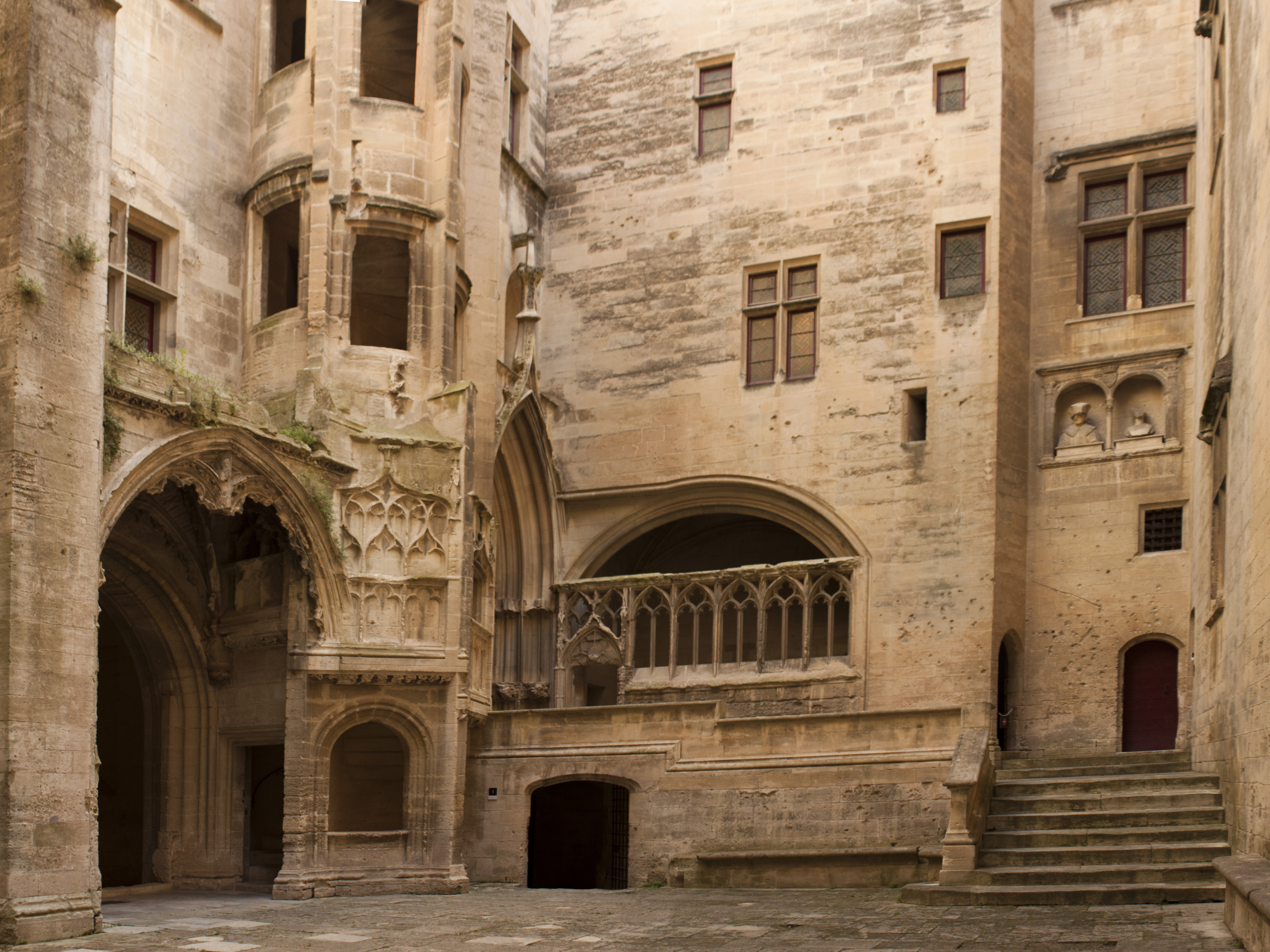
The court of honour in the chateau at Tarascon, Provence, with vestiges of the busts of René and Jeanne de Laval on the right

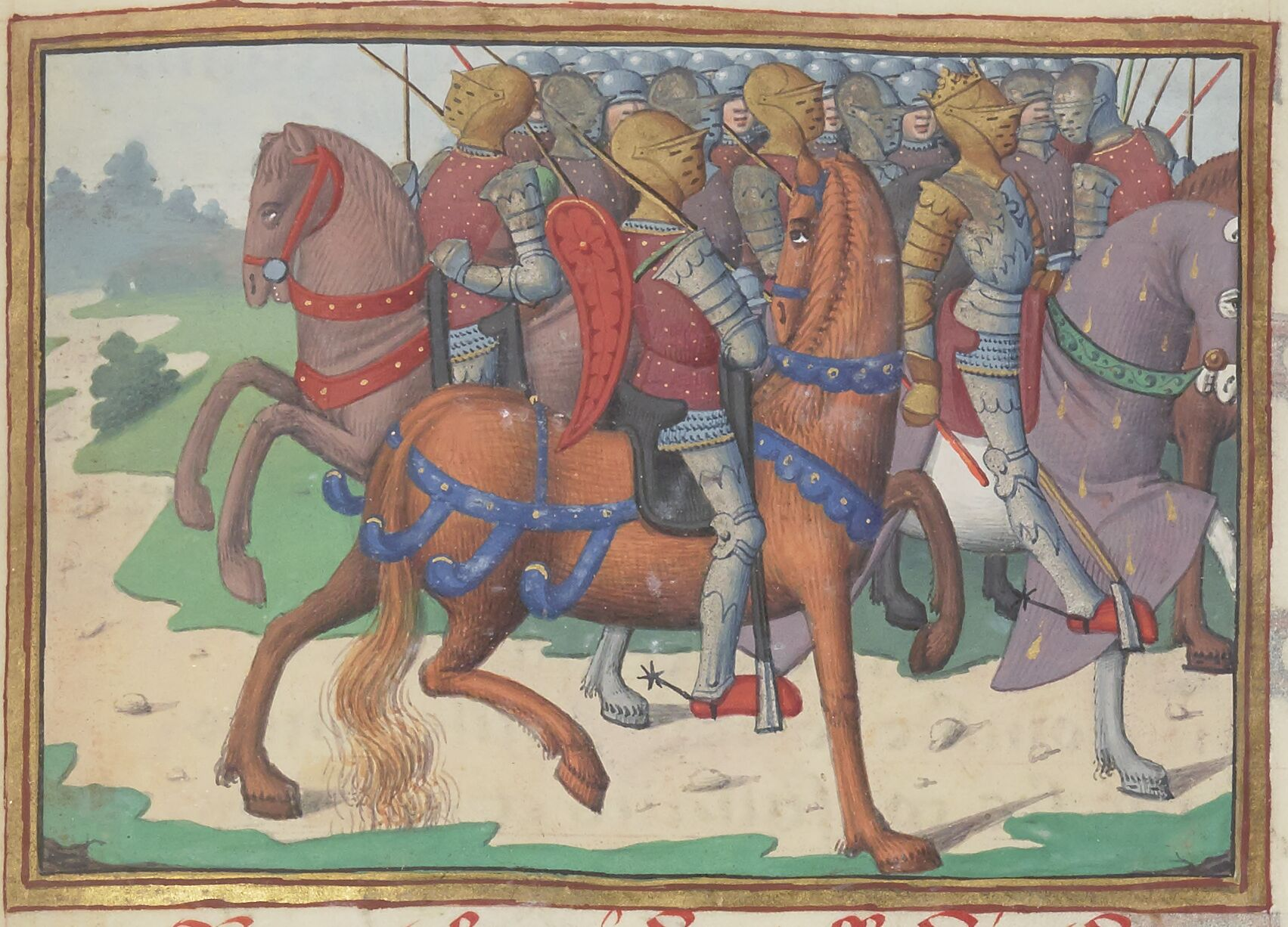
René of Naples with his army.

Naples, however, was also claimed by Alfonso V of Aragon, who had been first adopted and then repudiated by Joanna II. In 1441 Alfonso laid a six-month siege to Naples. René returned to France in 1442, and though he retained the title of king of Naples his effective rule was never recovered. Later efforts to recover his rights in Italy failed. His mother Yolande, who had governed Anjou in his absence, died in 1442.

René took part in the negotiations with the English at Tours in 1444, and peace was consolidated by the marriage of his younger daughter, Margaret, with Henry VI of England at Nancy.

René now made over the government of Lorraine to his son John, who was, however, only formally installed as Duke of Lorraine on the death of René's wife Isabella in 1453. René had the confidence of Charles VII, and is said to have initiated the reduction of the men-at-arms set on foot by the king, with whose military operations against the English he was closely associated. He entered Rouen with him in November 1449.

After his second marriage with Jeanne de Laval, daughter of Guy of Laval and Isabella of Brittany, René took a less active part in public affairs, devoting himself to composing poetry and painting miniatures, gardening and raising animals. The fortunes of his house declined in his old age: in 1466, the rebellious Catalans offered the crown of Aragon to René. His son John, unsuccessful in Italy, was sent to take up the conquest of that kingdom but died—apparently by poison—at Barcelona on 16 December 1470. John's eldest son Nicholas perished in 1473, also under suspicion of poisoning. In 1471, René's daughter Margaret was finally defeated in the Wars of the Roses. Her husband and her son were killed and she herself became a prisoner who had to be ransomed by Louis XI in 1476.

René retired to Aix-en-Provence and in 1474 made a will by which he left Bar to his grandson René II, Duke of Lorraine; and Anjou and Provence to his nephew Charles, count of Le Maine. King Louis XI seized Anjou and Bar, and two years later sought to compel René to exchange the two duchies for a pension. The offer was rejected, but further negotiations assured the lapse to the crown of the duchy of Anjou and the annexation of Provence was only postponed until the death of the Count of Le Maine. René died on 10 July 1480 at Aix, but was buried in the Angers Cathedral, Angers. In the 19th century, historians bestowed on him the epithet "the good".

He founded an order of chivalry, the Ordre du Croissant, which preceded the royal foundation of St Michael but did not survive René.

== Arts ==
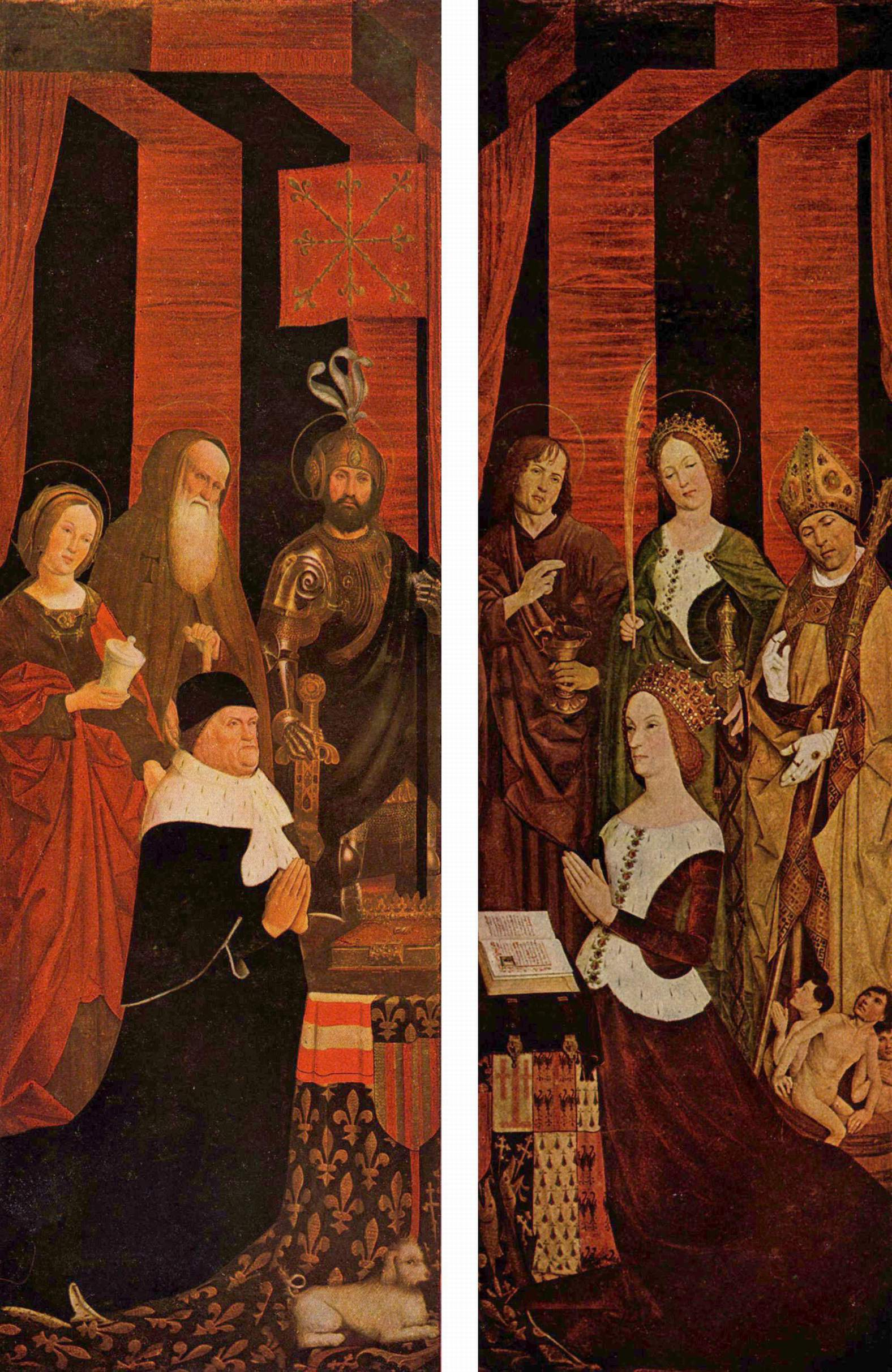
Side panels of the Burning Bush triptych, showing René and his second wife, Jeanne de Laval.

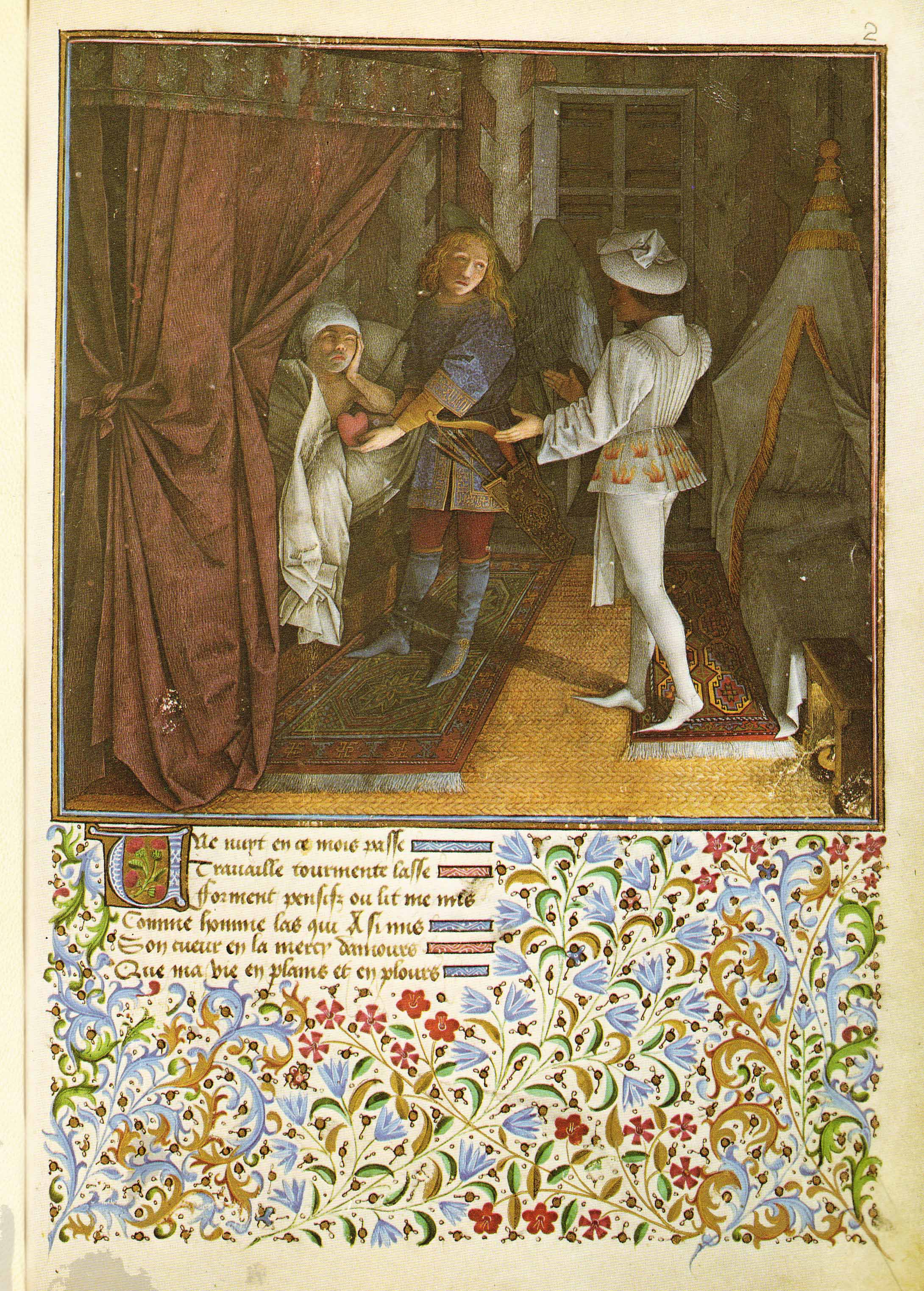
Miniature by or after Barthélemy d'Eyck from Le Livre du cœur d'Amour épris depicting Love giving Desire to the heart of the ailing king

René's fame as an amateur painter (Note: A letter from the Neapolitan humanist Pietro Summonte to Marcantonio Michiel, of 20 March 1524, reporting on the state of art in Naples, and works there by Netherlandish painters, states that "King René was also a skilled painter and was very keen on the study of the discipline, but according to the style of Flanders". The letter was published by Niccolini in 1925 and translated by Richardson & al. in 2007.) formerly led to the optimistic attribution to him of many paintings in Anjou and Provence, in many cases simply because they bore his arms. These works are generally in the Early Netherlandish style, and were probably executed under his patronage and direction, so that he may be said to have formed a school of the fine arts in sculpture, painting, goldsmith's work and tapestry. He employed Barthélemy d'Eyck as both painter and varlet de chambre for most of his career.

Two of the most famous works formerly attributed to René are the triptych of the Burning Bush of Nicolas Froment of Avignon in Aix Cathedral, showing portraits of René and his second wife, Jeanne de Laval, and two illuminated Book of Hours in the Bibliothèque nationale de France and the British Library. Among the men of letters attached to his court was Antoine de la Sale, whom he made tutor to his son John. He encouraged the performance of mystery plays; on the performance of a mystery of the Passion at Saumur in 1462 he remitted four years of taxes to the town, and the representations of the Passion at Angers were carried out under his auspices.

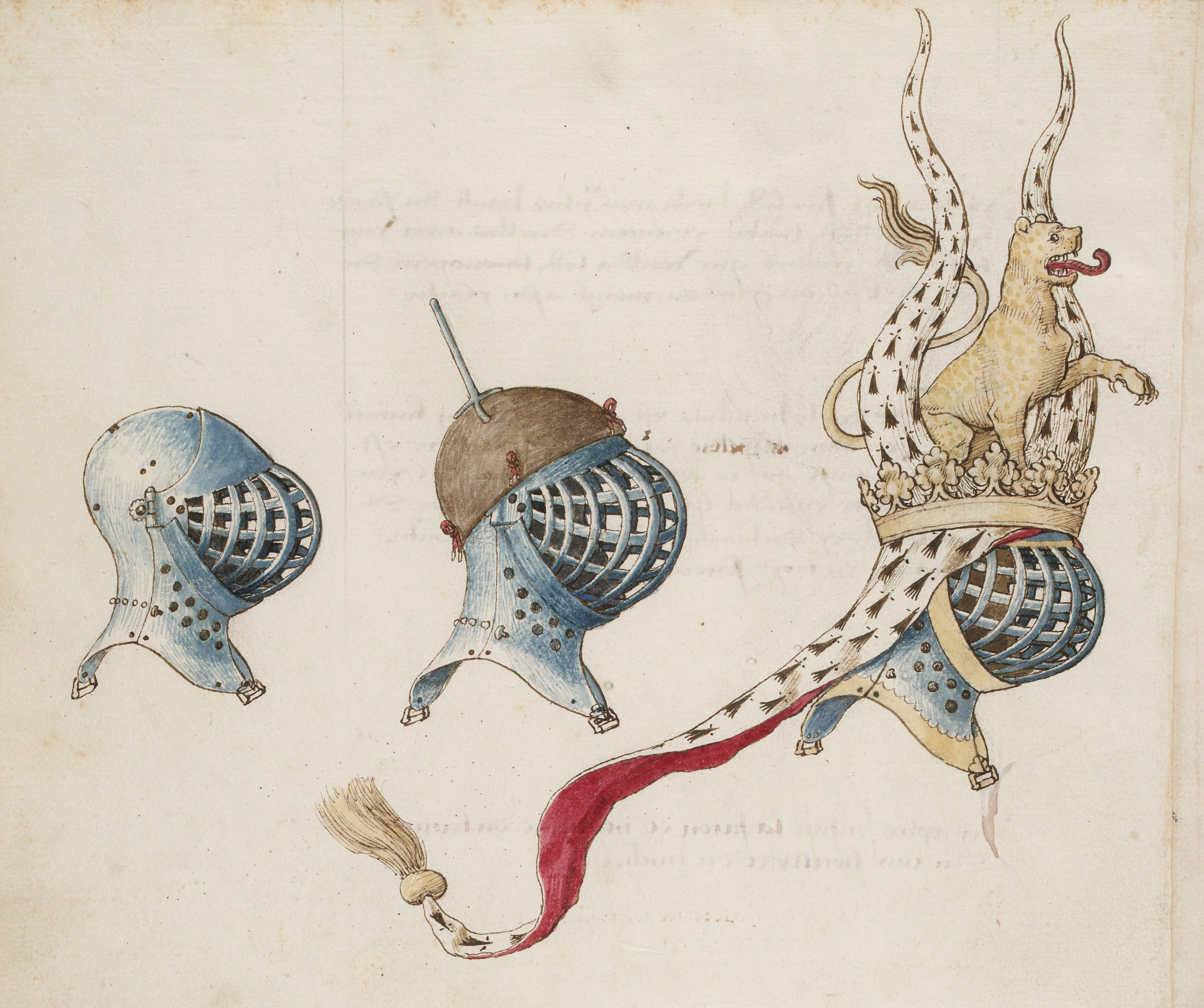
Watercolour, probably by Barthélemy d'Eyck, from King René's Tournament Book.

He exchanged verses with his kinsman, the poet Charles of Orléans. René was also the author of two allegorical works: a devotional dialogue, Le Mortifiement de vaine plaisance (The Mortification of Vain Pleasure, 1455), and a love quest, Le Livre du Cuer d'amours espris (The Book of the Love-Smitten Heart, 1457). The latter fuses the conventions of Arthurian romance with an allegory of love based on the Romance of the Rose. Both works were exquisitely illustrated by his court painter, Barthélémy d'Eyck. Le Mortifiement survives in eight illuminated manuscripts. Although Barthélémy's original is lost, the extant manuscripts include copies of his miniatures by Jean le Tavernier, Jean Colombe, and others. René is sometimes credited with the pastoral poem "Regnault and Jeanneton", (Note: As, for instance, by the 11th edition of the Encyclopædia Britannica.) but this was more likely a gift to the king honoring his marriage to Jeanne de Laval.

King René's Tournament Book (Le Livre des tournois or Traicte de la Forme de Devis d'un Tournoi; c. 1460) describes rules of a tournament. The most famous and earliest of the many manuscript copies is kept in the French National Library. This is—unusually for a deluxe manuscript—on paper and painted in watercolor. It may represent drawings by Barthélemy d'Eyck, intended as preparatory only, which were later illuminated by him or another artist. There are twenty-six full and double page miniatures. The description given in the book is different from that of the pas d'armes held at Razilly and Saumur; conspicuously absent are the allegorical and chivalresque ornamentations that were in vogue at the time. René instead emphasizes he is reporting on ancient tournament customs of France, Germany and the Low Countries, combining them in a new suggestion on how to hold a tournament. The tournament described is a melee fought by two sides. Individual jousts are only briefly mentioned.

As a patron, René commissioned translations and retranslations of classical works into French prose. These include Strabo, which Guarino da Verona completed in 1458; and Ovid's Metamorphoses by an unknown translator, completed in 1467.

Rene also kept a theater troupe at his court, led by a jester and playwright Triboulet. The duke rewarded Triboulet generously for his talents.

== Marriages and issue ==
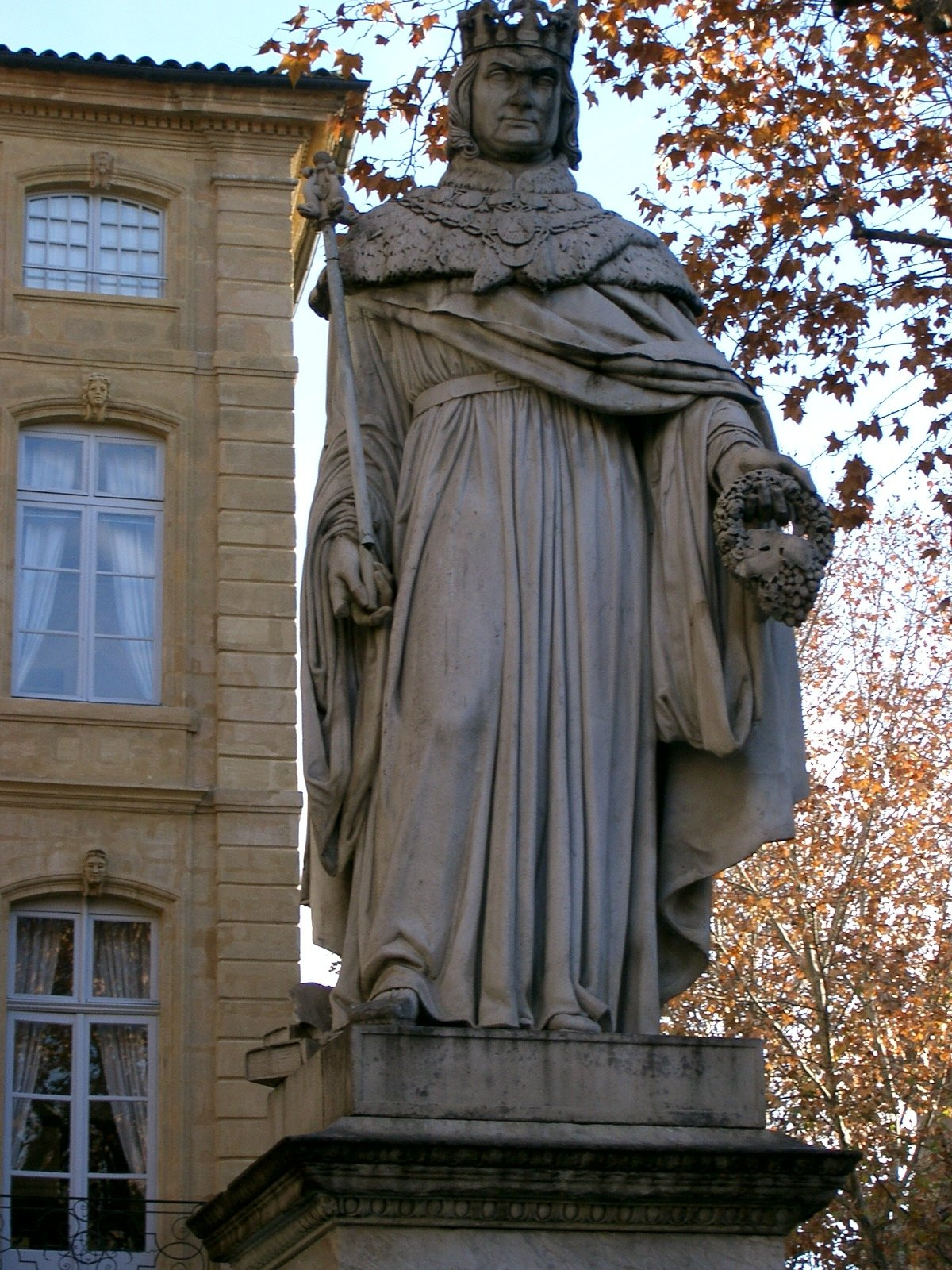
Statue in Aix-en-Provence of King René holding the Muscat grapes he brought to Provence

René married:

1. Isabelle, Duchess of Lorraine (1400 – 28 February 1453) on 24 October 1420.
2. Jeanne de Laval, on 10 September 1454, at the Abbey of St. Nicholas in Angers

His legitimate children by Isabelle were:

1. John II (2 August 1424 – 16 December 1470), Duke of Lorraine and King of Naples, married Marie de Bourbon, daughter of Charles I, Duke of Bourbon, by whom he had issue. He also had several illegitimate children.
2. Louis (16 October 1427 – between 22 May and 16 October 1444), Marquis of Pont-à-Mousson and Lieutenant General of Lorraine. At the age of five, in 1432, he was sent as a hostage to Dijon with his brother John in exchange for their captive father. John was released, but Louis was not and died of pneumonia in prison.
3. Nicholas, (2 November 1428 – 1430), twin with Yolande, Duke of Bar.
4. Yolande (2 November 1428 – 23 March 1483), married Frederick II, Count of Vaudemont; mother, among others, of Duke René II of Lorraine.
5. Margaret (23 March 1430 – 25 August 1482), married King Henry VI of England, by whom she had a son, Edward of Westminster, Prince of Wales.
6. Charles (1431 – 1432), Count of Guise.
7. Isabelle (died young).
8. René (died young).
9. Louise (1436 – 1438).
10. Anna (1437 – 1450, buried in Gardanne).

He also had three illegitimate children:

1. John, Bastard of Anjou (d. 1536), Marquis of Pont-à-Mousson, married 1500 Marguerite de Glandeves-Faucon.
2. Jeanne Blanche (d. 1470), Lady of Mirebeau, married in Paris 1467 Bertrand de Beauvau (d. 1474).
3. Madeleine (d. aft. 1515), Countess of Montferrand, married in Tours 1496 Louis Jean, seigneur de Bellenave.

== Cultural references ==
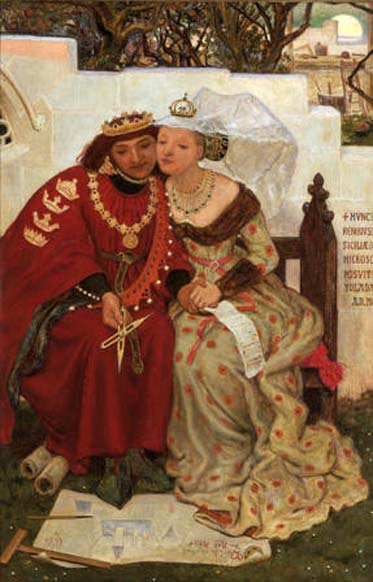
King René's Honeymoon, 1864, an imaginary scene in the life of the king by Ford Madox Brown.

He appears as "Reignier" in William Shakespeare's play Henry VI, part 1. His alleged poverty for a king is satirised. He pretends to be the Dauphin to deceive Joan of Arc, but she sees through him. She later claims to be pregnant with his child.

René's honeymoon, devoted with his bride to the arts, is imagined in Walter Scott's novel Anne of Geierstein (1829). The imaginary scene of his honeymoon was later depicted by the Pre-Raphaelite painters Ford Madox Brown, Edward Burne-Jones and Dante Gabriel Rossetti.

In 1845 the Danish poet Henrik Hertz wrote the play King René's Daughter about René and his daughter Yolande de Bar; this was later adapted into the opera Iolanta by Tchaikovsky.

René and his Order of the Crescent were adopted as "historical founders" by the Lambda Chi Alpha fraternity in 1912, as exemplars of Christian chivalry and charity. Ceremonies of the Order of the Crescent were referenced in formulating ceremonies for the fraternity.

In conspiracy theories, such as the one promoted in The Holy Blood and the Holy Grail, René has been alleged to be the ninth Grand Master of the Priory of Sion.

La Cheminée du roi René (The Fireplace of King René), op. 205, is a suite for wind quintet, composed in 1941 by Darius Milhaud.

Chant du Roi René (Song of King René) is a piece for organ (or harmonium) by Alexandre Guilmant (1837–1911) from his collection of Noels (Op.60). The theme used throughout this piece was alleged to have been written by René (Guilmant's source was Alphonse Pellet, organist at Nîmes Cathedral).

== Arms ==
René frequently changed his coat of arms, which represented his numerous and fluctuating claims to titles, both actual and nominal. The Coat of arms of René in 1420; Composing the arms of the House of Valois-Anjou (top left and bottom right), Duchy of Bar (top right and bottom left), and of the Duchy of Lorraine (superimposed shield). In 1434 were added Hungary, Kingdom of Naples and Jerusalem. The arms of the Crown of Aragon were shown from 1443 to 1470. In 1453 the arms of Lorraine were removed and in 1470 Valois-Anjou were substituted for the modern arms of the duchy (superimposed shield).

1420–1434

1434–1443

1443–1453

1453–1470

1470–1480

== See also ==
- Pas de la Bergère

== Sources ==
- Abulafia, David S. H. (1997), The Western Mediterranean Kingdoms: The Struggle for Dominion, 1200-1500, Pearson Education Limited203
- "René d'Anjou and de Lorraine"", Benezit Dictionary of Artists. Oxford Art Online, Oxford University Press
- Belleval, René (1901), Les bâtards de la Maison de France (in French), Librairie Historique et Militaire, pp. 103–104
- C. De Boer, ed. (1954), Ovide moralisé en prose (Texte du quinzième siècle), Verhandelingen der Koninklijke Nederlandse Akademie van Wetenschappen, Afd. Letterkunde, Nieuwe Reeks, Deel 61.2, Amsterdam: North-Holland Publishing Company
- Diller, Aubrey; Kristeller, Paul Oskar (1971), "Strabo", Catalogus Translationum et Commentariorum, 2: 225–33
- Gertz, Sunhee Kim (2010), Visual Power and Fame in René d'Anjou, Geoffrey Chaucer, and the Black Prince, Palgrave Macmillan66
- Kekewich, Margaret L. (2008), The Good King: Rene of Anjou and Fifteenth Century Europe, Palgrave Macmillan
- Morby, John E. (1978), "The Sobriquets of Medieval European Princes", Canadian Journal of History, 13 (1): 12, doi:10.3138/cjh.13.1.1
- Neubecker, Ottfried; Harmingues, Roger (1988), Le Grand livre de l'héraldique, Bordas, ISBN 2-04-012582-5
- Niccolini, Fausto (1925), L'arte napoletana del Rinascimento, Naples: Riccardo Ricciardi Editore, pp. 161–63
- Richardson, Carol M.; Woods, Kim W.; Franklin, Michael (2007), Renaissance Art Reconsidered: An Anthology of Primary Sources, pp. 193–96
- Baynes, T. S., ed. (1878), "René, Duke of Anjou" , Encyclopædia Britannica, vol. 2 (9th ed.), New York: Charles Scribner's Sons, pp. 58–59
- Sommé, Monique (1990). "Règlements, délits et organisation des ventes dans la forêt de Nieppe (début XIVe-début XVIe siècle)". Revue du Nord. 72 (287). Charles de Gaulle University: 511–528. doi:10.3406/rnord.1990.4564.

Attribution:

René of Anjou House of Valois-Anjou Cadet branch of the Capetian dynasty Born: 19 January 1409 Died: 10 July 1480
Regnal titles
Preceded by Louis I	Duke of Bar; 1420s–1480 with Louis I (1420s – 1430)	Succeeded by Yolande
Preceded by Charles II	Duke of Lorraine; 1431–1453 with Isabella	Succeeded by John II
Preceded by Louis III	Duke of Anjou; Count of Provence; 1434–1480	Succeeded by Charles IV
Preceded by Joanna II	King of Naples; 1435–1442	Succeeded by Alfonso I
