= Pas de la Dame Sauvage =

Series of jousts at Ghent in 1470

The Pas de la Dame Sauvage (French: "passage of the wild lady") was a pas d'armes held at Ghent in 1470 by the Burgundian knight Claude de Vauldray in the presence of Duke Charles the Bold and his court. The "wild lady" (dame sauvage) of the hastilude (a series of jousts defending a certain pass) was allegorical. In the epistle circulated by Claude to announce the games, he describes a romantic tale of a knight who "left the wealthy kingdom of Enfance (Childhood), and came to a wild poor and sterile land called Jeunesse (Youth)." The knight must make a "wild woman" his lady in the land of Youth, just as a young knight must prove himself through feats of arms (the pas d'armes) in order to merit a lady. The wild woman of the allegory is described as naked and covered only by her long blonde hair and a floral garland. In fact, Claude was led into the lists by a fleet of "wild" men and women.

It is possible that the festivities were held to celebrate the duke's subjugation of rebellious Ghent and the destruction of the Grand Privilege of Ghent.
