= Pas de la Bergère =

Passage of arms organized in 1449 in France

The Pas de la Bergère ("pas of the shepherdess") was a pas d'armes organized in 1449 by René of Anjou in Tarascon, in southern France.

The event started on May 1, 1449, and lasted for three days. Noblemen dressed as shepherds had to defend in turns a noblewoman dressed as a shepherdess. The winner received a kiss and flowers from this woman.
