= Margaret of Anjou =

Queen of England (1445–1461, 1470–1471)

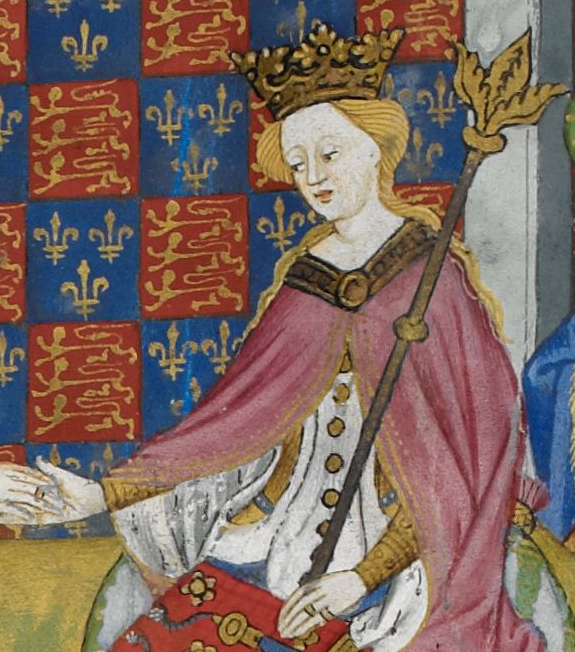
- Detail from the Talbot Shrewsbury Book, c. 1445

Queen consort of England
- Tenure: 23 April 1445 – 4 March 1461; 3 October 1470 – 11 April 1471
- Coronation: 30 May 1445

Queen consort of France
- Tenure: 23 April 1445 – 19 October 1453
- Born: 23 March 1430; Pont-à-Mousson, Duchy of Bar, Holy Roman Empire
- Died: 25 August 1482 (aged 52); Dampierre-sur-Loire, Anjou, France
- Burial: Angers Cathedral
- Spouse: Henry VI of England (m. 1445; died 1471)
- Issue: Edward of Westminster, Prince of Wales
- House: Valois-Anjou
- Father: René, King of Naples
- Mother: Isabella, Duchess of Lorraine

Margaret of Anjou (French: Marguerite; 23 March 1430 – 25 August 1482) was Queen of England by marriage to King Henry VI from 1445 to 1461 and again from 1470 to 1471. Through marriage, she was also nominally Queen of France from 1445 to 1453. Born in the Duchy of Lorraine into the House of Valois-Anjou, Margaret was the second eldest daughter of René of Anjou, King of Naples, and Isabella, Duchess of Lorraine.

Margaret was one of the principal figures in the series of dynastic civil wars known as the Wars of the Roses and at times personally led the Lancastrian faction. Some of her contemporaries, such as John de la Pole, 2nd Duke of Suffolk, praised "her valiant courage and undaunted spirit", and the 16th-century historian Edward Hall described her personality in these terms: "This woman excelled all other, as well in beauty and favour, as in wit and policy, and was of stomach and courage, more like to a man, than a woman".

Owing to her husband's frequent bouts of insanity, Margaret ruled the kingdom in his place. It was she who called for a Great Council in May 1455 that excluded the Yorkist faction headed by Richard of York, 3rd Duke of York. This provided the spark that ignited a civil conflict that lasted for more than 30 years, decimated the old nobility of England, and caused the deaths of thousands of men, including her only son, Edward of Westminster, Prince of Wales, at the Battle of Tewkesbury in 1471.

Margaret was taken prisoner by the victorious Yorkists after the Lancastrian defeat at Tewkesbury. In 1475, she was ransomed by her cousin, King Louis XI of France. She went to live in France as a poor relation of the French king, and she died there at the age of 52.

== Early life and marriage ==
=== Childhood ===
Margaret was born on 23 March 1430 at Pont-à-Mousson in Lorraine, a fief of the Holy Roman Empire east of France ruled by a cadet branch of the French kings, the House of Valois-Anjou. Margaret was the second daughter of René of Anjou and Isabella, Duchess of Lorraine. She had five brothers and four sisters, as well as three half-siblings from her father's relationships with mistresses. Her father, popularly known as "Good King René" (Bon Roi René), was duke of Anjou and titular king of Naples, Sicily, and Jerusalem; he has been described as "a man of many crowns but no kingdoms". Margaret was baptised at Toul in Lorraine and, in the care of her father's old nurse Theophanie la Magine, she spent her early years at the castle at Tarascon on the river Rhône in Provence and in the old royal palace at Capua, near Naples in the Kingdom of Sicily. Her mother took care of her education and may have arranged for her to have lessons with the scholar Antoine de la Sale, who taught her brothers. In childhood, Margaret was known as la petite créature (the little creature) and was interested in French romances and hunting.

Her family included several prominent women who exercised power in politics, war, and administration as regents and queen-lieutenants. Her mother, Isabella of Lorraine, fought wars on behalf of her husband while he was imprisoned in 1431–1432 and 1434–1436 by the duke of Burgundy, Philip the Good, and ruled the Duchy of Lorraine in her own right. Her paternal grandmother, Yolande of Aragon, ruled the Duchy of Anjou as regent for her son while Margaret was a child, repelling an English military presence and supporting the disinherited Charles VII of France (Dauphin). It has been suggested that this family example provided her with precedents for her later actions as regent for her son. Attitudes to women's exercise of power were different in Western Europe than in England at the time, with England more opposed to women exercising authority.

=== Marriage, concession of Maine, and subsequent rule ===
Margaret met with English envoys at Tours on 4 May 1444 to discuss her marriage to Henry VI of England. On 24 May, she was formally betrothed to Henry by proxy. Her uncle, Charles VII of France, who may have suggested the marriage as part of peace efforts between France and England near the conclusion of the Hundred Years' War, was present. The marriage was negotiated principally by William de la Pole, Duke of Suffolk, and the settlement included a remarkably small dowry of 20,000 francs and the unrealised claim, via Margaret's mother, to the territories of Mallorca and Menorca, which had been occupied for centuries by the Crown of Aragon. The marriage settlement also contained the promise of a twenty-three-month truce with France. Opinions were mixed as to the wisdom of the marriage, but the prevailing understanding was that it represented a genuine effort at peace.

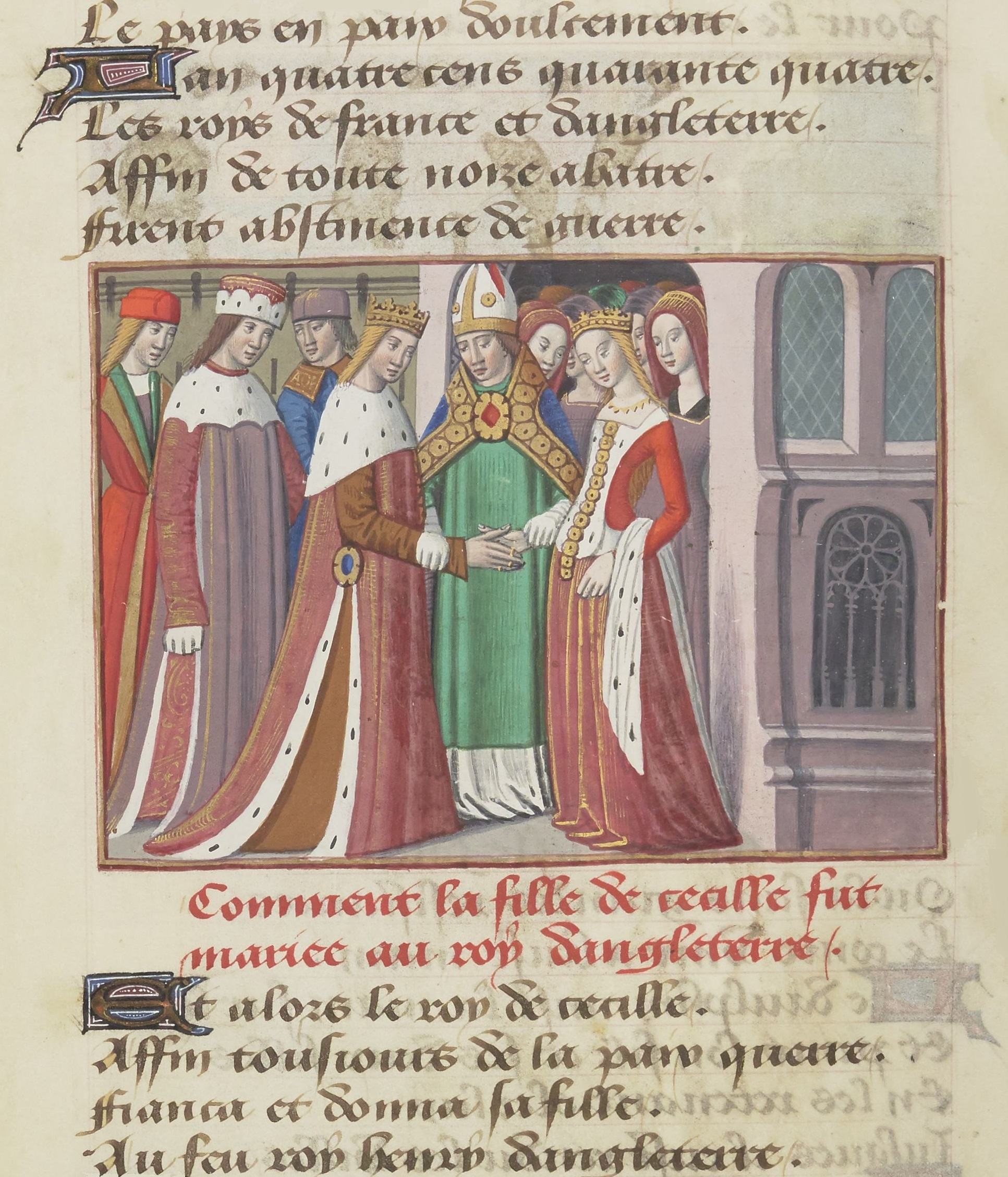
The marriage of Henry VI and Margaret of Anjou is depicted in this miniature from an illustrated manuscript of Vigilles de Charles VII by Martial d'Auvergne

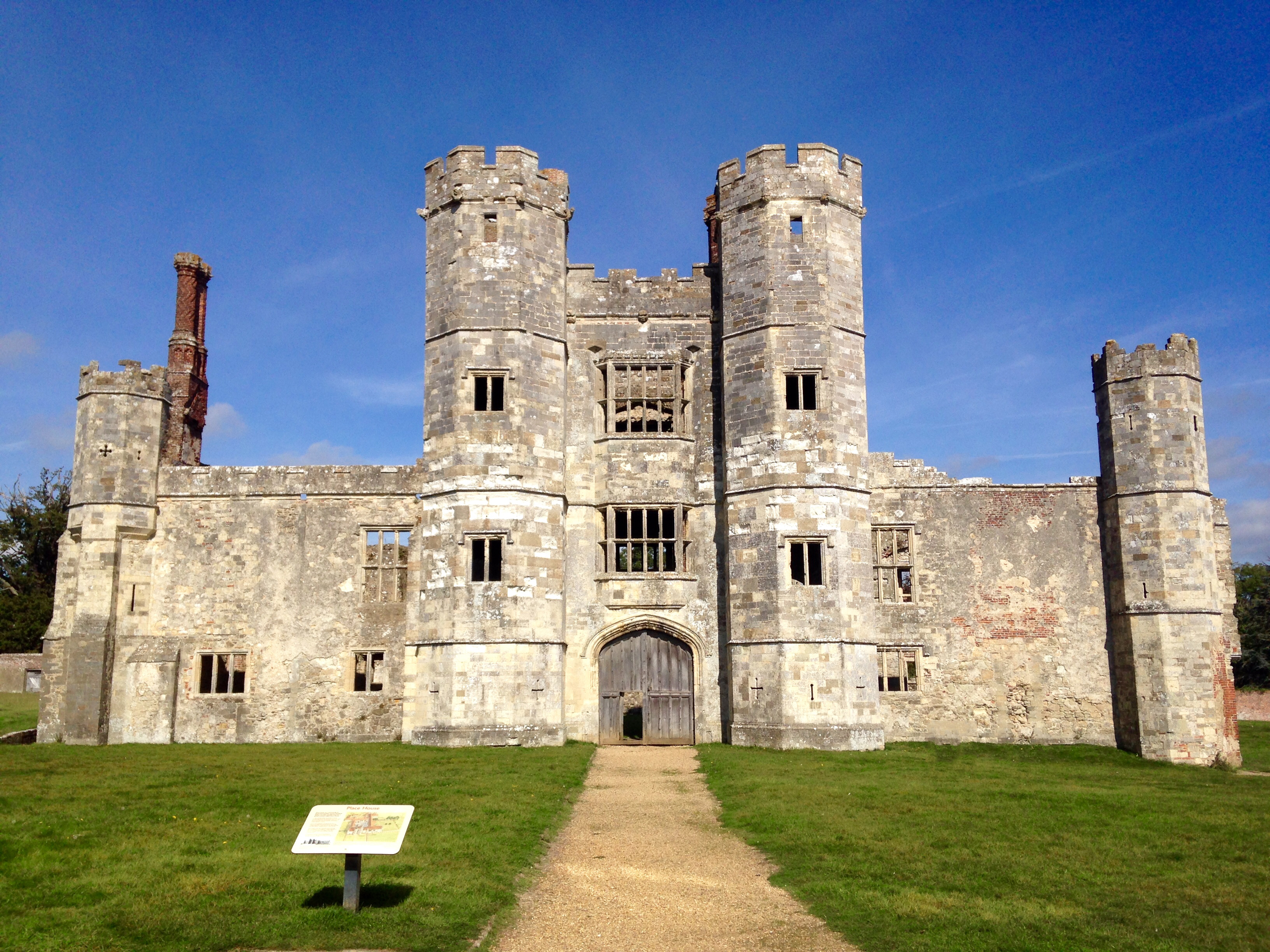
Titchfield Abbey in Hampshire

Loans were taken out by the government in order to pay for the considerable expense of transporting Margaret to England. Solicitation for the loans emphasised the role that the marriage, and Margaret herself, would play in seeking peace with France. This was a theme that continued throughout the preparations for her wedding. She arrived in England on 9 April 1445.

On 23 April 1445, Margaret married King Henry VI of England at Titchfield Abbey in Hampshire. She was fifteen and he was twenty-three. She then travelled to London accompanied by various lords and courtiers, arriving on 28 May 1445, where she was met by the mayor and aldermen of the city. The predicted turnout for her arrival and procession was so large that on 8 May, an inspection of roofs and balconies was ordered due to the expectation that spectators would use them as vantage points for her progress.

Her ceremonial progress through the city lasted two days, the intervening night spent, by custom, in the Tower of London. It was accompanied by eight theatrical pageants. Five of these pageants concerned the peace with France, casting Margaret as a symbol of, or the agent of, peace. Three spoke of her spiritual role as a redeemer and intercessor. It is uncertain whether these pageants represented a propaganda effort on the part of the Crown or reflected popular sentiment.

She was then crowned Queen of England on 30 May 1445 at Westminster Abbey by John Stafford, Archbishop of Canterbury. Those that anticipated the future return of English claims to French territory believed that she already understood her duty to protect the interests of the Crown fervently. The wedding and her transport were very expensive, estimated by some historians at more than £5,000.

Shortly after her coronation, René of Anjou entered negotiations with the English crown in an attempt to barter a lifetime's alliance and a twenty-year truce in exchange for the cession of the English-held territory of Maine to Anjou and Henry's agreement to abandon his claim to Anjou. Ultimately, the agreement ended without an alliance with Anjou and with the loss of Maine. Margaret, alongside Henry, corresponded closely with Charles VII regarding the agreement, attempting to act as a mediator.

The loss of Maine, regarded as a betrayal, was deeply unpopular with the English public, who were already inclined to mistrust Margaret due to her French origins. Blame was cast on William de la Pole, due to his role in negotiations. The reputation of Margaret's marriage suffered as a result, although she herself was not openly blamed for the loss.

In the early years of their marriage, prior to Henry's illness, Margaret and Henry spent significant proportions of their time together by choice. They shared an interest in education and culture. On 30 March 1448, she was granted licence to found Queens' College, Cambridge. Prior to 1453, there is little evidence of public political efforts on her part. Most of her surviving letters were written during that period, and the majority pertain to acts of intercession, mediation, and intervention in matters on which she had been asked to act, such as the arranging of marriages, the return of wrongfully taken property, and the collection of alms. These were expected and important parts of the role of a noblewoman or queen. Some were successful, and others regarded as high-handed or ill-thought-out. On one occasion, she recommended a man named Alexander Manning to the role of gaoler at Newgate; shortly after, he turned the prisoners loose in an act of protest at his rumoured dismissal for negligence and was then gaoled himself.

=== Birth of a son ===
Henry, who was more interested in religion and learning than in military matters, was not a successful king. He had reigned since he was only a few months old, and his actions had been controlled by protectors, magnates who were effectively regents. When he married Margaret, his mental condition was already unstable, and by the time of the birth of their only son, Edward of Westminster, Prince of Wales (born 13 October 1453), he had suffered a complete breakdown.

== Beginnings of the dynastic civil wars ==
=== Enmity between Margaret and the Duke of York ===
Margaret of Anjou's arms as Queen consort of England.

After retiring from London to live in lavish state at Greenwich, Margaret was occupied with the care of her young son and did not display any political inclinations until she believed her husband was threatened with deposition by the ambitious Richard of York, 3rd Duke of York, who, to her dismay, had been appointed Lord Protector while Henry was mentally incapacitated from 1453 to 1454. The duke was a credible claimant to the English throne, and by the end of his protectorship, there were many powerful nobles and relatives prepared to back his claim. Whereas the Duke of York was ambitious and capable, Henry (surrounded by corrupt advisers) was trusting, pliable, and increasingly unstable. Margaret herself was defiantly unpopular, grimly and gallantly determined to maintain the English crown for her progeny. Yet at least one scholar identifies the source of the eventual Lancastrian downfall not as York's ambitions nearly so much as Margaret's ill-judged enmity toward York and her over-indulgence in unpopular allies. Nevertheless, Queen Margaret was a powerful force in the world of politics.

Margaret's biographer Helen Maurer, however, disagrees with earlier historians having dated the much-vaunted enmity between the Queen and York to the time he obtained the office of the protectorship. She suggests the mutual antagonism came about two years later in 1455 in the wake of the First Battle of St Albans, when Margaret perceived him as a challenge to the king's authority. Maurer bases this conclusion on a judicious study of Margaret's pattern of presenting gifts; this revealed that Margaret took a great deal of care to demonstrate that she favoured both York and Edmund Beaufort, 2nd Duke of Somerset, equally in the early 1450s. Maurer also claims that Margaret appeared to accept York's protectorship and asserts there is no substantial evidence to back up the long-standing belief that she was responsible for the Yorkists' exclusion from the Great Council following Henry's recovery (see below).

The late historian Paul Murray Kendall, on the other hand, maintained that Margaret's allies Edmund Beaufort and William de la Pole, then Earl of Suffolk, had no difficulty in persuading her that York, until then one of Henry VI's most trusted advisers, was responsible for her unpopularity and already too powerful to be trusted. Margaret not only persuaded Henry to recall York from his post as governor in France and banish him instead to Ireland, she also repeatedly attempted to have him assassinated during his travels to and from Ireland, once in 1449 and again in 1450. Edmund Beaufort and Suffolk's joint responsibility for the secret surrender of Maine in 1448, and then the subsequent disastrous loss of the rest of Normandy in 1449 embroiled Margaret and Henry's court in riots, uprisings by the magnates, and calls for the impeachment and execution of Margaret's two strongest allies. It also might have made an ultimate battle to the death between Margaret and the House of York inevitable by making manifest Richard's dangerous popularity with the Commons. Richard of York safely returned from Ireland in 1450, confronted Henry, and was readmitted as a trusted advisor. Soon thereafter, Henry agreed to convene Parliament to address the calls for reform. When Parliament met, the demands could not have been less acceptable to Margaret: not only were both Edmund Beaufort and Suffolk impeached for criminal mismanagement of French affairs and subverting justice, but it was charged as a crime against Suffolk (now a duke) that he had antagonised the king against the Duke of York. Further, the demands for reform put forward included that the Duke of York be acknowledged as the first councillor to the king, and the Speaker of Commons, perhaps with more fervour than wisdom, even proposed Richard, Duke of York, be recognised as heir to the throne. Within a few months, however, Margaret had regained control of Henry, Parliament was dissolved, the incautious Speaker thrown in prison, and Richard of York retired to Wales for the time being.

== The Wars of the Roses ==
=== Early campaigns ===
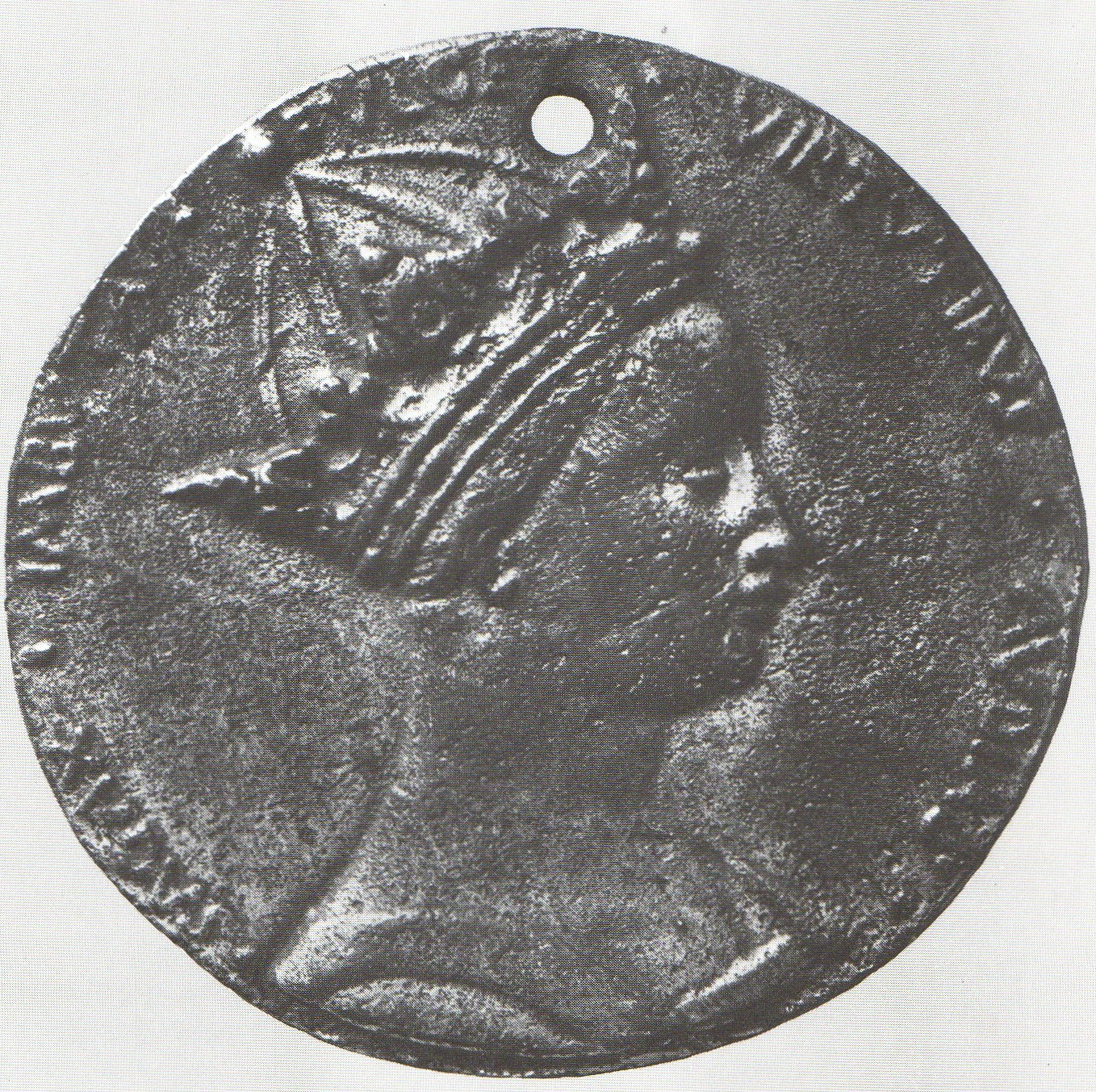
Portrait medallion of Margaret of Anjou, by Pietro di Martino da Milano, 1463

Hostilities between the rival Yorkist and Lancastrian factions flared into armed conflict in 1455 with provocations directed against the Duke of York that are reckoned as the beginning of the War of the Roses, in which Margaret asserted a decided role of leadership as the position of her husband deteriorated. In May, just over five months after Henry VI recovered from a bout of mental illness and Richard of York's protectorship had ended, Margaret and Henry called for a Great Council from which the Yorkists were excluded. The Council called for an assemblage of the peers at Leicester with the stated purpose to protect the king from his enemies. York, fearing that the purpose of the council was to destroy him, prepared for battle and soon was marching south to meet the Lancastrian army marching north. The Lancastrians suffered a crushing defeat at the First Battle of St Albans on 22 May 1455. Edmund Beaufort, the Earl of Northumberland and Lord Clifford were killed, Wiltshire fled the battlefield, and King Henry was taken prisoner by the victorious Duke of York. In March 1458, along with her husband and leading nobles of the warring factions, she took part in The Love Day procession in London. In 1459, hostilities resumed at the Battle of Blore Heath, where James Tuchet, 5th Baron Audley, was defeated and killed by the Yorkist army under the command of Richard Neville, 5th Earl of Salisbury.

In 1457, the kingdom was again shaken when it was discovered that Pierre de Brézé, a powerful French general and an adherent of Margaret, had landed on the English coast and burnt the town of Sandwich. As leader of a French force of 4,000 men from Honfleur, he aimed at taking advantage of the chaos in England. The mayor, John Drury, was killed in this raid. It thereafter became an established tradition, which survives to this day, that the Mayor of Sandwich wears a black robe mourning this ignoble deed. Margaret, in association with Brézé, became the object of scurrilous rumours and vulgar ballads. Public indignation was so high that Margaret, with great reluctance, was forced to give the Duke of York's kinsman Richard Neville, 16th Earl of Warwick, a commission to keep the sea for three years. He already held the post of Captain of Calais.

While Margaret was attempting to raise further support for the Lancastrian cause in Scotland, her principal commander, Henry Beaufort, 3rd Duke of Somerset, gained a major victory for her at the Battle of Wakefield on 30 December 1460 by defeating the combined armies of the Duke of York and the Earl of Salisbury. Both men were beheaded and their heads displayed on the gates of the city of York. As Margaret was in Scotland at the time of the battle, it was impossible that she issued the orders for their execution, despite popular belief to the contrary. Next was the Second Battle of St Albans (at which she was present) on 17 February 1461. In this battle, she defeated the Yorkist forces of Richard Neville, 16th Earl of Warwick, and recaptured her husband. After this battle, she ordered the execution of two Yorkist prisoners of war, William Bonville, 1st Baron Bonville, the rival of the loyal Lancastrian, the Earl of Devon, and Sir Thomas Kyriell. Both men had kept watch over King Henry, a prisoner to Warwick, to keep him out of harm's way during the battle. The king had promised the two knights immunity, but Margaret gainsaid him and ordered their execution by decapitation. It is alleged that she put the men on trial with her son presiding. "Fair son", she allegedly asked, "what death shall these knights die?" Prince Edward replied that their heads should be cut off, despite the king's pleas for mercy.

=== Sojourn to France ===
The Lancastrian army was beaten at the Battle of Towton on 29 March 1461 by the son of the late Duke of York, the future Edward IV of England, who deposed King Henry and proclaimed himself king. Margaret was determined to win back her son's inheritance and fled with him into Wales and later Scotland. Finding her way to France, she made an ally of her cousin, King Louis XI of France, and at his instigation, she allowed an approach from Edward's former supporter, Richard Neville, Earl of Warwick, who had fallen out with his former friend as a result of Edward's marriage to Elizabeth Woodville, and was now seeking revenge for the loss of his political influence. Warwick's daughter, Anne Neville, was married to Margaret's son Edward, Prince of Wales, in order to cement the alliance, and Margaret insisted that Warwick return to England to prove himself before she followed. He did so, restoring Henry VI briefly to the throne on 3 October 1470.

=== Final defeat at Tewkesbury ===
By the time Margaret, her son and daughter-in-law Anne were ready to follow Warwick back to England, the tables had again turned in favour of the Yorkists, and the Earl was defeated and killed by the returning King Edward IV in the Battle of Barnet on 14 April 1471. Margaret was forced to lead her own army at the Battle of Tewkesbury on 4 May 1471, at which the Lancastrian forces were defeated and her seventeen-year-old son Edward of Westminster was killed. The circumstances of Edward's death have never been made clear; it is not known whether he was killed in the actual fighting or executed after the battle by the Duke of Clarence. Over the previous ten years, Margaret had gained a reputation for aggression and ruthlessness, but following her defeat at Tewkesbury and the death of her only son, she was completely broken in spirit. After she was taken captive by William Stanley at the end of the battle, Margaret was imprisoned by the order of King Edward. It is said that Stanley informed Margaret of her son's death. Once she learned of this, she "had to be bodily dragged from the priory where she was hiding." She was sent first to Wallingford Castle and then was transferred to the more secure Tower of London. Henry VI was also imprisoned in the Tower in the wake of Tewkesbury and he died there on the night of 21 May; the cause of his death is unknown, though regicide was suspected, specifically smothering in his sleep. In 1472 she was placed in the custody of her former lady-in-waiting Alice Chaucer, Duchess of Suffolk, where she remained until ransomed by Louis XI of France in 1475.

== Final years and death ==
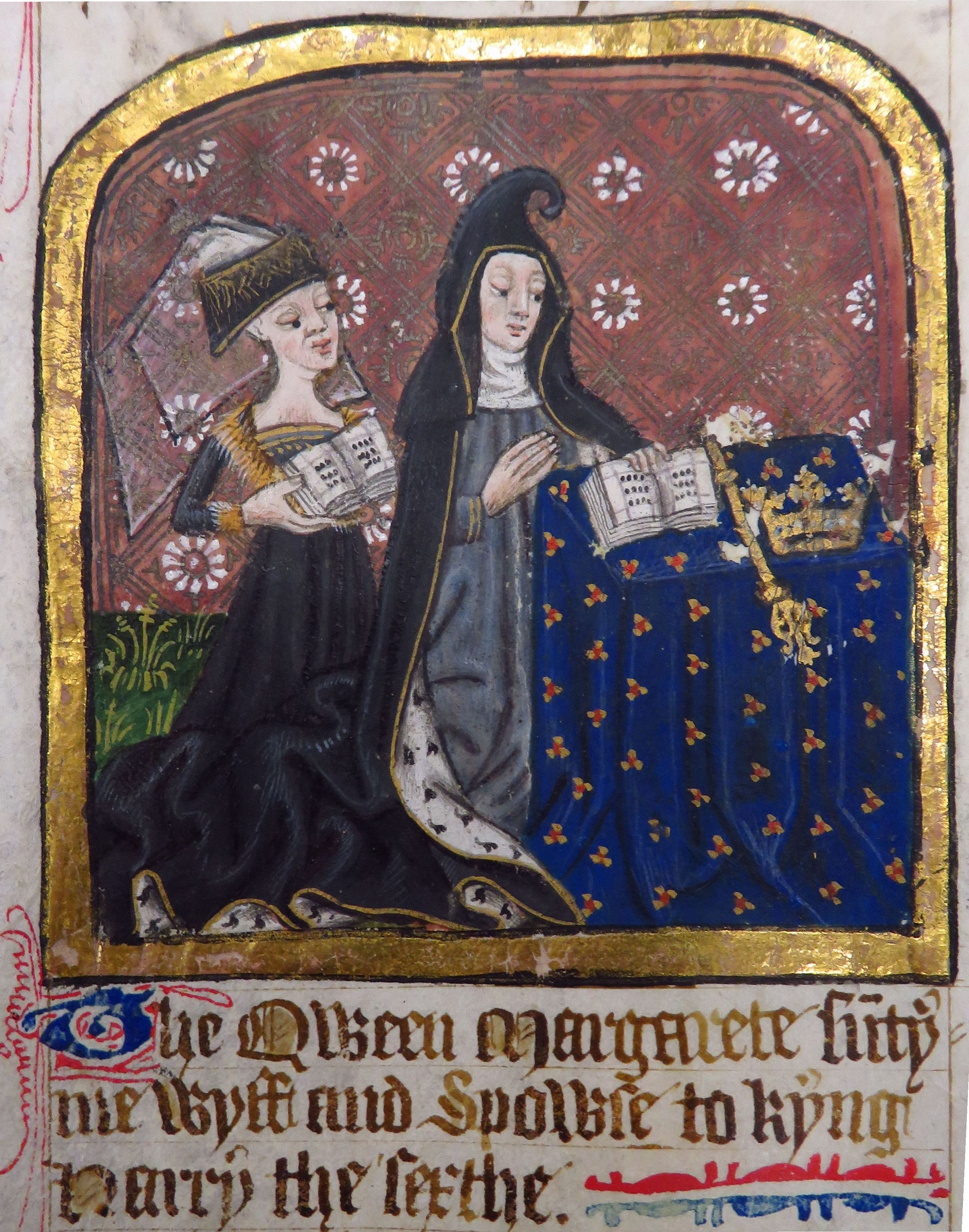
Margaret appears in an illumination in the Books of the Skinners Company, 1422. It was entered in the roll of the Fraternity of Our Lady in 1475.

Margaret lived in France for seven years as a poor relation of the King. She was hosted by Francis de Vignolles and died, impoverished, in his castle of Dampierre-sur-Loire, near Anjou on 25 August 1482 at the age of 52. Although her exact cause of death is unknown while living in poverty, her importance was never doubted. Her inheritance was given to King Louis XI of France. This was a term of agreement when she was ransomed from the English. She was entombed next to her parents in Angers Cathedral, but her remains were removed and scattered by revolutionaries who ransacked the cathedral during the French Revolution.

== Legacy ==
Many letters written by Margaret during her tenure as queen consort are still extant. One was written to the Corporation of London regarding injuries inflicted on her tenants at the manor of Enfield, which comprised part of her dower lands. Another letter was written to the Archbishop of Canterbury. Margaret's letters, which typically began with the words "By the Quene", are compiled in a book edited by Cecil Munro published for the Camden Society in 1863.

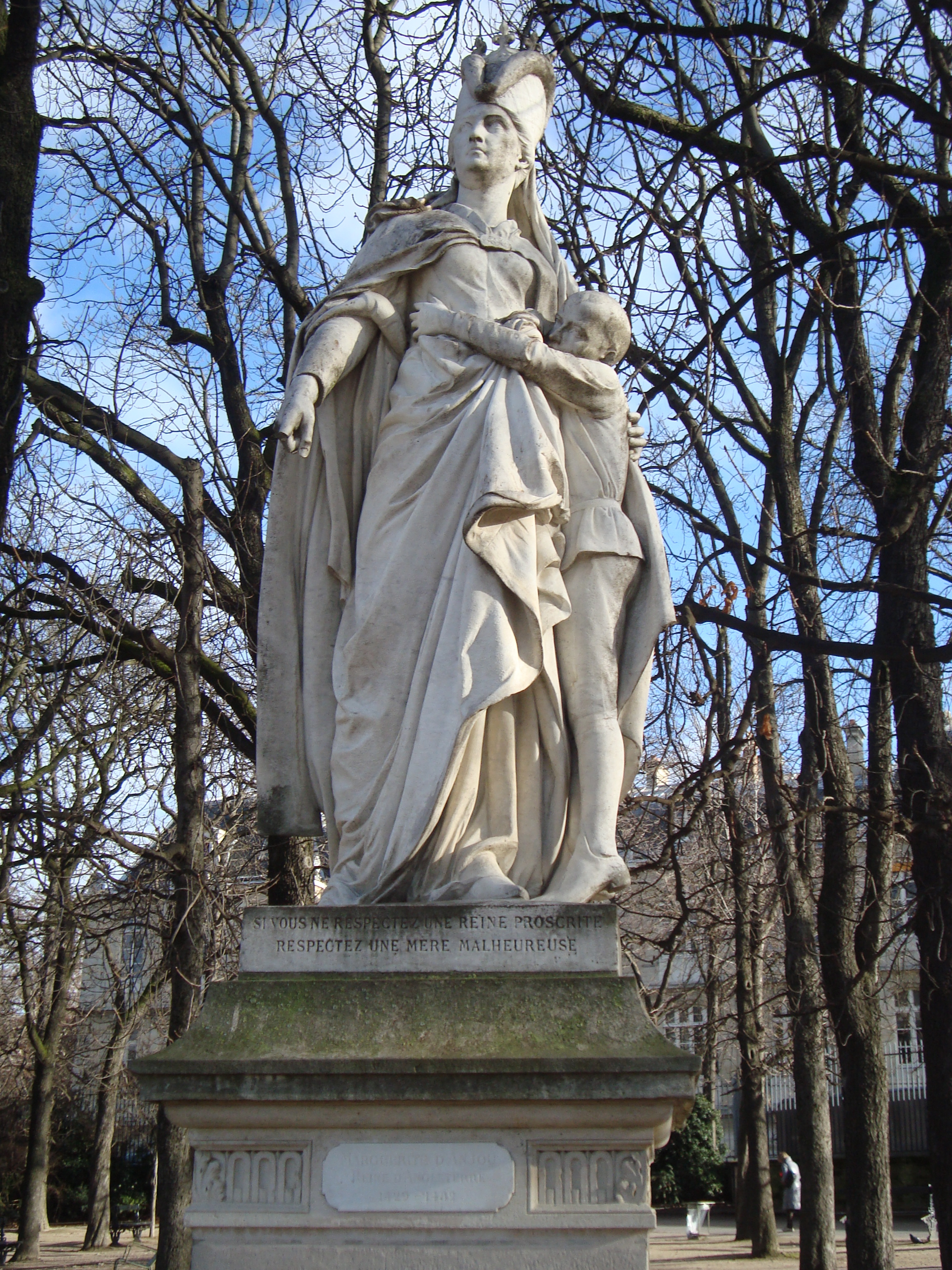
Margaret of Anjou in Luxembourg Garden, Paris.

Elizabeth Woodville (born ca 1437), later Queen of England as the wife of Margaret's husband's rival, King Edward IV, purportedly served Margaret of Anjou as a maid of honour. However, the evidence is too scanty to permit historians to establish this with absolute certainty; several women at Margaret's court bore the name Elizabeth or Isabella Grey.

== Depictions in popular culture ==
=== In William Shakespeare ===
Margaret is a major character in William Shakespeare's first tetralogy of History plays. Henry VI, Part 1, Part 2, Part 3 and Richard III. She is the only character to appear alive in all four plays, but due to the length of the plays, many of her lines are usually cut in modern adaptations. Shakespeare portrays Margaret as an intelligent, ruthless woman who easily dominates her husband and fiercely vies for power with her enemies. In Henry VI, Part 2 Margaret has an affair with the Duke of Suffolk and mourns his death by carrying around his severed head. In Henry VI, Part 3 Richard Plantagenet Duke of York famously calls her "She-wolf of France/ but worse than wolves of France/ Whose tongue more poisons than the adder's tooth!" Later, she personally stabs the Duke of York on the battlefield after humiliatingly taunting him and becomes suicidal when her son Edward is killed in front of her. Although in reality, Margaret spent the rest of her life outside England after the death of her husband and son, Shakespeare has her return to the court in Richard III. Margaret serves as a Cassandra-like prophetess; in her first appearance she dramatically curses the majority of the nobles for their roles in the downfall of the House of Lancaster. All of her curses come to pass as the noblemen are betrayed and executed by Richard of Gloucester, and each character reflects on her curse before his execution. Shakespeare had famously described Margaret: "How ill-beseeming is it in thy sex/ To triumph like an Amazonian trull/ Upon their woes whom Fortune captivates".

Margaret's prominence in Shakespeare has led many theatre-makers to interpret the story with her at the centre, drawing from the plays she is featured in. Being described as a powerful queen, Shakespeare writes her a crucial role for the action that unfolds in the War of the Roses. An adaptation called Margaret of Anjou by Elizabeth Schafer and Philippa Kelly was performed in 2016 in London by By Jove Theatre Company and an adaptation of the three Henry VI plays and Richard III entitled War of the Roses by Eric Ting and Philippa Kelly at California Shakespeare Theatre in 2018 gave Margaret great prominence. In 2018, the Royal Exchange Theatre in Manchester premiered Queen Margaret, using all the lines spoken by Margaret over the four plays with additional material by playwright Jeanie O'Hare.

=== In historical fiction ===
Margaret of Anjou appears in many novels of historical fiction.

Margaret is the main subject of:

- Red Rose of Anjou by Jean Plaidy
- The Queen of Last Hopes by Susan Higginbotham
- Blood and Roses by Catherine Hokin

Margaret also appears as a secondary or minor character in:

- The Lady of the Rivers by Philippa Gregory
- The Kingmaker's Daughter by Philippa Gregory
- "Anne Of Geierstein" by Sir Walter Scott

=== In TV ===
- In the 1965-1966 filmed theatre production series The Wars of the Roses Margaret featured in 7 of 11 episodes and was played by Peggy Ascroft.
- In the 2013 BBC series The White Queen Margaret was portrayed by Veerle Baetens.
- In The Hollow Crown, the 2012-2016 BBC adaption of Shakespeare's history plays, Margaret was played by Sophie Okonedo.

=== In Opera ===
- Fictionalized incidents based on Shakespeare concerning the life of Margaret of Anjou and her relationship with Richard, Duke of Gloucester (the future King Richard III of England), are the basis of the opera Margherita d'Anjou (1820), the earliest international success of the composer Giacomo Meyerbeer.

== Sources ==
- Abbott, Jacob (2004). History of Margaret of Anjou, Queen of Henry VI of England. Reproduction of 1871 text by Kessinger Press.
- Bagley, J. J. (1948). Margaret of Anjou, Queen of England. Herbert Jenkins.
- Brooke, C. N. L.; Ortenberg, V. (June 1988). "The Birth of Margaret of Anjou". Historical Research. 61 (146): 357–358. doi:10.1111/j.1468-2281.1988.tb01072.x.
- Boutell, Charles (1863). A Manual of Heraldry, Historical and Popular. Winsor & Newton.
- Cokayne, George Edward, ed. (1893). Complete peerage of England, Scotland, Ireland, Great Britain and the United Kingdom, extant, extinct or dormant (L to M). Vol. 5 (1st ed.). London: George Bell & Sons.
- Costain, Thomas B. (1962). The Last Plantagenets. Popular Library, New York.
- Fraser, Antonia (1975). The Lives of the Kings and Queens of England. University of California Press.
- Haigh, Philip A. (1995). The Military Campaigns of the Wars of the Roses. Alan Sutton Publishing Ltd. ISBN 978-0-938289-90-6.
- Hookham, Mary Ann (1872). The Life and Times of Margaret of Anjou, Queen of England and France. Tinsley brothers.
- Kendall, Paul Murray (1955). Richard the Third. George Allen & Unwin. OCLC 3007470.
- Laynesmith, J. L. (2004). The Last Medieval Queens: English Queenship 1445-1503. Oxford University Press. ISBN 978-0-19-924737-0.
- Maurer, Helen E. (2004). Margaret of Anjou: Queenship and Power in Late Medieval England. Boydell Press.
- Wagner, J. A. (2001). Encyclopedia of the Wars of the Roses. Santa Barbara. ISBN 1-85109-358-3.

Margaret of Anjou House of Valois Cadet branch of the Capetian dynasty Born: 23 March 1430 Died: 25 August 1482
English royalty
Vacant Title last held by Catherine of Valois	Queen consort of England; 23 April 1445 – 4 March 1461	Vacant Title next held by Elizabeth Woodville
Preceded by Elizabeth Woodville	Queen consort of England; 3 October 1470 – 11 April 1471	Succeeded by Elizabeth Woodville
