= Fontaine du Roi René =

Coordinates: 43.5271°N 5.4512°E

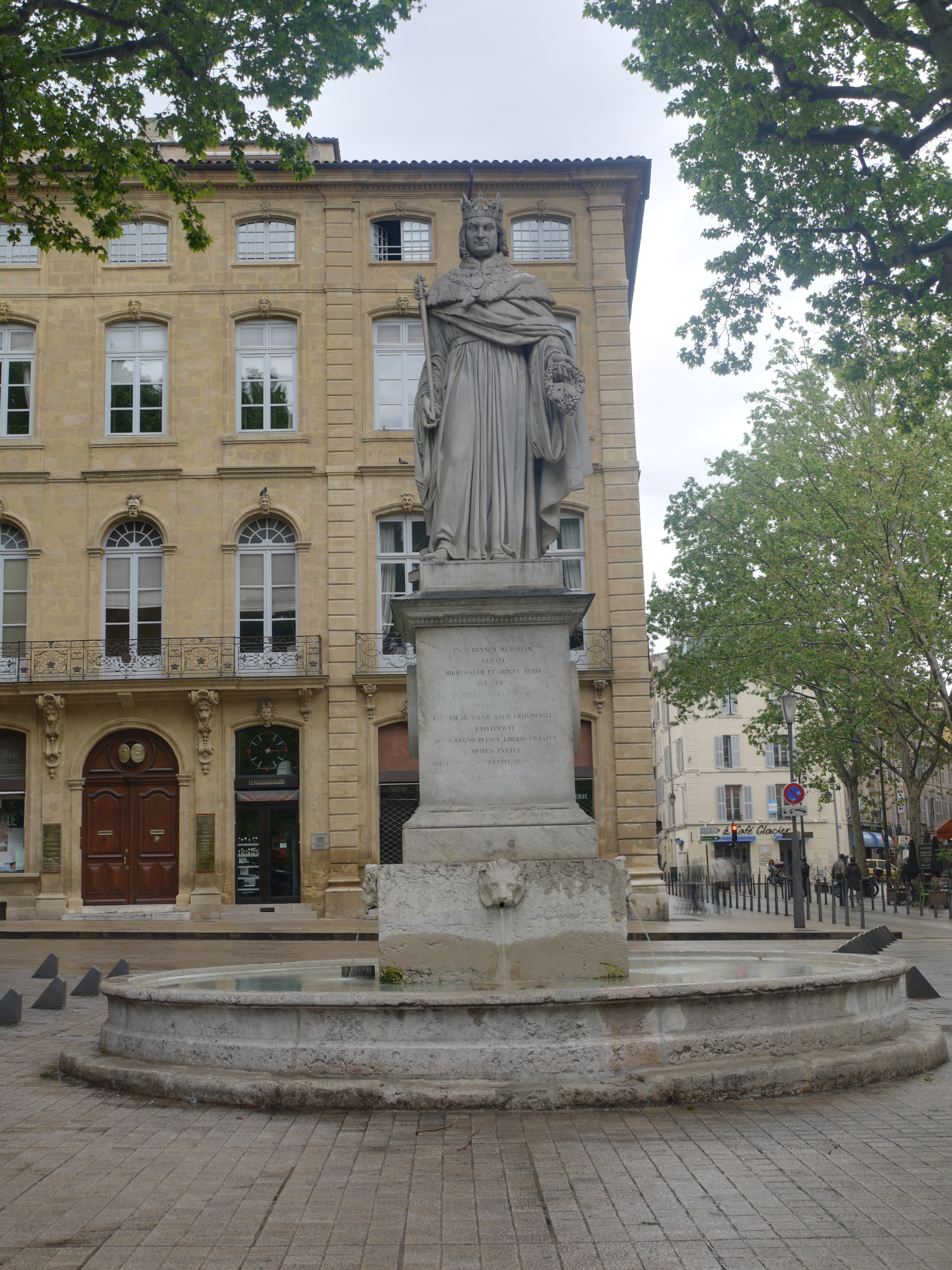
Fontaine du Roi René, with the Hôtel du Poët behind it.

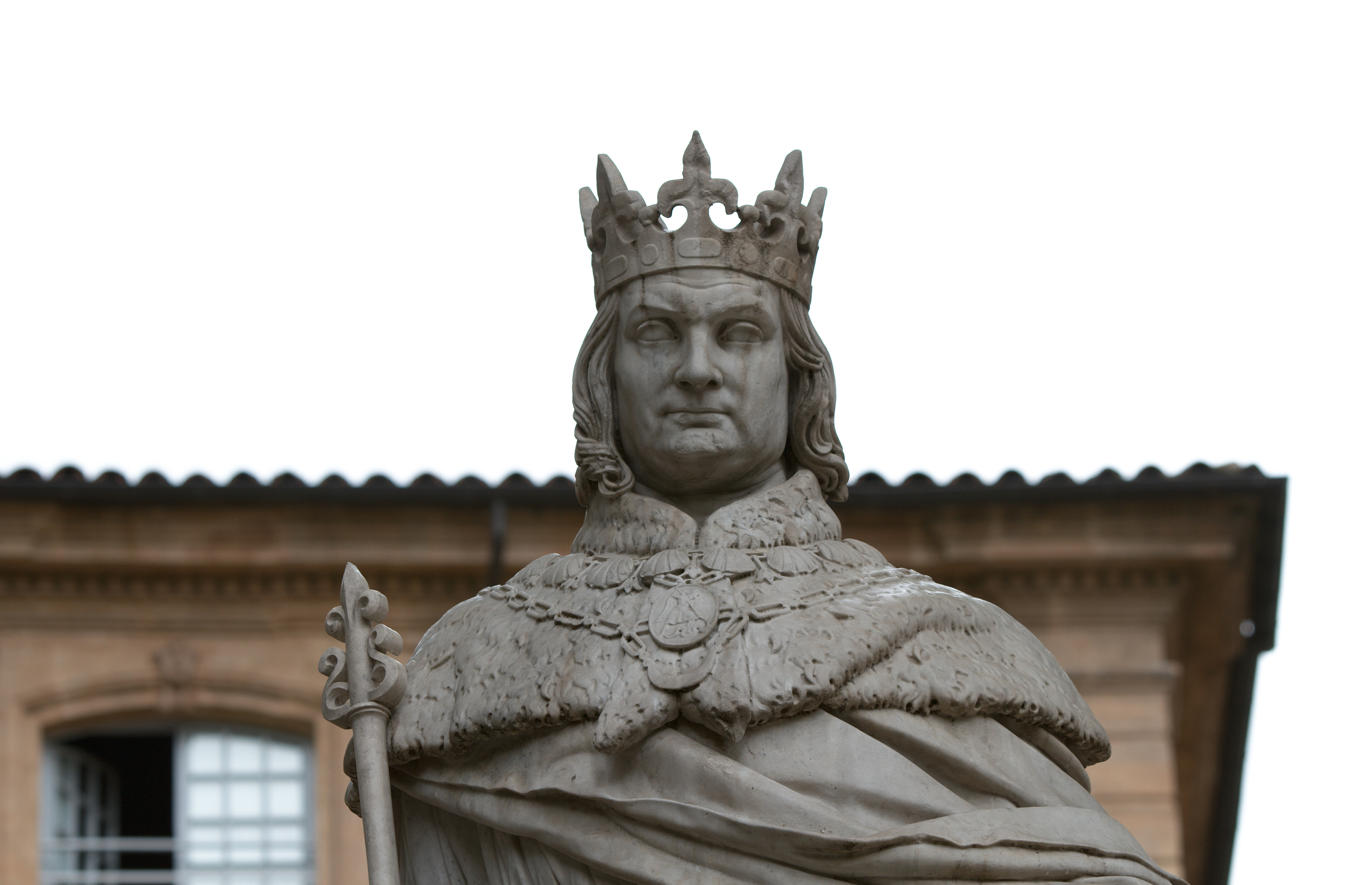
Top of the Fontaine du Roi René.

The Fontaine du Roi René is a listed fountain in Aix-en-Provence, Bouches-du-Rhône, France.

== Location ==
It is located at the top of the Cours Mirabeau in the centre of Aix-en-Provence.

== History ==
The fountain was designed by French architect Pierre-Henri Révoil (1776-1842) in 1819.

On top of the fountain, the statue was designed by French sculptor David d'Angers (1788–1856) in 1822, in honor of René of Anjou. It shows him holding muscat grapes, which he brought to Provence.

It was restored in 2009, to mark the 600th birthday of Roi René.

== Heritage significance ==
It is listed as a "monument historique".
