= Isabella, Duchess of Lorraine =

Queen of Naples (1435–1442) and Duchess of Lorraine (1431–1453)

Isabella
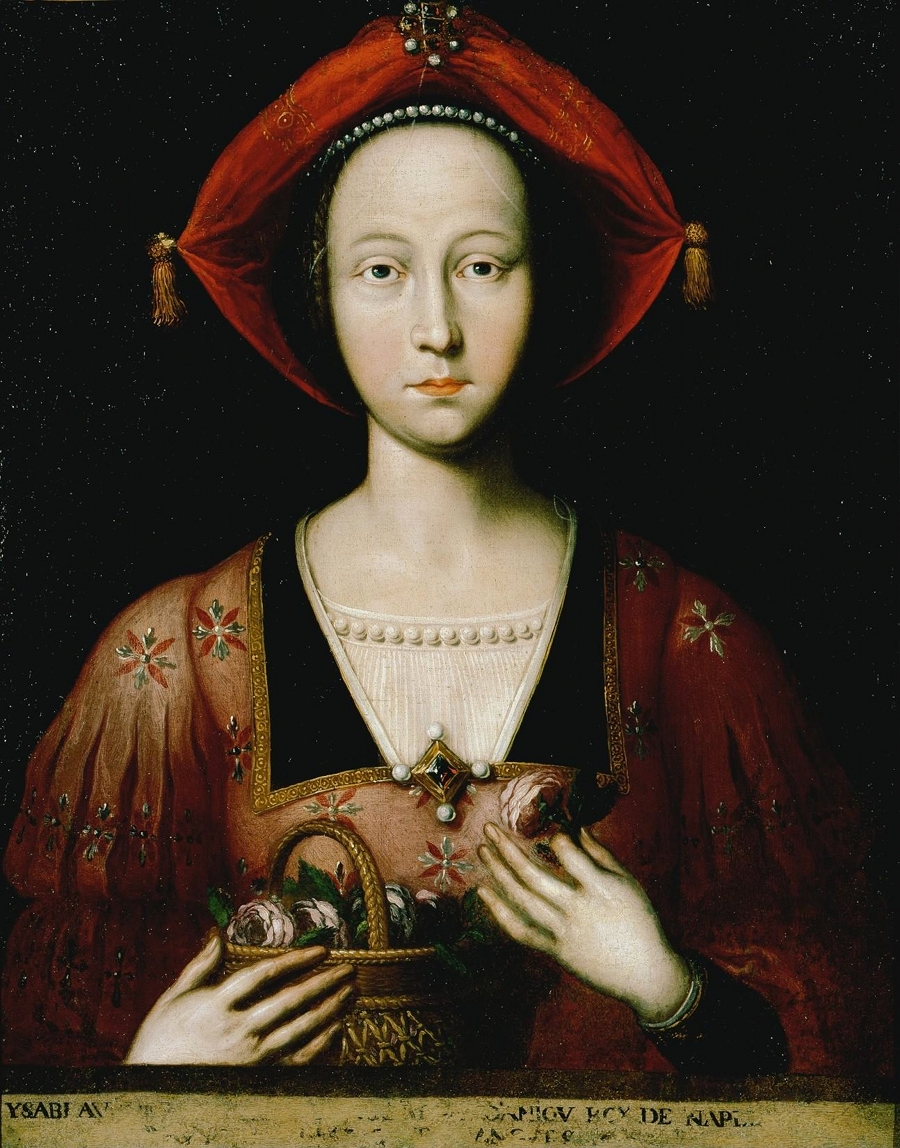

Duchess of Lorraine
- Reign: 25 January 1431 – 28 February 1453
- Predecessor: Charles II
- Successor: John II
- Co-ruler: René I

Queen consort of Naples
- Tenure: 2 February 1435 – 2 June 1442
- Born: 1400; France
- Died: 28 February 1453 (aged 53); France
- Spouse: René, King of Naples (m. 1419)
- Issue Detail: John II, Duke of Lorraine; Louis, Marquis of Pont-à-Mousson; Yolande, Duchess of Lorraine; Margaret, Queen of England
- House: Châtenois
- Father: Charles II, Duke of Lorraine
- Mother: Margaret of the Palatinate

Isabella (1400 – 28 February 1453) was suo jure Duchess of Lorraine from 25 January 1431 to her death in 1453. She was also Queen of Naples by marriage to René of Anjou. Isabella ruled the Kingdom of Naples and her husband's domains in France as regent during his imprisonment in Burgundy in 1435–1438.

== Life ==
Isabella was the eldest daughter of Charles II, Duke of Lorraine and Margaret of the Palatinate. By the death of her brothers, it was made apparent in 1410 that she would be the successor of her father in Lorraine. She was given a careful education, and described as beautiful, witty, brave and with the ability to be careful and make hard decisions in difficult circumstances.

On 24 October 1420, Isabella married René of Anjou. In the marriage contract, it was specified that she would inherit Lorraine, as he would inherit Bar and Pont-à-Mousson, and that their child and heir would inherit all their domains, thereby uniting them.

On 25 January 1431, Isabella inherited the duchy from her father upon his death, and ruled jointly with her husband as her co-ruler, as was customary for a female monarch at that time. Her right to rule was questioned by her cousin, Count Antoine de Vaudémont, who captured René in the Battle of Bulgnéville and had him imprisoned with his ally, the Duke of Burgundy. She led an army to rescue her husband from Philip III, Duke of Burgundy. She managed to secure a ceasefire, and the Emperor recognized her right to rule on 24 April 1434.

On November 1434, her imprisoned spouse inherited the domains of Anjou, Provence and Maine from his brother as well as the position of heir to the throne of Naples, and on 2 February 1435, he inherited the throne of Naples. René appointed her to act as his general governor until his release, and a Napolese embassy asked her to come to Naples to assume the post of regent until her spouse could do so in person. She left with her son Louis and a fleet. The mid-16th century Chronicle of Gaspare Fuscolillo records that Isabella arrived in Naples on 15 October 1435. As regent of Naples, was to face the struggle with the other competitor to the throne of Naples, Alfonso of Aragon. She was given military support from the pope, but could not cooperate well with its commander, Jacopo Caldora.

René was released in 1437, and arrived in Naples to take over the rule from Isabella in May 1438. Isabella left with Louis to return to Lorraine in August 1440. In Lorraine, she finally defeated Antoine de Vaudémont 27 March 1441. When Charles VII of France visited in Nancy, they introduced Agnes Sorel to him, who was one of Isabella's ladies-in-waiting. She soon afterwards became the king's influential mistress. In July 1445, Isabella appointed her son John to be her governor general in Lorraine, and retired to her manor Launay in Saumur.

Isabella died on 28 February 1453 at the age of 53. Her son John succeeded her as Duke of Lorraine. She was buried in Angers Cathedral. René then married, on 10 September 1454, Jeanne de Laval, but this marriage was childless.

== Issue ==
René and Isabella had the following children:

1. John II (2 August 1424 – 16 December 1470), Duke of Lorraine and King of Naples, married Marie de Bourbon, daughter of Charles I, Duke of Bourbon, by whom he had issue. He also had several illegitimate children.
2. Louis (16 October 1427 – between 22 May and 16 October 1444), Marquis of Pont-à-Mousson and Lieutenant General of Lorraine. At the age of five, in 1432, he was sent as a hostage to Dijon with his brother John in exchange for their captive father. John was released, but Louis was not and died of pneumonia in prison.
3. Nicholas (2 November 1428 – 1430), twin with Yolande.
4. Yolande (2 November 1428 – 23 March 1483), married Frederick ΙΙ of Lorraine, count of Vaudemont.
5. Margaret (23 March 1430 – 25 August 1482), married King Henry VI of England, by whom she had a son, Edward of Westminster, Prince of Wales.
6. Charles (1431 – 1432), Count of Guise.
7. Isabelle (died young).
8. René (died young).
9. Louise (1436 – 1438).
10. Anne (1437 – 1450, buried in Gardanne).

== See also ==
- Dukes of Lorraine family tree

== Sources ==
- Kekewich, Margaret L. (2008). The Good King: Rene of Anjou and Fifteenth Century Europe. Palgrave Macmillan.
- Wolffe, Bertram Percy (2001). Henry VI. Yale University Press.

French nobility
Preceded by Charles II	Duchess of Lorraine; 1431–1453 with René I	Succeeded by John II
Royal titles
Preceded by James II, Count of La Marche as king consort	Queen consort of Naples; 1435–1442	Succeeded by Maria of Castile
