= Pas de la Dame Inconnue =

Planned 1463 pas d'armes

The Pas de la Dame Inconnue ("pass of the unknown lady") was a pas d'armes planned for 1463, but which never took place.

An account of the planned pas is found in British Library manuscript Landsdowne 285. On 3 February 1463, "a gentleman claiming to be a foreigner" appeared at the court of Duke Philip the Good of Burgundy in Brussels bearing letters of credence from "an unknown lady" who claimed that her lands had been usurped by a more powerful neighbour. She asked that the duke supply three knights from his household to defend a pas against three knights from each kingdom in Christendom on 1 October 1463. The most valiant knight would then defend the lady's rights in closed lists on 1 April 1464. The three knights who volunteered to defend the pas were Anthony, bastard of Burgundy; Philippe de Crèvecœur; and Pedro Vázquez de Saavedra. They were at Saint Andrew's in Bruges in September 1463 awaiting the arrival of their opponents.

The heralds of Charles the Bold, Philip the Good's son and Anthony's half-brother, informed the courts of Europe of the unknown lady's appeal. By September, King Christian I sent a squire to the Burgundian court at Hesdin to inform them that he would be sending nine knights, three for each of his kingdoms of Denmark, Norway and Sweden. He also asked to be informed "of the secret of this pas, of the nature and condition of the lady and of her quarrel." According to the chronicler Georges Chastellain, the man behind the pas was the bastard of Burgundy himself, who hoped to surpass Jacques de Lalaing as one of the most renowned knights in Europe.

Although some pas d'armes were elaborately staged, even theatrical, productions, there is no evidence that the Pas de la Dame Inconnue was intended to be other than an authentic physical competition between knights. It was, however, never held. According to a letter of challenge written by one of Anthony's squires in 1466, the pas had been proclaimed throughout Christendom in 1463 before being called off because of Pope Pius II's crusade. Duke Philip summoned all those who had taken vows to compete in the pas to Bruges on 15 December 1463, where he announced his intention to honour the unknown lady by joining the crusade. The knights vowed to accompany him. In the event, Philip did not go, but the bastard Anthony departed Sluis on 21 May 1464 to join the papal fleet in Ancona.

== Bibliography ==
- Blunk, Catherine (2020). "Between Sport and Theatre: How Spectacular was the Pas d'armes?". In Alan V. Murray; Karen Watts (eds.). The Medieval Tournament as Spectacle: Tourneys, Jousts and Pas d'Armes, 1100–1600. Boydell & Brewer. pp. 120–138. doi:10.1017/9781787449237.009.
- Jourdan, Jean-Pierre (1992). "Le symbolisme politique du Pas dans le royaume de France (Bourgogne et Anjou) à la fin du Moyen-Âge". Journal of Medieval History. 18 (2): 161–181. doi:10.1016/0304-4181(92)90004-i.
- Kervyn de Lettenhove, Joseph (1870). "La joute de la Dame Inconnue à Bruxelles – La joute du sire de Commines et du sire de Jonvelle à Bruges". Bulletin de la commission royale de l'histoire. 11: 473–486.
- Lindner, Annette (1991). "L'influence du roman chevaleresque français surle pas d'armes". Publications du Centre Européen d'Études Bourguignonnes. 31: 67–78. doi:10.1484/j.pceeb.2.302267.
- Moffat, Ralph Dominic (2010). The Medieval Tournament: Chivalry, Heraldry and Reality An Edition and Analysis of Three Fifteenth-Century Tournament Manuscripts (PDF) (PhD dissertation). University of Leeds.
- Riquer, Martín de (1967). Caballeros andantes españoles. Editorial Espasa-Calpe.
