= Pas d'armes =

14th–15th century chivalric practice

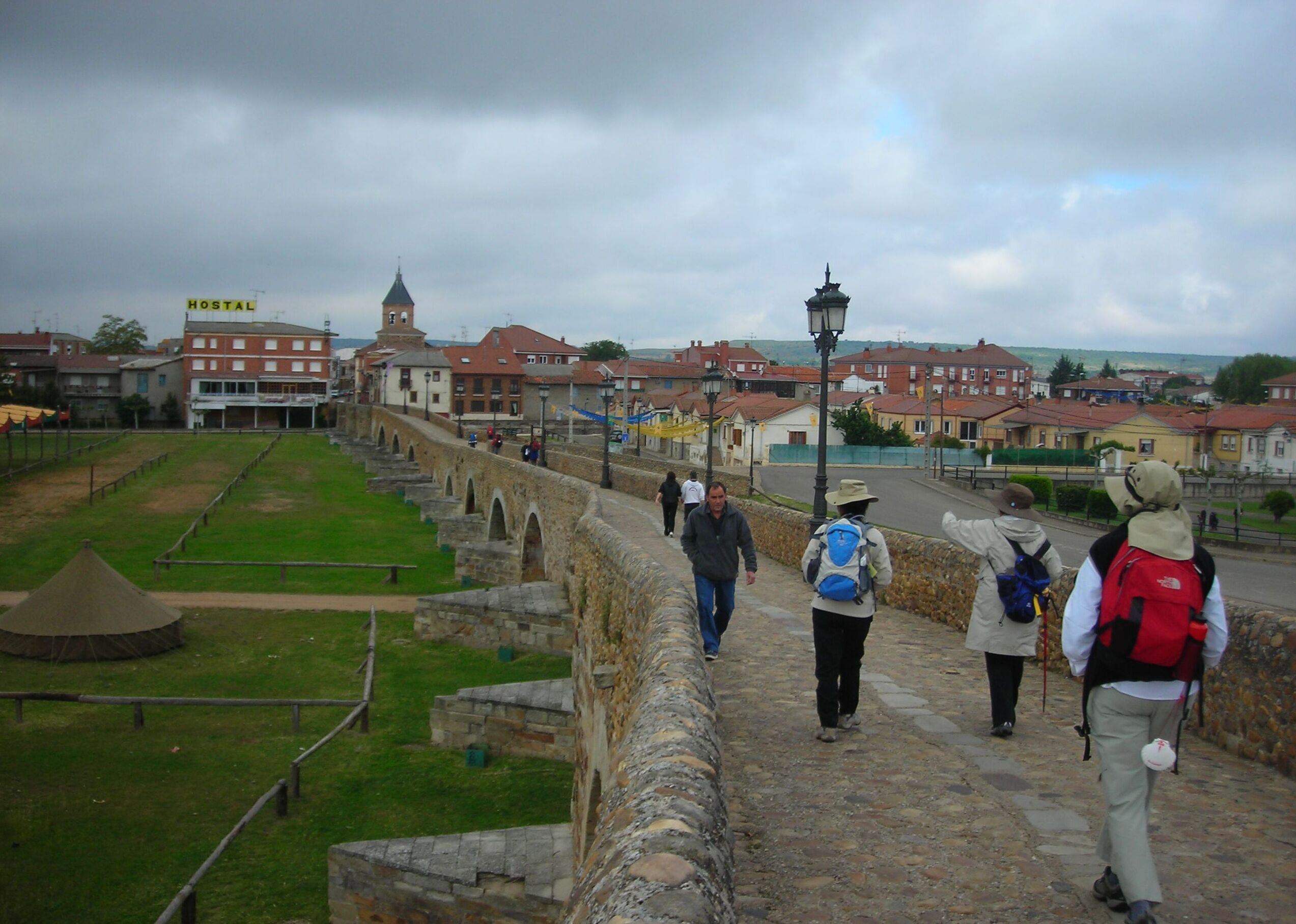
In 1434 on this spot—the bridge over the river Órbigo—Suero de Quiñones and ten of his knights challenged all comers to a pas d'armes, promising to "break 300 lances" before moving on.

The pas d'armes (French pronunciation: [pa daʁm]) or passage of arms was a type of hastilude (martial game) that evolved in late 14th century chivalry and remained popular through the 15th century. It involved a knight or group of knights (tenans or "holders") who would stake out a traveled spot, such as a bridge or city gate, and let it be known that any other knight who wished to pass (venans or "comers") must first fight, or be disgraced. If a traveling venant did not have weapons or horse to meet the challenge, one might be provided, and if the venant chose not to fight, he would leave his spurs behind as a sign of humiliation. If a lady passed unescorted, she would leave behind a glove or scarf, to be rescued and returned to her by a future knight who passed that way.

== Origins ==
The origins of pas d'armes can be found in a number of factors. During the 14th and 15th centuries the chivalric idea of a noble knight clashed with new more deadly forms of warfare, as seen during the Hundred Years' War, when commoner yeomanry armed with longbows could attack noble knights anonymously from a distance, breaking traditional rules of chivalry, and cavalry charges by knights could be broken by the pikemen formations introduced by the Swiss.

At the same time, the noble classes began to differentiate themselves, in many ways, including through reading courtly literature such as the very popular chivalric romances of the 12th century. For the noble classes the line between reality and fiction blurred, the deeds they read about were real, while their deeds in reality were often deadly, if not comical, re-enactments of those they read about. This romanticised "Chivalric Revival" manifested itself in a number of ways, including the pas d'armes, round table and emprise (or empresa, enterprise, chivalrous adventure), and in increasingly elaborate rules of courtesy and heraldry.

== Accounts ==
There are many thousands of accounts of pas d'armes during this period. One notable and special account is that of Suero de Quiñones, who in 1434 established the Passo Honroso ("Pass[age] of Honour") at the Órbigo bridge in the Kingdom of León (today's Castile and León in Spain). This road was used by pilgrims from all over Europe on the way to shrine at Santiago de Compostela. Suero and ten knights promised to "break 300 lances" before relinquishing the pas d'armes, jousting for over a month, as chronicled in great detail by town notary Don Luis Alonso Luengo, later published as Libro del Passo honroso. After 166 battles, de Quiñones and his men were so injured they could not continue and declared the mission complete. Suero de Quiñones became legendary, and was mentioned in Don Quixote, the 1605 satire on the notion of romantic chivalry out of touch with reality.

== List of pas d'armes ==
- Passo de la Fuerte Ventura (1428)
- Suero de Quiñones' Passo Honroso (Órbigo, 1434)
- Pas de l'Arbre Charlemagne (Dijon, 1443)
- Pas du Rocher Périlleux (1445)
- Pas de la Pastourelle (around 1445)
- Pas de Nancy (Nancy, 1445)
- Pas de la Joyeuse Garde (1446)
- Pas de la Belle Pèlerine (Saint-Omer, 1449)
- Pas de la Bergère (1449)
- Pas de la Fontaine aux Pleurs (Chalon-sur-Saône, 1449–1450)
- Pas du Chevalier au Cygne (Lille, 1454)
- Pas du Pin aux Pommes d'Or (1455)
- Pas de la Dame Inconnue (1463)
- Pas du Perron Fée (Bruges, (1463)
- Pas de l'Arbre d'Or, (Bruges, 1468)
- Pas de la Dame Sauvage (Ghent, 1470)

== See also ==
- Black Knight (Monty Python)
- Combat of the Thirty
- Tournament (medieval)

== Sources ==
- Odile Blanc, Les stratégies de la parure dans le divertissement chevaleresque. In: Communications, 46, 1987. Parure pudeur étiquette, sous la direction de Olivier Burgelin, Philippe Perrot et Marie-Thérèse Basse. pp. 49–65. doi:10.3406/comm.1987.1686.
- Sébastien Nadot, Joutes, emprises et pas d'armes en Bourgogne, Castille et France, 1428–1470, thèse de doctorat soutenue à l'EHESS Paris en avril 2009.
- Sébastien Nadot, Rompez les lances ! Chevaliers et tournois au Moyen Age, Editions autrement, Paris, 2010.
- Riquer, Martín de (1967). Caballeros andantes españoles. Madrid: Editorial Espasa-Calpe.
