= Louis of Anjou, Marquis of Pont-à-Mousson =

Marquis of Pont-à-Mousson (1427-1443/44)

Louis of Anjou (16 October 1427 – d. 1443 c.1444) was marquis of Pont-à-Mousson from 1441 to 1443. He was preceded and succeeded in the title by his father. He was the third son of René of Anjou and his first wife Isabella, Duchess of Lorraine. He and his brother Jean were given as hostages to the Burgundians in April 1432 in return for freeing their father René, who had been captured by the Burgundians. John was released, but Louis was not and he died of pneumonia in prison at the age of sixteen. He was interred at the Church of St. Anthony in Pont-à-Mousson.
