= Beatrice of Naples =

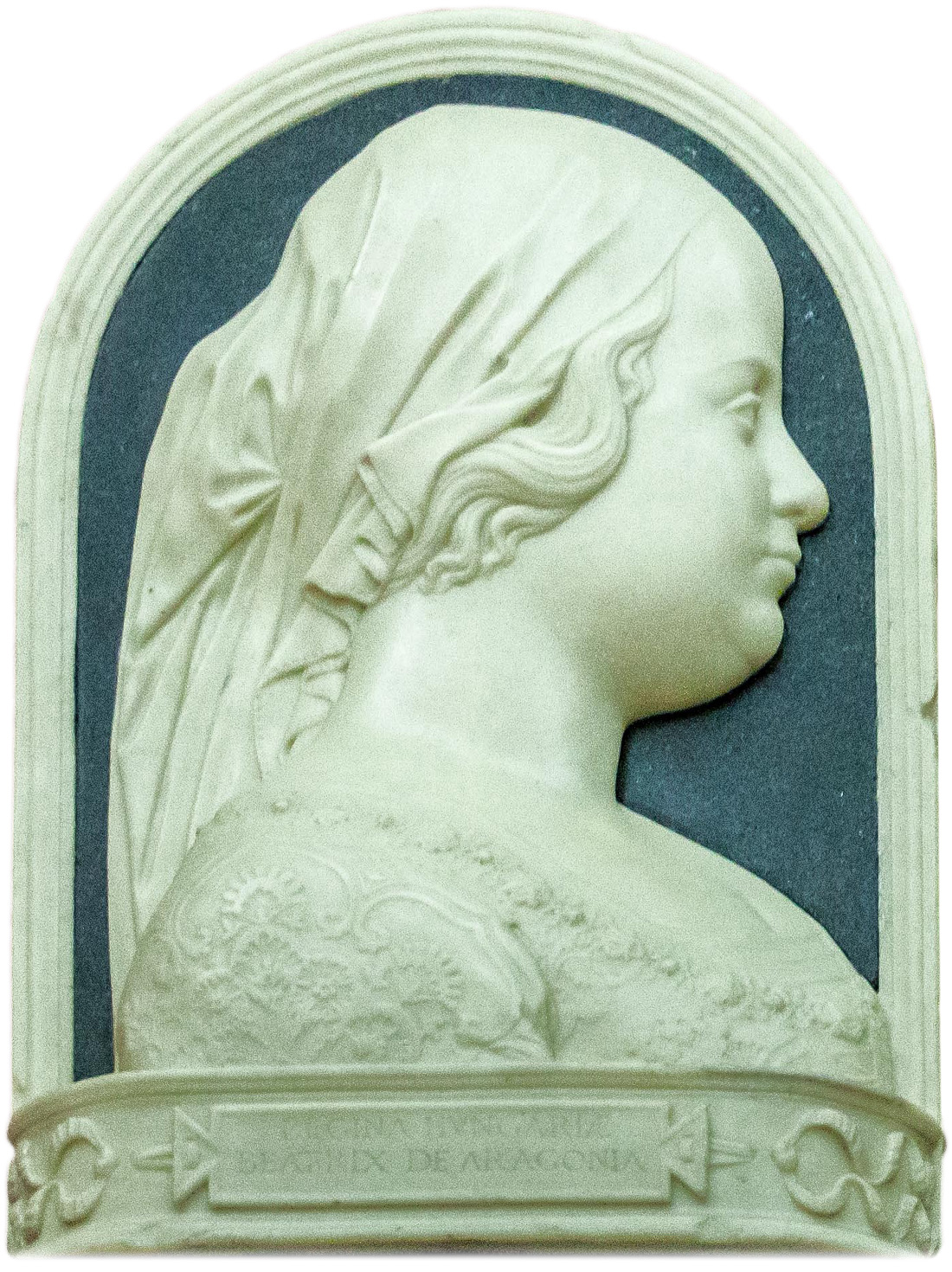

Queen consort of Hungary and Bohemia
- Tenure: 1476–1490
- Coronation: 12 December 1476, Székesfehérvár
- Tenure: 1491–1502
- Born: 16 November 1457; Naples
- Died: 23 September 1508 (aged 50); Naples
- Spouse: Matthias Corvinus (m. 1476, d. 1490); Vladislaus II of Hungary (m. 1491, annul. 1500)
- House: Trastámara
- Father: Ferdinand I of Naples
- Mother: Isabella of Clermont

Beatrice of Naples (16 November 1457 – 23 September 1508), also known as Beatrice of Aragon (Hungarian: Aragóniai Beatrix; Italian: Beatrice d'Aragona), was twice Queen of Hungary and of Bohemia by marriage to Matthias Corvinus and Vladislaus II. She was the daughter of Ferdinand I of Naples and Isabella of Clermont.

== Biography ==
Beatrice received a good education at her father's court in Naples. She was engaged in 1474 and married Matthias in Buda on 22 December 1476. She was crowned Queen of Hungary in Székesfehérvár. The marriage secured an alliance between Hungary and Naples.

In 1480, when an Ottoman fleet seized Otranto in the Kingdom of Naples, at the earnest solicitation of the pope he sent the Hungarian general, Blaise Magyar, to recover the fortress, which surrendered to him on 10 May 1481.

Again in 1488, Matthias took Ancona under his protection, occupying it with a Hungarian garrison. Beatrice exerted some influence in the policy of Hungary. She also had a cultural importance by introducing the Italian renaissance into the court of Hungary, an interest she shared with Matthias. She encouraged his work with the Bibliotheca Corviniana, built the palace Visegrád as a residence for the court, and created an academy. She wished to participate in policy: in 1477, she accompanied Matthias during the invasion of Austria, and in 1479, she was present during the peace treaty between Matthias and Vladislaus II.

In 1479, their relationship became tense when Matthias awarded his illegitimate son John (János) Corvinus with a fief and invited John's mother, Barbara Edelpöck, to court. Matthias died before Beatrice ever conceded that his son János should be the rightful heir.

Upon his death in 1490, Beatrice managed to keep a power position by the support of the Hungarian nobility and continue as queen of Hungary by marriage to the next monarch. After the death of Matthias Corvinus, she wrote a letter to Simon Keglevich; she addressed this letter to king Simon Keglevich, then only the commander of Matthias Corvinus. She offered him to become as a mother to his children. He declined this offer; he delivered this letter to the parliament, and he became the ambassador of the parliament to the king. She presided as a royal representative at the parliament where the next king was elected, with the Hungarian crown placed at her side. It is believed she could not control Janos and was claimed illegitimate by her second husband but these claims all cannot be verified nor can they be completely ignored.

Vladislaus II of Bohemia and Hungary wrote in the same year 1490 many letters with the same text to many of the Hungarian nobility. He wrote that Beatrice had written to him, that Matthias Corvinus and Beatrice had decided that Stephen Zápolya, the father of John Zápolya, should become the next duke of Austria after Matthias Corvinus. Beatrice married her second husband, Vladislaus II of Bohemia and Hungary, in 1491. Beatrice had great support by the Hungarian nobility, and the nobility had demanded of Vladislav that he marry her. This marriage was yet again childless. Formally, the marriage was questioned, as her spouse was not granted a divorce from his first wife by the pope.

Her husband claimed that he did not regard the marriage as legal, and that he had been forced to marry her against his will, and in 1493, a commission was issued to investigate. In 1500, the pope declared the marriage to be illegal, and Beatrice was forced to pay the costs of the trial. Beatrice returned to Naples, where she arrived in 1501, and in 1502 Vladislaus could marry Anne of Foix-Candale. Beatrice died in Naples.

== Ancestry ==
Ancestors of Beatrice of Naples

16. John I of Castile
8. Ferdinand I of Aragon
17. Eleanor of Aragon
4. Alfonso V of Aragon
18. Sancho Alfonso, 1st Count of Alburquerque
9. Eleanor of Alburquerque
19. Beatrice of Portugal
2. Ferdinand I of Naples
10. Enrico Carlino
5. Giraldona Carlino
11. Isabella
1. Beatrice of Naples
24. Bérenger VI, Lord of Clermont-Lodève
12. Dèodat II, Lord of Clermont-Lodève
6. Tristan of Clermont
26. Arnaud III, Lord of Roquefeuil
13. Isabeau de Roquefeuil
27. Hélène de Gordoun de Castelnau
3. Isabella of Clermont
28. Nicola Orsini, Count of Nola
14. Raimondo Orsini del Balzo, Prince of Taranto
29. Maria del Balzo
7. Catherine of Taranto
30. John of Enghien
15. Mary of Enghien
31. Sancia del Balzo

== Sources ==
- J. Macek, Tři ženy krále Vladislava, Mladá fronta, Praha, 1991.
- kol. autorov, Encyklopédia Slovenska, Veda, Bratislava, 1977.

Beatrice of Naples House of Trastámara Born: 1457 Died: 1508
Royal titles
Preceded by Catherine Podiebrad	Queen consort of Bohemia and Hungary; 1476–1490	Succeeded by Barbara of Brandenburg
Preceded by Barbara of Brandenburg	Queen consort of Bohemia and Hungary; 1491–1500	Succeeded by Anne of Foix-Candale
