= Copertino =

- Comune
- Comune di Copertino
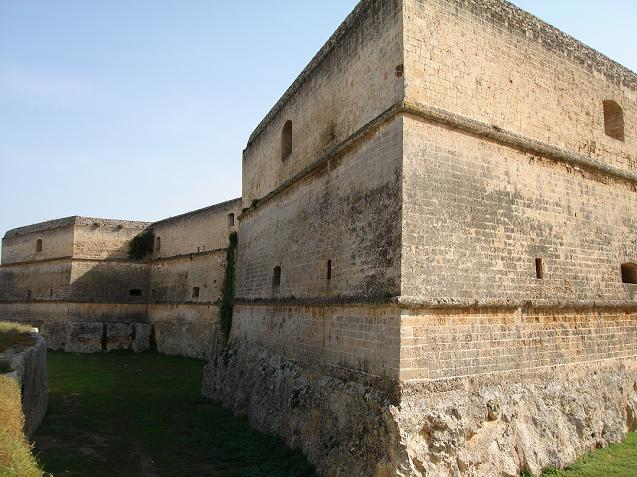
- Castle.

- Coat of arms

- Location of Copertino in Italy Copertino (Apulia)
- Coordinates: 40°16′N 18°03′E
- Country: Italy
- Region: Apulia
- Province: Lecce (LE)

Government
  - Mayor: Vincenzo De Giorgi

Area
  - Total: 57.76 km^{2} (22.30 sq mi)
- Elevation: 34 m (112 ft)

Population (30 June 2017)
  - Total: 24,113
  - Density: 417.5/km^{2} (1,081/sq mi)
- Demonym: Copertinesi
- Time zone: UTC+1 (CET)
  - Summer (DST): UTC+2 (CEST)
- Postal code: 73043
- Dialing code: 0832
- ISTAT code: 075022
- Patron saint: St. Joseph of Cupertino
- Saint day: 18 September
- Website: Official website

Copertino (Italian pronunciation: [koperˈtiːno]; historical English: Cupertino; Salentino: Faugnu [Fauɲu]), also known in English as Cupertino, is a town and comune in the province of Lecce in the Apulia region of south-east Italy.

== History ==
Following Charles of Anjou's successful campaign in 1266, the Hohenstaufen tower of Copertino was held first by the de Pratis family and then by Walter VI of Brienne, Duke of Athens, Count of Lecce and Grand Constable of France.

Copertino became the centre of a County under the Enghiens, who were sovereigns of the land of Galatone, Leverano and Veglie. With the marriage of Mary of Enghien, Countess of Lecce and Copertino (later Queen of Naples and titular Queen of Sicily, Jerusalem, and Hungary) to Raimondo del Balzo Orsini, the county became part of the principality of Taranto. The French knight Tristan Chiaromonte (de Clermont-Lodeve) led the development of the county capital, having assumed power over the territory on his marriage to Caterina, daughter of Mary of Enghien. Tristan's daughter Isabella of Clermont, heiress to the Brienne claim to the Kingdom of Jerusalem, married Ferdinand I of Naples. With the conquest of the Salento peninsula by the Aragonese dynasty, effected jointly by the Spanish army and knights from Albania, the county was gifted in 1498 to Alfonso Castriota Scanderbeg, in gratitude for military support.

The Princes of Belmonte gained the Castle through the Squarciafico Counts of Copertino, to whom the fief passed from 1557.

== Copertino DOC ==
The area around Copertino is permitted to make red and rosé Italian DOC wine. The grapes are limited to a harvest of 14 tonnes/ha with the finished wines needing a minimum of 12% alcohol. The wines are predominantly Negroamaro with no more than a 30% blend component of Malvasia, Montepulciano and Sangiovese (which is further limited to a maximum of 15%). Wines labeled Riserva must be aged for a minimum of 2 years prior to release and have a minimum alcohol level of 12.5%.

== Main sights ==
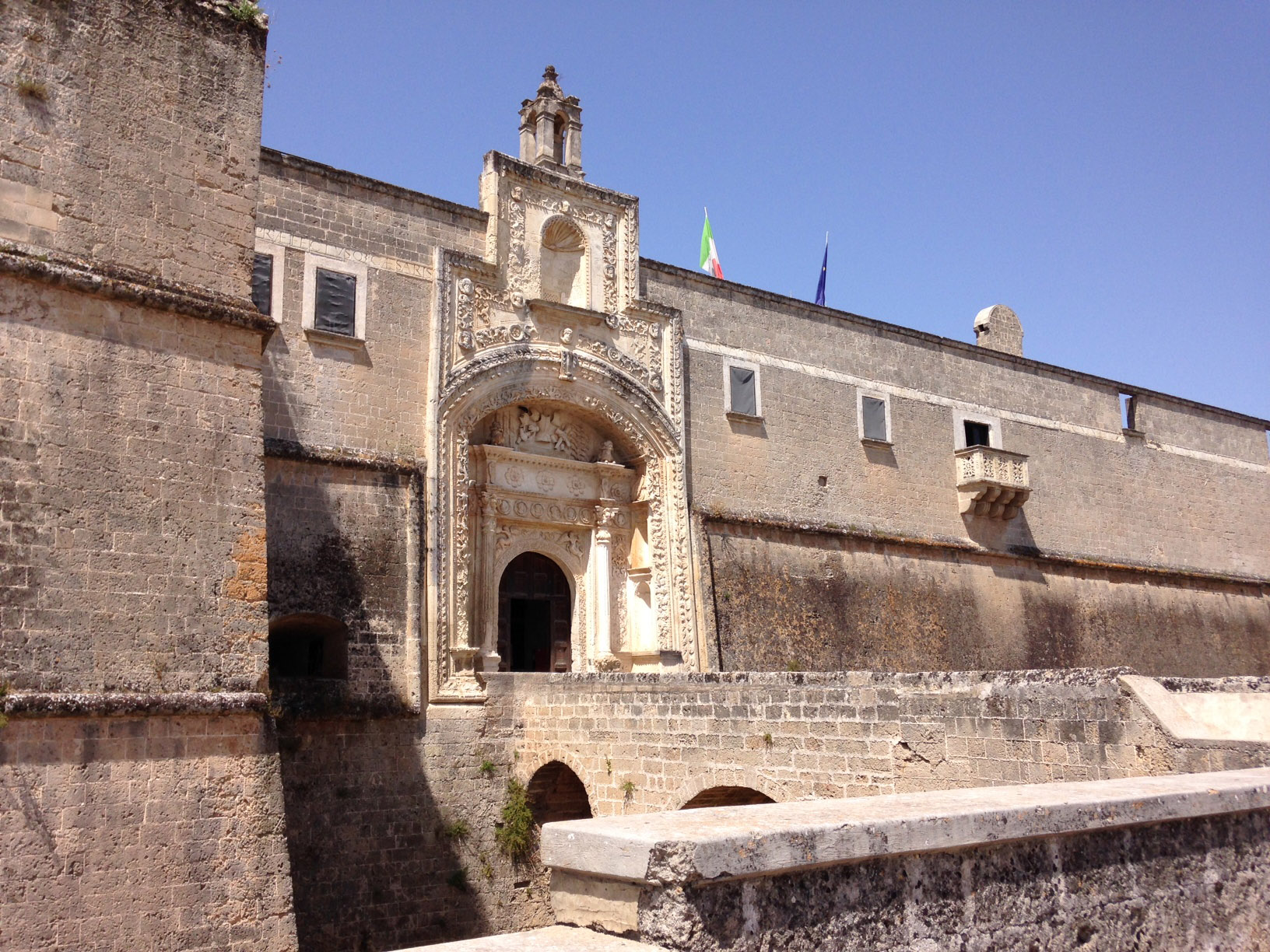
Copertino's castle

- Copertino Castle, built by architect Evangelista Menga in 1540 on a previous Norman and Angevin fortress, is one of the most massive fortifications in Apulia.
- Sanctuary of St. Joseph of Copertino
- Sanctuary and monastery of La Grottella

== Twinnings ==
- Cupertino, United States (named after St. Joseph of Copertino)
- Osimo, Italy
- Poggiardo, Italy

== Notable people ==
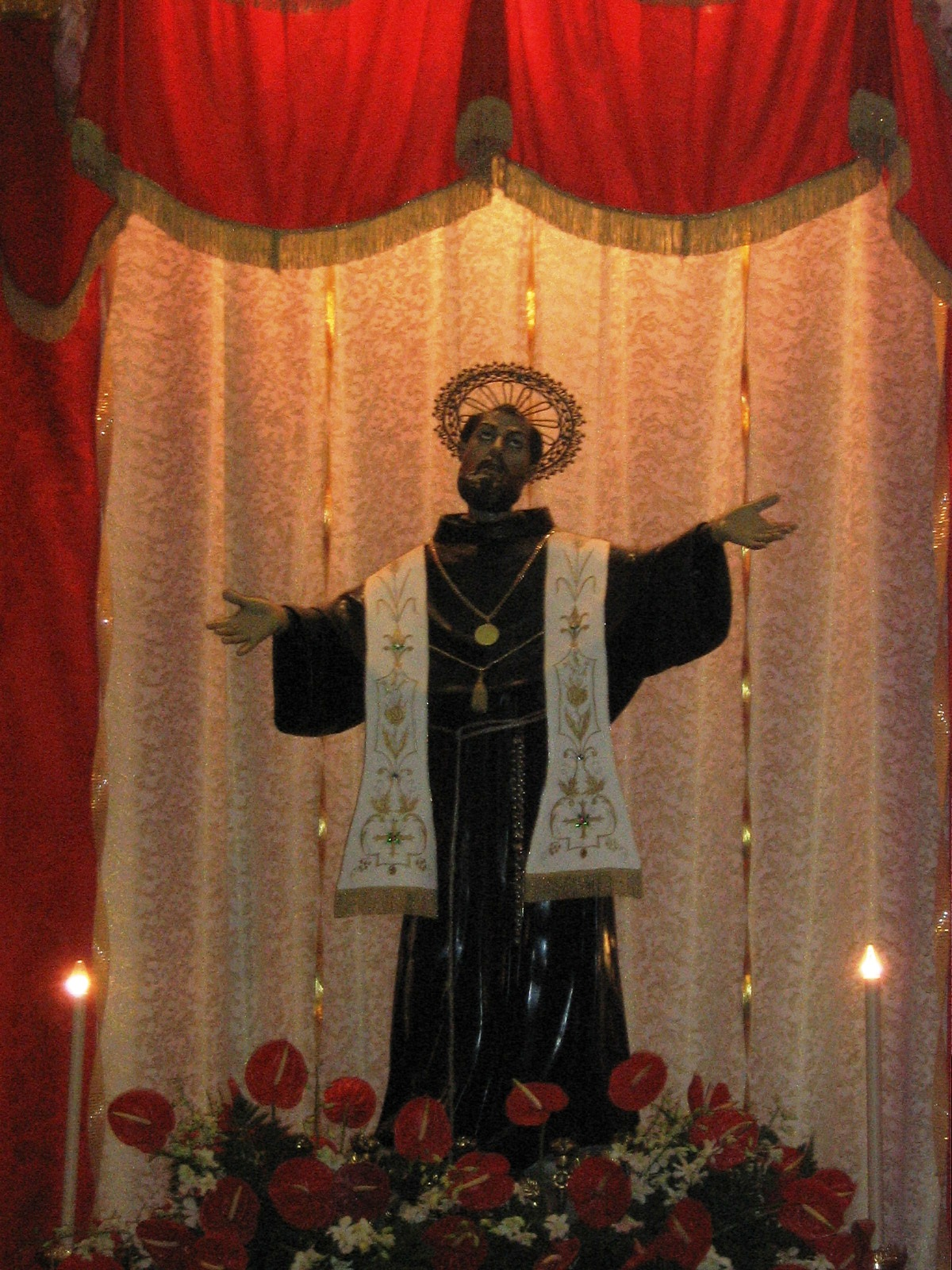
Statue of St. Joseph in Copertino

- Joseph of Cupertino (1603–1663), Christian mystic and saint
- Cristina Conchiglia (1923-2013), trade unionist and politician, Mayor Emeritus of Copertino
- Giuliano Sangiorgi (born 1979), singer of Negramaro
- Graziano Pellè (born 1985), footballer
- Adriano Pappalardo (born 1945), singer
- Beatrice Rana (born 1993), pianist
