= Copertino Castle =

XIII century Angevin castle in Copertino, Italy

Coordinates: 40.2736°N 18.0442°E

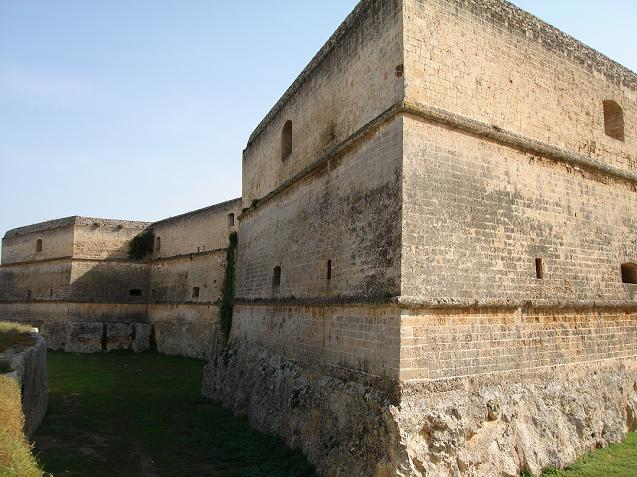
View of the bastions.

The Copertino Castle (Italian: Castello di Copertino) is a castle in Apulia, southern Italy. It is located in the eponymous city of Copertino, north of Gallipoli on the heel of Apulia, between Manduria and Galatina.

== Overview ==
Like the castle of Otranto, Copertino was built for the defence of the peninsular of the Salento. The castle was originally built in the Norman period, and altered significantly for Alfonso Castriota by Charles V's renowned fortifications expert Evangelista Menga in 1540, in response to significant military developments including the use of gunpowder. The alterations included a ditch and majestic bastions with 90 arrow slits to allow cannon movements. Copertino therefore incorporates an Angevin keep, being later enlarged to a quadrangle plan with a tapered rampart at each of the four corners. The entrance portal is in Catalan-Durazzesque style, conceived as a triumphal arch, with the entrance to the family chapel of St Mark to the right of the entrance vestibule. The chapel itself is decorated with 15th Century frescoes by the mannerist painter Gianserio Strafella.

The Castle's inner courtyard includes several enormous galleries, and to the left of the Castle's entrance is the porticoed palace built for the Squarciafico Pinelli, Counts of Copertino and Marquesses of Galatone, ancestors of the Princes of Belmonte. Copertino Castle is one of the largest fortresses constructed in Apulia.

It is held in local folklore that Isabella of Clermont, daughter of Tristan de Clermont and Catherine of Taranto, who later became Queen of Naples, was born at Copertino Castle.
