= Lizzanello =

- Comune
- Comune di Lizzanello
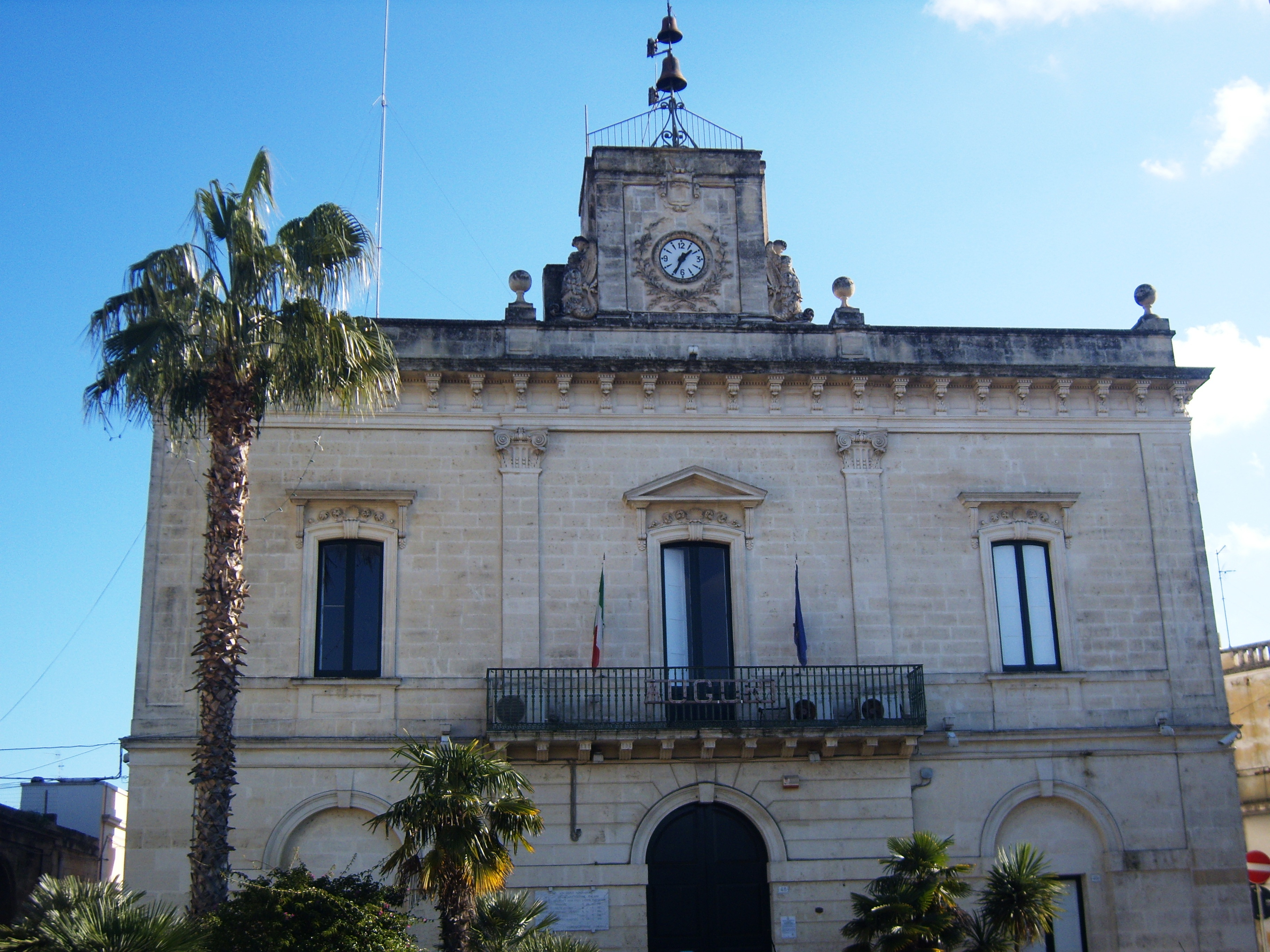
- Town Hall

- Coat of arms

- Lizzanello within the Province of Lecce

- Location within Italy Location within Apulia
- Coordinates: 40°18′18.2″N 18°13′16.6″E
- Country: Italy
- Region: Apulia
- Province: Lecce (LE)
- Frazioni: Merine

Government
  - Mayor: Fulvio Pedone

Area
  - Total: 25.42 km^{2} (9.81 sq mi)
- Elevation: 45 m (148 ft)

Population (31 May 2017)
  - Total: 11,916
  - Density: 468.8/km^{2} (1,214/sq mi)
- Demonym: Lizzanellesi
- Time zone: UTC+1 (CET)
  - Summer (DST): UTC+2 (CEST)
- Postal code: 73023
- Dialing code: 0832
- ISTAT code: 075038
- Patron saint: St. Lawrence
- Saint day: 10 August
- Website: Official website

Lizzanello (Salentino: Lizzanieḍḍu) is a town and comune in the province of Lecce in the Apulia region of south-east Italy.

Lizzanello is located in the southeastern suburb of Lecce (6 km far), next to Cavallino, and is part of Salento. The municipality borders with Caprarica di Lecce, Castri di Lecce, Cavallino, Lecce and Vernole. It counts the hamlet (frazione) of Merine.

== People ==
- Cosimo De Giorgi (1842-1922), scientist
