= Palazzo Castromediano-Limburg =

Renaissance palace in Apulia, Italy

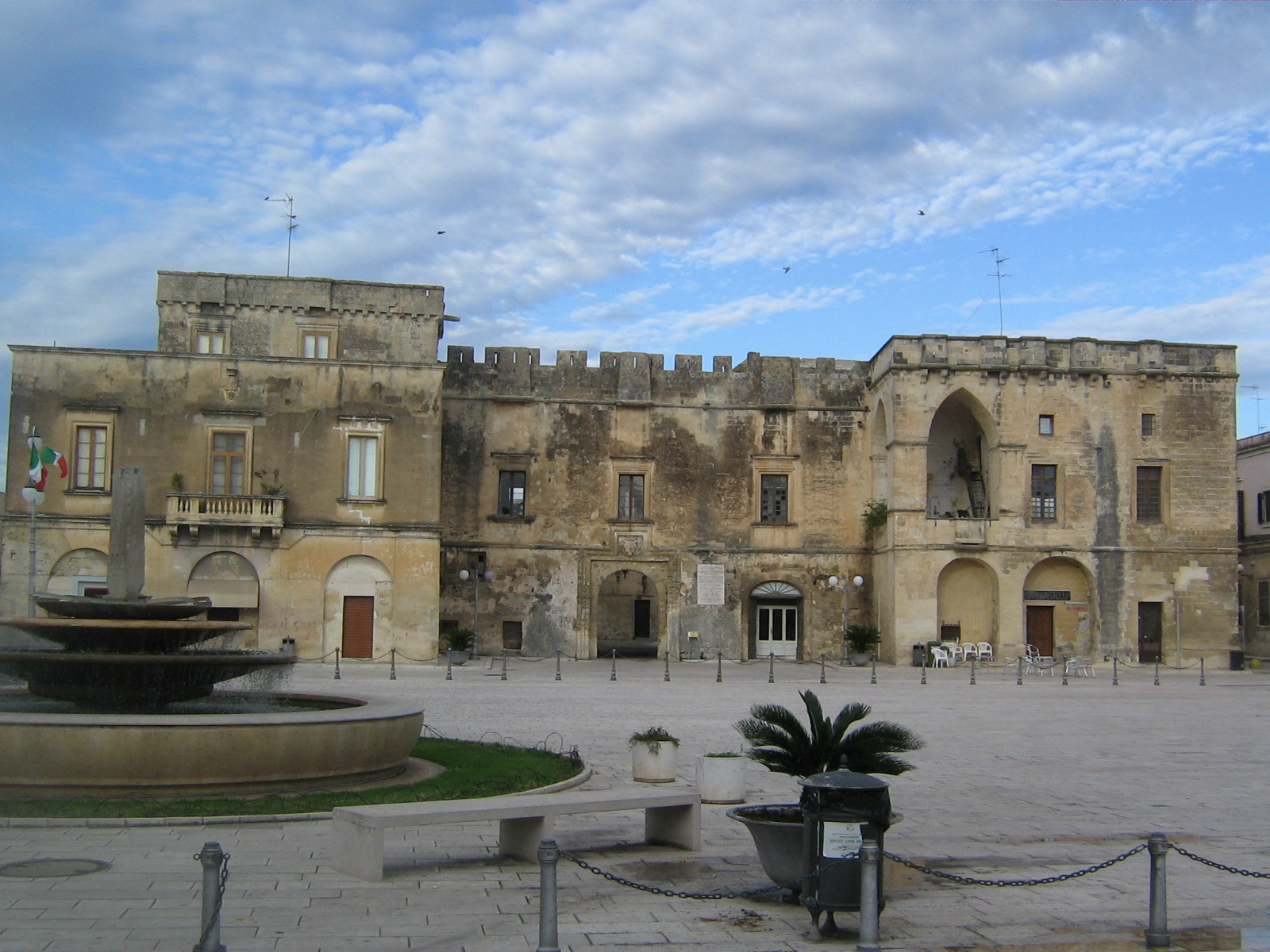
Castello Castromediano-Limburg

The Palazzo Castromediano-Limburg is an early-Renaissance-style palace, now museum, in the town of Cavallino, province of Lecce, Region of Apulia, Italy.

== History ==
The palace was built in the second half of the 16th century, but has undergone various subsequent reconstructions. It faces the central piazza of the town, and served as a fortress and residence for the master of the town.

Among the most notable pieces at the site is the colossal statue in the inner courtyard, locally called the giant, depicting in seventeenth-century clothes, Kiliano di Limburg, founder of the family who settled in Terra d 'Otranto as a 12th-century mercenary for William I of Sicily. The family owned the palace till the 20th century.

The interior is decorated in Baroque style with tiles and frescoes. The main room has vault frescoes depicting symbols of the Zodiac, and the walls have stone statuary. In 2015, the palace had on display weaponry belonging to the Gorgoni heirs of Castromediano. The palace has paintings by Oronzo Tiso and the chapel (1565) has paintings are by Gianserio Strafella.
