= Merine, Lizzanello =

Merine
- Frazione
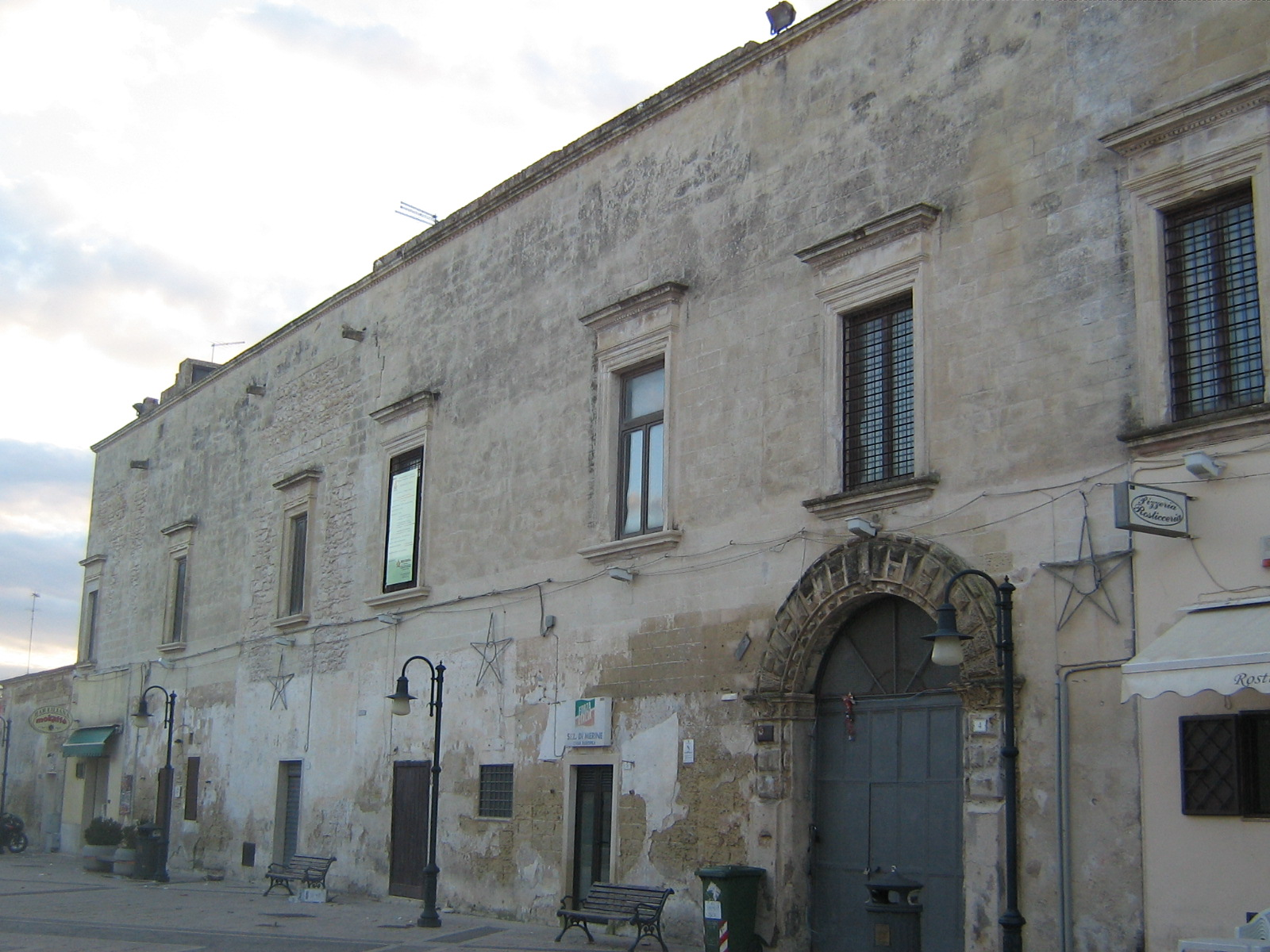
- Baronial palace Palmieri-Magliola

- Location of Merine in Italy
- Coordinates: 40°19′57″N 18°13′34″E
- Country: Italy
- Region: Apulia
- Province: Lecce (LE)
- Comune: Lizzanello
- Elevation: 45 m (148 ft)

Population (2011)
  - Total: 4,785
- Demonym: Merinesi
- Time zone: UTC+1 (CET)
  - Summer (DST): UTC+2 (CEST)
- Postal code: 73023
- Dialing code: (+39) 0832
- Patron saint: Assumption of Mary
- Saint day: 15 August

Merine is an Italian village and hamlet (frazione) of the municipality of Lizzanello in the Province of Lecce, Apulia. As of 2011 its population was of 4,785.

== History ==
Founded in the Middle Ages, it was part of the County of Lecce until the 13th century, when it became part of the fief of Carovineis. The village came under the control of Montenegro family and, in 1613, of the Palmieri. Urban and demographic growth, started in the last decades of the 20th century and early 21st, was due to its proximity to Lecce and its urban area. The population, 3,795 in 2001, increased by 1,000 in 10 years.

== Geography ==
Merine is located in the southeastern suburb of Lecce, 2 km from its beltway, 3 from the city and 10 from the Adriatic Coast. It is part of Salento and is 3 km from Lizzanello, 5 from Cavallino, 6 from Strudà and Pisignano, 9 from Vernole and 13 from Melendugno. Nearby the town there are the localities of Erchie Piccolo (pop. 65) and Marangi (pop. 112), both part of Merine.

== Gallery ==
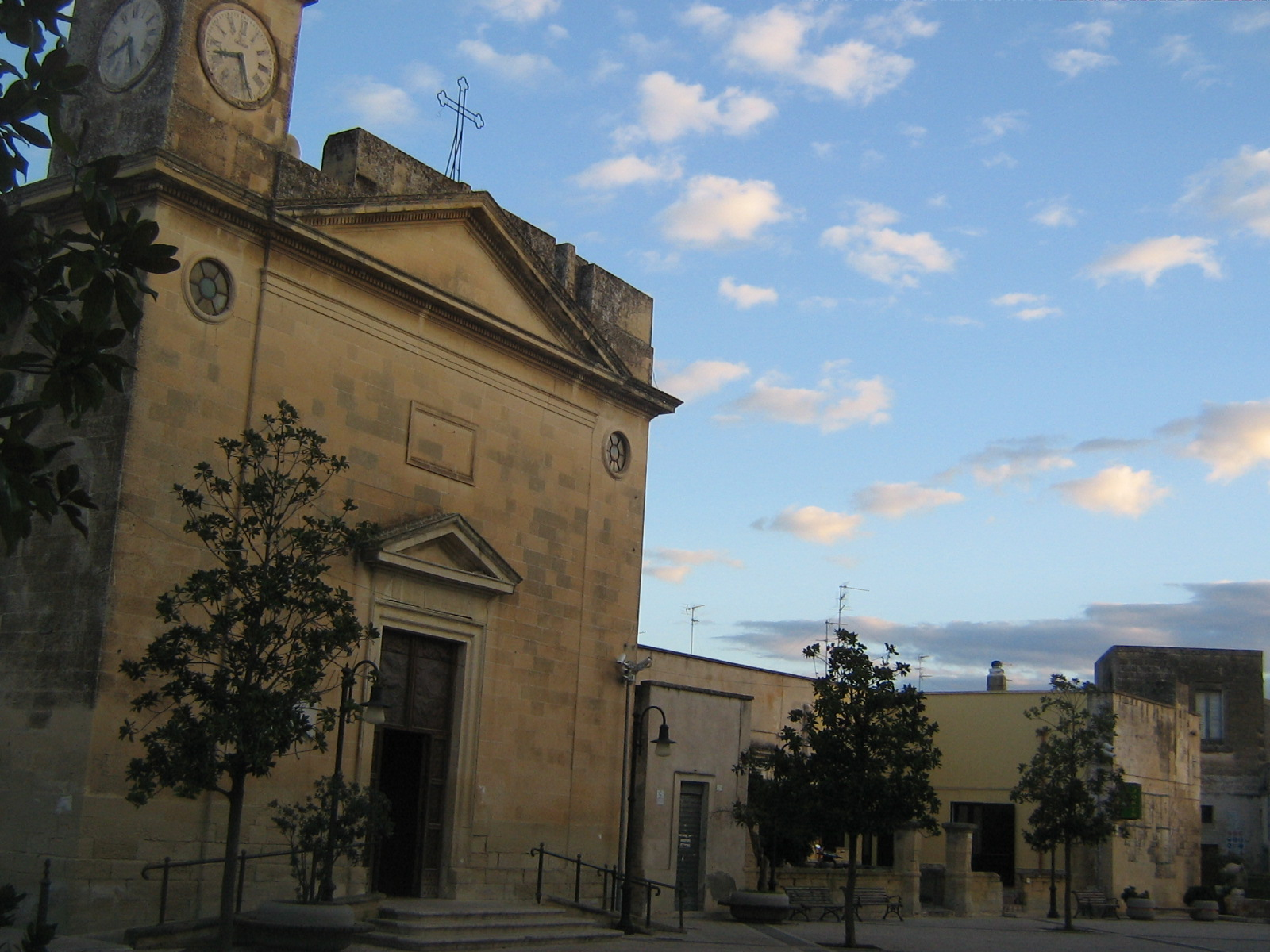
St. Mary's church

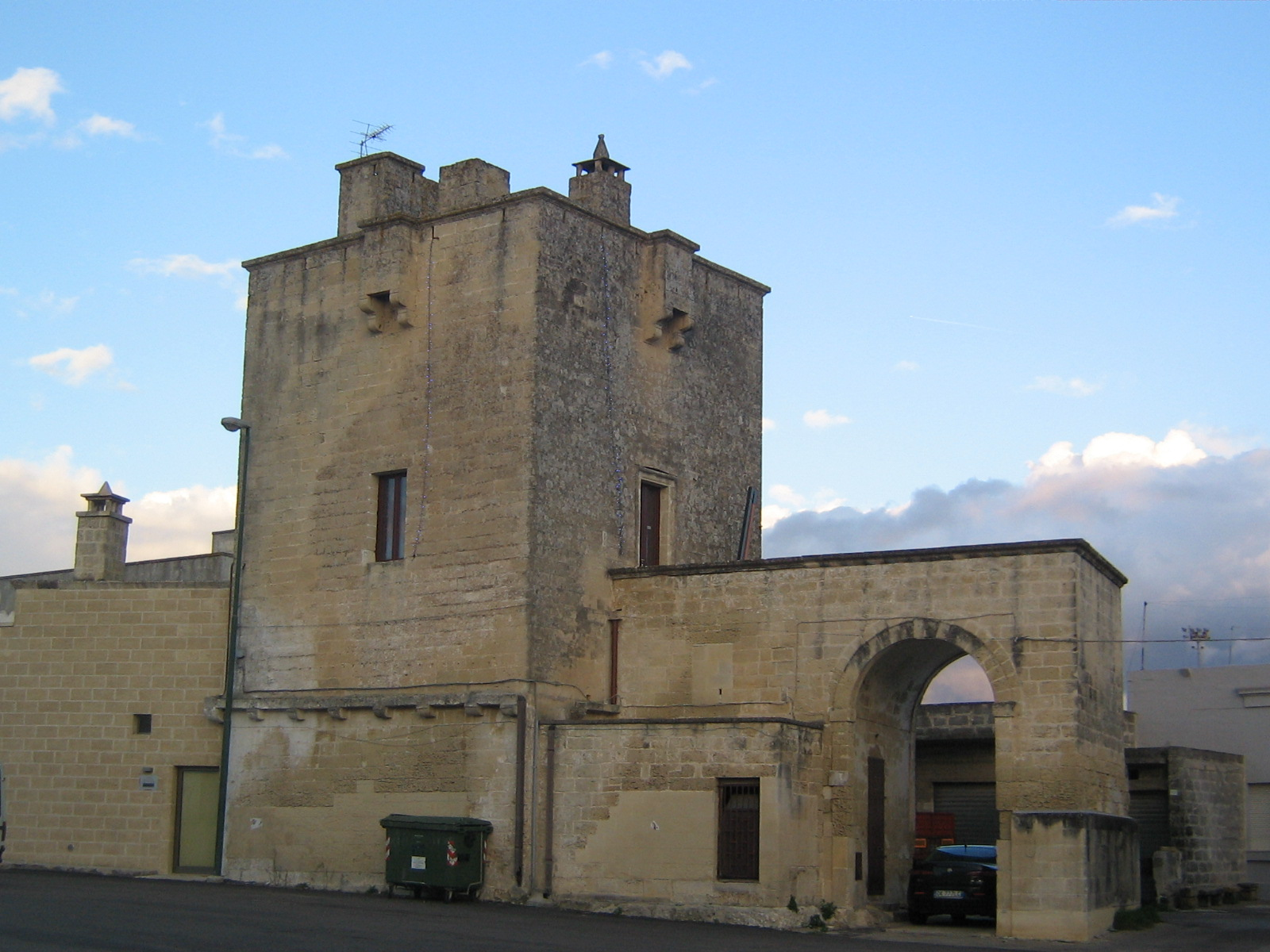
Fortified building

== Personalities ==
- Marco Bianco (1893-1983), general of Carabinieri
