= Capranica =

Capranica may refer to:

- House of Capranica, a noble Roman family; to this are related:
  - Teatro Capranica, a theatre in Rome originally built in 1679
  - Almo Collegio Capranica, a pontifical seminary in Rome for the training of priests
- Capranica Prenestina, a comune in the Metropolitan City of Rome, Italy
- Capranica, Lazio, a comune in the Province of Viterbo, Italy
- Caprarica di Lecce, town and comune in the Italian province of Lecce
