= Castri di Lecce =

Castri di Lecce, Italy
- Comune
- Comune di Castri di Lecce
- Location within Italy Location within Apulia
- Coordinates: 40°16′N 18°16′E
- Country: Italy
- Region: Apulia
- Province: Lecce
- Frazioni: Calimera, Caprarica di Lecce, Lizzanello, Vernole

Area
  - Total: 12 km^{2} (4.6 sq mi)
- Elevation: 47 m (154 ft)

Population (November 2008)
  - Total: 3,066
  - Density: 260/km^{2} (660/sq mi)
- Demonym: Castrisani
- Time zone: UTC+1 (CET)
  - Summer (DST): UTC+2 (CEST)
- Postal code: 73020
- Dialing code: 0832
- ISTAT code: 075017
- Patron saint: San Vito
- Saint day: 15 June
- Website: Official website

Castri di Lecce (Salentino: Casṭṛì; Griko: τα Καστρία translit. ta Kastrìa), is a town and comune in the Italian province of Lecce in the Apulia region of south-east Italy.
