= Master of Isabella di Chiaromonte =

Neapolitan manuscript illuminator (fl. 15th c.)

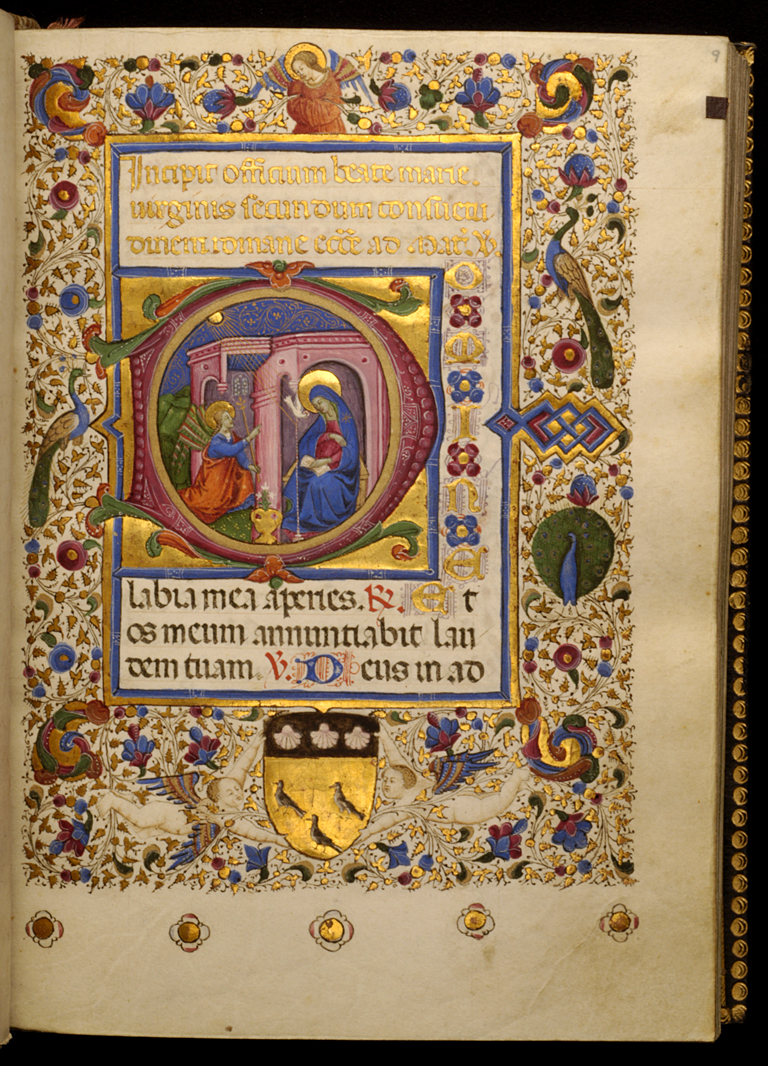
Book of hours (Walters W.328, 9r)

The Master of Isabella di Chiaromonte was a manuscript illuminator active in Naples between 1455 and 1469.

The anonymous master decorated the incipit page of a copy of the prophetic books of the Old Testament for Angilberto Del Balzo in 1466. It was confiscated by King Ferdinand I in the aftermath of the Conspiracy of the Barons (1485–1487) and is now Paris, Bibliothèque nationale de France, Italien 3. Morgan Library M. 389, a copy of the Phaenomena Aratea, was illustrated by the master for Antonello Petrucci, who was executed for his part in the rebellion in 1487.

The anonymous master decorated a pocket-sized miscellany for Roberto Sanseverino in 1467–1468, now Bibliothèque de Genève, Comites Latentes 269. He also decorated a copy of Augustine's The City of God that was later owned by Matteo Barresi and is now Lawrence, University of Kansas, Kenneth Spencer Research Library, MS G.1. Two books of hours decorated by the master are known. One is the work after which he is called, the book of hours of Isabella of Clermont, wife and queen of Ferdinand I. It is now Houghton Library, Harvard University, Typ. 463. The other book of hours is Walters Art Museum W.328.
