= Gianserio Strafella =

Italian painter

Gianserio Strafella (Copertino, ca. 1520–1573, according to some sources; 1506–1577, according to others) was an Italian Mannerist painter active mainly in Salento. His work may be seen in the chapel of Copertino Castle and the Basilica di Santa Croce in Lecce.

Strafella was an apprentice of Michelangelo, whose style and skill could not only match his teacher and Raphael, but also the ancient Greek painters Apelles and Zeuxis. Strafella learned from the works of Michelangelo to use perspective to better depict reality, he put this technique to full use in his paintings. The art critic Cosimo De Giorgi in 1882 defines him as "one of the few truly eminent painters of Terra di Otranto."
