= Cristina Conchiglia =

Italian trade unionist and politician

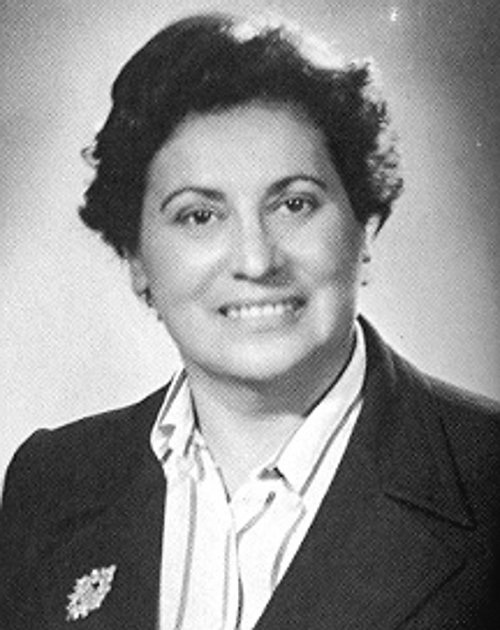
Cristina Conchiglia

Cristina Conchiglia, married name Calasso (Brindisi, 4 January 1923 - Lecce, 5 May 2013), was an Italian trade unionist, politician, and leader of the Italian General Confederation of Labour and the Italian Communist Party. She was Mayor Emeritus of Copertino and member of parliament from 1976 to 1983.

== Biography ==
Although Cristina Conchiglia was born in Brindisi, her life as a trade unionist began in Salento, where she arrived in 1950 as a result of her marriage to the then Member of Parliament, Giuseppe Calasso (1899-1983), who was active with the farmers of Arneo. She was a leading figure in the struggles to secure the rights of women tobacco workers in Salento, who were forced to work under inadequate conditions and wages. In the early 1950s, she was arrested in Lecce for leading a tobacco strike and founded the Italian tobacco workers' union. Together with her husband Giuseppe, she participated in the land occupation in Arneo.

Cristina Conchiglia was a member of the Italian Parliament during the two legislatures VII and VIII, from 5 July 1976 to 11 July 1983. She was elected for the constituency of Lecce and belonged to the Communist group. From 13 June 1981 to 11 July 1983, she was Secretary of the Parliamentary Committee for the advice to the Government on legislation concerning customs duties.

She died on 5 May 2013 at the age of 90 at her home in Lecce.
