= Acaya =

Coordinates: 40°20′N 18°18′E

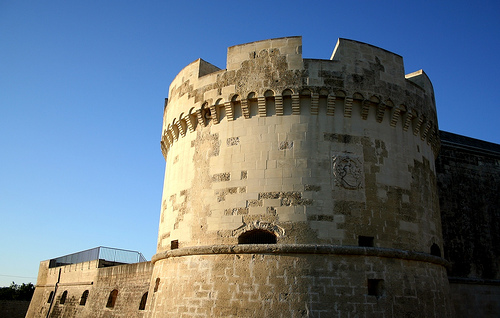
A view of the castle.

Acaya is a small village, a community, in the province of Lecce and region of Apulia, in southern Italy.

== Description ==
The heart of the settlement is a good example of the few fortified villages left in Apulia, and its layout was planned to optimize defense and survival capabilities. The street pattern dates back at least to the 16th century and divides the village into rectangular insulae, or islands. The centre consists of six streets laid out in a regular pattern, parallel with each other and running roughly from north to south, all with a width of four meters, all but one some seventeen meters apart, and almost all having the same length. From east to west, three streets run at right-angles to the six north–south streets, one each at their south and north ends and one across the middle, making all of the streets orthogonal. The important buildings, such as the castle and the church, are built outside this grid of streets, the castle standing a little way off to the south-west.

The village lies some five kilometers from the Adriatic Sea and the Cesine public nature reserve (Riserva naturale statale Le Cesine).

== Main sights ==
- Castle built by Gian Giacomo of Acaya in 1535–1536. The trapezoidal Renaissance fortress, is a trace of the Aragonese period.
- Fortified citadel
- Church of Santa Maria della Neve
- Chapel of San Paolo constructed in the 18th century.

== Modern buildings ==
- Double Tree built a five star resort which includes an 18-hole golf club.
