= Tristan of Clermont =

French-born knight

Bartholomew "Tristan" de Clermont-Lodève (1380 – c. 1432), Count of Copertino, was a French-born knight who married Catherine Orsini del Balzo, youngest daughter of Mary of Enghien and Raimondo Orsini del Balzo, Prince of Taranto. He was the father of Isabella of Clermont, Princess of Taranto, the first consort of King Ferdinand I of Naples.

Documents and sources about Tristan, whose proper first name was Bartholomew, are scarce. Tristan de Clermont (Italian: Tristano di Chiaromonte) became Count of Cupertino by his wife's dowry.

In 1429 Tristan divided the inheritance between his children. They were:

- Raymond de Clermont (Raimondello di Chiaromonte), died on 2 March 1443, leaving his inheritance to his sister Sancia;
- Sancia, who married Francesco del Balzo, Duke of Andria
- Margherita, who married Antonio Ventimiglia, Marquess of Geraci, Grand Admiral;
- Antonia, alleged somewhere to have married Thomas Palaeologus, titular Despot of Morea, as brother of Emperor Constantine and heir presumptive to the throne of the Byzantine Empire;
- Isabella, who married Ferdinand of Aragon, later King of Naples

== Sources ==
- Petracca, Luciana (2022). Le terre dei baroni ribelli: Poteri feudali e rendita signorile nel Mezzogiorno aragonese. Viella libreria editrice.
- Williams, George L. (1998). Papal Genealogy: The Families and Descendants of the Popes. McFarland & Company, Inc.
