= Catherine of Taranto, Countess of Copertino =

Italian noblewoman

Caterina d'Enghien Orsini
- Noble family: Orsini
- Spouse: Tristan, Count of Copertino
- Issue: Isabella of Clermont
- Father: Raimondo del Balzo Orsini
- Mother: Mary of Enghien

Catherine of Taranto (d. 1429; sometimes Caterina d'Enghien Orsini del Balzo) was the daughter of Mary of Enghien and Raimondo Orsini del Balzo di Nola and sister of Giovanni Antonio Orsini del Balzo.

Her early life was tumultuous; her father Raimondo died in 1406 (by some accounts executed). Raimondo, encouraged by Pope Innocent VII, had attempted to rebel against the king of Naples, King Ladislaus, and soon thereafter died. Caterina's mother continued to fight, and for months held Taranto against Ladislaus. However, Ladislaus prevailed, and forced Mary to marry him, by imprisoning her and her children (including Caterina) until she submitted to the marriage.

In 1415, Caterina married the knight Tristan de Clermont (1380 – c. 1432), a member of the French family of Clermont-Lodève, who became Count of Copertino as part of her dowry.

She and Tristan had two daughters:

- Isabella of Clermont (c. 1424 – 30 March 1465), who became Queen of Naples and Jerusalem by marriage to Ferdinand I of Naples, the only, albeit illegitimate, son of King Alfonso V of Aragon.
- Sancia di Chiaromonte (died 30 March 1468), Countess of Copertino and Lady of Nardò. In 1436 she married Francesco II del Balzo (1410–1482), 3rd Duke of Andria, who became Count of Copertino as part of her dowry.
