= Evangelista Menga =

Italian military engineer

Evangelista Menga (c. 1480 – c. 1571) was an Italian military engineer.

He was from Francavilla Fontana. As the military architect of Emperor Charles V, he designed the Castello di Copertino, the Castle of Barletta, the Castello di Mola di Bari, the Castello di Parabita and the defensive tower of Margherita di Savoia. He was the resident engineer of the Order of St. John from 1560 to 1567, and he was involved in repairing the fortifications of Malta during the Great Siege of 1565.

He married Maria Coco, and they had one son, Avolio. From him four children were born: Sigismondo, Porzia, Camilla and Laura. Sigismondo married Ottavia Calefato in Francavilla, and Porzia married Angelo Perruccio di Leverano

Menga received the honorific title of a knight due to his service to the Order, and he received an annuity of 300 scudi every year. He died in around 1571, aged about ninety, probably in Malta.
