= Raimondo Orsini del Balzo =

Italian nobleman

- Tenure: 1382-1406
- Predecessor: Nicola Orsini
- Successor: Giovanni Antonio Orsini del Balzo and Catherine of Taranto, Countess of Copertino
- Born: 1350–55; Taranto
- Died: 17 January 1406; Taranto
- Buried: Cathedral of Taranto [lost]
- Noble family: Orsini
- Spouse: Mary of Enghien
- Issue: Giovanni Antonio Orsini del Balzo; Catherine of Taranto, Countess of Copertino; Gabriele
- Father: Nicola Orsini
- Mother: Giovanna di Sabran

Raimondo Orsini del Balzo (also known as Raimondello; (Note: Historical sources very rarely call him by this name.) c. 1350–55 – 17 January 1406) was a nobleman from the Kingdom of Naples. He was Count of Soleto (1382), Prince of Taranto (1399–1406), Duke of Bari, Grand Constable of the Kingdom of Naples, Gonfalonier of the Holy Roman Church (1385, confirmed in 1399 together with the principality of Taranto). He was a member of the influential Orsini family of Rome. Although he is considered one of the most important people in the history of southern Italy, relatively little is known about his life.

== Biography ==
Raimondo was born in Taranto, the second son of Nicola Orsini (1331–1399), 3rd Count of Nola, grand Justiciar and also Grand Chancellor of the Kingdom of Naples, and his wife Giovanna of Sabran. His paternal grandparents were Roberto Orsini di Nola (1295–1345), 2nd Count of Nola, Grand Justiciar of Naples, and the heiress Sveva Del Balzo (born in the first years of 14th century), Countess of Soleto, heiress of des Baux. The family is later known as Orsini del Balzo.

Nothing is known of his childhood and early youth, and the first mention of him dates to February 1372, describing him as a squire in the Avignon Papacy. Sveva Del Balzo died in 1375, bequeathing Soleto to Nicola on the condition that he give it to Raimondo, who would then take on the Del Balzo name. However, Nicola instead gave it to his eldest son Roberto. This forced Raimondo to seek his fortune elsewhere. According to legend, he went on a pilgrimage to the Middle East, though there is no documentary evidence of that. It is known that in February 1378, he arrived in Prussia and participated in the Galicia–Volhynia Wars, during which time he was made a knight of the Teutonic Order.

He returned to Italy in 1381, getting involved in the dispute between Louis I, Duke of Anjou, and Charles of Durazzo over which of them would succeed Joanna I of Naples after she was excommunicated for supporting Antipope Clement VII. At first he supported Louis, but switched his allegiance to Charles in 1382. In September 1384, he returned to the ranks of Louis, who died shortly afterwards, meaning that Charles became King of Naples. His reign was short-lived, however, as he too was excommunicated by Pope Urban VI. Charles retaliated by besieging the pope at Nocera, but in July 1385 Raimondo freed the pope.

Soon after this incident, Raimondo married Mary of Enghien, the Countess of Lecce. This came about because Louis, Count of Enghien (Mary's uncle) was (like Raimondo) a trusted advisor of both Louis I and his son Louis II (Louis II later became King of Naples). His position as Mary's husband and thus the dominus of the County of Lecce allowed him to reclaim Soleto from his brother, officially becoming the Count upon his father's death in 1399. Additionally, over the years, he received numerous possessions and titles, many in the Terra di Otranto region.

Meanwhile, Charles's son Ladislaus returned to reconquer Naples. Despite his many years of service to Louis's family, Raimondo knew he was allied with the losing side, and switched allegiances once more on the promise that he would be given the Principality of Taranto, which happened in April 1399. However, by 1405, Ladislaus came into conflict with Pope Innocent VII, whom he had previously supported on the condition that the pope not challenge his claim to the throne. Innocent excommunicated Ladislaus, but offered to pardon any of Louis II's supporters who came to his side, which Raimondo did, but he died soon afterwards on 17 January 1406, before Ladislaus had even learned of Raimondo's betrayal.

Raimondo is buried at the church of Santa Caterina d'Alessandria in Galatina, which he had commissioned, together with his son and heir Giovanni Antonio.

Despite having been one of the most important people in the history of southern Italy, there has been little scholarship done on Raimondo's life. One reason for this is that there are only six surviving documents from his years in the government of the Kingdom of Naples. This is likely due to his being declared a nonperson by Ladislaus, resulting in the destruction of many sources that would give insight into his life.

== List of titles ==
- Prince of Taranto
- Count of Soleto
- Dominus of the Counties of Lecce and Veglie
- Baron of Acerra, Altamura, Lavello, Locorotondo, Minervino, Trevico, and Tricase
- Duke of Bari
- Gonfalonier of the Church
- Chamberlain of the King of Naples
- Captain general of the Terra di Otranto
- Member of the Order of the Ship
- Member of the Teutonic Order

In addition to the above, he was lord (both de facto and de jure) of a number of other localities. He was said to be the second-most powerful and possibly the richest man in the Kingdom of Naples.

== Family ==
Raimondello and Mary had the following children:

- Giovanni Antonio (1386–1463), Prince of Taranto, Duke of Bari, Count of Lecce, Acerra, Soleto, Conversano, also 1443 count of Matera, 1453 Ugento.
- Maria del Balzo Orsini, married Antonio Acquaviva, 2nd Duke of Atri. Apparently childless.
- Caterina del Balzo Orsini, married Bartolomeo (also known as Tristano) di Chiaramonte (de Clermont), Count of Copertino (1380 - c. 1432)
- Gabriele (died 1453), Count of Ugento 1434, 1st Duke of Venosa 1441, Count of Lecce, Neapolitan General and Admiral. Married 1431 Giovanna (Ippolita) Caracciolo del Sole dei Duchi di Melfi, daughter of Sergianni Caracciolo dei Duchi di Melfi, Grand Seneschal of Kingdom of Sicily, and his wife Caterina Filangieri.

== Notes ==
Raimondo Orsini del Balzo Orsini family Born: 1361 Died: 17 January 1406
Preceded by Otto, Duke of Brunswick-Grubenhagen	25th Prince of Taranto; 1393–1406	Succeeded by Ladislaus of Durazzo
Preceded by Mary of Enghien	Count of Lecce; 1393–1406	Succeeded by Ladislaus of Durazzo
