= Isabella of Clermont =

Queen of Naples from 1458 to 1465

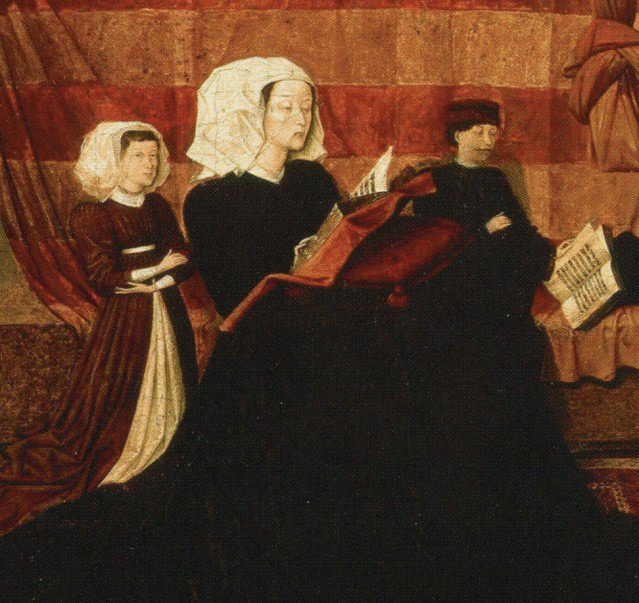

Queen consort of Naples
- Tenure: 27 June 1458 – 30 March 1465
- Born: c. 1424; Taranto, Principality of Taranto, Kingdom of Naples
- Died: 30 March 1465 (aged 40–41); Naples, Kingdom of Naples
- Burial: San Pietro Martire
- Spouse: Ferdinand I of Naples
- Issue among others...: Alfonso II, King of Naples; Eleanor, Duchess of Bari and Ferrara; Frederick IV, King of Naples; Cardinal John; Beatrice, Queen of Hungary and Bohemia
- Father: Tristan of Clermont
- Mother: Catherine of Taranto

A page from Isabella's book of hours, painted by the Master of Isabella di Chiaromonte

Isabella of Clermont (c. 1424 – 30 March 1465), also known as Isabella of Taranto, was Queen of Naples as the first wife of King Ferdinand I of Naples, and a feudatory of the kingdom as the holder and ruling Princess of the Principality of Taranto in 1463–1465.

== Life ==
Born on January 1424 in Copertino (in southern Apulia), Isabella was the elder daughter of Tristan de Clermont, Count of Copertino, and Caterina Orsini Del Balzo. She was also the niece and heir of childless Giovanni Antonio Orsini del Balzo, Prince of Taranto. Her maternal grandmother, Mary of Enghien, was queen consort of Naples from 1406 until 1414.

On 30 May 1444/1445, Isabella married Ferdinand of Aragon, then Duke of Calabria (1423–1494), natural son of Alfonso V of Aragon who had recently conquered the Neapolitan kingdom from French Angevins, and thus was the new liege lord of Isabella and her family. Alfonso arranged this marriage in order to give a good future to his favorite bastard son, by giving him his own principality by marriage. Also, Alfonso wanted his loyal people (such as his own son) to have feudal fiefs in his new kingdom, which would happen in the future as soon as Ferdinand and Isabella succeeded in Taranto. The marriage also strengthened the king's grip on the current lords of Taranto.

On 27 June 1458 Isabella's husband became, by the will of his father, king of Naples. Isabella became queen. They no longer wanted to make Taranto their principal holding, but it was still a strong possession, and in 1463 Isabella succeeded her uncle Giovanni Antonio as princess of Taranto.

Queen Isabella died on 30 March 1465, and was buried in San Pietro Martire. Her heir was her eldest son, the future King Alfonso II of Naples.

== Issue ==
Isabella and Ferdinand had:

- Alfonso II of Naples (4 November 1448 – 18 December 1495)
- Eleanor of Naples (22 June 1450 – 11 October 1493), duchess of Bari and Ferrara
- Frederick IV of Naples (19 April 1452 – 9 November 1504), married Isabella del Balzo
- John of Naples (25 June 1456 – 17 October 1485), archbishop of Taranto and then cardinal
- Beatrice of Naples (14 September/16 November 1457 – 23 September 1508), queen of Hungary
- Francis of Naples, Duke of Sant'Angelo (16 December 1461 – 26 October 1486)

== Sources ==
- Commire, Anne; Klezmer, Deborah, eds. (1999). "Leonora of Aragon (1450-1493)". Women in World History: A Biographical Encyclopedia. Vol. 9:Laa-Lyud. Yorkin.
- Williams, George L. (1998). Papal Genealogy: The Families and Descendants of the Popes. McFarland & Company, Inc.

Royal titles
Preceded by Maria of Castile	Queen consort of Naples; 27 June 1458 – 30 March 1465	Succeeded by Joanna of Aragon
Regnal titles
Preceded by Giovanni Antonio del Balzo Orsini	Princess of Taranto; 1463–1465	Succeeded by Alphonso II of Naples
