= Caprarica di Lecce =

Caprarica di Lecce Griko: Krapàreka
- Comune
- Comune di Caprarica di Lecce
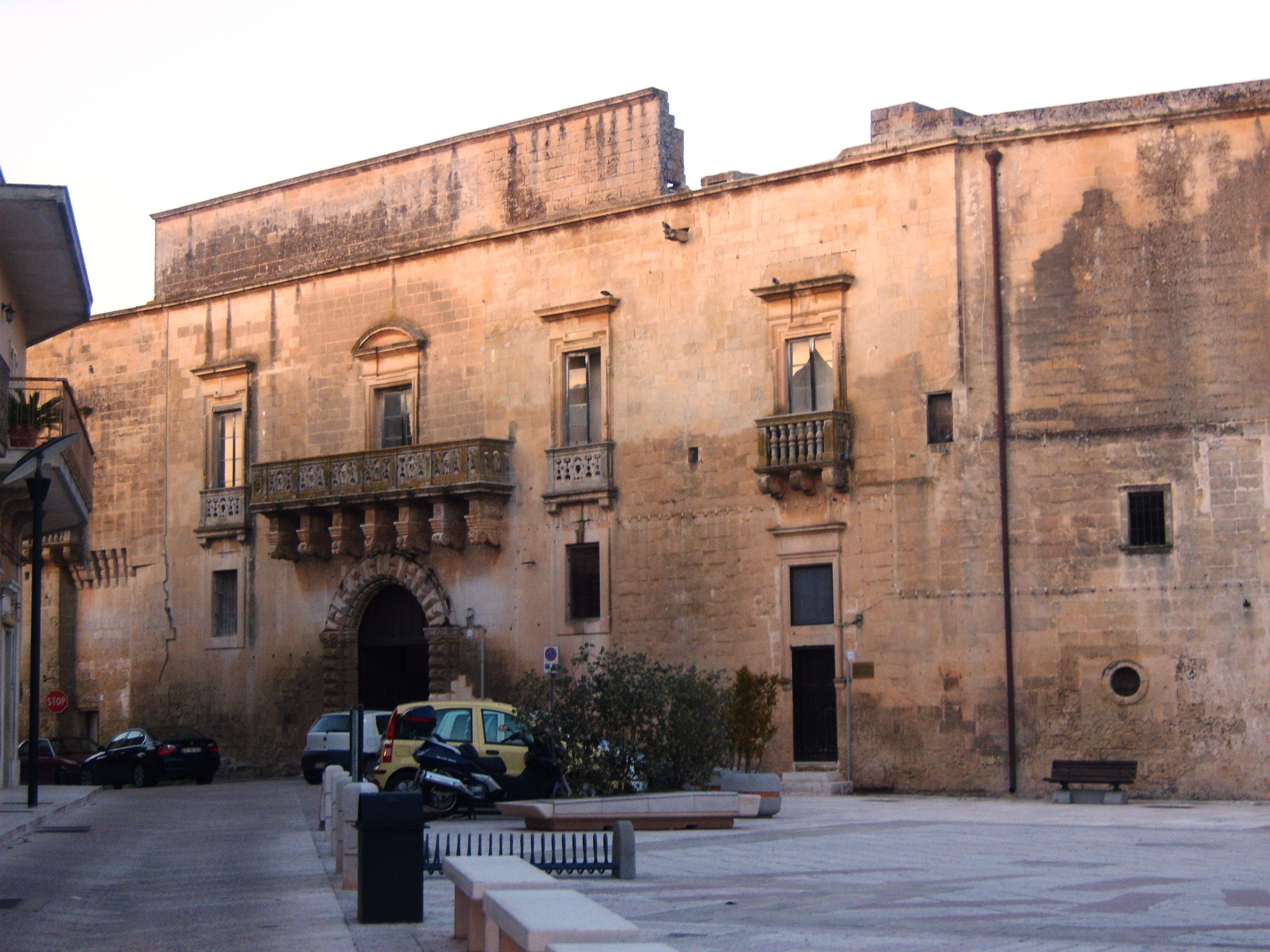
- Victory Square at Caprarica

- Location within Italy Location within Apulia
- Coordinates: 40°16′N 18°15′E
- Country: Italy
- Region: Apulia
- Province: Lecce (LE)
- Frazioni: Calimera, Castri di Lecce, Cavallino, Lizzanello, Martignano, San Donato di Lecce, Sternatia

Area
  - Total: 10 km^{2} (3.9 sq mi)
- Elevation: 60 m (200 ft)

Population (November 2008)
  - Total: 2,609
  - Density: 260/km^{2} (680/sq mi)
- Demonym: Capraresi
- Time zone: UTC+1 (CET)
  - Summer (DST): UTC+2 (CEST)
- Postal code: 73010
- Dialing code: 0832
- ISTAT code: 075013
- Patron saint: Saints Nicola and Oronzo
- Website: Official website

Caprarica di Lecce (Salentino: Crapàrica; Griko: Κραπάρεκα, Krapàreka) is a town and comune in the Italian province of Lecce. It is located in the Apulia region of south-east Italy.

Antonio Verri (1949–1993) was a poet and writer who was born in the town.
