= Nicola Orsini, Count of Nola =

Roman nobleman and man of letters

Nicola Orsini (1331–1399) was a Roman nobleman and man of letters who served the Holy See and the Kingdom of Naples.

Nicola was probably born in 1331. His father was Roberto di Romano of the Orsini family and his mother Sveva del Balzo of the del Balzo family. From his father he inherited the counties of Nola and Soleto in the Kingdom of Naples; half of the county held by the Aldobrandeschi in Tuscany with the title of count palatine; and numerous properties in and around Rome. Politically, he continued his family's alliance with the Angevin dynasty of Naples and the pro-papal Guelphs.

In 1356, Nicola served a term as senator of Rome. From 1359 to 1361, he served as viceroy of the Abruzzo. In 1359, he defeated the Great Company under Konrad von Landau when it invaded the Abruzzo. In February 1363, Queen Joanna I sent him to Avignon to remit taxes owed to the papacy. At the same time, he requested and received papal intervention to resolve a dispute between him and the queen. In 1371, he was one of eight heads of the Orsini family that met in Rome to discuss matters affecting the family, including the rise of the Felice società dei balestrieri e dei pavesati, a Roman militia. In 1383, Nicola was the procurator of King Charles III.

A pious and cultured man, Nicola was friends with Coluccio Salutati and Giovanni Boccaccio. In 1361, he attended a meeting in the garden of Barbato da Sulmona with Niccolò Acciaiuoli and other literati to urge Petrarch to publish his poem Africa. In 1368, Salutati praised his Declamationes as equal in its latinity to the classics. In 1365, Nicola was named Gonfalonier of the Church. Both Urban V (1362–1370) and Gregory XI (1370–1378) appointed him rector of the Patrimony of Saint Peter in Tuscany. Nicola extensively renovated the basilica of Santa Croce in Gerusalemme and, in 1370, introduced a Carthusian convent into the building. Between 1370 and 1395, he rebuilt the cathedral of Nola in the Gothic style. It was later rebuilt, but a description (ekphrasis) of the Gothic work is found in Ambrogio Leone's De Nola from 1514.

The name of Nicola's wife is unknown. The couple had one son, Roberto, who died in 1393. Nicola died in 1399. He was originally buried in a monumental tomb in the Franciscan convent in Nola, which he had renovated. Today only his heavily damaged sarcophagus remains.
