= Giovanni Antonio Orsini del Balzo =

Italian nobleman (1401–1463)

- Grand Constable of the Kingdom of Naples
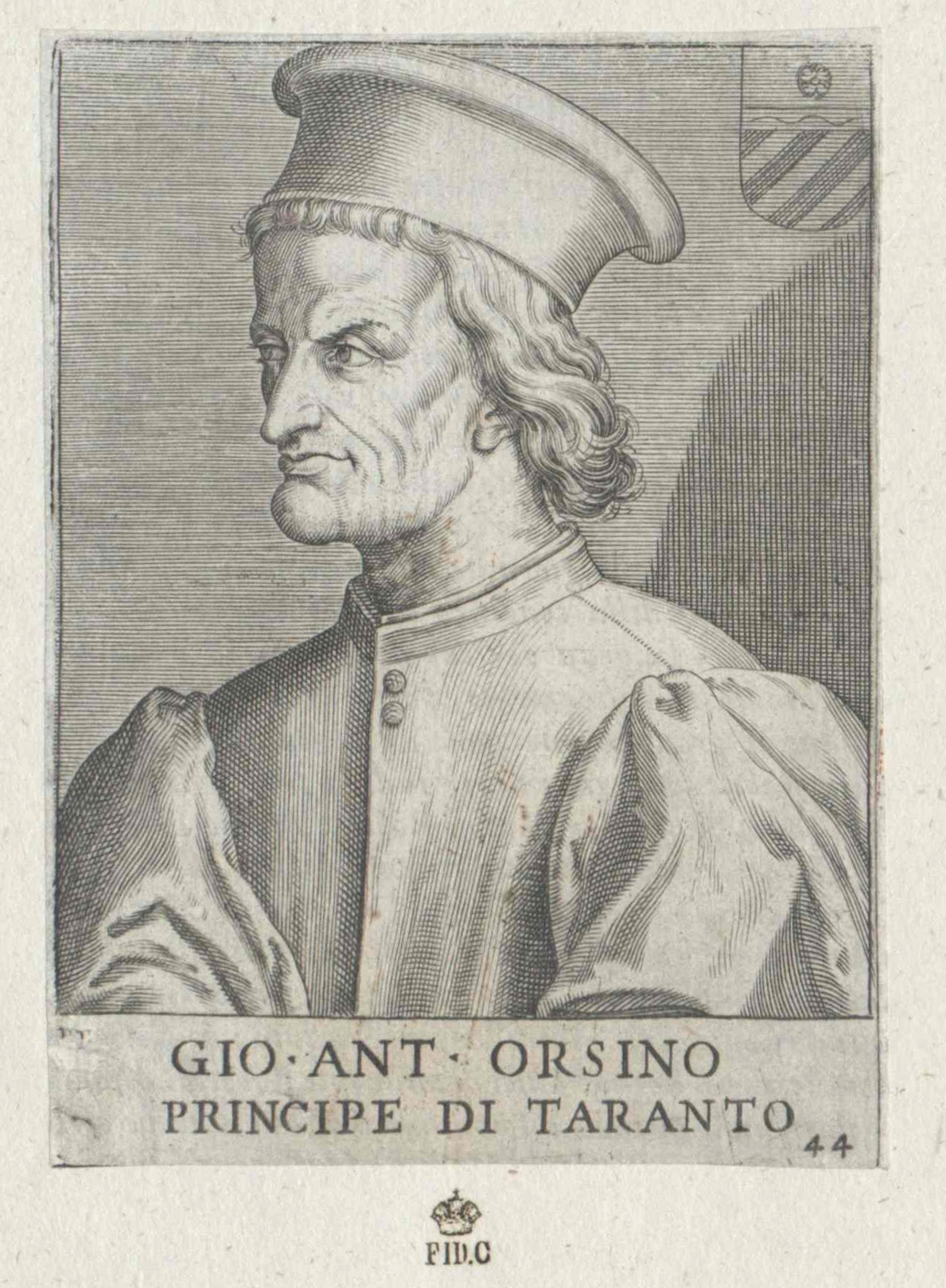
- Portrait
- Other titles: Prince of Taranto, Duke of Bari, Count of Lecce, Acerra, Soleto and Conversano, as well as Count of Matera (1433–63) and of Ugento (1453–63)
- Born: 1386 or 1393
- Died: 15 November 1463
- Noble family: Orsini
- Spouse: Anna Colonna
- Father: Raimondo Orsini del Balzo, Prince of Taranto
- Mother: Mary of Enghien

Giovanni Antonio (Giannantonio) Orsini del Balzo (9 September 1401 – 15 November 1463) was a southern Italian nobleman and military leader; he was Prince of Taranto, Duke of Bari, Count of Lecce, Acerra, Soleto and Conversano, as well as Count of Matera (1433–63) and of Ugento (1453–63).

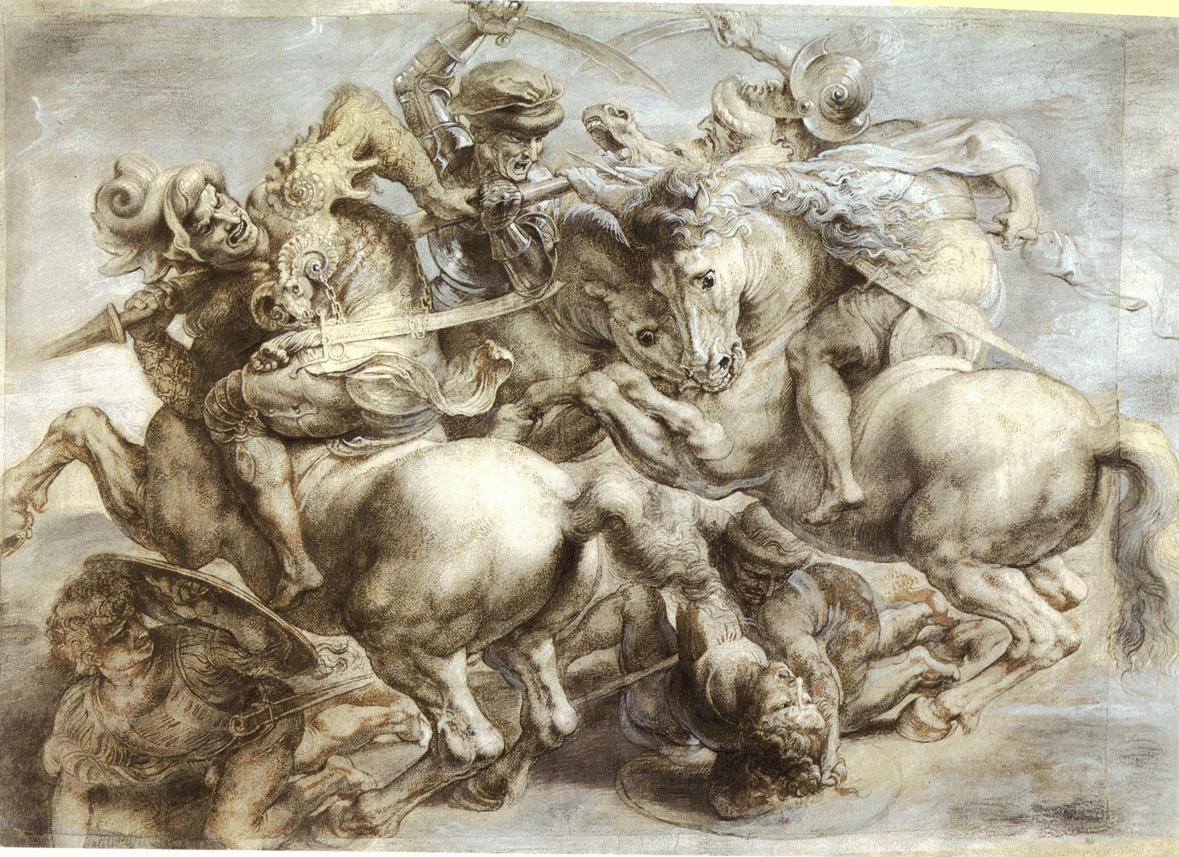
Peter Paul Rubens's copy of The Battle of Anghiari by Leonardo da Vinci. Allegedly the two knights at right are Ludovico Trevisan and Giovanni Orsini.

== Biography ==
Born in Lecce, he was the son of Raimondo Orsini del Balzo, Prince of Taranto, and Mary of Enghien, an heiress of the Brienne main branch. When his father died, he was one year old, and his mother married King Ladislaus of Naples, who acquired all the family's possessions (1407).

In 1417 Giannantonio married Pope Martin V's niece Anna Colonna, daughter of the Prince of Amalfi. After James II's abdication, he received the Principality of Taranto from queen Joanna II of Naples on 4 May 1421. This act made him the most powerful baronial lord of the Kingdom of Naples, with lands including 7 archbishoprics, 30 bishoprics, 300 castles and extending from Salerno to Taranto.

Coat of arms of the Orsini del Balzo family

Giannantonio was also an influential member of the Neapolitan court, and remained engulfed in the struggle between Joanna and Alfonso V of Aragon, whom he supported in the civil war against John II of Anjou. When Alfonso became king of Naples, Giannantonio further increased his power with the titles of Grand Constable and of Duke of Bari.

However, when Alfonso died, he retreated to Taranto to head a group of barons against the former's son, Ferdinand I, in favour of John II. After several feats of war, Giannantonio and his side were defeated, but in the end, he managed to become reconciled with the Aragonese king. He died in Altamura Castle in 1463, strangled by a certain Paolo Tricarico, perhaps a royal killer. King Ferdinand confiscated most of his lands. His niece Isabella, the legitimate heiress of Giannantonio's lands, died soon afterwards in 1465. Her heir was her eldest son, the future Alfonso II of Naples.

== Illegitimate children ==
- Caterina, Countess of Conversano, Signora di Casamassima e Turi. Married Giuliantonio Acquaviva d'Aragona, 7th Duke of Atri, 1456.
- Maria Conquesta (died after 1487), Countess of Ugento, Signora di Nardò e Castro from 1463. Married Angilberto Del Balzo, Count of Tricase and 1st Duke of Nardo circa 1463.
- Margherita, married Antonio Centelles, Count of Catanzaro and Justiciar of Calabria.
- Francesca, married Jacopo Sanseverino, Count of Saponara.
- Bertoldo (died after 1488), Baron of Salice. Some issue. Count of Lecce 1463–64.
- Another illegitimate daughter (name unknown), married Giacomo di Sanseverino, Count of Mileto. Apparently that marriage did not produce any surviving children.

== See also ==
- History of Francavilla Fontana

== Bibliography ==
- Berloco, Tommaso (1985). Storie inedite della città di Altamura (in Italian). ATA - Associazione Turistica Altamurana Pro Loco.

Preceded by James II, Count of La Marche	Prince of Taranto; 1420–1463	Succeeded by Isabella of Clermont
Preceded by Mary of Enghien	Count of Lecce; 1446–1463	Annexed to Kingdom of Naples
