= Phaenomena Aratea =

Phaenomena Aratea may refer to:

- the poem Phaenomena by Aratus (3rd century BC)

based on the above:

- the translation of Cicero (1st century BC)
- the translation of Avienius (4th century AD)
- a work by Germanicus (1st century BC or 1st century AD)
  - the Leiden Aratea manuscript
- the Carolingian De ordine ac positione stellarum in signis
