= Cesine =

Nature reserve in southern Italy

Le Cesine
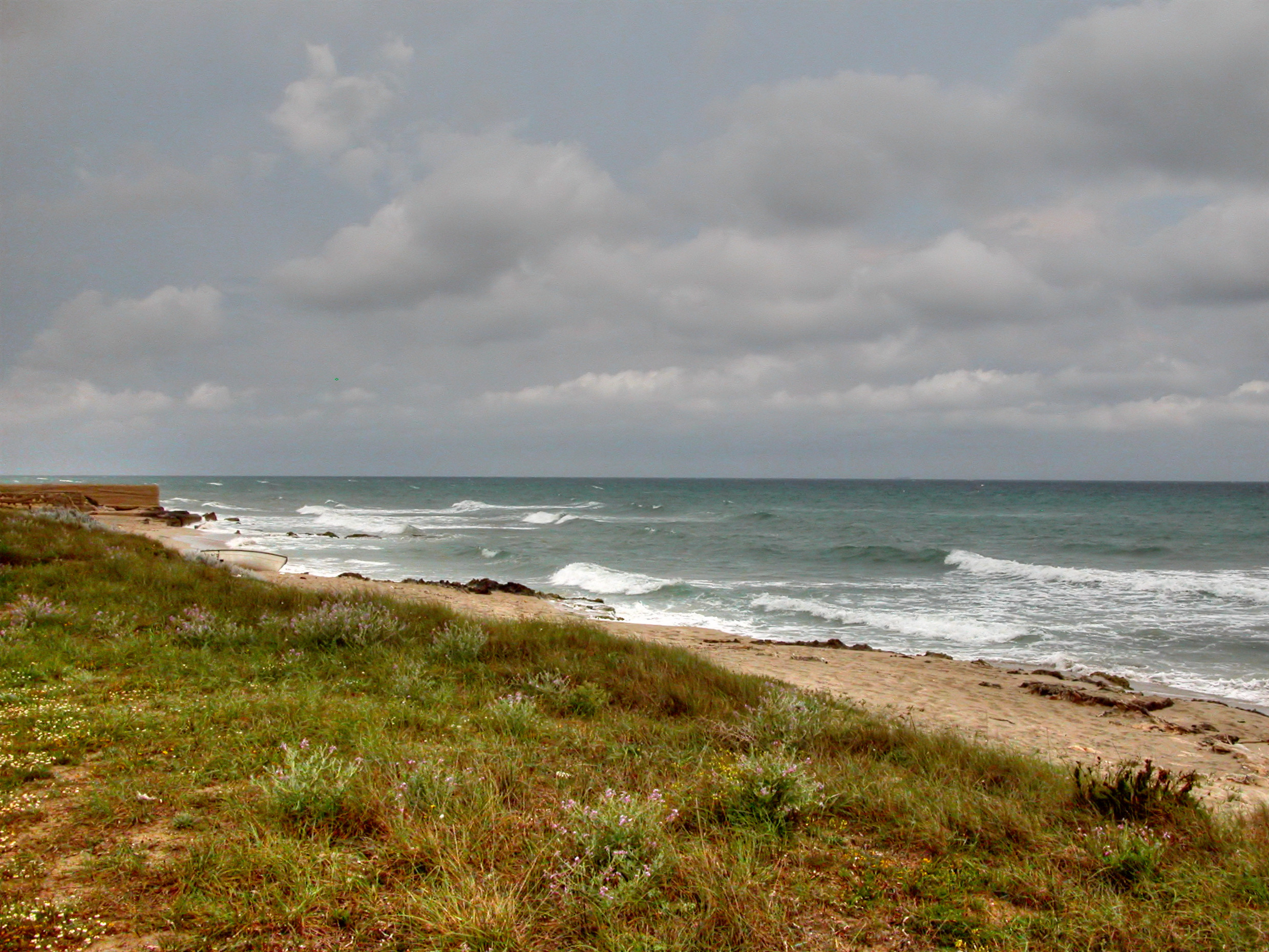
- Interactive map of Le Cesine
- Location: Italy
- Coordinates: 40°21′08″N 18°20′19″E
- Website: Official website

Ramsar Wetland
- Official name: Le Cesine
- Designated: 6 December 1977
- Reference no.: 168

Le Cesine is a wetland and natural state reserve extending for 380 hectares near Lecce, in southern Italy. It has been recognized as one of the Ramsar wetland sites of international importance in 1977, and a state nature reserve and a special protection area – SPA (Birds Directive) in 1980. The management of the oasis has been entrusted to WWF Italy by the Ministry of the Environment and has been managed by WWF since 1979.

== Biology and ecology ==
The park represents one of the last swampy areas that in the past extended from Otranto to Brindisi. There are two ponds, the Salapi and Pantano Grande, fed by the rains, which are separated from the sea by a cord of sand dunes. It is managed by the WWF Italy.

=== Fauna ===
Numerous birds find refuge in the nature reserve: pochard (Aythya ferina), coot (Fulica), marsh harrier (Circus aeruginosus), red-crested pochard (Netta rufina), little grebe (Tachybaptus ruficollis), cormorant (Phalacrocorax carbo)

=== Flora ===
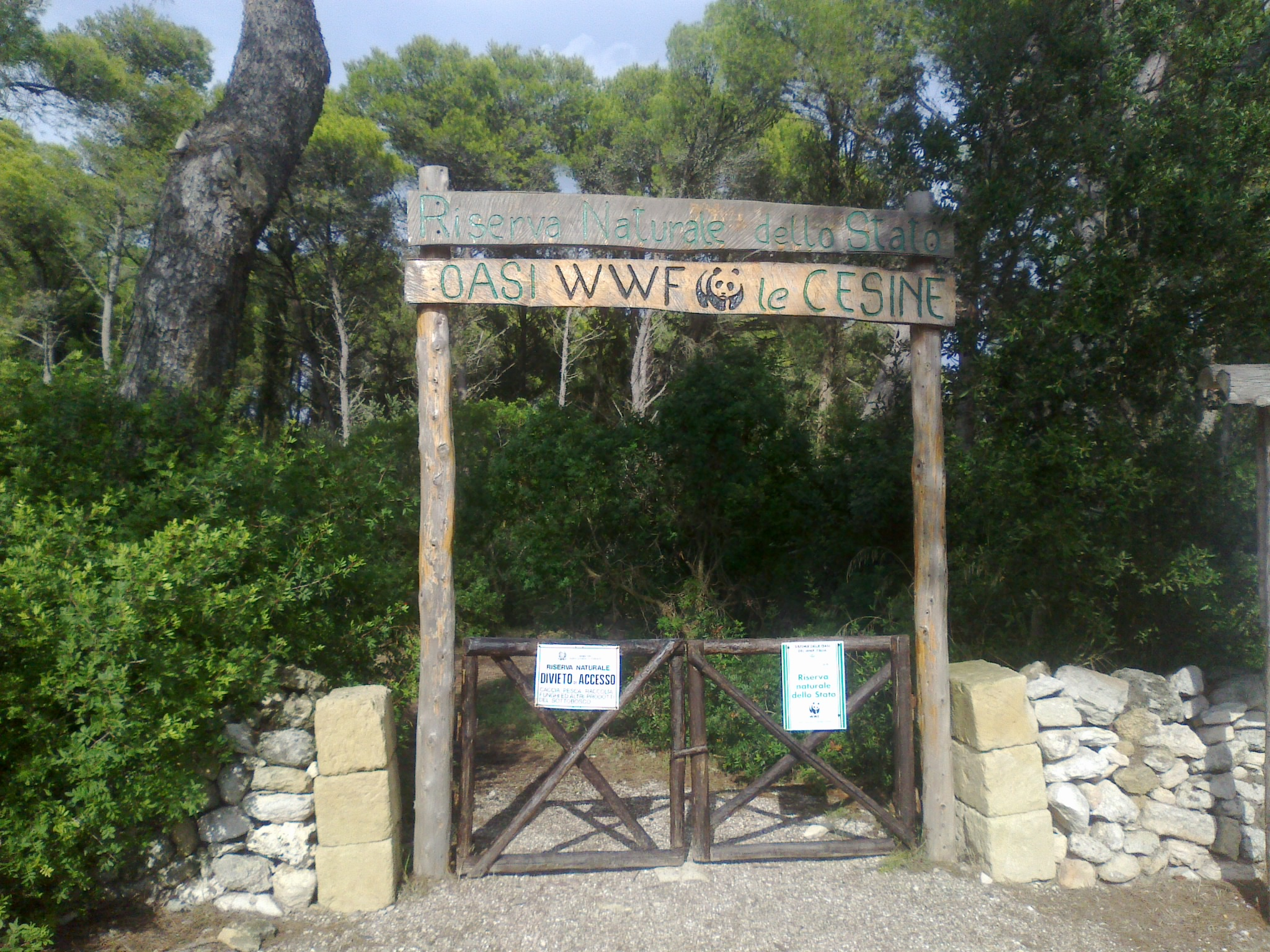

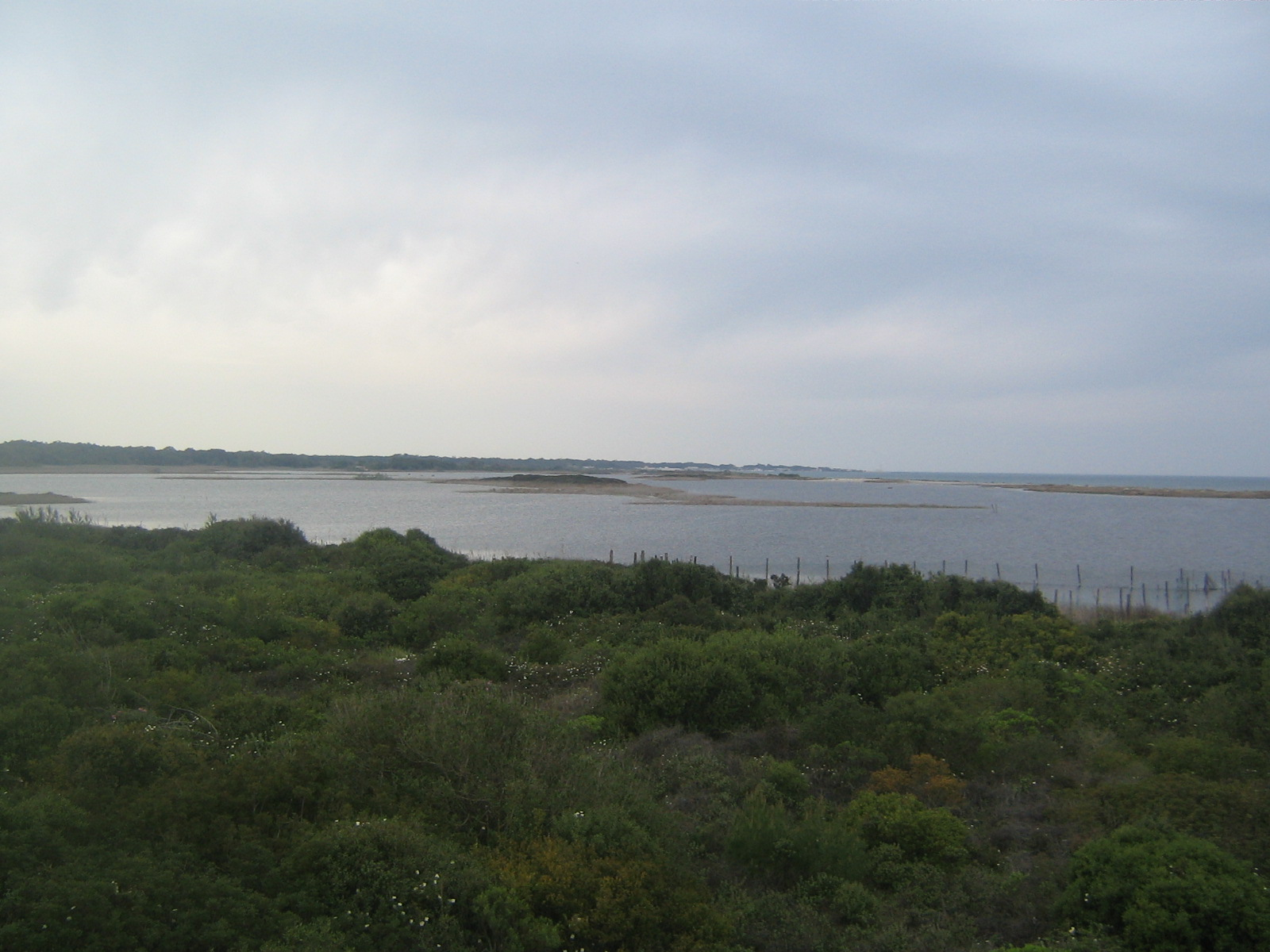

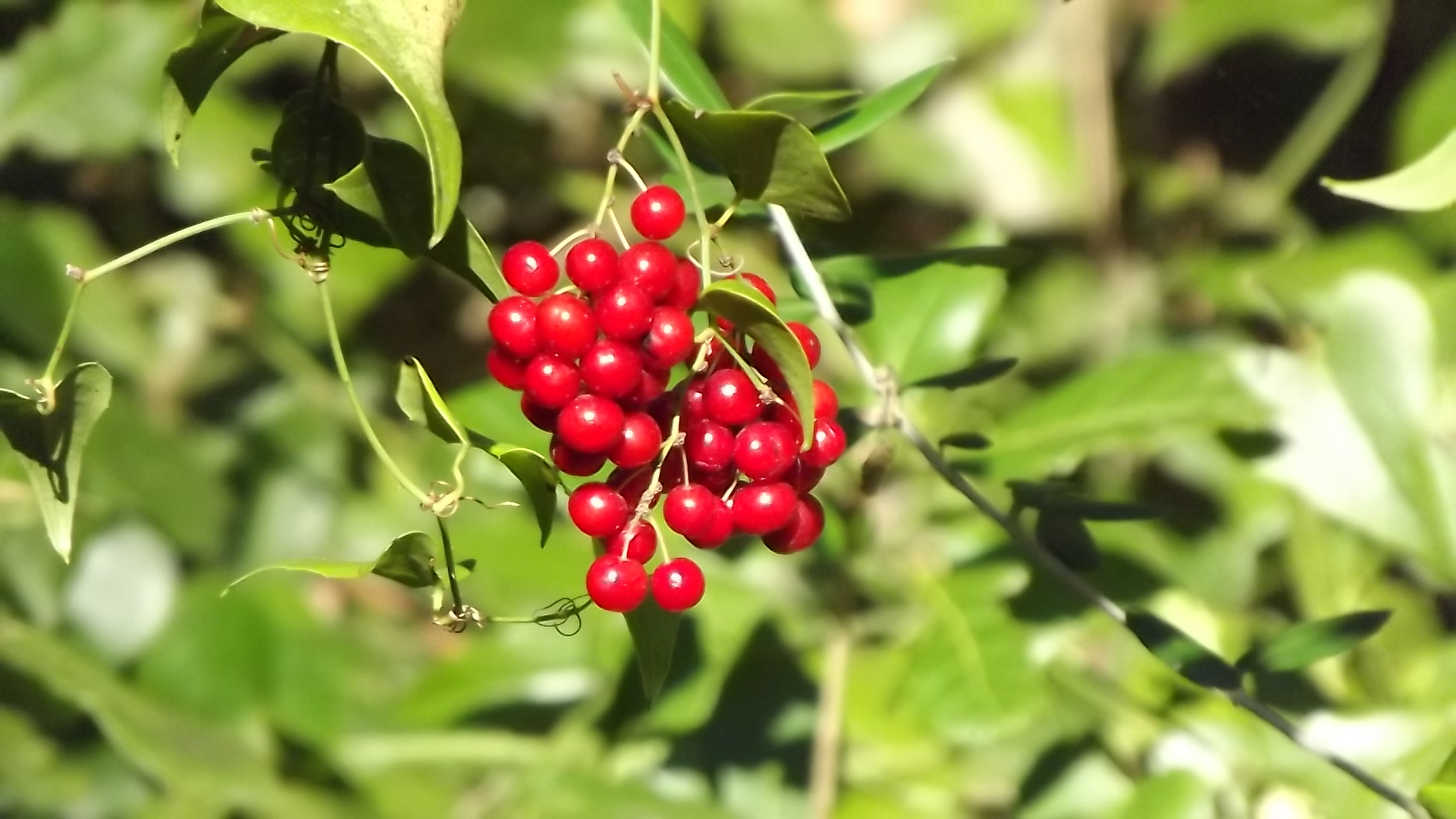

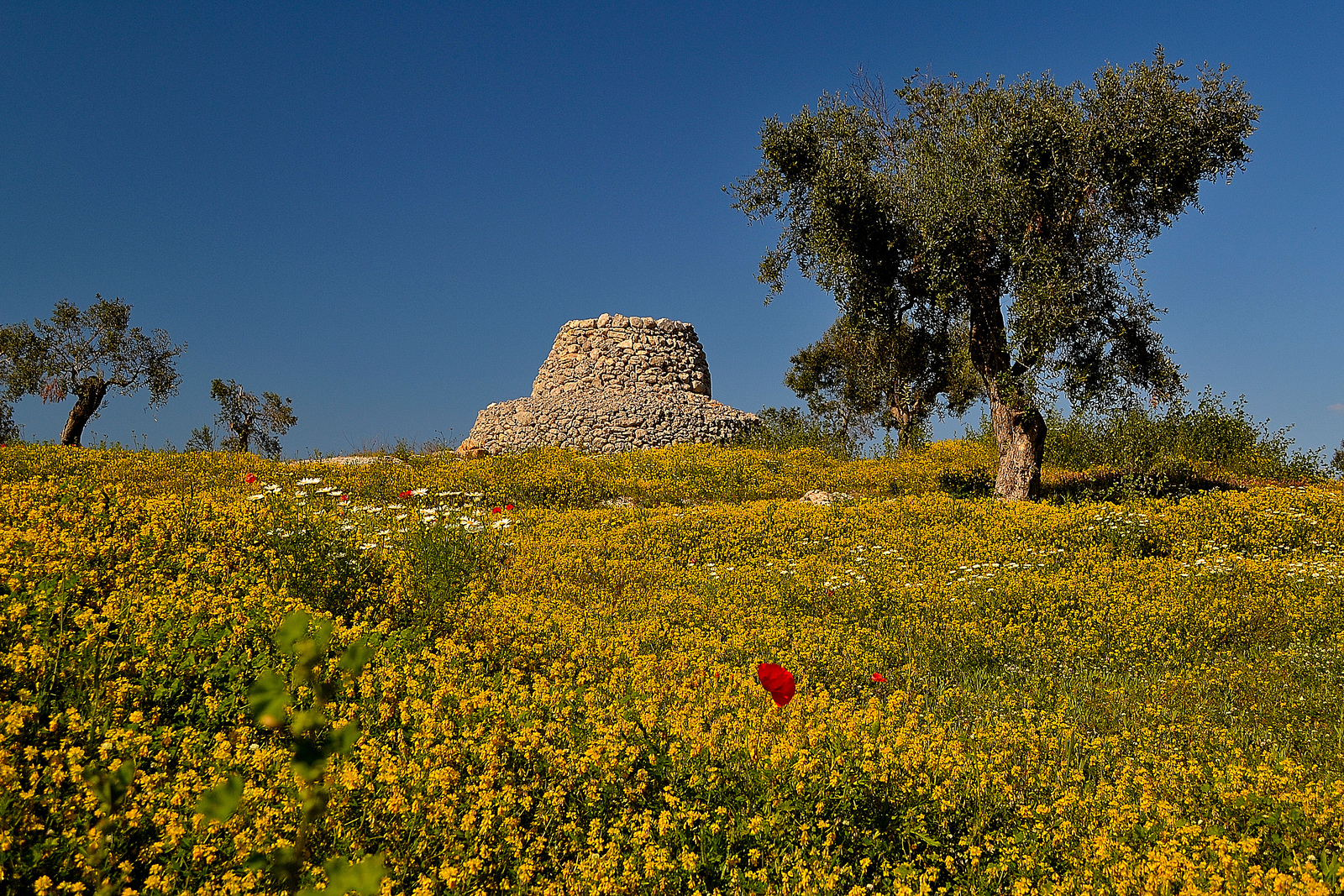

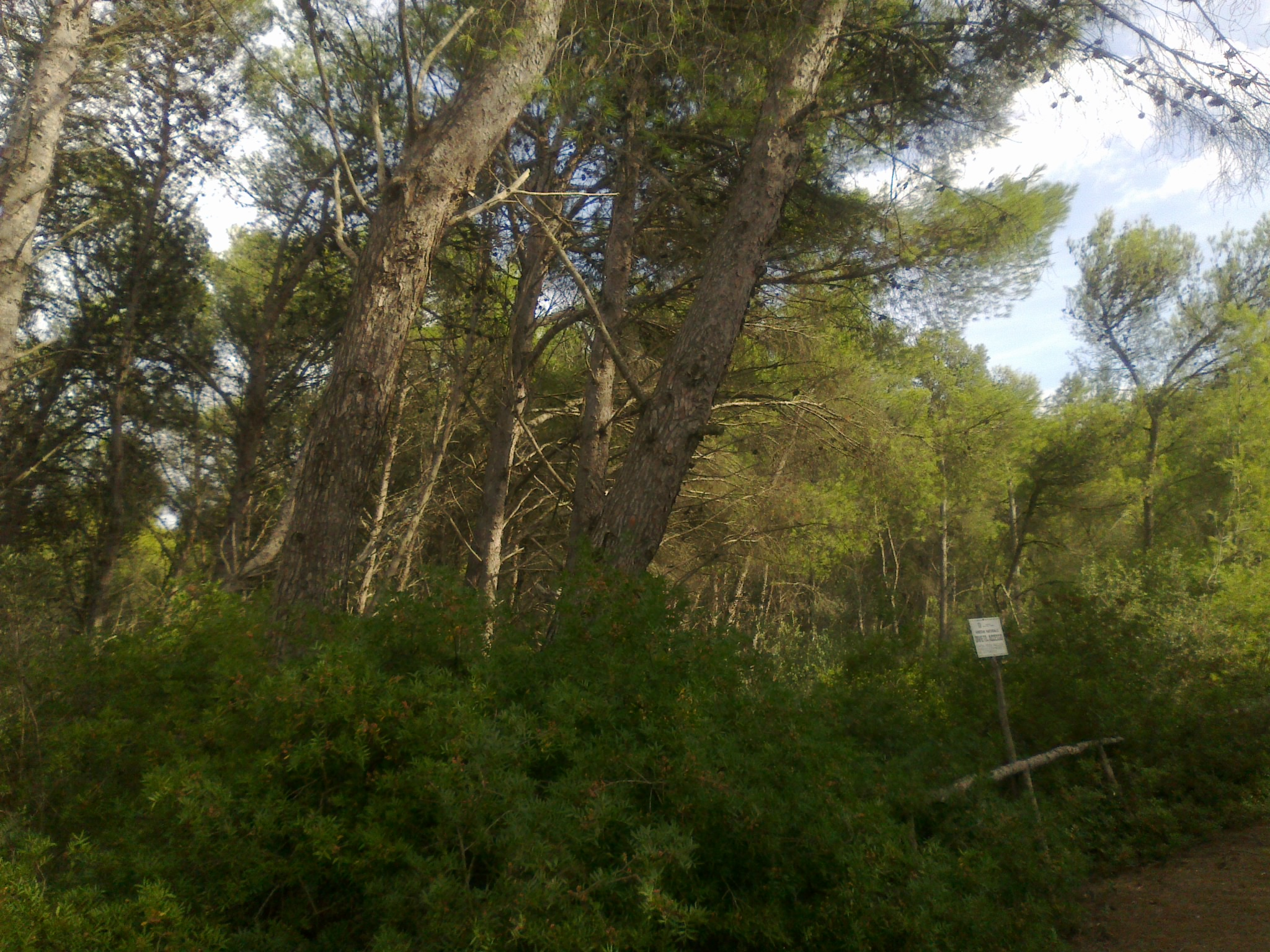

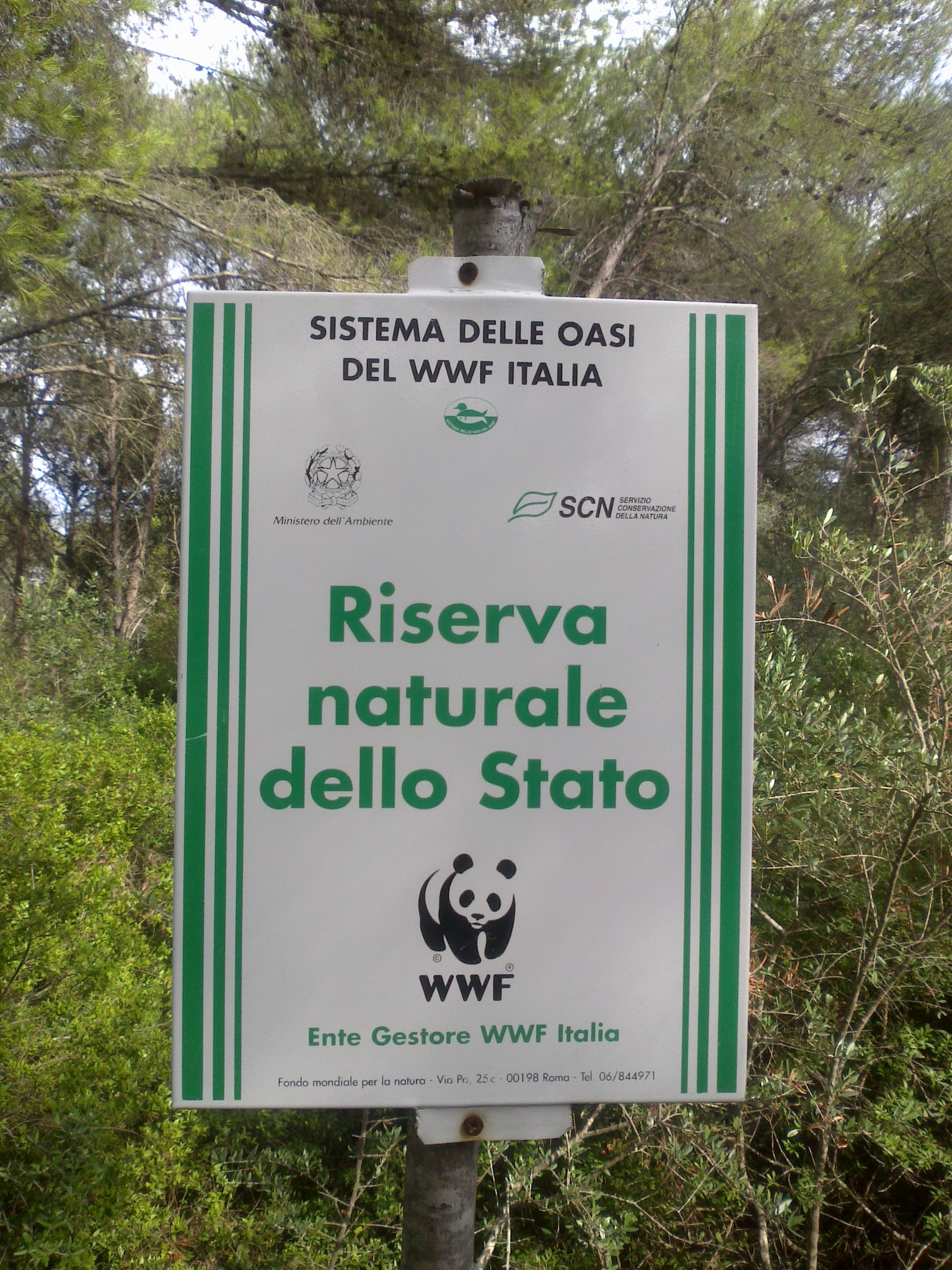

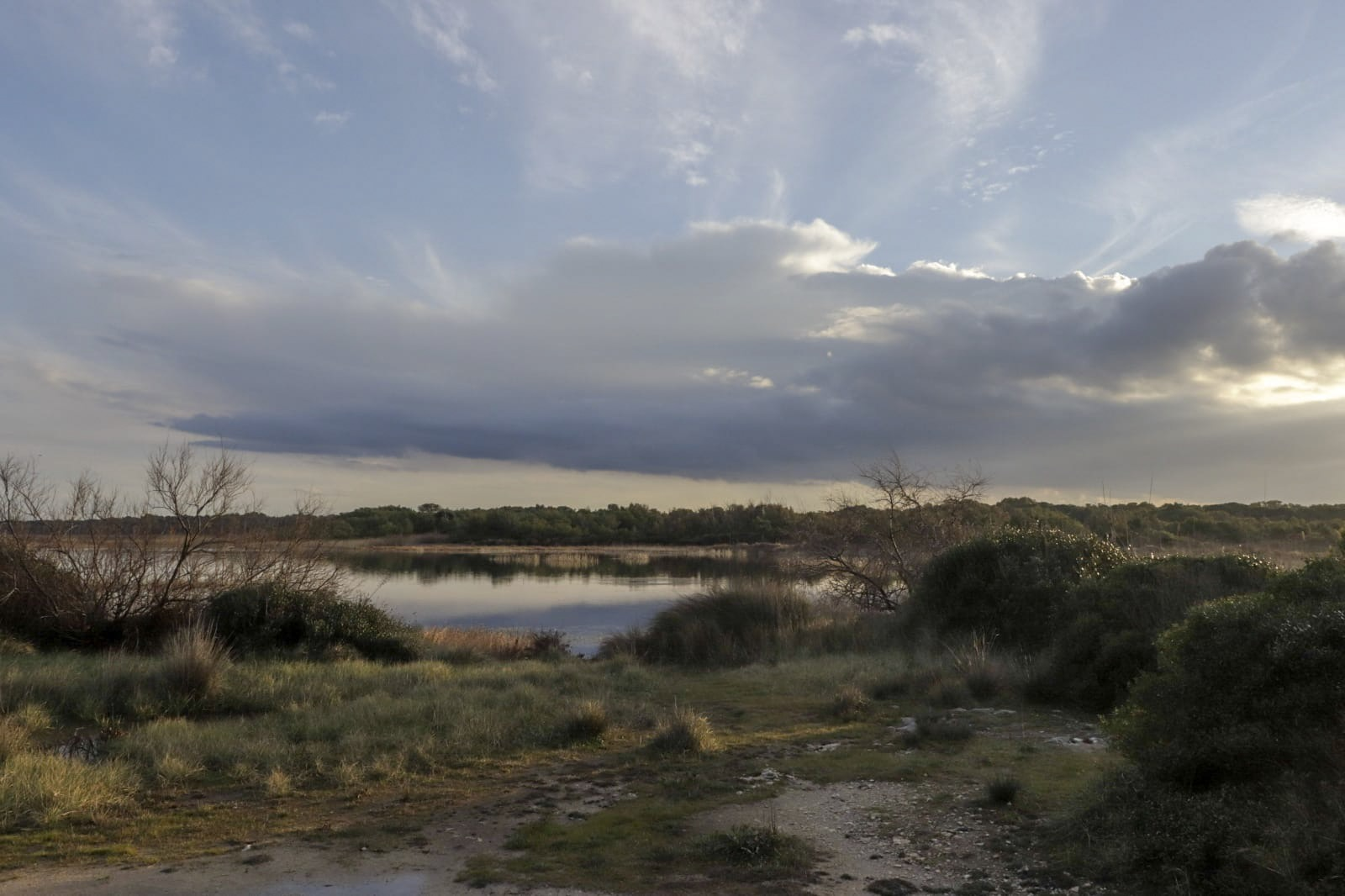
