= Cosimo De Giorgi =

Italian scientist (1842–1922)

Arcangelo Cosimo De Giorgi
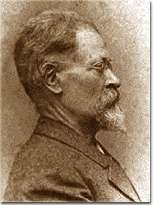
- Born: 9 February 1842; Lizzanello, Kingdom of the Two Sicilies
- Died: 22 December 1922 (aged 80); Lecce, Italy
- Education: University of Pisa

Cosimo De Giorgi or Arcangelo Cosimo De Giorgi (9 February 1842 – 22 December 1922) was an Italian scientist.

== Biography ==
=== Early life and education ===
Cosimo De Giorgi completed his early studies in Martano, his home town, and then continue them in Lecce at the Real Collegio of the Jesus. After completing his school studies he moved, with a daring journey (eight days for the only portion Lecce-Napoli), in Pisa, where he attend the University of Pisa medical school, following the family tradition. There, on 14 June 1864, he graduated in medicine. Then, he attend the Higher Institute of Florence in 1865 to specialize in medicine and surgery in the next year. Meanwhile, in the intention to continue their studies abroad, he had learned English, French and German. But the prospect faded early due to a family tragedy: in 1867 his father died for cholera. De Giorgi was forced to return to Lizzanello. Therefore, taken the medical profession and settled in Lecce with his mother and two brothers.

=== Activity ===
Throughout his life he mixed the medical profession with the teaching profession, teaching at the School Tecnico-Normale of Lecce. He also taught at the Educatorio Femminile (since 1875). He later carried out intensive research and study in the fields of paleontology, archeology, geography, hydrography, meteorology, geology, seismology, agriculture and hygiene.

He is credited with drawing the first geological map of Lecce province.

In 1874, he established the Lecce Meteorological Observatory.

== Awards and honors ==
In 1880 he was awarded the title of Knight of the Order of the Crown of Italy

In 1898, at the suggestion of Father Francesco Denza, he was appointed member of the Pontifical Academy of the New Lynxes.

He was awarded a silver medal by the Italian Geographical Society.

He was vice president of the Italian Meteoric Association.

There is a school in Lecce, Liceo Scientifico C. De Giorgi, named in his honor.

The municipality of Lizzanello has dedicated the Middle School and the way in which he was born.

== Publications ==
Cosimo De Giorgi published many works connected to his researches and studies. These publications are conserved in the Fondo de Giorgi at Biblioteca Provinciale N. Bernardini of Lecce.

A bibliography of Cosimo De Giorgi's collection is:

- Antonio Caiuli (cured by), Bibliografia di Cosimo De Giorgi, Congedo Editore, Galatina, 2002 ISBN 8880864602.

Some of his works are recently published:

- La Provincia di Lecce – Bozzetti di viaggio. Editore Giuseppe Spacciante, Lecce, 1882, (reprinted by Congedo Editore, Galatina, 1975)
- Viaggio nel Cilento. Giuseppe Galzerano Editore. 1995 (original title: Da Salerno al Cilento. M. Cellini & C., Firenze, 1882)
- Cilento - Geologia, Idrografia. Giuseppe Galzerano Editore, 2003

Cosimo De Giorgi's correspondence:

- Ennio De Simone, Epistolario di Cosimo De Giorgi: regesti|, Galatina, EdiPan, 2003, ISBN 88-88156-11-9.
- Ennio De Simone, Carteggi di Cosimo De Giorgi: regesti e lettere scelte, Galatina, EdiPan, 2007, ISBN 978-88-88156-54-5.

Additional works:

- Tracce d'antichità preistoriche nella Messapia. Bullettino di Paletnologia Italiana, 1882, 8, pp. 194–200.
- Un monumento arcaico ed una stazione con selcin megalitiche in Basilicata. Bullettino di Paletnologia Italiana, 1880, 6, pp. 77–79
- Un gruppo di dolmen fra Calimera e Melendugno in Terra d'Otranto. Bullettino di Paletnologia Italiana, 1911, 37, pp. 6–16
- I monumenti megalitici in Terra d'Otranto. Napoli, 1879
- I menhirs in Terra d'Otranto. Roma, 1880
- Monumenti del XV e XVI secolo nel Cilento. Roma, 1881
- Ricerche sul clima di Lecce. Lecce, 1982
- Antichità preistoriche della Messapia. Reggio Emilia, 1882
- Una carta topografica delle paludi e della malaria forte e debole in Terra d'Otranto. Lecce, 1884
- Note statistiche sul clima di Lecce. Lecce, 1885
- Note sull'idrografia della provincia di Lecce. Lecce, 1886
- Nuovi studi e ricerche sul clima della penisola salentina. Lecce, 1887
- La meteorologia e le sue applicazioni. Lecce, 1888
- L'Osservatorio di Lecce: sua storia. Lecce, 1888
- Note e ricerche sui materiali edilizi adoperati nella provincia di Lecce.Bari, 1901
- Cenni autobiografici. Lecce, 1914

== Bibliography ==
- Università di Lecce - Il Salento e la scienza
