= Vernole =

Vernole Ernòle (Greek)
- Comune
- Comune di Vernole
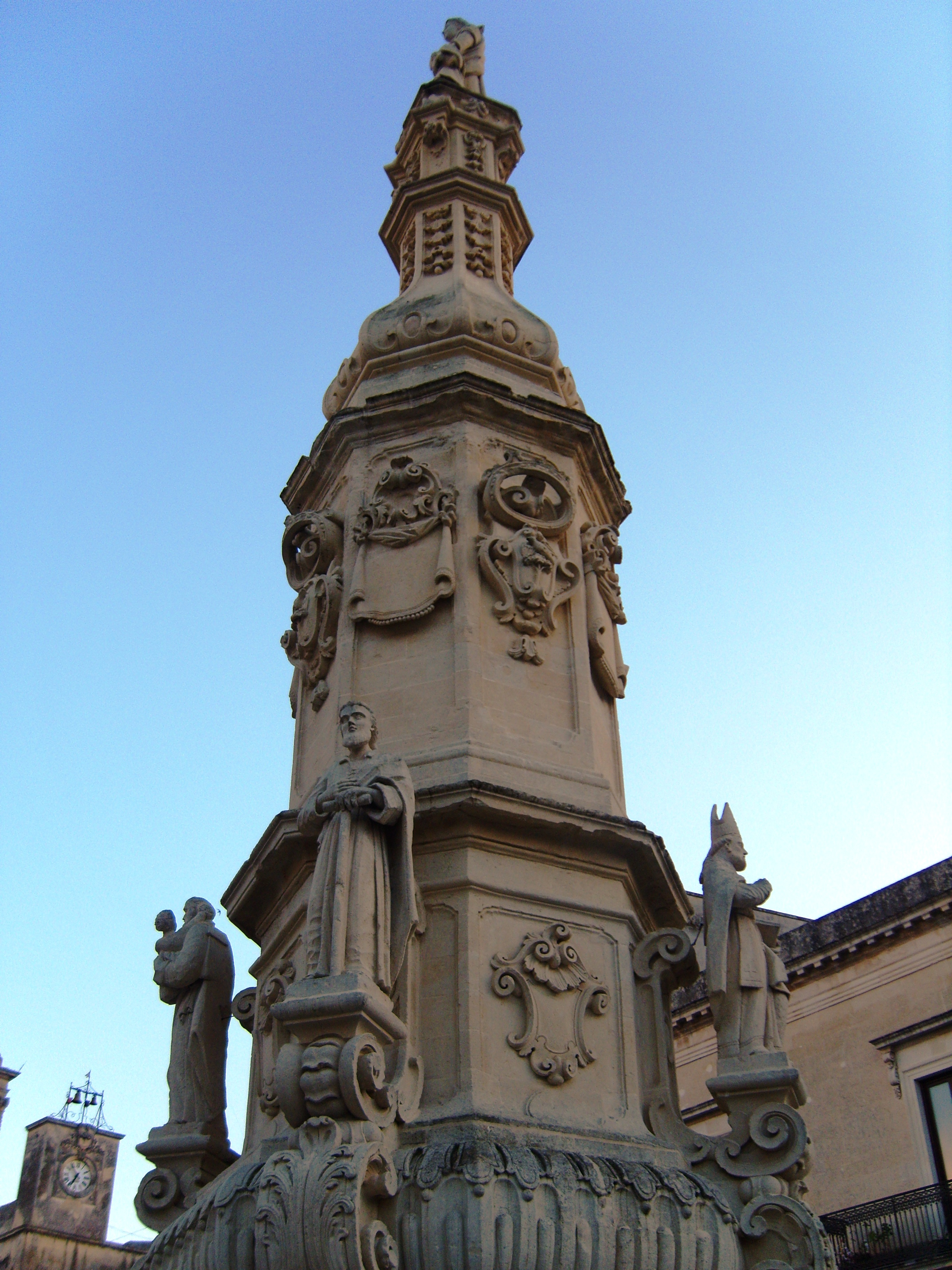
- Sant'Anna column in Vernole

- Location within Italy Location within Apulia
- Coordinates: 40°17′N 18°18′E
- Country: Italy
- Region: Apulia
- Province: Lecce (LE)
- Frazioni: Acaya, Acquarica di Lecce, Pisignano, San Cataldo, Strudà, Vanze

Area
  - Total: 60 km^{2} (23 sq mi)
- Elevation: 38 m (125 ft)

Population (November 2008)
  - Total: 7,450
  - Density: 120/km^{2} (320/sq mi)
- Demonym: Vernolesi
- Time zone: UTC+1 (CET)
  - Summer (DST): UTC+2 (CEST)
- Postal code: 73029
- Dialing code: 0832
- ISTAT code: 075093
- Patron saint: Sant'Anna and San Gioacchino
- Saint day: 26 July
- Website: Official website

Vernole (Salentino: Ernule) is a town and comune in the Italian province of Lecce in the Apulia region of south-east Italy.

The commune includes the village of Acaya, a fortified village with a castle.
