= Principality of Taranto =

Vassal state in southern Italy (1088–1465)

Coordinates: 40°28′N 17°14′E

Principality of Taranto Principatum Tarentinum (Latin)
- 1088–1465
- Coat of arms of Philippe of Anjou, prince of Tarente, before 1313

- Approximate area of the Principality of Taranto within the Kingdom of Sicily, c. 1154
- Status: Principality within the: Kingdom of Sicily (1130-1282); Kingdom of Naples (1282-1465)
- Capital: Taranto
- Common languages: Medieval Latin
- Religion: Roman Catholicism
- Prince
  - 1088–1111: Bohemond I (first)
  - 1463–1465: Isabella (last)
- History
  - Established: 1088
  - Death of Isabella of Clermont: 30 March 1465
Preceded by	Succeeded by
County of Apulia and Calabria	Kingdom of Naples

The Principality of Taranto (Latin: Principatum Tarentinum) was a state in southern Italy, created in 1088 for Bohemond I, eldest son of Robert Guiscard, as part of the peace between him and his younger brother Roger Borsa after a dispute over the succession to the Duchy of Apulia.

Taranto became the capital of the principality, which covered almost all of the heel of Apulia. During its subsequent 377 years of history, it was sometimes a powerful and almost independent feudal fief of the Kingdom of Sicily (and later of Naples), sometimes only a title, often given to the heir to the crown or to the husband of a reigning queen. When the House of Anjou was divided, Taranto fell to the house of Durazzo (1394–1463).

Ferdinand I of Naples united the Principality of Taranto to the Kingdom of Naples at the death of his wife, Isabella of Clermont. The principality came to an end, but the kings of Naples continued giving the title of Prince of Taranto to their sons, firstly to the future Alfonso II of Naples, eldest son of Isabella.

== Counts ==
- Geoffrey (1063 – bef. 1072)
- Richard (bef. 1072–1080)
  - Peter, as regent
- Robert Guiscard (1080–1085)
- Bohemond (1085–1088)

== Princes ==
=== Hauteville (Altavilla) dynasty ===
- 1088 - Bohemond I (1054–1111), later Bohemond I prince of the crusader state of Antioch;
- 1111 - Bohemond II (1108–1130), son of Bohemond I, also prince of Antioch;
- 1128 - King Roger II (1093–1154), cousin of Bohemond II, duke of Apulia, king of Sicily, unifier of Southern Italy;
- 1132 - Tancred, son of Roger II, prince of Bari, received the principality from his father;
- 1138 - William I, later king of Sicily, son of Roger II, became prince of Taranto at the death of his brother Tancred;
- 1144 - Simon, son of Roger II, became prince of Taranto when his brother William became prince of Capua and Duke of Apulia;
- 1157 - William II, later king of Sicily;
- 1189 - King Tancred of Sicily, Count of Lecce;
- 1194 - William III, king of Sicily (deposed), Count of Lecce;

=== Hohenstaufen (Svevia) dynasty ===
- 1194 - King Henry, husband of Constance of Sicily;
  - 1198 - Robert;
  - 1200 - Guy Walter III of Brienne, husband of (Albinia, Elvira) Mary of Lecce of Altavilla, daughter of King Tancred of Sicily (Tancred of Hauteville, Count of Lecce). Title confiscated at the death of Walter;
- 1205 - King Frederick;
- 1250 - Manfred of Sicily, son of Frederick II, later also king;

=== Angevin (Angiò) dynasty ===
- 1266 - King Charles I (1227–1285), defeated Manfred and was created King of Sicily by the pope;
- 1285 - King Charles II (1248–1309), son of Charles I, king of Naples;
- 1294 - Philip I (1278–1331), son of Charles II, and titular Latin Emperor;
- 1331 - Robert of Taranto (1299–1364), son of Philip I;
- 1346 - Louis of Taranto (1308–1362), son of Philip I, simultaneously king of Naples;
- 1364 - Philip II (1329–1374), son of Philip I, and titular Latin Emperor;
  - 1356 - Philip III, son of Philip II, died in his youth, the title returned to his father;

=== Baux (Del Balzo) dynasty ===
- 1374 - James of Baux, nephew of Philip II, and titular Latin Emperor;

=== Welf or Brunswick (Este del Guelfo) dynasty ===
- 1383 - Otto (1320–1398), widower of Joan I of Naples;

=== Orsini dynasty ===
- 1399 - Raimondo del Balzo Orsini, also known as Raimondello, husband of the Countess of Lecce Mary of Enghien, the Brienne heiress;
- 1406 - Ladislaus of Durazzo, king of Naples, second husband of Mary of Enghien;
- 1414 - James II of Bourbon-La Marche, husband of Joan II of Naples and briefly king-consort
- 1420 - Giovanni Antonio del Balzo Orsini, son of Mary of Enghien and Raimondello;
- 1463 - Isabella of Clermont, niece of Giovanni Antonio

== See also ==
- History of Taranto
