= Mary of Enghien =

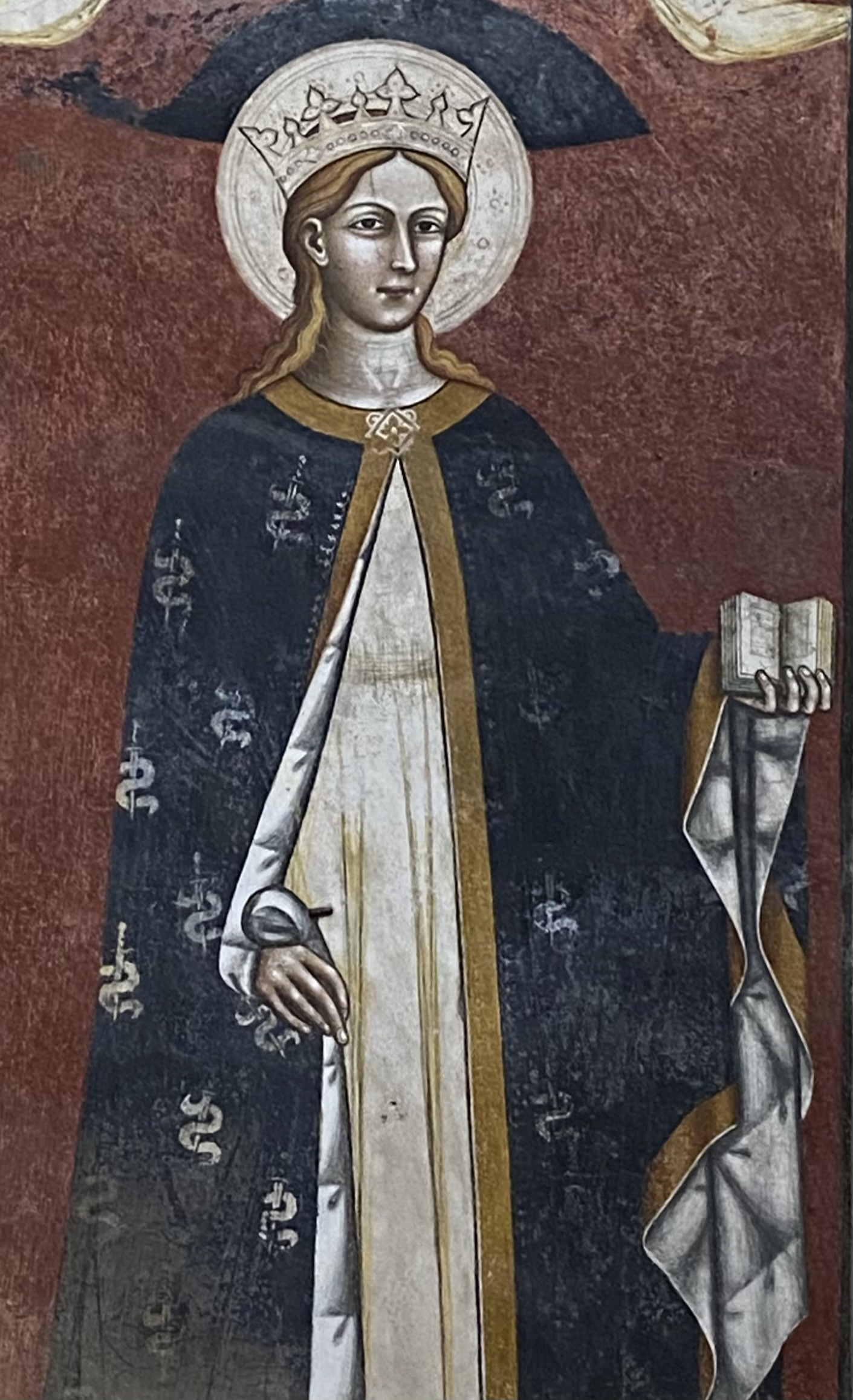
- Portrait of Mary of Enghien, Queen of Naples, first half of 15th century, fresco in Basilica of St. Catherine of Alexandria in Galatina (Lecce)

Countess of Lecce
- Reign: 1384–1446
- Predecessor: Peter of Enghien
- Successor: Giovanni Antonio Orsini Del Balzo

Queen consort of Naples
- Tenure: 1406 – 6 August 1414
- Born: 1367 or 1370
- Died: 9 May 1446
- Spouse: Raimondo Orsini Del Balzo; Ladislaus of Naples
- Issue More: Caterina del Balzo Orsini; Giovanni Antonio Orsini Del Balzo
- House: Enghien
- Father: John of Enghien
- Mother: Sancia del Balzo

Mary of Enghien, also known as Maria d'Enghien (1367 or 1370 – 9 May 1446), was ruling Countess of Lecce from 1384 to 1446 and Queen of Naples and titular Queen of Sicily, Jerusalem and Hungary from 1406 to 1414 by marriage to Ladislaus of Naples.

== Biography ==
=== Early life ===
Probably born in Lecce, Mary was the daughter of John of Enghien, Count of Castro, and Sancia Del Balzo.

Her paternal grandmother Isabella survived her brother Walter VI of Brienne, titular Duke of Athens etc., who died without issue at the Battle of Poitiers in 1356. As his heir, she became Countess of Lecce and Brienne etc. and titular Duchess of Athens. As her eldest son, Walter, had died before her brother, her second son, Sohier of Enghien, became her heir. She allowed her inherited lands to be divided among her numerous children during her lifetime. Mary's father, the third (but second surviving) son, had received the County of Lecce and the Lordship of Castro.

=== Countess of Lecce ===
Mary's father, John, died in 1373, leaving minor children. Mary's brother Peter of Enghien, also known as Pyrrhus (Pyrro or Pirro), became Count of Lecce. However, Peter died childless in 1384 and was succeeded by Mary and her husband, Raimondo del Balzo Orsini di Nola, whom she married in Taranto the same year.

Chroniclers describe her as beautiful, fearless and adventurous: adored by her children, loved by her first husband, besieged by King Ladislaus of Naples and treated cruelly by the king's sister.

She stayed in her castles of Lecce and Copertino when Raimondo travelled and served the king against the papal troops and the supporters of the junior Angevin line. She was occupied by her children, Maria, Caterina, Giovanni Antonio and Gabriele.

Raimondo became Prince of Taranto (in her hereditary rights) and died in 1406.

=== Queen of Naples ===
After her husband's death, she was besieged in Taranto (1406) and resisted the troops of Ladislaus for months, until he triumphed and imprisoned her and her children, demanding she marry him. Thus forced to marry Ladislaus, the wedding took place in the chapel of the Castle of Taranto. Her second marriage remained childless. Ladislaus died on 6 August 1414; his sister and successor, Joanna II of Naples, described as cruel, hated Mary and imprisoned her. However, Joanna's husband, James II, Count of La Marche, soon allowed her to leave. She returned to Lecce after Joanna had expelled her and her children from the royal estates to Tarentine lands.

Mary lived a long life and died in Lecce at the age of 78. In 1444 she witnessed the marriage of her granddaughter Isabella of Clermont, daughter of Tristan and Catherine and heiress to considerable feudal estates in Southern Italy, to Ferdinand of Aragon. He was the illegitimate son of King Alfonso V of Aragon, who had conquered Southern Italy in 1441.

== Children ==
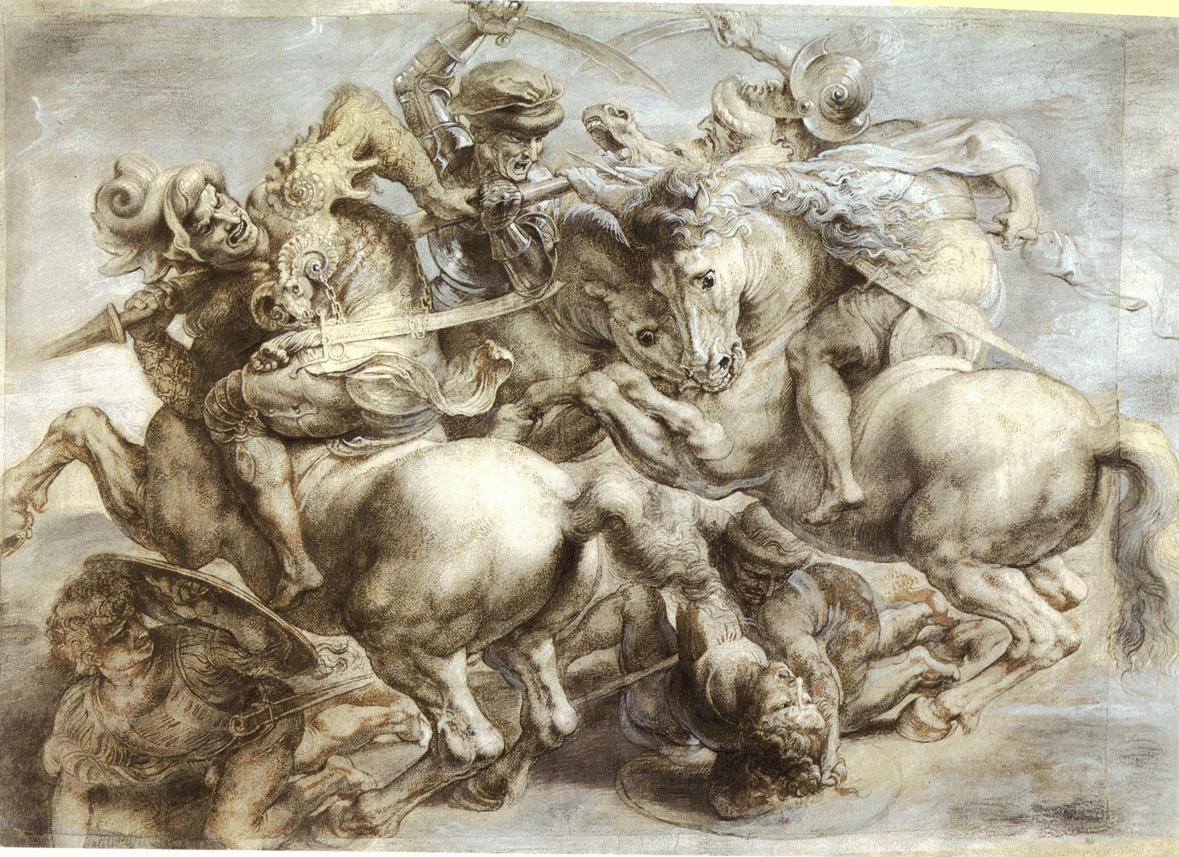
Peter Paul Rubens's copy of The Battle of Anghiari by Leonardo da Vinci. Allegedly the knight at far right is Giovanni Orsini.

Mary and Raimondo had:

- Maria del Balzo Orsini (died after 1410), married Antonio di Acquaviva, Duke of Atri, etc. Childless.
- Caterina del Balzo Orsini, also known as Catherine of Taranto. Married to Bartholomew Tristan of Clermont (Bartolomeo Tristano di Chiaramonte or Chiaromonte), a knight of the French de Clermont-Lodeve family. Tristan became Count of Capertino with his wife's dowry (the Catherine del Balzo Orsini, who lived almost at the same time and married Giulio Antonio di Aragona di Acquaviva, Duke of Atri, etc., bringing him the dowry of Casamassima and Conversano, was apparently not this Catherine but a relative, perhaps the daughter of Giovanni Antonio or the daughter of Gabriel, Duke of Venosa).
- Giovanni Antonio del Balzo Orsini, John, Prince of Taranto. Died childless in 1463, when his niece Isabella brought the fiefs to her husband King Ferrante.
- (possibly natural son of her husband) Gabriele del Balzo Orsini (d. 1453), Count of Ugento, etc., Duke of Venosa. Married Giovanna Caracciolo del Sole dei Duchi di Melfi.

== Sources ==
- Luttrell, Anthony (1966). "The Latins of Argos and Nauplia: 1311-1394". Papers of the British School at Rome. 34. British School at Rome: 34–55. doi:10.1017/S0068246200007455. JSTOR 40310660. S2CID 179112752.
- Paoletti, John T.; Radke, Gary M. (2005). Art in Renaissance Italy. Laurence King Publishing Ltd.
- Williams, George L. (1998). Papal Genealogy: The Families and Descendants of the Popes. McFarland & Company, Inc.

Royal titles
Preceded by Mary of Lusignan	Queen consort of Naples; 1406 – 6 August 1414	Succeeded by James II, Count of La Marche as king consort
Regnal titles
Preceded by Peter of Enghien	Countess of Lecce; 1384–1446 with Raimondo Orsini Del Balzo and Ladislaus of Naples	Succeeded by Giovanni Antonio Orsini Del Balzo
