= Cavallino =

Cavallino Kàbas (Greek)
- Comune
- Comune di Cavallino
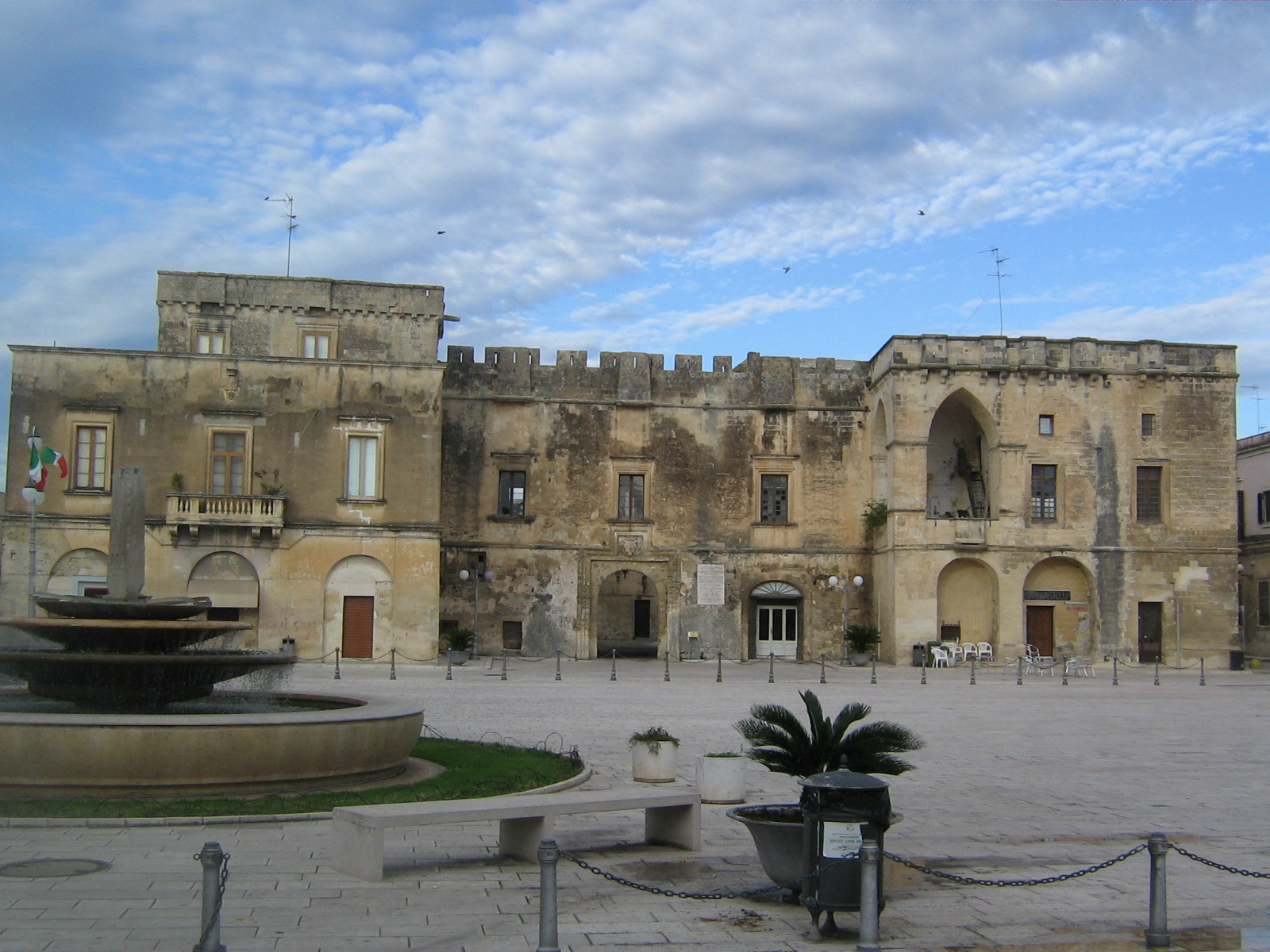
- Ducal castle.

- Coat of arms

- Location within Italy Location within Apulia
- Coordinates: 40°19′N 18°12′E
- Country: Italy
- Region: Apulia
- Province: Lecce (LE)

Government
  - Mayor: Bruno Ciccarese

Area
  - Total: 22.65 km^{2} (8.75 sq mi)
- Elevation: 38 m (125 ft)

Population (30 June 2017)
  - Total: 12,787
  - Density: 564.5/km^{2} (1,462/sq mi)
- Demonym: Cavallinesi
- Time zone: UTC+1 (CET)
  - Summer (DST): UTC+2 (CEST)
- Postal code: 73020
- Dialing code: 0832
- ISTAT code: 075020
- Patron saint: St. Dominic
- Saint day: 4 August
- Website: Official website

Cavallino (Salentino: Caḍḍrinu) is a town and comune in the province of Lecce in the Apulia region of south-east Italy.

== Main sights ==
- Mother church (Chiesa madre), built from 1630. It has a Baroque-style exterior and a Latin cross plan.
- Dominican church and convent
- Pit of St. Dominic (1633)
- Ducal Castle (late 15th century)
- Menhir of Ussano
