= List of Neapolitan royal consorts =

This is a list of consorts of Naples. Many kings of Naples had more than one wife; they may have divorced their wife or she might have died.

== Early Byzantine Duchesses of Naples ==
See Also: Dukes of Naples

- Drosu, wife of Sergius I
- Theodora, Roman senatrix, daughter of Giovanni and his wife Theodora, daughter of Theophylacto I of Tusculum & his wife Theodora; wife of John III
- Limpiasa of Capua, daughter of Richard I of Capua and Fredesenda of Hauteville, married Sergius VI in April 1078 also held title of Protosebastē
- Eva (or Anna) of Gaeta, daughter of Geoffrey Ridell, Duke of Gaeta, wife of John VI, also held title of Protosebastē

== Royal consort of Naples ==
=== Capetian House of Anjou, 1282–1382 ===
Picture	Name	Father	Birth	Marriage	Became Consort	Ceased to be Consort	Death	Spouse
	Margaret of Burgundy	Odo, Count of Nevers (Burgundy)	1250	18 November 1268	1282 husband's ascession	7 January 1285 husband's death	4 September 1308	Charles I
	Maria of Hungary	Stephen V of Hungary (Árpád)	1257	May/June 1270	7 January 1285 husband's ascession	5 May 1309 husband's death	25 March 1323	Charles II
	Sancha of Majorca	James II of Majorca (Barcelona)	1285	20 September 1304	5 May 1309 husband's ascession	20 January 1343 husband's death	28 July 1345	Robert
	Andrew of Hungary	Charles I of Hungary (Anjou)	30 October 1327	early 1342	August 1344 wife's ascession	18/19 September 1345		Joanna I
	Louis of Tarent	Philip I of Taranto (Anjou)	1320	22 August 1347		18 August 1348 became wife's co-ruler	26 May 1362	Joanna I
	James IV of Majorca	James III of Majorca (Barcelona)	c. 1336	26 September 1363		20 January 1375		Joanna I
	Otto of Brunswick-Grubenhagen	Henry II of Brunswick and Lunenburg (Grubenhagen) (Welf)	1320	25 September 1376		26 August 1381 wife's deposition	1 December 1398	Joanna I

=== House of Anjou-Durazzo, 1382–1435 ===
Picture	Name	Father	Birth	Marriage	Became Consort	Ceased to be Consort	Death	Spouse
	Margaret of Durazzo	Charles, Duke of Durazzo (Anjou-Durazzo)	28 July 1347	February 1369	12 May 1382 husband's ascension	24 February 1386 husband's death	6 August 1412	Charles III
	Costanza de Clermont	Manfredo de Clermont, Conte di Motica (Clermont)	?	1390	-	1392 divorce	?	Ladislaus
	Mary of Lusignan	James I of Cyprus (Lusignan)	c. 1381	12 February 1403		4 September 1404		Ladislaus
	Mary of Enghien	John of Enghien, Count of Lecce (Enghien)	c. 1367/1370	c. 1406		6 August 1414 husband's death	9 May 1446	Ladislaus
	James II, Count of La Marche	John I, Count of La Marche (Bourbon)	1370	10 August 1415		2 February 1435 wife's death	24 September 1438	Joanna II

The rule of the House of Durazzo was contested by the Dukes of Anjou of the House of Valois, who led several military expeditions into the kingdom. In the end Queen Joanna II, being heirless, recognized Duke Louis III in 1426 as Duke of Calabria and heir. Louis predeceased her, but his brother René inherited his claim. Joanna recognised René as her heir before her death.

=== House of Valois-Anjou, 1382–1426 and 1435–1442 ===
Picture	Name	Father	Birth	Marriage	Became Consort	Ceased to be Consort	Death	Spouse
	Marie of Blois-Châtillon	Charles of Blois-Châtillon, Duke of Brittany (Châtillon)	c. 1345	8 July 1360	12 May 1382 husband's ascension as titular king	20 September 1384 husband's death	12 November 1404	Louis I
	Yolande of Aragon	John I of Aragon (Barcelona)	11 August 1384	2 December 1400		29 April 1417 husband's death	14 November 1442	Louis II
	Margaret of Savoy	Amadeus VIII, Duke of Savoy (Savoy)	c. 1410/1417/7 August 1420	c. 1424/31 August 1432		12 November 1434 husband's death	30 September 1479	Louis III
	Isabelle de Lorraine	Charles II, Duke of Lorraine (Lorraine)	c. 1400	24 October 1420	2 February 1435 husband's ascension	c. 1442 husband's flight; reverted to titular queen	28 February 1453	René
	Jeanne de Laval	Guy XIV de Laval, Count of Laval (Laval)	10 November 1433	10 September 1454		10 July 1480 husband's death	19 December 1498	René
	Jeanne de Lorraine	Frederick II of Vaudémont (Lorraine)	1458	21 January 1474	10 July 1480 husband's ascension	25 January 1480		Charles IV of Anjou

Louis I, Duke of Anjou, was the adopted heir of Joanna I. He succeeded her, de jure, on her death in 1382. His descendants fought the House of Durazzo, mostly in vain, but not without any successes, for the throne until an agreement was reached between Louis III and Joanna II whereby she recognised him and his house as her heirs. René, Louis's brother, succeeded Joanna in 1435.

René had a contestant in King Alfonso V of Aragon who had been previously considered as a successor by Joanna II but had been later discarded in favour of René's brother. Alfonso conquered the kingdom manu militari and René was forced to flee. René's claim was inherited by either his nephew (Charles IV of Anjou, who died in 1481, leaving his claims to French king Louis XI) or his grandson (René II of Lorraine). The latter's descendants continued to claim the throne of Naples, as did the French kings, down to 1529, and intermittently until 1559.

=== House of Trastámara, 1442–1501 ===
Picture	Name	Father	Birth	Marriage	Became Consort	Ceased to be Consort	Death	Spouse
	Maria of Castile	Henry III of Castile (Trastamara)	1 September 1401	12 October 1415	2 June 1442 husband became King of Naples	4 October 1458		Alfonso I
	Isabella of Clermont	Tristan de Clermont, Count of Copertino	1424	30 May 1444/5	27 June 1458 husband's accession	30 March 1465		Ferdinand I
	Joanna of Aragon	John II of Aragon (Trastámara)	c. 1454/16 June 1455	14 September 1476		25 January 1494 husband's death	9 January 1517	Ferdinand I
	Joanna of Naples	Ferdinand I (Trastámara)	1478	1496		7 September 1496 husband's death	27 August 1518	Ferdinand II
	Isabella del Balzo	Pietro del Balzo, Duke of Andria (del Balzo)	?	28 November 1486	7 September 1496 husband's accession	1501 husband's desposition	1533	Frederick IV

The French conquered the kingdom in 1501 and King Frederick was taken as a prisoner to France, where he died.

=== House of Valois-Orléans, 1501–1504 ===
Picture	Name	Father	Birth	Marriage	Became Consort	Ceased to be Consort	Death	Spouse
	Anne of Brittany	Francis II, Duke of Brittany (Dreux-Montfort)	25 January 1477	8 January 1499	c. 1501 husband's accession	29 December 1503 husband's desposition	9 January 1514	Louis III

The kingdom was conquered by the Spanish in 1504, after the Battle of the Garigliano

=== House of Trastamara, 1504–1516 ===
Picture	Name	Father	Birth	Marriage	Became Consort	Ceased to be Consort	Death	Spouse
	Isabella I of Castile	John II of Castile (Trastámara)	22 April 1451	19 October 1469	29 December 1503 husband's ascension	26 November 1504		Ferdinand III
	Germaine of Foix	John of Foix, Viscount of Narbonne (Foix-Grailly)	c. 1488	19 October 1505		23 January 1516 husband's death	18 October 1538	Ferdinand III

=== House of Habsburg, 1516–1700 ===
Picture	Name	Father	Birth	Marriage	Became Consort	Ceased to be Consort	Death	Spouse
	Isabella of Portugal	Manuel I of Portugal (Aviz)	24 October 1503	11 March 1526		1 May 1539		Charles IV
	Mary I of England	Henry VIII of England (Tudor)	18 February 1516	25 July 1554		17 November 1558		Philip I
	Elisabeth of Valois	Henry II of France (Valois)	2 April 1545	22 June 1559		3 October 1568		Philip I
	Anna of Austria	Maximilian II, Holy Roman Emperor (Habsburg)	1 November 1549	4 May 1570		26 October 1580		Philip I
	Margaret of Austria	Charles II, Archduke of Austria (Habsburg)	25 December 1584	18 April 1599		3 October 1611		Philip II
	Elisabeth of France	Henry IV of France (Bourbon)	22 November 1602	25 November 1615	31 March 1621 husband's ascension	6 October 1644		Philip III
	Mariana of Austria	Ferdinand III, Holy Roman Emperor (Habsburg)	24 December 1634	7 October 1649		17 September 1665 husband's death	16 May 1696	Philip III
	Marie Louise of Orléans	Philippe I, Duke of Orléans (Orléans)	26 March 1662	19 November 1679		19 12 February 1689		Charles V
	Maria Anna of Neuburg	Philipp Wilhelm, Elector Palatine (Wittelsbach)	28 October 1667	14 May 1690		1 November 1700 husband's death	16 July 1740	Charles V

=== House of Bourbon, 1700–1713 ===
Picture	Name	Father	Birth	Marriage	Became Consort	Ceased to be Consort	Death	Spouse
	Maria Luisa of Savoy	Victor Amadeus II of Savoy (Savoy)	17 September 1688	2 November 1701		11 April 1713; Naples ceded to Austria	14 February 1714	Philip IV

The Spanish lost the kingdom to the Austrians during the War of the Spanish Succession.

=== House of Habsburg, 1714–1734 ===
Picture	Name	Father	Birth	Marriage	Became Consort	Ceased to be Consort	Death	Spouse
	Elisabeth Christine of Brunswick-Wolfenbüttel	Louis Rudolph, Duke of Brunswick-Lüneburg (Welf)	28 August 1691	1 August 1708	11 April 1713 husband's ascension	25 May 1734; Naples ceded to Spain	21 December 1750	Charles VI

The kingdom was conquered by a Spanish army in 1734, during the War of the Polish Succession. Together with Sicily Naples was recognized independent under a cadet branch of the Spanish Bourbons by the Treaty of Vienna in 1738.

=== House of Bourbon, 1735–1806 ===
Picture	Name	Father	Birth	Marriage	Became Consort	Ceased to be Consort	Death	Spouse
	Maria Amalia of Saxony	Augustus III of Poland (Wettin)	24 November 1724	19 June 1738		10 August 1759 husband's abdication, elevated to Queen of Spain	27 September 1760	Charles VII
	Maria Carolina of Austria	Francis I, Holy Roman Emperor (Habsburg-Lorraine)	13 August 1752	12 May 1768		8 September 1814		Ferdinand IV

=== House of Bonaparte and House of Murat, 1806–1815 ===
Picture	Name	Father	Birth	Marriage	Became Consort	Ceased to be Consort	Death	Spouse
	Marie Julie Clary	François Clary	26 December 1771	1 August 1794	30 March 1806 husband's accession	1 August 1808 husband's abdication, elevated to Queen of Spain	7 April 1845	Joseph
	Maria Annunziata Carolina Bonaparte	Carlo Maria Buonaparte (Bonaparte)	25 March 1782	20 January 1800	1 August 1808 husband's accession	3 May 1815 husband's deposition	18 May 1839	Joachim

=== House of Bourbon, 1815–1816 ===
none

In 1816 King Ferdinand IV merged the two Kingdoms of Naples and Sicily into the new Kingdom of the Two Sicilies and took the new title of Ferdinand I, King of the Two Sicilies.

== See also ==
- List of monarchs of Naples
- Duchess of Calabria
- List of royal consorts of the Kingdom of the Two Sicilies
- List of Sicilian consorts
- List of Italian consorts
- List of Sardinian consorts
- List of Aragonese consorts
- Royal Consorts of Spain
- List of French consorts
- List of Angevin consorts
- List of Lotharingian consorts
