= Goffredo Marzano, Count of Alife =

Nobleman of the Kingdom of Naples

Goffredo Marzano (c. 1350 – after 1404) was a nobleman of the Kingdom of Naples who served as grand chamberlain in 1391–1393 and 1398–1399.

A scion of the noble Marzano family, Goffredo was the son of Roberto and brother of Giacomo, both of whom served as grand admiral of the kingdom. An important source for his life are the reports in the Diurnali del duca di Monteleone. He took part in the siege of Teano in 1373 and afterwards acquired the city. In 1381, he was one of the founding members of the Order of the Ship. On 10 November 1383, when Pope Urban VI was received in Naples, he accompanied King Charles III in holding the pope's reigns and leading him to the Castel Capuano. In 1384, he took part in the fighting against Louis II of Anjou in Apulia.

Following Charles III's death in 1386, Marzano supported his widow, the regent Margaret of Durazzo. In October 1389, he brought Costanza Chiaramonte from Sicily to marry the young king Ladislaus in Gaeta. In 1390, he was one of Margaret's envoys to Pope Boniface IX who arranged Ladislaus' coronation. Between 1391 and 1393 he was the grand chamberlain with an annual salary of 75 onze.

In 1392, Marzano defended Aversa from the forces of Louis II. In 1393, he attended Ladislaus' parliament in Gaeta and joined him on campaign against L'Aquila. In 1395, the Sanseverino pealed the Marzano away from their allegiance to Ladislaus through a marriage project that never came to fruition. In 1398, Goffredo seized Capua and placed a certain Roberto di Prata in charge of the city. Ladislaus's forces besieged Capua for four months before it fell, but Marzano escaped to Alife. On 14 May 1398, Ladislaus reached a peace agreement with the Marzano brothers; Giacomo Orsini, Count of Tagliacozzo; and Giacomo Stendardo. Goffredo was rapidly restored to favour. Before the end of the year he was again grand chamberlain, an office he held into the following year.

Giacomo died in 1402 and Goffredo became the guardian of his nephew, Giovanni Antonio Marzano. In this capacity, he refortified Sessa Aurunca, Rocca Montis Dragonis and Teano. Ladislaus arranged the marriage of his illegitimate son Rinaldo with Marzano's daughter, but when Marzano came to Naples in 1404 to celebrate the wedding he was imprisoned in the Castel Nuovo. His counties of Alife and Teano were confiscated. The date of his death is unknown.

== Bibliography ==
- Boulton, D'A. J. D. (2000). The Knights of the Crown: The Monarchical Orders of Knighthood in Later Medieval Europe (1325–1520). Boydell Press.
- Gambella, Angelo (2013). "Alife e i centri abitati della diocesi dal XIII al XV secolo. Studio su popolazione e tasse". Annuario dell'Associazione Storica del Medio Volturno: 251–279.
- Kiesewetter, Andreas (2004). "Ladislao d'Angiò Durazzo, re di Sicilia". Dizionario Biografico degli Italiani (in Italian). Vol. 63: Labroca–Laterza. Rome: Istituto dell'Enciclopedia Italiana. ISBN 978-88-12-00032-6.
- Sardina, Patrizia (2008). "Marzano, Goffredo". Dizionario Biografico degli Italiani (in Italian). Vol. 71: Marsilli–Massimino da Salerno. Rome: Istituto dell'Enciclopedia Italiana. ISBN 978-88-12-00032-6.
