= Giacomo Orsini, Count of Tagliacozzo =

Italian nobleman (died 1431)

Giacomo Orsini (c. 1379 – 1431) was an Italian nobleman and condottiero of the Orsini family. He was the count of Tagliacozzo from 1394 until his death, sometimes loyal to the Kingdom of Naples, other times to the Papal State.

Orsini was born shortly before 1380 to Giovanni Orsini and Nicoletta Orsini, the daughter of Gentile Orsini, count of Sovana. His father died on 31 August 1390, shortly after his uncle, Rinaldo Orsini. He was too young to maintain his father and uncle's control over Orvieto, Spoleto and L'Aquila. On 1 April 1391, he signed an accord with Pope Boniface IX by which he agreed to hand over the Rocca Albornoziana in Spoleto in exchange for the Castello di San Polo in Tivoli, of which he took possession on 21 May. In 1394, he reached an agreement with his cousin Maria, the heiress of Rinaldo, whereby he inherited the county of Tagliacozzo and the family's other possessions in the Valle dell'Aniene and the Marsica. His title and his fiefs were confirmed by King Ladislaus of Naples on 2 September 1395.

Orsini acquired many fiefs in Lazio and the Abruzzo, as well as immovable property in Rome itself. In 1400, he purchased castles at Torano and, in 1407, the castle of Pozzaglia Sabina. In 1403, his tax liability was reduced by the king. In 1404, the queen mother, Margaret of Durazzo, gave him an annual pension of 30 once and the fiefs of Capistrello, Civitella, Civita d'Antino, Meta and Pescocanale in exchange for those of Avezzano and Luco. In 1407, he purchased Mentana.

Orsini entered Rome with the Neapolitan army in April 1408. In 1409, however, he broke with Ladislaus and sided with Pope Alexander V. As a reward, the pope declared the county of Tagliacozzo detached from the Kingdom of Naples (13 August 1409) and attached to the Papal State, with Orsini as perpetual vicar. Ladislaus rival, Duke Louis II of Anjou, who claimed the kingdom, confirmed the detachment of Tagliacozzo and conferred on Orsini the county of Albe. In celebration of his new right to mint coin in the pope's name, Orsini minted bolognini with the pope's effigy and the inscription Tagliacozzo in the years 1409–1410. At the head of his own troops and a French contingent, he took part in the siege of Rome, entering the city on 2 January 1410. When Ladislaus retook the city during his offensive of 1413, Orsini lost Mentana to Orso Orsini di Monterotondo.

Following Ladislaus's death, Orsini received a pardon from Queen Joan II on 6 January 1417. On 24 April, she confirmed his titles and fiefs. Pope Martin V, through Lorenzo Onofrio Colonna, also confirmed Orsini's possessions in the Papal State. Orsini was in the army of Muzio Attendolo Sforza that Joan sent against Braccio da Montone in August. Although restored to favour in Naples, he recovered Mentana only after a court case that lasted from 1421 to 1424 and after paying compensation in 1426–1427 to Orso's widow, Lorenza Conti, and her minor son, Jacopo Orsini.

Orsini was captured near Faenza on 8 July 1425 while serving the Republic of Florence against the Duchy of Milan during the wars in Lombardy. He died in 1431. By his wife Isabella, daughter of Goffredo Marzano, Count of Alife, whom he had married in 1394, he had two sons and two daughters. He was succeeded in Tagliacozzo by his eldest son, Giovanni Antonio. He died childless and the county passed to the children of his sister, Girolama, whose husband, Carlo Orsini, was lord of Bracciano. Another sister, Angelella, married Giacomo Caetani, count of Fondi, in 1426. The younger son of Giacomo Orsini, Rinaldo Orsini, became a condottiero in Tuscany.

There is a manuscript (Lat. 1961) in the Vatican Library that once belonged to the count of Tagliacozzo. It contains the Historie of Riccobaldo of Ferrara and the Historia Apollonii. Orsini may have acquired it from his uncle, Cardinal Giacomo Orsini. A record of his ownership is found in a pastedown at the back.

== Bibliography ==
- Grierson, Philip; Travaini, Lucia (1998). Medieval European Coinage, Volume 14: Italy (III) – South Italy, Sicily, Sardinia. Cambridge: Cambridge University Press.
- Labande, Edmond-René (1932). "Le rôle de Rinaldo Orsini dans la lutte entre les papes de Rome et d'Avignon (1378–1390)". Mélanges de l'École française de Rome. 49: 157–180.
- Luiten, Loek (2023). "In Support of Pontifical Power: The Papacy and the Papal States' Baronial Nobility, 1417–49". Renaissance Quarterly. 76 (3): 807–847. doi:10.1017/rqx.2023.405.
- Pio, Berardo (2013). "Orsini, Giacomo". Dizionario Biografico degli Italiani (in Italian). Vol. 79: Nursio–Ottolini Visconti. Rome: Istituto dell'Enciclopedia Italiana. ISBN 978-88-12-00032-6.
- Robins, William (2015). "The Proemium in Historia Apollonii: A Possible Source for the Decameron?". Carte Romanze. 3 (2): 259–279.
