= Battle of Ponza (1435) =

Naval battle in 1435

Coordinates: 40.9000°N 12.9667°E

- Part of Aragonese conquest of Naples
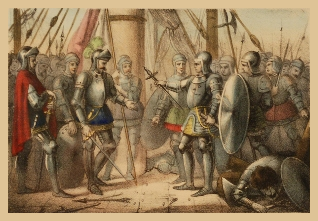
- The surrender of Alfonso
Date	5 August 1435
Location	Island of Ponza, Tyrrhenian Sea
Result	Genoese victory

Belligerents
Duchy of Milan; Republic of Genoa	Crown of Aragon

Commanders and leaders
Filippo Visconti; Biagio Assereto; Jacopo Giustiniani	Alfonso V of Aragon; King of Aragon (POW); John II of Aragon; King of Navarre (POW); Henry of Aragon; Prince Infante (POW)

Strength
Genoese fleet: 3 galleys 13 vessels 2,400 soldiers	Aragonese fleet: 11 galleys 14 vessels 6,000 soldiers

Casualties and losses
90 killed	600 killed ~100 Aragonese nobles captured 13 vessels lost

The naval battle of Ponza was fought in early August 1435, when the Duke of Milan dispatched the Genoese navy to relieve the besieged town of Gaeta, which was currently under threat from the King of Aragon.

== Conflict ==
Joan II, Queen of Naples, died on 2 February 1435, and by her will bestowed Rene d'Anjou with the crown of Naples. However, Alfonso, king of Aragon and Sicily, whom Queen Joan II had primarily adopted, claimed the succession, on the ground of this first adoption. Thus the successionist war between the House of Anjou and the House of Barcelona over the Kingdom of Naples ensued.

At this critical moment Rene d'Anjou was currently imprisoned in the Duchy of Burgundy and Alfonso of Aragon lost no time in stirring up his partisans in the Kingdom of Naples, whilst he himself sailed from Sicily with a large fleet to besiege Gaeta.

Gaeta itself was garrisoned by the Genoese who shortly after Queen Joan's death dispatched Francesco Spinola with 800 infantry. The Duke of Milan (to whom the Republic of Genoa had lately submitted) sided with the House of Anjou and dispatched a Genoese fleet in July under Biagio Assereto in order to relieve Gaeta. Alfonso immediately sailed against the Genoese fleet with superior numbers. The two fleets met near the island of Ponza and after a long and gallant conflict, which lasted for ten hours, the Genoese were completely victorious. The royal galley of Aragon was compelled to strike, and Alfonso V, King of Aragon was captured.

== Aftermath ==
The siege of Gaeta was lifted, and the return of the Genoese fleet was met with a triumphant reception at Genoa. The King and all the noble Aragonese prisoners were then brought to Milan before the Duke, and with this one strike the war seemed already over.
However the King of Aragon managed to persuade the Duke of Milan to his side and against Rene d'Anjou, and was set at liberty with all other prisoners. The Genoese were so utterly exasperated by the Duke's decision that they started to rebel against him, drove out the Milanese garrison and overthrew his rule on 27 December 1435.

== See also ==
- Kingdom of Naples
- Crown of Aragon
- Republic of Genoa
