= Palazzo Marigliano, Naples =

Renaissance-style palace in central Naples, Italy

Coordinates: 40.849635°N 14.258846°E

The Palazzo Marigliano, also known as Palazzo di Capua, is a Renaissance-style palace in Central Naples, Italy. It is located on the Via San Biagio dei Librai number 39.

== History ==
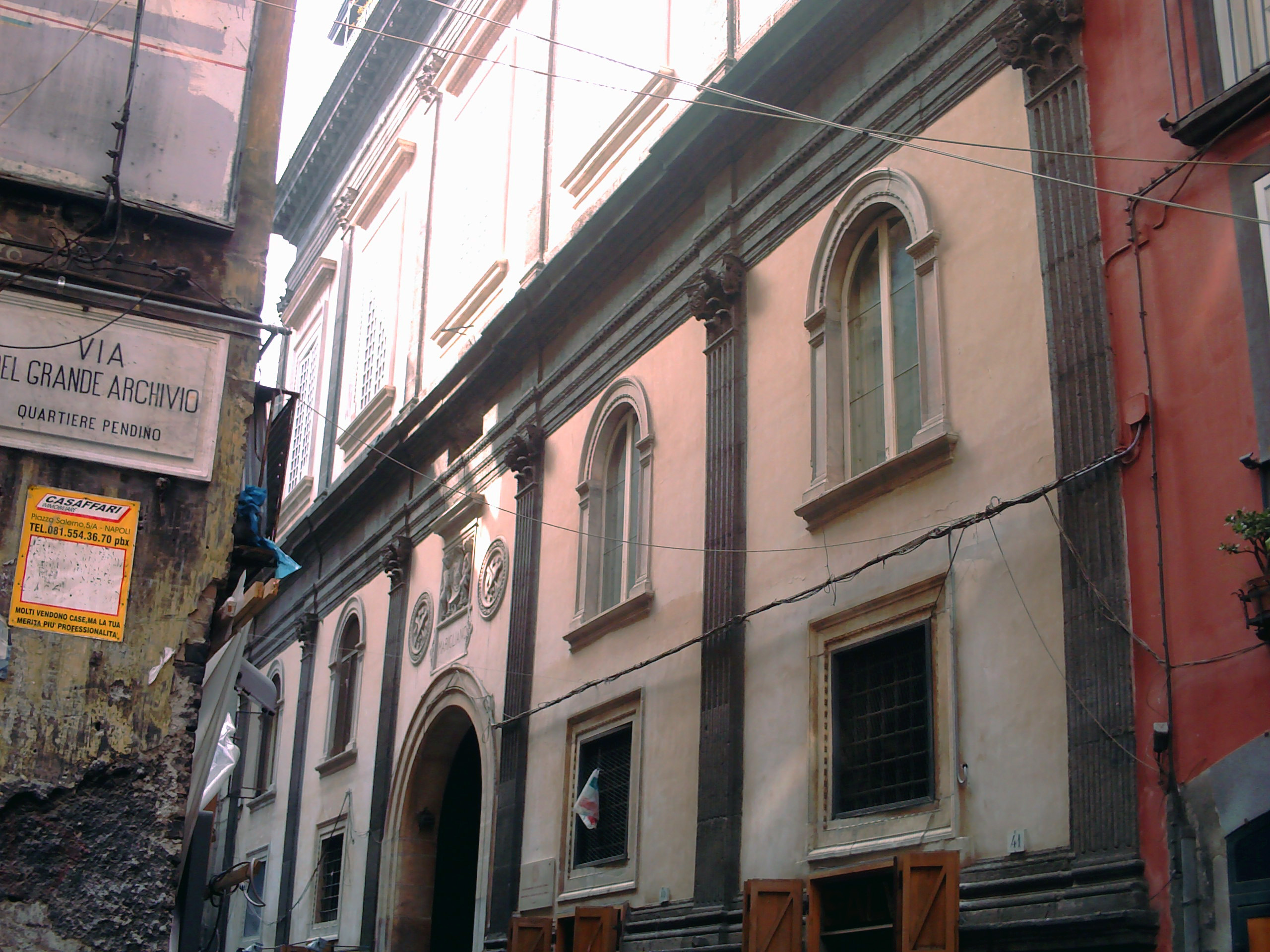
Palace facade

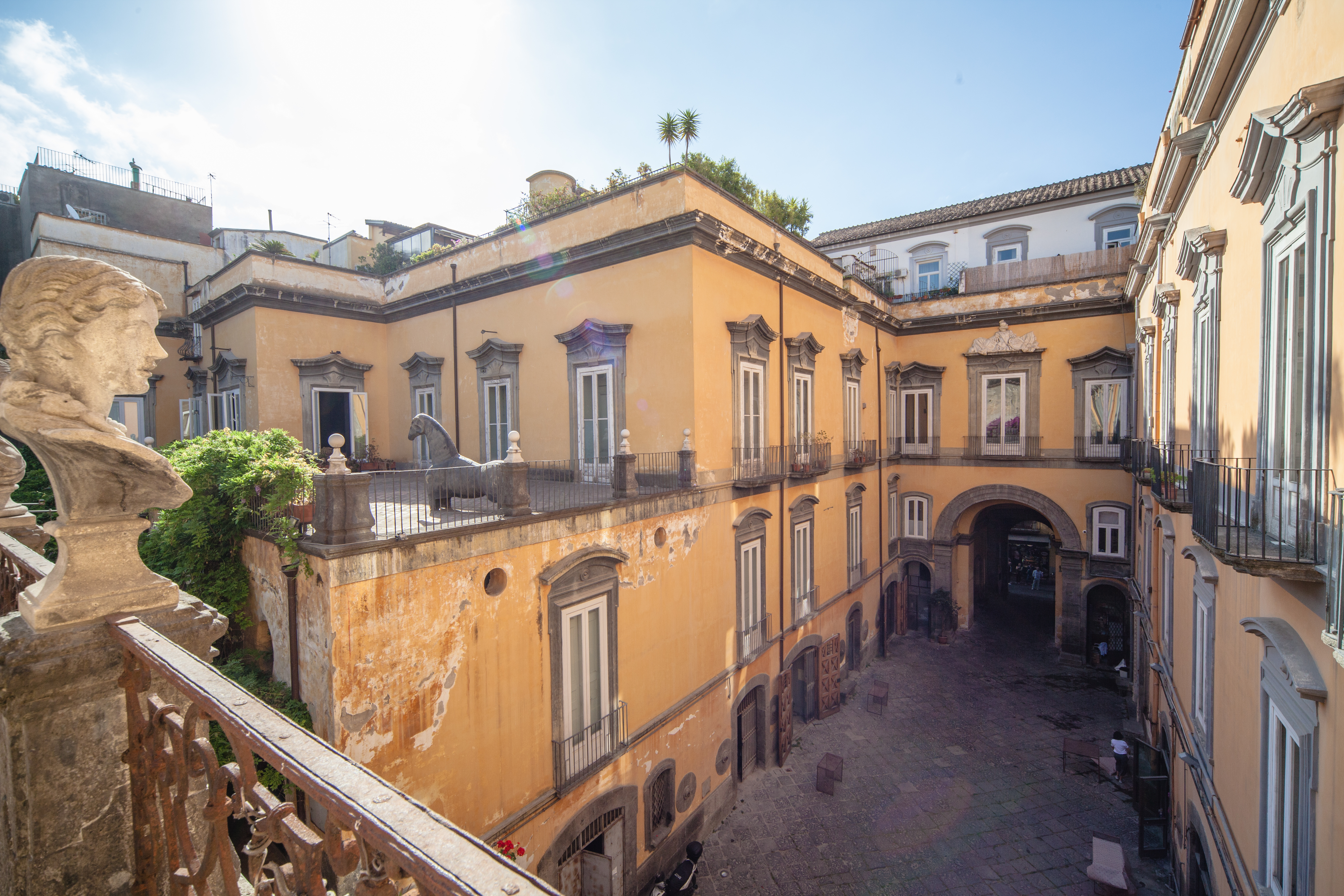
Internal courtyard

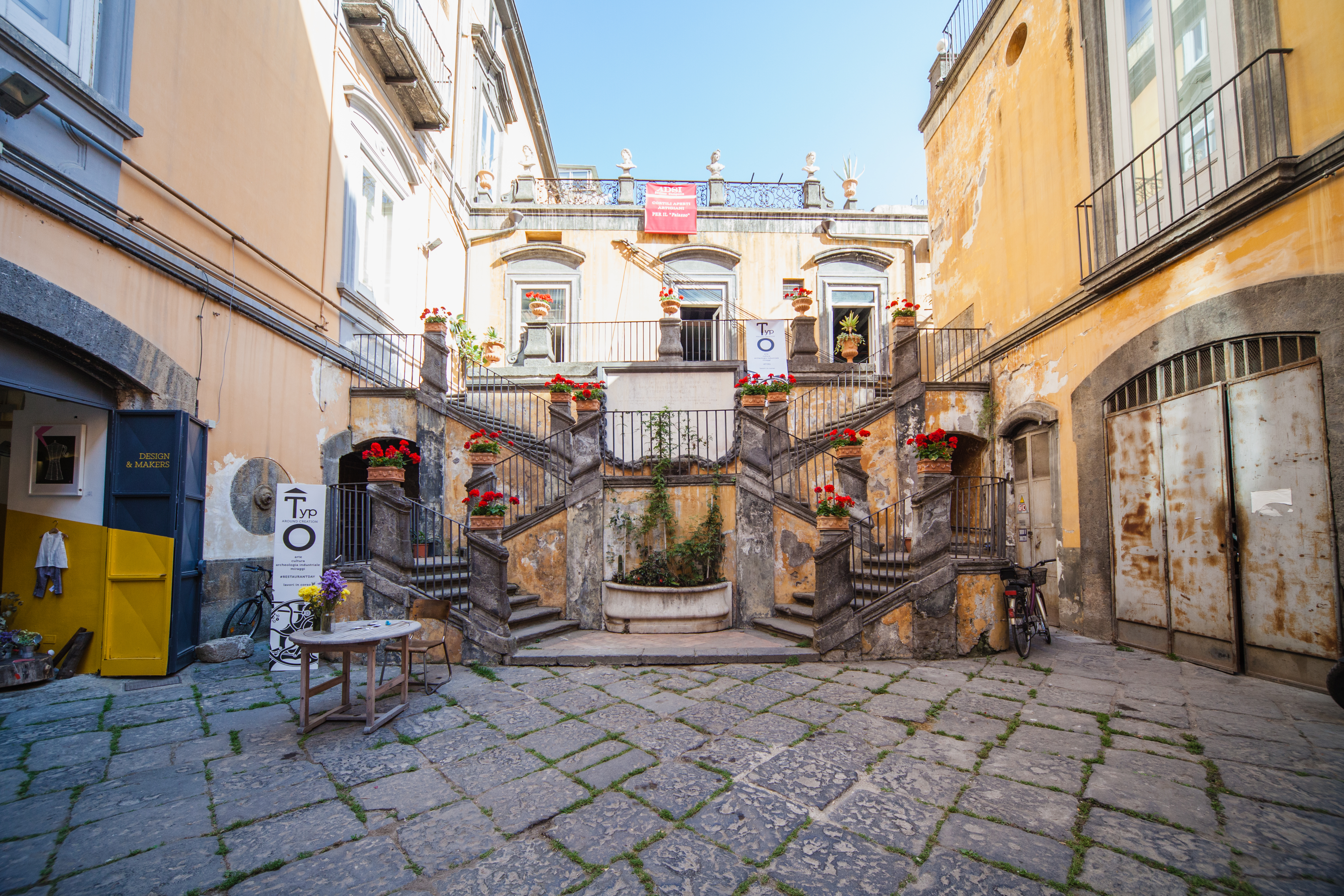
Internal courtyard and stairwell

The palace was designed by Giovanni Donadio, known as il Mormando, and built in 1512-1513. This palace replaced a prior home belonging to Bartolomeo di Capua, Prince of Riccia and Count of Altavilla. The structure has been modified over the years.

Two marble tablets in the entry portal recall historical associations of the palace.

- Constance Chiaramonte was a daughter of Manfredi III Chiaramonte, the lord of Palermo. She was married in Gaeta at the age of 12 years, to Ladislaus of Durazzo, who soon became King Ladislaus of Naples. However the fortunes of the Chiaramonte family were changing: her father died in 1391, and her brother was caught and executed by the Aragonese forces of Martin I of Aragon, who had declared himself Martin II of Sicily. With this turn of fortunes, Ladislaus obtained an annulment or divorce by decree of the pope, and in 1392 even had the Archbishop of Gaeta announce the dissolution of the marriage in church and obtain the marriage ring. Constance was forced to marry the 4th Count of Altavilla, Andrea di Capua, son of Bartolomeo, and Protonotary of the Kingdom, who was residing in this palace. At the public wedding ceremony, Costanza was said to have proclaimed to her groom, to pride himself as having the king's wife and queen for a concubine.
- This palace was a meeting place for those involved, led by Gaetano Gambacorta, in the unsuccessful 1701 Conspiracy of Macchia (Congioura di Macchia) that occurred during the Wars of Spanish Succession.

In the mid-1750s, the palace was refurbished by Bartolommeo di Capua. He commissioned from Francesco de Mura, frescoes for the ballroom, recalling the exploits of his similarly named father in battles with King Charles VII of Naples (Charles III of Spain). At the 1744 Battle of Velletri, Bartolomeo the elder sacrificed his life by providing the King with a horse. The work was heavily damaged by bombardment during 1942. Other paintings inside are allegorical scenes (1765) by Giovanni Battista Maffei.

With the end of the family line of Capua the house passed on to a second son of Sanserverino di Bisognano, count of Saponara. In the 19th century, they sold palace to Francesco Saverio Marigliano, duke of Monte. In the hall of Armor, the walls are painted heraldic symbols of families related to the Marigliano family. The private chapel has a fresco by Maffei.

Today much of the palace is occupied by the Soprintendenza Archivistica della Campania.
