= Aragonese conquest of Naples =

Conquest of the Kingdom of Naples by Aragon

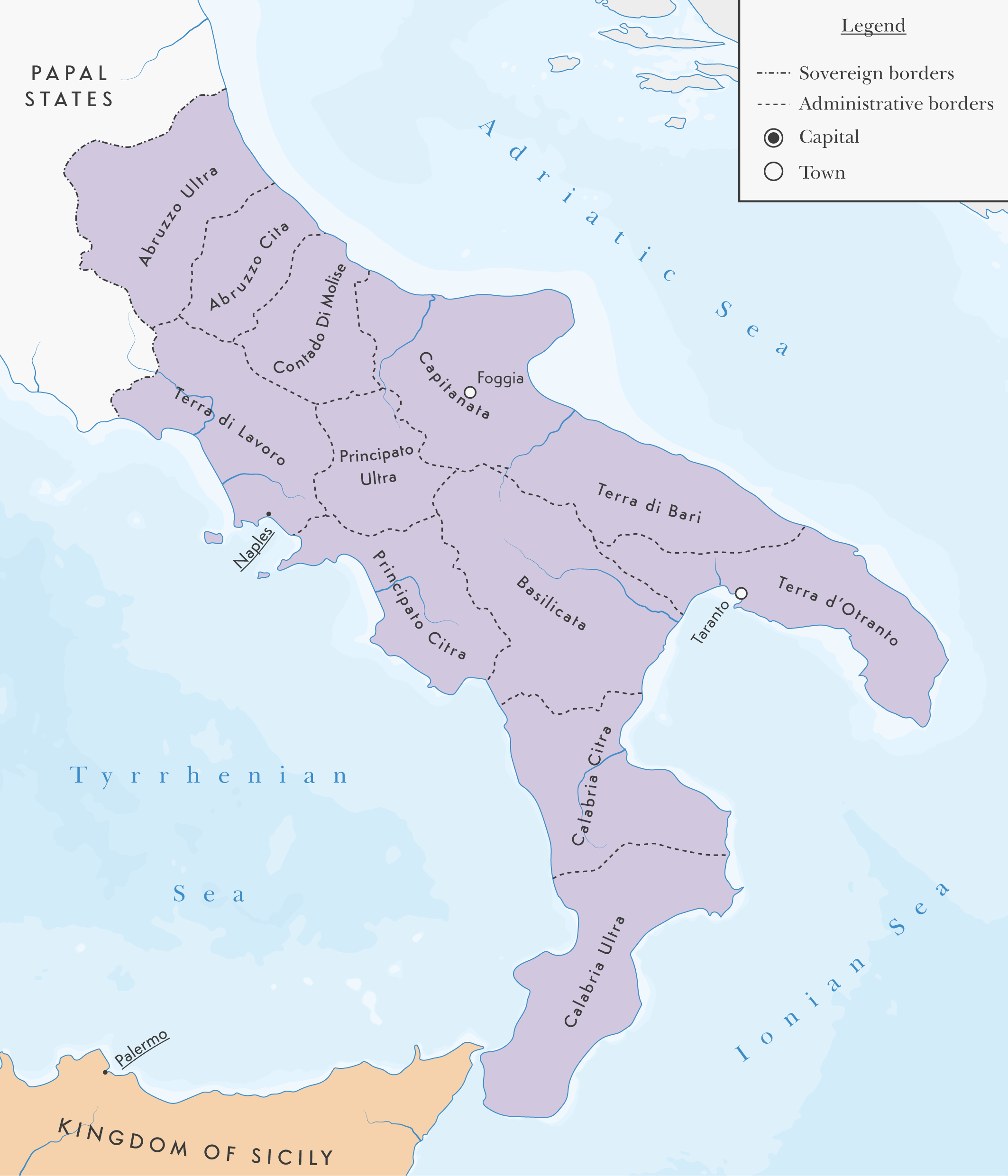
- Map of the Kingdom of Naples in 1454
Date	1435–1442
Location	Kingdom of Naples
Result	Aragonese victory
Territorial changes	Kingdom of Naples annexed by the Crown of Aragon

Belligerents
Crown of Aragon: Kingdom of Trinacria; Duchy of Milan (from 1435); Principality of Taranto (from 1437)	Kingdom of Naples: Principality of Taranto (until 1437); Republic of Genoa; Papal States; Duchy of Milan (until 1435); Republic of Florence

Commanders and leaders
(Crown of Aragon) Alfonso V of Aragon (Crown of Aragon) Ferdinand of Aragon (Crown of Aragon) Peter of Aragon † (Crown of Aragon) Francesco Piccinino (Crown of Aragon) Ramon de Boïl i Montagut (Duchy of Milan) Filippo Maria Visconti (from 1435); Giovanni Antonio del Balzo Orsini (from 1437)	Rene I of Naples; Antonio Caldora; Biagio Assereto (Papal States) Eugene IV (Papal States) Joan de Cornetto; Giovanni Antonio del Balzo Orsini (until 1437) (Duchy of Milan) Filippo Maria Visconti (until 1435)

The conquest of the Kingdom of Naples and its incorporation into the Crown of Aragon was carried out between 1435 and 1442 by King Alfonso V of Aragon.

== Background ==
After the War of the Sicilian Vespers which started in 1282, Sicily was split into the Angevin "Kingdom of Sicily" (Naples) and Aragonese "Kingdom of Trinacria" (Sicily) which was reinforced by the Treaty of Villeneuve in 1372. Alfonso V's permanent ambition was always the Kingdom of Naples, and the opportunity came in 1434 and 1435 with the successive deaths of Louis III of Naples and Queen Joanna II of Naples, while heir René of Anjou was a prisoner at the court of Philip III of Burgundy since his defeat at the Battle of Bulgnéville in 1431.

At the death of Louis III of Anjou, Queen Joana, who settled in Naples, found the support of the Duchy of Milan and the Papal States, irritated by the approach of Alfonso the Magnanimous to Amadeus VIII of Savoy and the Council of Basel, while the Republic of Florence and the Republic of Venice remained on the sidelines. Filippo Maria Visconti's ambassador in Gaeta, Ottolino Zoppo, warned him of the possibility that Alfonso V, who aspired to the Kingdom of Naples, would attack his port, and serve as a bridgehead for his ambitions, and Visconti sent Francesco Spinola with 800 men, of which 400 were crossbowmen, to defend the city

== Campaigns ==
At the death of Louis of Anjou, Alfonso was in Sicily after making expeditions against the island of Gerba (1432) and Tripoli (1434), he went against Gaeta and besieged by land and sea, and they began the work of expropriation by the besiegers, with the use of bombardments.

The Genoese, financially exhausted by the continuous wars of Duke Filippo Maria Visconti, made a last effort and armed a fleet of 12 ships, two ships, three galleys and a galleon with 2,400 men on board, and the navy was entrusted to Biagio Assereto. The expedition was conducted in secret and sailed past Recco and Portofino in a southerly direction, carefully preparing to face Aragon's numerically superior fleet of 31 ships. Assereto knew that Francesco Spinola had been wounded and that the resistance was at its lowest level.

Sure of victory, with a fleet that doubled the Genoese in number of ships, and of greater size, Alfonso V and many nobles accompanied the fleet, leaving behind Peter of Aragon with the galleys. The Genoese, who had only experienced sailors and soldiers, used the fog and set off fireworks, making the Catalans believe that they were dispersing, causing disorder in the Aragonese fleet, filled with people unaccustomed to fighting at sea, which made the task difficult for sailors and soldiers.

Alfonso V was defeated and taken prisoner together with the infants John and Henry and a good part of the Aragonese nobility, and only one ship was able to escape, causing 600 deaths and 5,000 prisoners sent by Filippo Maria Visconti to the duke of Milan and lord of Genoa. A ransom of 30,000 ducats was demanded, Maria of Castile summoned the Courts of Montsó to obtain funds to release them. The queen's mother, Eleanor of Alburquerque, died of grief at the imprisonment of her children shortly after hearing the news.

Alfonso V and the Duchy of Milan agreed to mutual support for the Treaty of Milan, in the demand for the throne of Naples and in the dispute against the Sforza and the Papacy. Alfonso was released in October. Milan's change of alliances revolted the Genoese at Christmas 1435, killing the Milanese governor.

Peter of Aragon, brother of Alfonso and who had escaped defeat, finally took Gaeta on March 25, 1435, where Alfonso entered on February 2, 1436, and the same year, to Terracina.

=== Conquest of Naples ===
Alfonso, who left Capua with the fleet, quickly took over most of the Kingdom of Naples and appointed the condottiero Francesco Piccinino as commander of his forces in the kingdom to fight against the Papal States. In 1437, the siege of Naples began from the Castel Nuovo and the Castel dell'Ovo, defended by Antonio Caldera, who resisted and had to lift the siege due to the attack of the papal forces in April 1437, commanded by Joan Vitellesco de Cornetto who besieged Capua where they met with those of Caldera, taking advantage of the fact that Alfonso had begun the siege of Aversa, which he had to raise to help Capua, and the Angevins retreated to Naples.

Vitellesco was defeated at the Battle of Volturno and Antonio Caldora at the Battle of Pescara by Andrea Matteo Acquaviva II, Francesco Piccinino and Sebastian d'Amicis, while Giovanni Antonio, Prince of Taranto was captured at the Battle of Montefusco by Cornetto, who took Avellino and L'Aquila. In 1437, the princes of Taranto and Caserta switched to the Angevin side, while Antonio Colonna, the prince of Salerno, switched to the Aragonese.

At the end of 1437 a truce was established until March 1438, which was broken by the Angevins on Christmas Day and shortly afterwards René of Anjou obtained the freedom of Philip III of Burgundy for 200,000 gold doubles, managing to strengthen Naples and focusing on consolidating Abruzzo to establish a base to attack the Catalans, and sending Caldora to Calabria, but he returned when his own possessions were attacked. Taking advantage of Renat's absence, Alfonso again laid siege to the capital, where in October 1438 infant Peter died, and the following summer the Castel Nuovo, which the Aragonese had preserved, had to surrender. But shortly afterwards, Alfonso occupied Salerno and Aversa, and defeated the Angevins at the battle of La Pelosa, and in January 1441 he conquered Benevento. At the end of that year he laid siege to Naples again and occupied Cosenza and Bisignano.

Alfonso became king of Naples, as he wished with the Aragonese victory at Naples on June 2, 1442. René of Anjou fled Naples with a galley, although Ramon de Boïl i Montagut still fought in Abruzzo against Francesco I Sforza.

==== Settlement with Pope Eugenius ====
Eugene IV and Alfonso the Magnanimous negotiated a settlement of their differences in the spring of 1443, resulting in a formal agreement at Terracina on 14 June 1443. Under the terms of this treaty, Eugene recognized Alfonso as king of Naples and of his son Ferdinand as successor, consolidating the conquest of the Kingdom of Naples, in exchange for the recognition of Eugene as pope, and withdrawing support for Amadeus VIII of Savoy and the Council of Basel.

== Aftermath ==
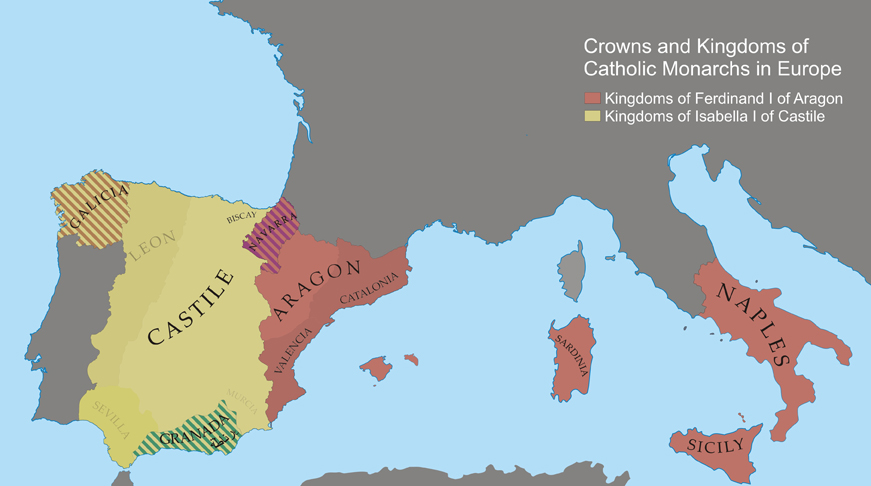
Crowns and kingdoms of the Catholic Monarchs in Europe (1500)

Converted into an Italian prince, with the death of Filippo Maria Visconti in 1447, Alfonso the Magnanimous soon after aspired to the succession as Duke of Milan, where the Ambrosian Republic was proclaimed, and participated in the alliances and subsequent struggles for the hegemony in Italy, which facilitated the penetration of the great powers in the peninsula. On one side fought Milan, ruled by Francesco I Sforza, and the Republic of Florence, behind which was the Kingdom of France, and on the other side, the Kingdom of Naples, the Republic of Venice and the Papal States.

Alfonso V, who continued to maintain aspirations over Corsica, continued the naval war with Genoa and to fight against the Ottomans, the Albanian captain Skanderbeg became Alfonso's vassal and in 1451 the Catalan Bernat Vaquer occupied the castle of Krujë and Ramon d'Ortafà was sent there as viceroy of Albania and later named viceroy of Albania, Greece and Slavonia, while Joan Claver became viceroy of Epirus and Morea. The crown of the Kingdom of Hungary was offered to him by John Hunyadi and other Hungarian magnates. Admiral Bernat I de Vilamarí occupied and fortified Kastellorizo, he operated at the mouth of the Nile and set fire to the enemy's ships there, launched himself on the coast of Syria and repeated the feat there. Joan de Nava, a Castilian sailor in Alfonso's service, made an effort to establish himself in Cyprus.

In all these efforts, neither Constantinople nor the Holy Land were forgotten. Constantinople was almost in the hands of the Turks; in order to mobilize a crusade, Alfonso sent ambassadors to Prester John (the negus of Ethiopia), to the emperor of Trebizond, John Komnenos, to Constantinople, Constantine XI Palaiologos, and to the khan of Beijing (1452). But Constantinople fell on May 29, 1453. After the disaster, Alfonso tried, however, to strengthen his penetration into the Balkans.

The Wars in Lombardy did not change the political map, but the fall of Constantinople in 1453 raised fears of an Ottoman threat to Italy and the Venetian territories in the Aegean, which led to the Treaty of Lodi between Milan and Venice in 1454, to which Florence and Naples later joined. The aim of the signatories, who were beginning to fear French hegemony, was to maintain the internal balance of the Italian peninsula.

== Bibliography ==
- Abulafia, David S. H. (2014). The Western Mediterranean Kingdoms: The Struggle for Dominion, 1200-1500. Routledge. ISBN 978-1317897415.
- Feliu de la Peña i Farell, Narcís (1709). Anales de Cataluña y epilogo breve de los progressos y famosos hechos de la nacion catalana (in Spanish). Vol. 2. Jaime Surià.
- Moisé, Filippo (1842). Storia dei dominii stranieri in Italia dalla caduta dell' impero romano in occidente fino ai nostri giorni (in Italian). V. Batelli.
- Rovira i Virgili, Antoni (1920). Història Nacional de Catalunya, volum VI. Edicions Pàtria.
- Soldevila i Zubiburu, Ferran (1963). Història de Catalunya (in Catalan). Vol. 1. Editorial Alpha. ISBN 978-84-7225-012-3.
