= Order of the Ship =

Secular order of knighthood

The Order of the Ship (French Ordre de la Nef) was a secular order of knighthood in the Kingdom of Naples founded and dedicated to the Holy Trinity by King Charles III of the House of Durazzo on 1 December 1381 and no longer active by 1386.

== History ==
Charles III was crowned King of Naples in the Castel Nuovo in Naples on 25 November. During the festivities that followed, he inducted seven or eight knights into a new order of his own creation at a ceremony in the great chapel of the Castel Nuovo on 1 December. In this he was probably imitating the founding of the Order of the Knot by King Louis I twenty years earlier on 25 May 1352, the same day as his coronation. Although there were present in Naples men who would have remembered the founding of the Order of the Knot, but it is unlikely that Charles sought to revive the Order of the Knot, defunct since Louis's death in 1362, since Louis's heirs were Charles's rivals for the throne.

The only contemporary evidence for the structure and history of the order are two copies of its statutes, both composed in Middle French. The original master copy of the statutes, the Livre de estatus et chapistrez, which was also in French and was to be kept in the order's chapel, is lost. It was probably richly illustrated in imitation of that of the Order of the Knot. The statutes themselves are modelled on those of the Order of the Knot and the Hungarian Order of Saint George, of which Charles was a member. The two manuscripts are MS French 83 in the Van Pelt Library of the University of Pennsylvania and MS L III 29 of the Biblioteca nazionale universitaria in Turin. According to the Pennsylvania manuscript, the order had eight original members (Charles and seven others), while the Turin manuscript lists eight knights besides Charles. Eight other men are recorded elsewhere as having been members of the order at some point, based largely on sepulchral inscriptions.

It is unlikely that the Order of the Ship was very active, since Charles III not only had to fight wars to keep his Neapolitan throne, but also laid claim to the Hungarian throne in 1382. He was assassinated in Hungary on 24 February 1386, leaving a child, Ladislaus, as his heir under the regency of his widow, Margaret. The Order of the Ship, if it was still active in any sense, died with Charles. During her regency, Margaret instituted a new order (compagnia) the device of which was a gold-embroidered spindle or capstan (argata) on a red field. There is no evidence that Ladislaus continued either his father's or his mother's order.

The first historian to write about the Order of the Ship was Pandolfo Collenuccio in his Compendio dell'Istoria del Regno di Napoli, first published at Venice in 1539 and printed again in 1541, 1552 and 1613. He believed that the ship after which the order was named was the Argo of Greek legend. José Micheli y Márquez, in his Tesoro militar de cavallería, published at Madrid in 1642, embellished Collenuccio's connection. He stated that the order was dedicated to Saint Nicholas of Myra and was known as the Order of the Argonauts of Saint Nicholas, adding that these medieval Argonauts, wearing the white habit, gathered annually on Saint Nicholas' Day (6 December) for a feast in the cathedral of Bari, which was dedicated to Nicholas. Micheli y Márquez is the main source for most of the false information that has spread about the order. The actual habit of the order, according to its statutes, was red and green.

== Members ==
The original companions of the order as listed in MS French 83, with Italian names in brackets:

- Charles de Duraz, i.e. Charles III, "prince and founder of the order" (prince et commenceur de l'ordre)
- Loys de Anguien
- Charles Rous de Monhaut de Calabre [Carlo Ruffo di Montalto]
- Jannot Prothojudice de Salerne [Giannotto Protogiudice]
- Gieffroy de Marsan
- Palamides Bochut de Naples
- Franchoys Guidace de Naples [Francischello Guindazzo]
- Bartholomé Tomacelle de Naples [Bartolomeo Tomacelli]

Additional companions named by MS L III 29:

- Thomas de Marsan [Tomasso di Marzano] (1 December 1381)
- Nichole d'Alemaigne (6 December 1381)

Each member bore the title Monsire (French 83) or Messire (L III 29).

== Sources ==
- Boulton, D'A. J. D. (1985). "The Middle French Statutes of the Monarchical Order of the Ship (Naples, 1381): A Critical Edition, with Introduction and Notes". Mediaeval Studies. 47: 168–271.
- Boulton, D'A. J. D. (2000). The Knights of the Crown: The Monarchical Orders of Knighthood in Later Medieval Europe (1325–1520). Boydell Press.
