= Mary of Lusignan, Queen of Naples =

Mary of Lusignan (1381 – 4 September 1404) was a queen consort of Naples, married to King Ladislaus of Naples.

She was born in Genoa. Mary was a daughter of James I of Cyprus and his queen consort Helvis of Brunswick-Grubenhagen.

On 12 February 1403, Mary married Ladislaus of Naples. He had divorced his previous wife, Constance of Clermont, in 1392 while struggling for the throne against Louis II of Naples. He had no legitimate heirs of his own.

Mary died childless in Naples the following year. Ladislaus went on to marry Mary of Enghien.

Royal titles
Preceded by Costanza Chiaramonte	Queen consort of Naples; 12 February 1403 – 4 September 1404	Succeeded by Mary of Enghien
