= Goffredo Marzano =

Goffredo Marzano may refer to:

- Goffredo Marzano, Count of Squillace (1300–1362), grand admiral of Naples
- Goffredo Marzano, Count of Alife (c. 1350 – after 1404), grand chamberlain of Naples
