= Charles of Naples =

Charles of Naples may refer to:

- Charles I of Naples (r. 1282–1285)
- Charles II of Naples (r. 1285–1309)
- Charles III of Naples (r. 1382–1386)
- Charles IV of Naples (r. 1516–1554), also king of Spain and Sicily and Holy Roman emperor
- Charles V of Naples (r. 1665–1700), also king of Spain and Sicily
- Charles VI of Naples (r. 1713–1734), also king of Sicily and Holy Roman emperor
- Charles VII of Naples (r. 1734–1759), also king of Spain and Sicily
