= Charles III of Anjou =

Charles III of Anjou may refer to:

- Charles, Count of Valois (1270–1325), French prince and nobleman, married into the House of Anjou in 1290
- Charles III of Naples (1382–1386) and Hungary (1385–1386), King of Naples, born into the Capetian House of Anjou in 1345
