= House of Valois-Anjou =

Cadet branch of the House of Valois

- Arms of the Dukes of Anjou
- Parent house: House of Valois (male line); Capetian House of Anjou (female line)
- Country: Holy Roman Empire; Kingdom of France; Kingdom of Naples
- Founded: 1356; 670 years ago
- Founder: Louis I, Duc d'Anjou
- Final ruler: Charles IV, Duc d'Anjou
- Titles: King of Naples; Duke of Anjou; Duke of Lorraine; Duke of Bar; Count of Provence
- Styles: "Majesty" "Grace"
- Estates: Château d'Angers (seat); Château de Baugé; Reggia di Quisisana (seat in Naples)
- Dissolution: 1481; 545 years ago
- Deposition: 1442 (Aragonese conquest of Naples)

The House of Valois-Anjou (French: Maison de Valois-Anjou, Italian: Casa Valois-Angiò) was a noble French family and a cadet branch of the House of Valois. Members of the house served as rulers of the Duchy of Anjou in the Kingdom of France, the County of Provence in the Holy Roman Empire, and also as monarchs of the Kingdom of Naples, as well as lords of several other territories.

== History ==
Possessions of the House of Valois-Anjou (in darker blue: Anjou, Maine, Provence) in the second half of the 15th century

The house was founded in during the reign of king John II of France (1350–1364), the second monarch in the Valois line of House of Capet. His paternal grandmother, countess Margaret of Anjou and Maine (d. 1299), had been a princess of the Capetian House of Anjou. She was the eldest daughter of King Charles II of Naples and married Charles, Count of Valois, thus bringing the County of Anjou to their son, future king Philip VI of France (1328–1350). In 1356, Philip's son and heir, king John II, gave the County of Anjou to his son Louis, who thus became the founder of the House of Valois-Anjou.

By 1380, Louis' cousin Joanna I, queen of Naples and countess of Provence, also of the senior Angevin line, realized that she would remain childless. Although she had close cousins from the senior Angevin line, Joanna decided to adopt her distant cousin Louis of Anjou as her heir, both in Naples and Provence. The adoption was proclaimed on 29 June 1380, provoking the negative reaction from the senior Angevin line, who supported prince Charles from the cadet line of Anjou-Durazzo.

Thus, the two Angevin pretenders, Louis and Charles, now began to contest with each other for the possessions of the Kingdom of Naples and the County of Provence. Charles was initially successful in securing control of Naples (1381–1382), while Louis tried to secure Provence, but was faced with resistance by the Union of Aix. In spite of that, Louis invaded Naples and took several regions of the Kingdom, but was not able to defeat Charles and died there in 1384.

Louis' claims were inherited by his son Louis II of Anjou, who was still a boy, and thus under the regency of his mother Marie of Blois who managed to secure the County of Provence for her son. In 1387, armies of Louis II entered Naples, but could not capture the entire Kingdom, since the crown was also claimed by Ladislaus of Naples. In 1389, Louis II was crowned king of Naples by the Pope, in Avignon, and in 1390 the young king came to Naples, continuing to fight until 1399, when Ladislaus took Naples.

The extinction of the House of Anjou-Durazzo in 1435 temporarily secured Naples for the Valois House of Anjou, with son of Louis II, duke René of Anjou becoming the King of Naples, but in 1442 he was driven from Naples by king Alfonso V of Aragon.

Duke René of Anjou died in 1480, and was succeeded by his nephew, duke Charles IV of Anjou, who died already in 1481 without male heirs. Thus, the Duchy of Anjou reverted to the French crown, while the County of Provence was passed, under special provisions, to the French royal House of Valois.

The Valois-Angevin pretensions to the throne of Naples were continued intermittently by the House of Lorraine, which descended from René's eldest daughter, Yolande. Notably, the Valois-Habsburg War of 1551 to 1559 saw Duke Francis of Guise, a member of a cadet branch of the House of Lorraine, lead an unsuccessful French expedition against Naples.

Arms before 1384

Arms between 1384 and 1481

== See also ==
- Angevin Empire
- Capetian House of Anjou
- House of Bourbon-Anjou
- Duchy of Anjou
- County of Maine
- County of Provence
- Kingdom of Naples

== Sources ==
- Cope, Christopher (1986). Phoenix Frustrated: The Lost Kingdom of Burgundy. London: Constable.
- Davies, Norman (2011). Vanished Kingdoms: The History of Half-Forgotten Europe. London: Penguin.
- Kibler, William W.; Zinn, Grover A., eds. (2011) [1995]. Medieval France: An Encyclopedia. New York and London: Routledge.
- Parker, Geoffrey (2019). Emperor: A New Life of Charles V. New Haven and London: Yale University Press.
- Potter, David L. (1995). A History of France, 1460–1560: The Emergence of a Nation. Basingstoke: Macmillan.
- Rollo-Koster, Joëlle (2022). The Great Western Schism, 1378-1417: Performing Legitimacy, Performing Unity. Cambridge: Cambridge University Press.
- Saenger, Paul (1977). "Burgundy and the Inalienability of Appanages in the Reign of Louis XI". French Historical Studies. 10 (1): 1–26.
- Wilson, Peter (2016). Heart of Europe: A History of the Holy Roman Empire. Cambridge: Harvard University Press.
