= List of Neapolitan monarchs =

List of the monarchs of Naples

Coat of arms of the Kingdom of the Two Sicilies.

The following is a list of rulers of the Kingdom of Naples, from its first separation from the Kingdom of Sicily to its merger with the same into the Kingdom of the Two Sicilies.

== Kingdom of Naples (1282–1501) ==
=== House of Anjou ===
In 1382, the Kingdom of Naples was inherited by Charles of Durazzo, King of Hungary, great grandson of King Charles II of Naples. After this, the House of Anjou of Naples was renamed House of Anjou-Durazzo, when Charles married his first cousin Margaret of Durazzo, member of a prominent Neapolitan noble family.

Portrait	Coat of Arms	Name	Reign		Claim to the throne	Title
		Charles I (Carlo I)	30 March 1282	7 January 1285	• Conquered the Kingdom of Sicily from Manfred as a part of the war between the Hohenstaufen dynasty & the Papacy • Following the Sicilian Vespers in 1282, the island of Sicily was lost to Peter III of Aragon	King of Sicily, Naples and Albania (Re di Sicilia, Napoli e Albania)
		Charles II, the Lame (Carlo II, lo Zoppo)	7 January 1285	5 May 1309	• Son of Charles I	King of Naples (Re di Napoli)
		Robert, the Wise (Roberto, il Saggio)	5 May 1309	20 January 1343	• Son of Charles II	King of Naples (Re di Napoli)
		Joanna I (Giovanna I)	20 January 1343	12 May 1382	• Granddaughter of Robert I	Queen of Naples (Regina di Napoli)
		Louis I (Luigi I)	18 August 1348	26 May 1362	• Husband of Joanna I • Grandson of Charles II; member of the House of Anjou-Taranto • Potential claimant to the throne through the male line if Joanna died childless, but he and his line also died out.	Jure uxoris King of Naples (Re di Napoli)
After Joanna's death without legitimate issue, the heirs were her nieces, only one (Margaret) of whom left issue (with Charles, a member of the Durazzo branch of the House of Anjou). The next ones in line were the Durazzo branch itself (the Taranto branch, of which Louis I was part, had been extinguished), whose prominent figure, Charles, was Joanna's enemy.
		Charles III, the Short (Carlo III, il Breve)	12 May 1382	24 February 1386	• Great-grandson of Charles II and second cousin of Joanna I of Naples • Member of the House of Anjou-Durazzo	King of Naples (Re di Napoli)
		Ladislaus, the Magnanimous (Ladislao, il Magnanimo)	24 February 1386	Early 1390	• Son of Charles III	King of Naples (Re di Napoli)

=== House of Valois-Anjou (disputed) ===
Joanna of Naples had refused to name her enemy Charles of Durazzo as heir to the Neapolitan throne despite him ending up succeeding her anyway. If Charles' line was ignored, the subsequent heirs would be the descendants of Margaret, Countess of Anjou, a daughter of Charles II of Naples; the line pointed to the kings of France of the House of Valois. Joanna chose this line, though she named as heir, her second cousin once removed, Louis of Valois-Anjou, the second son of King John II of France, in order to avoid a personal union with France.

As Charles III had already seized the Neapolitan throne, initially the House of Valois-Anjou only had an empty claim. One of their members, Louis II, succeeded in ruling Naples for a time.

Time as claimant instead of actual rule will be shown in italic.

Portrait	Coat of Arms	Name	Reign		Relationship with Predecessor(s)	Title
		Louis I of Anjou (Luigi I)	1382	1384	• Adopted son and heir of Joanna I • Great-great-grandson of Charles II through female line • Could not establish himself in Naples before his death	King of Naples (Re di Napoli)
		Louis II (Luigi II)	1384; 1389	1417; 1399	• Son of Louis I (adopted son of Joanna I) • Crowned in 1389 • Actually ruled in Naples only from 1390 until 1399	King of Naples (Re di Napoli)
		Louis III of Anjou (Luigi III)	1417	1434	• Son of Louis II • He was recognised as Joanna II's heir in 1423.	King of Naples (Re di Napoli)

=== House of Anjou (restored) ===
Portrait	Coat of Arms	Name	Reign		Relationship with Predecessor(s)	Title
		Ladislaus, the Magnanimous (Ladislao I, il Magnanimo)	Late 1399	6 August 1414	• Son of Charles III	King of Naples (Re di Napoli)
		Joanna II (Giovanna II)	6 August 1414	2 February 1435	• Daughter of Charles III	Queen of Naples (Regina di Napoli)

=== House of Valois-Anjou (restored) ===
Joanna II recognised Louis III of Anjou as heir in 1423, however he died in 1434 before succeeding to the throne. His brother René of Anjou succeeded to the claim and became king upon Joanna's death in 1435.

Portrait	Coat of Arms	Name	Reign		Relationship with Predecessor(s)	Title
		René, the Good (Renato, il Buono)	2 February 1435	2 June 1442	• Son of Louis II	King of Naples (Re di Napoli)

=== House of Trastámara ===
Before Louis of Anjou, Queen Joanna II's adopted heir had been Alfonso V of Aragon. His father, Ferdinand I of Aragon had inherited both Aragon and Sicily from his maternal uncle Martin I of Aragon. Martin, in turn had claimed the throne of Sicily following the extinction of the Sicilian branch of the House of Barcelona, thereby bringing Sicily under the Aragonese crown. Alfonso refused to be disinherited and conquered Naples from René of Anjou in 1442. Although both Sicily and Naples were once again under the rule of the single monarch since the Sicilian Vespers, Alfonso passed the Aragonese throne (including Sicily) to his brother John, while Naples went to his illegitimate son Ferdinand.

Portrait	Coat of Arms	Name	Reign		Relationship with Predecessor(s)	Title
		Alfonso I, the Magnanimous (Alfonso I, il Magnanimo)	2 June 1442	27 June 1458	• Adopted son of Joanna II; conquered	King of Aragon, Sicily and Naples (Re di Aragona, Sicilia e Napoli)
		Ferdinand I (Ferdinando I)	27 June 1458	25 January 1494	• Illegitimate son of Alfonso I	King of Naples (Re di Napoli)
		Alfonso II (Alfonso II)	25 January 1494	23 January 1495	• Son of Ferdinand I	King of Naples (Re di Napoli)
		Ferdinand II (Ferdinando II)	23 January 1495	7 September 1496	• Son of Alfonso II	King of Naples (Re di Napoli)
		Frederick (Federico)	7 September 1496	1 August 1501	• Son of Ferdinand I	King of Naples (Re di Napoli)

== Union with France (1501–1504) ==
Upon his death in 1480, René of Anjou transferred his claim to his nephew, Charles IV, Duke of Anjou. Charles died in 1481 and willed his claim to Louis XI of France. Louis' son Charles VIII attempted to take Naples by force, but failed and died childless in 1498.

Charles VIII was succeeded by his 2nd cousin once removed Louis XII. Louis had no claim to the Neapolitan throne, but as successor to Charles VIII in France he nevertheless wanted to succeed him in Naples as well.

Naples was conquered in 1501 and became part of a personal union with the Kingdom of France. The local government was ruled by a French viceroy.

=== House of Valois-Orléans ===
Portrait	Coat of Arms	Name	Reign		Relationship with Predecessor(s)	Title
		Louis III (Luigi III)	2 August 1501	31 January 1504	• Succeeded to Charles VIII on the French throne; conquered Naples	

== Union with Spain (1504–1647) ==
Ferdinand II of Aragon won Naples from France in the Treaty of Granada. Naples thus entered a personal union with the Crown of Aragon, which lasted for over two centuries. The Crown of Aragon and the Crown of Castile were also in personal union, which eventually became the Kingdom of Spain under the Bourbon Dynasty. The kings of Spain appointed Spanish viceroys to govern Naples for them. The royal houses were:

- House of Trastámara (1504–1516)
- House of Habsburg (1516–1647)

=== House of Trastámara ===
Portrait	Coat of Arms	Name	Reign		Relationship with Predecessor(s)	Title
		Ferdinand III (Ferdinando III)	31 January 1504	23 January 1516	• Conquered Naples from Louis XII	
		Joanna III (Giovanna III)	23 January 1516	12 April 1555	• Daughter of Ferdinand III	

Joanna III was kept confined under alleged insanity during her whole reign.

=== House of Habsburg ===
Portrait	Coat of Arms	Name	Reign		Relationship with Predecessor(s)	Title
		Charles IV (Carlo IV)	14 March 1516	25 July 1554	• Son of Joanna III	
		Philip I	25 July 1554	13 September 1598	• Son of Charles IV	
		Philip II	13 September 1598	31 March 1621	• Son of Philip I	
		Philip III	31 March 1621	1647	• Son of Philip II	

== Neapolitan Republic (1647–1648) ==
=== House of Guise ===
Officially a Republic, Naples was governed for a short time by the Duke of Guise, under the title of "Doge of Naples".

Portrait	Coat of Arms	Name	Reign		Relationship with Predecessor(s)	Title
		Henry of Guise (Enrico di Guisa)	22 October 1647	5 April 1648	• Claimed a lineage with the House of Valois-Anjou	Doge of Naples (Doge di Napoli)

== Union with Spain (1648–1713) ==
Naples returned to its former status; in personal union with the Crown of Aragon and the Spanish monarchy.

=== House of Habsburg ===
Portrait	Coat of Arms	Name	Reign		Relationship with Predecessor(s)	Title
		Philip III	1648	17 September 1665	• Son of Philip II	
		Charles V	17 September 1665	1 November 1700	• Son of Philip III	

=== House of Bourbon ===
Portrait	Coat of Arms	Name	Reign		Relationship with Predecessor(s)	Title
		Philip IV	1 November 1700	11 April 1713	• Great-nephew of Charles V	

== Kingdom of Naples (1713–1799) ==
Under the terms of the Peace of Utrecht the crown of Naples passed to the Austrian Habsburgs.

=== House of Habsburg ===
Portrait	Coat of Arms	Name	Reign		Relationship with Predecessor(s)	Title
		Charles VI	11 April 1713	1734/1735	• Great-grandson of Philip II	

=== House of Bourbon ===
In 1734 Spanish troops conquered the Kingdom of Naples, which was surrendered to Charles of Bourbon under the Treaty of Vienna (1738).

Portrait	Coat of Arms	Name	Reign		Relationship with Predecessor(s)	Title
		Charles VII (Carlo VII)	2 June 1734	6 October 1759	• Son of Philip IV; confirmed King with a treaty (1738). Abdicated, 1759 to assume the throne of Spain.	King of Spain, Naples and Sicily (Re di Spagna, Napoli e Sicilia)
		Ferdinand IV (Ferdinando IV)	6 October 1759	23 January 1799	• Son of Charles VII	King of Naples and Sicily (Re di Napoli e Sicilia)

== Parthenopean Republic (1799) ==
=== Dictators ===
Nº	Portrait	Name (Birth–Death)	Term of Office		Political Party	Ref.
1		Jean Étienne Championnet (1762–1800)	21 January 1799	24 February 1799	Military	
1		Jean Étienne Championnet (1762–1800)	Championnet was appointed to defend the Roman Republic, but despite the French Directory's directives, he also conquered Naples and created the Parthenopean Republic. After a short dictatorship, he was deposed and imprisoned by France itself.			
2		Étienne Macdonald (1765–1840)	24 February 1799	3 June 1799	Military	
2		Étienne Macdonald (1765–1840)	After Championnet's deposition, MacDonald ruled Naples for some months, before moving his forces in Northern Italy. Naples was then reconquered by the Bourbons' loyalists.			

== Kingdom of Naples (1799–1816) ==
=== House of Bourbon-Two Sicilies ===
Portrait	Coat of Arms	Name	Reign		Relationship with Predecessor(s)	Title
		Ferdinand IV (Ferdinando IV)	13 June 1799	30 March 1806	• Son of Charles VII	King of Naples and Sicily (Re di Napoli e Sicilia)

=== House of Bonaparte ===
Portrait	Coat of Arms	Name	Reign		Relationship with Predecessor(s)	Title
		Joseph I (Giuseppe I)	30 March 1806	8 July 1808	• Appointed by Napoleon I of France, abdicated 1808 to assume the throne of Spain.	King of Naples (Re di Napoli)

=== House of Murat ===
Portrait	Coat of Arms	Name	Reign		Relationship with Predecessor(s)	Title
		Joachim-Napoleon (Gioacchino Napoleone)	1 August 1808	22 May 1815	• Brother-in-law of Joseph I	King of Naples (Re di Napoli)

=== House of Bourbon-Two Sicilies ===
Portrait	Coat of Arms	Name	Reign		Relationship with Predecessor(s)	Title
		Ferdinand IV (Ferdinando IV)	22 May 1815	8 December 1816	• Son of Charles VII	King of Naples and Sicily (Re di Napoli e Sicilia)

Naples was merged with Sicily to form Kingdom of the Two Sicilies.

== See also ==
- List of monarchs of the Kingdom of the Two Sicilies
- List of consorts of Naples
- List of viceroys of Naples
- List of monarchs of Sicily
- Kings of Naples family tree
