= Biagio Assereto =

Italian admiral

Biagio Assereto (c. 1383 – 25 April 1456) was an Italian admiral at the service of the Republic of Genoa.

== Biography ==
He was born at Recco, the son of a smith. He was noticed by Francesco Spinola, lord of the city, who took him as a page. In 1423 he moved to Genoa starting a military career. As a naval commander of the Republic, he led a fleet to help Joan II of Naples (1425), captured the Florentine Ferruccio Verro (1426) and pushed back Domenico Campofregoso and his Florentine allies (September 1427). In 1435 he led a small fleet to Gaeta at the rescue of Francesco Spinola, besieged by Alfonso V of Aragon, and was victorious in the following Battle of Ponza.

Despite his refusal to continue due war, due to the lack of troops to invade the Neapolitan mainland, he received the fief of Serravalle Scrivia and, by the Genoese ally Filippo Maria Visconti, the position of governor of Milan. Later he was ducal commissar in Parma and commander of the Milanese army in the war against Venice. At Casalmaggiore he defeated the Venetian admiral Andrea Quirini (July 1448). He later served Francesco Sforza (1450) but, two years later, he abandoned any public position and retreated at Serravalle to devote to literature. His friends included Enea Silvio Piccolomini, the future pope Pius II.

He died at Serravalle in 1456.

== Sources ==
- Balbi, Giovanna (1962). "Uomini d'arme e di cultura nel Quattrocento genovese: Biagio Assereto". Atti della Società Ligure di Storia Patria. pp. 97–206.
