= Costanza Chiaramonte =

Queen consort of Naples in 1389–1392

Costanza Chiaramonte (c. 1377 – 1423) was a queen consort of Naples in 1389–1392, married to King Ladislaus of Naples. With changing political circumstances, their marriage was annulled.

== Life ==
Costanza was a daughter of Manfredi III Chiaramonte, count of Modica and Malta, and a powerful figure in Palermo.

=== Queen ===
Her marriage to King Ladislaus, took place celebrated in Gaeta in 1389 when she was 12, was calculated to bring her family's financial and military support, and not adversity, to his rule.

The fortunes of the Chiaramonte family changed after her father died in 1391, and her brother was caught and executed by the forces of King Martin of Aragon, who had declared himself king of Sicily. With this turn of fortunes, Ladislaus obtained an annulment by decree of the pope Boniface IX. In July 1392, the bishop of Gaeta and Cardinal Acciaioli announced the dissolution of the marriage in church. The supposed reason for the annulment was either the age of the couple or the accusation that Costanza's mother was living dissolutely in concubinage.

=== Later life ===
The following year Constance was forced to marry the count of Altavilla, Andrea di Capua, son of Bartolomeo, and protonotary of the kingdom, who was residing in the Palazzo Marigliano, Naples. At the public wedding ceremony, Costanza was said to have proclaimed to her groom that he should take pride in having the king's wife and queen as his concubine.

== Legacy ==
Constanza's fate attracted later storytellers and songwriters. Even in the 20th century, it was pointed as an example of ecclesiastical hypocrisy over the sanctity of marriage.

Preceded by Margaret of Durazzo	Queen Consort of Naples; 1389 – 1392	Succeeded by Mary of Lusignan
