= Louis II of Anjou =

King of Naples (1377-1417)

Louis II
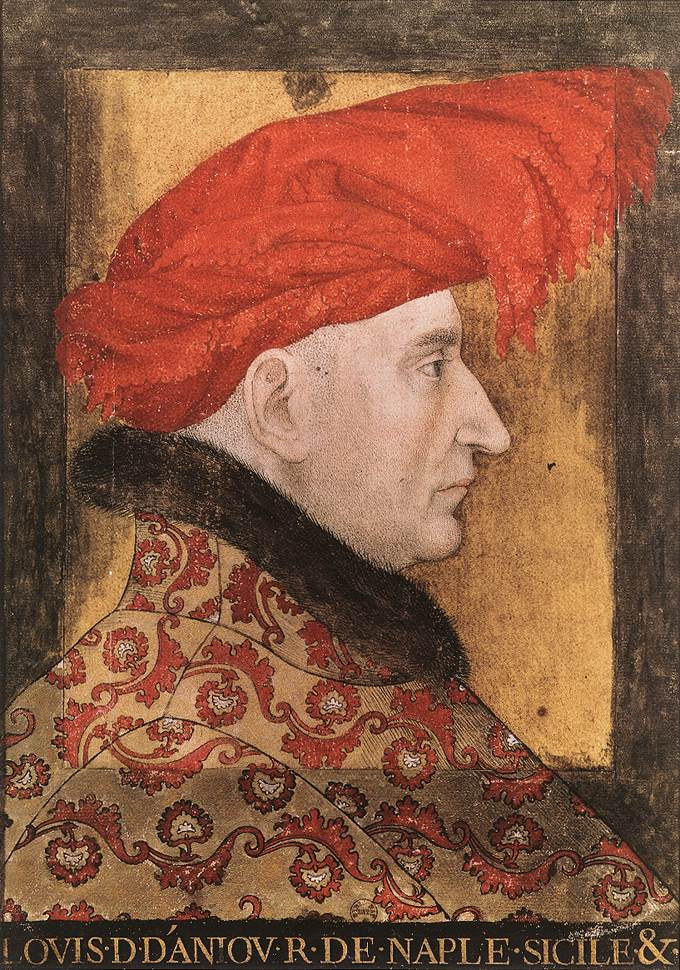
- Portrait of Louis II by Barthélemy d'Eyck, c. 1456–1465

King of Naples
- Reign: 1389–1399
- Coronation: 1 November 1389
- Predecessor: Ladislaus
- Successor: Ladislaus
- Contender: Ladislaus (1389–1399)

Duke of Anjou
- Reign: 1384–1417
- Predecessor: Louis I
- Successor: Louis III
- Born: 5 October 1377; Toulouse
- Died: 29 April 1417 (aged 39); Château d'Angers, Anjou
- Spouse: Yolande of Aragon (m. 1400)
- Issue: Louis III, Duke of Anjou; René, King of Naples; Charles, Count of Maine; Marie, Queen of France; Yolande, Countess of Montfort
- House: Valois-Anjou
- Father: Louis I of Anjou
- Mother: Marie of Blois

Louis II (5 October 1377 – 29 April 1417) was Duke of Anjou and Count of Provence from 1384 to 1417; he claimed the Kingdom of Naples, but only ruled parts of the kingdom from 1390 to 1399. His father, Louis I of Anjou—the founder of the House of Valois-Anjou—was a younger son of King John II of France and the adopted son of Queen Joanna I of Naples. When his father died during a military campaign in Naples in 1384, Louis II was still a child. He inherited Anjou from his father, but his mother, Marie of Blois, could not convince his uncles, John, Duke of Berry and Philip II, Duke of Burgundy, to continue her husband's war for Naples. The Provençal nobles and towns refused to acknowledge Louis II as their lawful ruler, but Marie of Blois persuaded them one after another to swear fealty to him between 1385 and 1387.

His cousin, King Charles VI of France, decided to support Louis II's bid for Naples in 1389. After Antipope Clement VII crowned him king in Avignon on 1 November 1389, Louis II moved to Naples. His troops could not occupy the whole kingdom, thus it was practically divided between Louis II and his opponent, Ladislaus of Naples. The conflict between Clement VII's successor, Antipope Benedict XIII, and France weakened Louis' position and Ladislaus forced him to leave Naples for Provence in 1399.

== Early life ==
Louis was the elder of the two sons of Louis I of Anjou and Marie of Blois. Louis I was a younger son of King John II of France who granted Anjou and Maine to him as hereditary appanage in 1360. The childless Queen Joanna I of Naples adopted Louis I as her son and heir in 1380, because she needed French support against her rival, Charles of Durazzo. The rulers of Naples had acknowledged the popes' suzerainty since 1130, but two rival popes were competing for the supreme authority after the Western Schism of 1378. Joanna's subjects regarded Urban VI as the lawful pope, but she preferred Urban's opponent, Clement VII. In retaliation, Pope Urban confirmed Charles' claim to her realms and crowned him king of Naples (formally, king of Sicily) in Rome in June 1381. Charles of Durazzo invaded southern Italy, but Louis I could not leave France to protect his adoptive mother, because his brother, King Charles V of France had recently died. Charles of Durazzo captured Queen Joanna and occupied Naples in September.

Louis I was determined to seize her inheritance, which included the counties of Provence and Forcalquier and a claim to the Kingdom of Jerusalem in addition to Naples. The earliest plans about Louis' marriage were related to his father's search for allies against Charles of Durazzo. In November 1381, Louis I was planning to forge an alliance with Aragon through the marriage of Louis and Louis' younger brother, Charles, with King Peter IV of Aragon's granddaughters, Joanna and Yolande. The plan was soon set aside, because Louis I realized that an alliance with a powerful Italian ruler could serve his purposes. After in early 1382 he decided to launch a military campaign against Charles of Durazzo, he started negotiations with Bernabò Visconti, Lord of Milan. Bernabò agreed to hire troops to fight against Charles of Durazzo and engaged his daughter, Lucia, to Louis on 13 March 1382.

Louis I had meanwhile come to Avignon where Antipope Clement VII crowned him king. He took possession of Provence and Forcalquier, allowing his mercenaries to freely loot the two counties. His military campaign decided Queen Joanna's fate, because Charles of Durazzo ordered her jailers to smother her in July. Louis I crossed the borders of the Kingdom of Naples in September, but Charles of Durazzo avoid to give a pitched battle. Louis I's most mercenaries deserted by the end of 1382, forcing him to offer to abandon his claim to Naples in return for Provence, but Charles of Durazzo rejected his offer. The seven-year-old Louis, who was staying in Anjou, sent a ring to Lucia Visconti to Milan in token of their engagement on 6 May 1384. He was styled as Duke of Calabria in the letter.

Louis I died in Bari on 20 September 1384. In his last will, he asked Clement VII to support his son to seize the Kingdom of Naples. He appointed Enguerrand VII of Coucy to administer the occupied parts of the kingdom as viceroy, stipulating that his widow could only remove Coucy with the consent of his brothers (John, Duke of Berry and Philip II, Duke of Burgundy) and their nephew, King Charles VI of France.

== Reign ==
=== Minority ===
Louis was only seven when his father died. His mother tried to persuade Louis' uncles Philip II of Burgundy and John of Berry to continue the military campaign against Naples. Bernabò Visconti supported her efforts, but both dukes refused to spend more money on the unsuccessful enterprise. The Duke of Burgundy clearly stated that "all these little ventures" should be forgotten. Bernabò Visconti was arrested by his nephew Gian Galeazzo Visconti on 6 May 1385, which put an end to negotiations about the marriage of his daughter and Louis.

Most towns and noblemen supported Charles of Durazzo in Provence and Forcelquier. They entered into a formal alliance against Louis and his mother in Aix-en-Provence. Marie, who was determined to restore their rule in the two wealthy counties, hurried to Marseille. Louis accompanied his mother and they jointly received the oaths of fealty of the three highest-ranking magistrates of the town on 24 August 1385. In return, they ceremoniously pledged that they would always observe the burghers' liberties. Marie entered into negotiations with the members of the League of Aix and persuaded them one by one to accept Louis' rule during the following two years.

Charles of Durazzo fell victim to a plot while laying claim to Hungary in February 1386. His ten-year-old son, Ladislaus, succeeded him under the guardianship of his mother, Margaret of Durazzo. Urban VI's successor, Pope Boniface IX, confirmed Ladislaus' right to rule the Kingdom of Naples. Marie of Blois started negotiations about Louis' marriage with Ladislaus' sister, Joanna, but Louis flatly refused to marry the daughter of his father's principal enemy in May 1387. Louis' supporters took possession of the town of Naples, but his adversaries were able to retain the two most important fortresses, the Castel Nuovo and Castel Sant'Elmo.

Charles VI of France reached the age of majority, dismissed the dukes of Burgundy and Berry and decided to provide support to Louis. He knighted Louis and his brother, Charles, at Saint-Denis Abbey in Paris in May 1389. The celebrations which lasted for a week were "carefully stage-managed propaganda for the royal house, deliberately contrived to show its fortunes in the hands of a younger generation", according to historian Jonathan Sumption. He promised to grant 300,000 florins to Louis to finance a military campaign to southern Italy. (Anti)pope Clement VII soon promised to pay further 500,000 florins to Louis. Charles VI announced his decision to the burghers of Naples in a letter that was read out in the Naples Cathedral soon after the ritual liquefaction of the blood of Saint Januarius.

=== Naples ===
Antipope Clement VII crowned Louis king in the chapel of the Popes' Palace in Avignon on 1 November 1389. Charles VI of France and his younger brother, Louis of Touraine, were also present at the ceremony, demonstrating their support to Louis. Gian Galeazzo Visconti also joined their alliance.

Louis and his fleet of about 40 galleys sailed from Marseille in July 1390 and reached the Bay of Naples on 6 August. His troops captured the Castel Sant'Elmo in October, and the Castel Nuovo weeks later. Clement VII's legate, Cardinal Pierre de Thury, who had accompanied Louis to Naples, administered the kingdom efficiently on his behalf. Louis was engaged to King John I of Aragon's daughter, Yolande. Clement VII provided regular financial support to Louis whose troops achieved a series of major victories and captured Amalfi and Ravello in 1392. Most Calabrian barons (including the heads of the powerful Sanseverino and Ruffo families) also swore fealty to him by the autumn of 1392. In practice, the Kingdom of Naples was divided between Louis and Ladislaus.

Charles VI of France showed the first symptoms of madness on 5 August 1392, which enabled Duke Philip II of Burgundy to strengthen his position at the French royal court. In November, Visconti sent an envoy to Paris to persuade the French to launch further military campaigns to Italy. Louis of Turenne, who had received the Duchy of Orléans from Charles VI, supported the plan, because he wanted to conquer large parts of the Papal States for himself; his maternal uncle, Louis II, Duke of Bourbon, also decided to lead a French army to Naples to support Louis. However, negotiations with their potential Italian allies and Clement VII proved that their goals could hardly be achieved, because of the lack of sufficient financial support.

Clement VII died unexpectedly in Avignon on 16 September 1394. Charles VI and his counsellors wanted to put an end to the schism and asked Clement VII's cardinals not to elect a new pope. The cardinals ignored their request and elected an Aragonese cardinal who took the name Benedict XIII. Louis supported Benedict, but the French prelates decided to enforce the abdication of both popes at their general assembly in Paris on 2 February 1395. Louis I, Duke of Orléans was determined to continue the military operations in Italy, but Charles VI's wife, Queen Isabeau of Bavaria, and Duke Philip II of Burgundy convinced him to withdraw his troops from Italy in late February.

The conflict between France and Benedict XIII weakened Louis' position and Ladislaus could take advantage of his difficulties. When analysing their situation, historian Alan Ryder concludes that Louis revealed a "character devoid of leadership" and Ladislaus displayed that "acumen and ruthlessness which were to make him the terror of Italy". Louis' real authority was restricted to the city of Naples, because the Calabrian barons only formally acknowledged his rule. Charles VI of France openly abandoned Louis' case when he signed a treaty with Florence, promising not to intervene in Naples.

The French clergy withdrew from the obedience to Benedict XIII and a French army laid siege to Avignon in July 1398. The legitimacy of Louis's rule in Naples derived from his coronation by Benedict XIII's predecessor, but his mother who administered Provence was to support the French action. Deprived of his revenues from France, Benedict XIII was no more able to finance Louis's troops in Naples. The Apulian barons rose up against Louis, forcing him to launch a military campaign to Apulia in February 1399. The Sanseverini abandoned him and his absence from Naples enabled Ladislaus to seize the town on 10 July. Louis could not continue the fight and left southern Italy for Provence in the same month.

=== In France ===
Louis married his first cousin once removed Yolande of Aragon at the St. Trophime Cathedral in Arles on 2 December 1400. On the same day, she was crowned queen. This gave him a possibility of inheriting the throne of Aragon through her right. Her father, King John I of Aragon had died in 1396, and her uncle king Martin I of Aragon died in 1410.

Louis founded a university in Aix-en-Provence in 1409.

In 1409, Louis liberated Rome from Ladislaus' occupation; in 1410, as an ally of the Pisan Antipope John XXIII he attacked Ladislaus and defeated him at Roccasecca (1411). Eventually Louis lost his Neapolitan support and had to retire. His claim to Naples passed to his son, Louis III.

His son, Louis, was initially betrothed to Catherine of Burgundy, a daughter of John the Fearless, Duke of Burgundy. However, after the Duke of Burgundy instigated a mob attack on the Dauphin of France in 1413, Louis and his wife joined the Armagnac Faction. The betrothal to Catherine was repudiated, which caused the enmity of the Duke of Burgundy.

He was not present at the Battle of Agincourt, because he had a bladder infection. After the battle, he fled from Paris to join his wife and children at Angers.

Louis II died at his château of Angers, the county town of Anjou; he is buried there.

== Family ==
Louis and Yolande had five surviving children:

- Louis III of Anjou (1403–1434), succeeded Louis II as titular King of Naples and Duke of Anjou.
- Marie of Anjou (1404–1463), married in 1422 at Bourges to King Charles VII of France.
- René of Anjou (1409–1480), King of Naples and Duke of Anjou.
- Yolande of Anjou (1412, Arles – 1440), married firstly Philip I, Duke of Brabant, and secondly in 1431, Francis I, Duke of Brittany.
- Charles of Anjou (1414–1472), Count of Maine.

== Sources ==
- Abulafia, David (2014). The Western Mediterranean Kingdoms 1200–1500: The Struggle for Dominion. Routledge. ISBN 978-1-13814594-8.
- Kekewich, Margaret L. (2008). The Good King: René of Anjou and Fifteenth Century Europe. Palgrave Macmillan. ISBN 978-1-4039-8820-1.
- Laidlaw, James (2000). "Alain Chartier and the Arts of Crisis Management, 1417–1429". In Allmand, Christopher (ed.). War, Government and Power in Late Medieval France. Liverpool University Press. pp. 37–53. ISBN 0-85323-705-0.
- Peyronnet, Georges (2016). "The distant origins of the Italian wars: political relations between France and Italy in the fourteenth and fifteenth centuries". In Abulafia, David (ed.). The French Descent into Renaissance Italy, 1494–95: Antecedents and Effects. Routledge. pp. 30–53. ISBN 9780860785507.
- Rohr, Zita Eva (2016). Yolanda of Aragon (1381–1442), Family and Power: The Reverse of the Tapestry. Palgrave Macmillan. ISBN 978-1-137-49912-7.
- Ryder, Alan (2016). "The Angevin bid for Naples, 1380–1480". In Abulafia, David (ed.). The French Descent into Renaissance Italy, 1494–95: Antecedents and Effects. Routledge. pp. 55–69. ISBN 9780860785507.
- Sumption, Jonathan (2009). The Hundred Years War, Volume III: Divided Houses. Faber and Faber. ISBN 978-0-571-24012-8.
- Tuchman, Barbara W. (1978). A Distant Mirror: the Calamitous 14th Century. Random House. ISBN 0-345-34957-1.

Louis II of Anjou House of Valois-Anjou Cadet branch of the Capetian dynasty
Regnal titles
Preceded by Ladislaus	King of Naples; 1389 – 1399	Succeeded by Ladislaus
Preceded by Louis I	Duke of Anjou; Count of Maine, Piedmont and Provence; 1384 – 1417	Succeeded by Louis III
Preceded by Louis I	— TITULAR — King of Naples; 1384 – 1417	Succeeded by Louis III
