= Manfredi III Chiaramonte =

Sicilian nobleman

Manfredi III Chiaramonte (died November 1391) was a Sicilian nobleman.

Of French origins, he was given the County of Modica, then one of the most powerful fiefs in the Kingdom of Sicily, in 1377. He was also made lord of Trapani, Agrigento, Bivona, Licata, Castronovo, Lentini, Palma di Montechiaro and Mussomeli, where he built a castle which still bears his name. Manfredi was governor of Messina, and, after having liberated the island of Jerba from Arab pirates, he was made also lord of it. He held court in the Palazzo Chiaramonte of Palermo.

Despite having obtained his lands by the Aragonese Kings of Sicily, he usually sided for the Angevines who held the rival Kingdom of Naples. In 1354 Manfredi was besieged in Lentini by the Aragonese troops of Artale I Alagona; the latter was able to capture it by treason only in 1360. Manfredi was captured and imprisoned in Catania; however he later escaped and regained his possessions.

His daughter Costanza (born 1377) married the future King Ladislaus of Naples in Gaeta in 1389. At the death of king Frederick III, Manfredi became one of four viceroys, ruling the kingdom for Maria, Queen of Sicily. Maria was kidnapped by the Aragonese and forced to marry Martin I the Younger. Manfredi fought against Aragonese power.

Manfredi Chiaramonte died in Palermo in 1391. His son, Andrea Chiaramonte, governor of Palermo, was beheaded in 1392 by Martin I of Aragon (Martin the Elder) after the fall of Palermo. With the fall of the family from power, his daughter Costanza was divorced by the King Ladislaus and forced to marry a local Neapolitan noble.
