= Joanna II of Naples =

Queen of Naples from 1414 to 1435

Joanna II
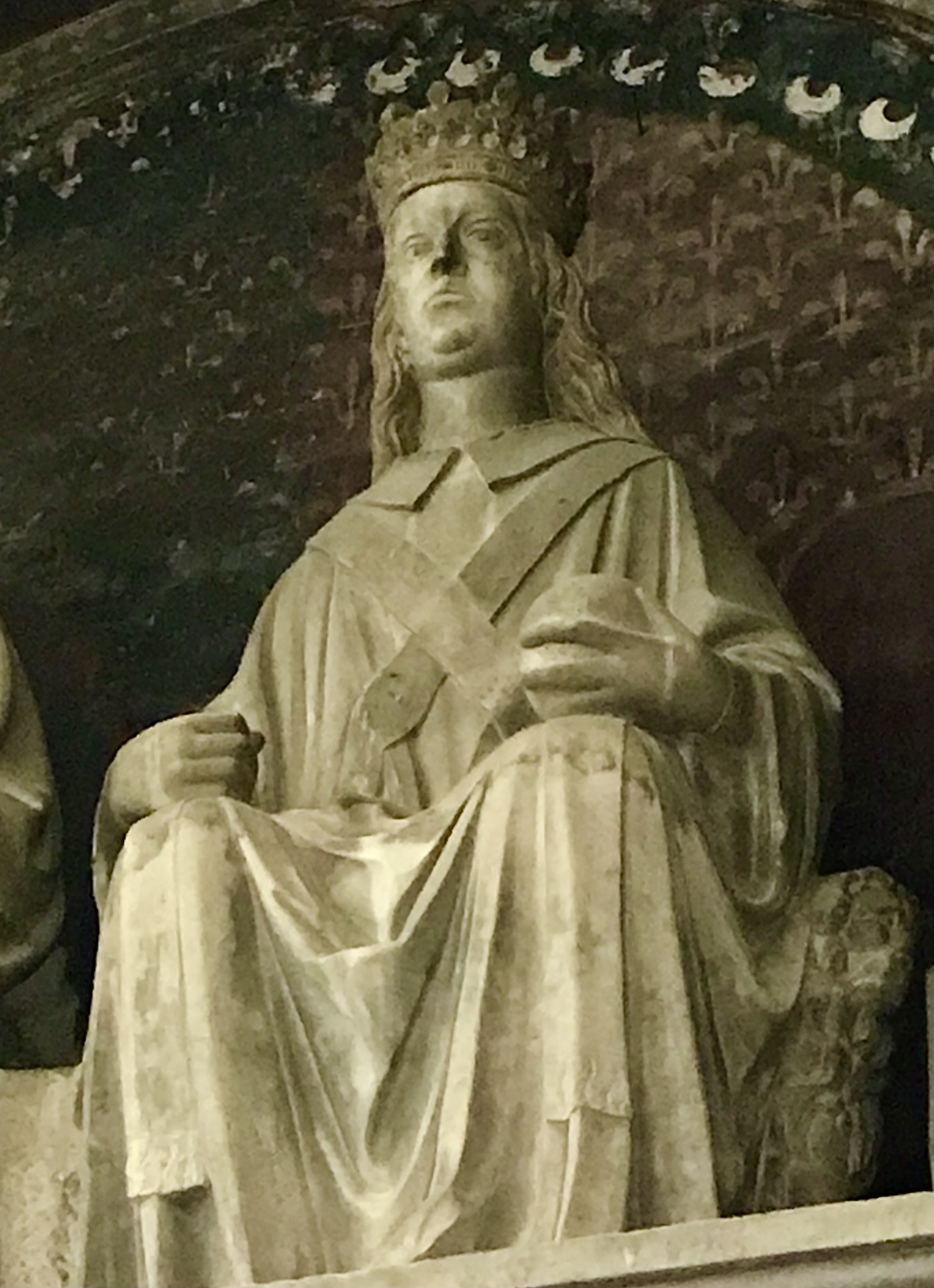
- 15th-century depiction of Joanna from the funerary monument of her brother Ladislaus of Naples

Queen of Naples
- Reign: 6 August 1414 – 2 February 1435
- Coronation: 28 October 1419
- Predecessor: Ladislaus
- Successor: René I
- Born: 25 June 1371; Zadar, Kingdom of Croatia
- Died: 2 February 1435 (aged 63); Naples, Kingdom of Naples
- Burial: Church of Santa Annunziata, Naples, Kingdom of Naples
- Spouses: William, Duke of Austria (m. 1401; died 1406) James II, Count of La Marche (m. 1415)
- House: Capetian House of Anjou
- Father: Charles III of Naples
- Mother: Margaret of Durazzo

Joanna II (Italian: Giovanna II; 25 June 1371 – 2 February 1435) was Queen of Naples from 1414 until her death in 1435, marking the extinction of the senior line of the Capetian House of Anjou. In addition to her primary title, she also claimed several other royal titles, including titular queen of Jerusalem, Hungary, Sicily, Dalmatia, Croatia, and Rama.

Born in Zadar as daughter to Charles III of Naples, she ascended the throne following the death of her brother Ladislaus. Her reign was marked by political turbulence, shifting alliances and personal scandals, including marriages to William of Austria and James II of La Marche. Joanna navigated complex rivalries between the Angevin and Aragonese claimants to Naples, ultimately designating Rene of Anjou as her heir. The final years of her reign were marked by relative peace and political stability. Her death resulted in the end of the Angevin dynasty's rule in Naples and ushered in the Valois-Anjou succession.

== Early life ==
Joanna was born at Zara (present-day Zadar, Croatia), on 25 June 1371, as the daughter of Charles III of Naples and Margaret of Durazzo.

After 1386, Marie of Blois Duchess Dowager of Anjou started negotiations about her son Louis II of Anjou's marriage with Joanna, but Louis flatly refused to marry the daughter of his father's principal enemy in May 1387. Joanna married her first husband, William, Duke of Austria, in Vienna in the autumn of 1401 when she was 28 years of age. He had been rejected as a husband by her cousin, Queen Hedwig of Poland. Joanna did not have any children by William, who died in 1406 after five years of marriage. After his death she acquired a lover by the name of Pandolfello Piscopo, called "Alopo" [bald], whom she appointed Grand Chamberlain. Alopo was the first of several powerful favourites in Joanna's court. During this period, Muzio Attendolo Sforza served as Grand Constable of Naples, leading military campaigns on her behalf until his death in 1424.

== Accession ==
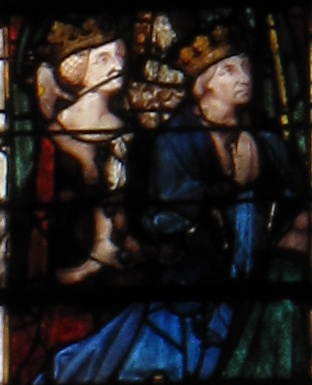
15th century stained glass depiction of Joanna and her husband James II of La Marche

In 1414, the 41-year-old and childless Joanna succeeded her brother Ladislaus on the throne of Naples. In early 1415, she became engaged to John, a son of King Ferdinand I of Aragon and twenty-five years her junior. The betrothal was annulled shortly after, which left Joanna free to choose another husband. On 10 August 1415, she married a second time, to James II, Count of La Marche, in order to gain the support of the French monarchy. The marriage contract stipulated that upon his marriage to Joanna, James would be granted the title of Prince of Taranto. Not having received the promised title, he had Alopo killed and forced Joanna to name him King of Naples. In an attempt to assume complete power, James imprisoned Joanna in her own apartments in the royal palace; however, she was later released by the nobles.

In 1416, a riot exploded in Naples, and James was compelled to send back his French administrators and to renounce his title. In this period, Joanna began her relationship with Sergianni Caracciolo, who later acquired an overwhelming degree of power over the court. On 28 August 1417, she reconquered Rome, and the following year James left Naples for France.

== Rupture with the papacy ==
With James now powerless, Joanna could finally celebrate her coronation on 28 October 1419, when she was crowned Queen of Sicily and Naples. However, her relationship with Naples' nominal feudal suzerain, Pope Martin V, soon worsened. Upon the advice of Caracciolo, she denied Martin economic aid to rebuild the papal army. In response, the Pope called in Louis III of Anjou, son of the rival of King Ladislaus and himself still a pretender to the Neapolitan throne. In 1420, Louis invaded Campania, but the Pope, trying to gain personal advantage from the menace posed to Joanna, called the ambassadors of the two parties to Florence.

Joanna rejected the ambiguous papal proposal, calling for help from the brother of her erstwhile betrothed, the powerful King Alfonso V of Aragon, to whom she promised the hereditary title to Naples. Alfonso entered Naples in July 1421. Louis lost the support of the Pope, but at the same time the relationship between Joanna and Alfonso worsened. In May 1423, Alfonso had Caracciolo arrested and besieged Joanna's residence, the Castel Capuano. An agreement was obtained; Caracciolo was freed, and fled to Aversa with Joanna. Here she met again with Louis, declared her adoption of Alfonso to be null and void, and named Louis as her new heir. Alfonso was forced to return to Spain, and Joanna returned to Naples in April 1424.

Caracciolo became ruler of Naples in all but name, accumulating great wealth and power. Eventually Joanna tired of his presumption, and plotted his assassination in 1432. On 19 August 1432, Caracciolo was stabbed in his room in Castel Capuano.

== Years of peace and death ==
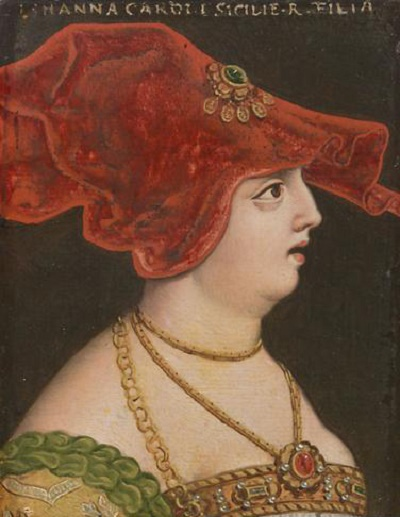
Joanna II of Naples as depicted by Anton Boys, c. late 16th century

The final years of Joanna's reign were marked by relative peace and political stability, in contrast to the turbulent succession disputes that had dominated the earlier part of her rule. After the death of Alfonso V, his claim had waned; Joanna reconciled with the Angevin faction and formally recognized Louis III of Anjou as her heir.

Louis took up residence in the Duchy of Calabria, the traditional fief for the Neapolitan crown prince, where he remained in anticipation of ascending the throne. However, he died prematurely in 1434, only a year before the queen herself. In his place, the aging Joanna designated his younger brother, René of Anjou, as her new heir.

Joanna died in Naples on 2 February 1435 at the age of 63, and was interred in the Church of the Santissima Annunziata. With her death, the senior line of the Capetian House of Anjou became extinct, bringing an end to the House of Anjou-Durazzo and, more broadly, to the Angevin dynasty's rule in Naples. She was succeeded by René of Valois-Anjou, who became René I. René was the brother of Joanna's designated heir, Louis III of Anjou, who had predeceased her. Both men belonged to the House of Valois-Anjou, which had asserted claims to the Neapolitan throne since 1380. They had styled themselves—albeit nominally—as kings of Naples, based on hereditary rights conferred by Joanna I of Anjou to Louis I of Valois-Anjou, prior to her deposition by Charles III, Joanna II's father.

== Legends ==
In popular oral tradition, the darkest and most lurid tales are associated with Joanna II. Perhaps due to her reputation for scandalous relationships, she became a fitting figure upon whom to project the vices attributed to her. It is said that the queen welcomed into her bedchamber lovers of every sort and social class, sometimes even selected by her emissaries from among the most handsome commoners.

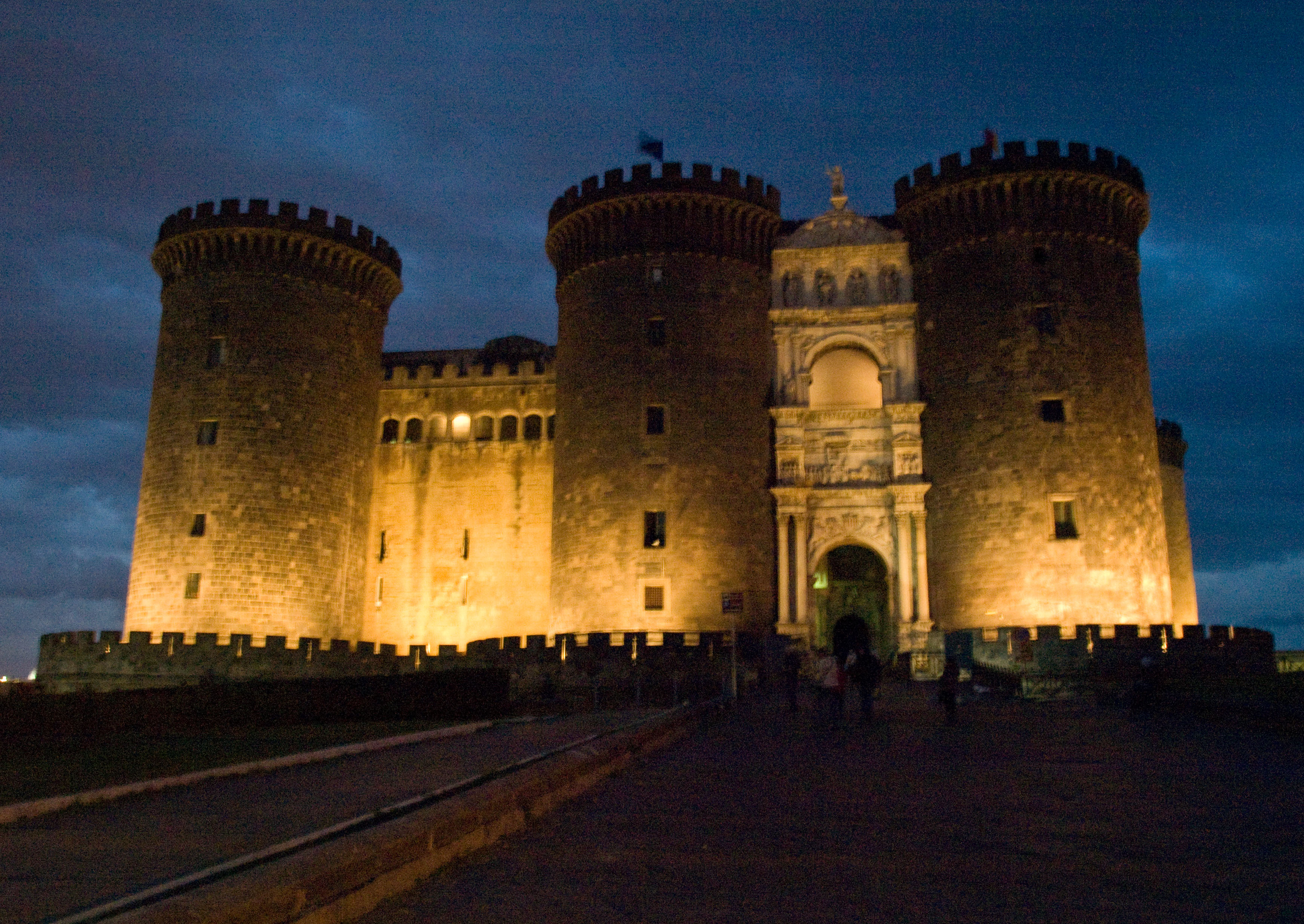
Castel Nuovo, associated with legends about Joanna II.

To preserve her reputation, Joanna would allegedly dispose of them once her desires were satisfied. According to long-standing legend, she was said to have had a secret trapdoor inside Castel Nuovo, also known as the Maschio Angioino, through which these lovers—once used—were thrown into a pit and devoured by sea monsters.

Over time, the legend gave rise to an even more fantastical tale involving a crocodile said to have crossed the Mediterranean Sea from Africa and taken residence in the castle's underground chambers. In the popular imagination, this fearsome creature became the executioner of Joanna's unfortunate lovers.

Though likely fictional, the legend—macabre and unsettling—has only served to heighten public fascination with both Joanna I and Joanna II of Naples, two women who ruled a kingdom at the heart of political struggles during one of the most turbulent periods in its history.

=== Destruction of Satrianum ===
According to legend, two separate episodes—possibly connected—led to the destruction of the Lombard stronghold and episcopal seat of Satrianum.

In the first version, sometime between 1420 and 1430, Queen Joanna II ordered that a young lady-in-waiting from Terlizzi, a small Apulian town, be escorted by royal troops to an unspecified destination, possibly Naples or Salerno. While passing through Satrianum, the noblewoman—described as strikingly beautiful—was abducted. Enraged by the affront, the queen reportedly ordered a brutal act of retribution: the total destruction of the town Her orders were carried out without exception—today, only a Norman-style tower and a few scattered ruins remain as silent witnesses to the devastation.

A second version of the story suggests a more personal motive. During a visit to the settlement, Queen Joanna fell in love with a local baron. Upon discovering that he was in love with her lady-in-waiting named Seal and did not return her affections, the queen flew into a rage. After returning to her court, she is said to have ordered her men to lay the town "to sword and fire."

== Sources ==
- Emerton, Ephraim (1917). The Beginnings of Modern Europe (1250–1450). Ginn and Company.
- Jackson, Guida M. (1999). Women Rulers Throughout the Ages: An Illustrated Guide. Santa Barbara, CA: ABC-CLIO. ISBN 1-57607-091-3.
- Rohr, Zita Eva (2016). Yolanda of Aragon (1381–1442), Family and Power: The Reverse of the Tapestry. Palgrave Macmillan. ISBN 978-1-137-49912-7.
- Woodacre, Elena (2013). The Queens Regnant of Navarre: Succession, Politics, and Partnership, 1274–1512. London: Palgrave Macmillan. ISBN 978-1137339140.

Joanna II of Naples Capetian House of Anjou Cadet branch of the Capetian dynasty Born: 25 June 1371 Died: 2 February 1435
Regnal titles
Preceded by Ladislaus	Queen of Naples; 1414–1435	Succeeded by René I
