= Margaret of Durazzo =

Queen of Naples from 1382 to 1386

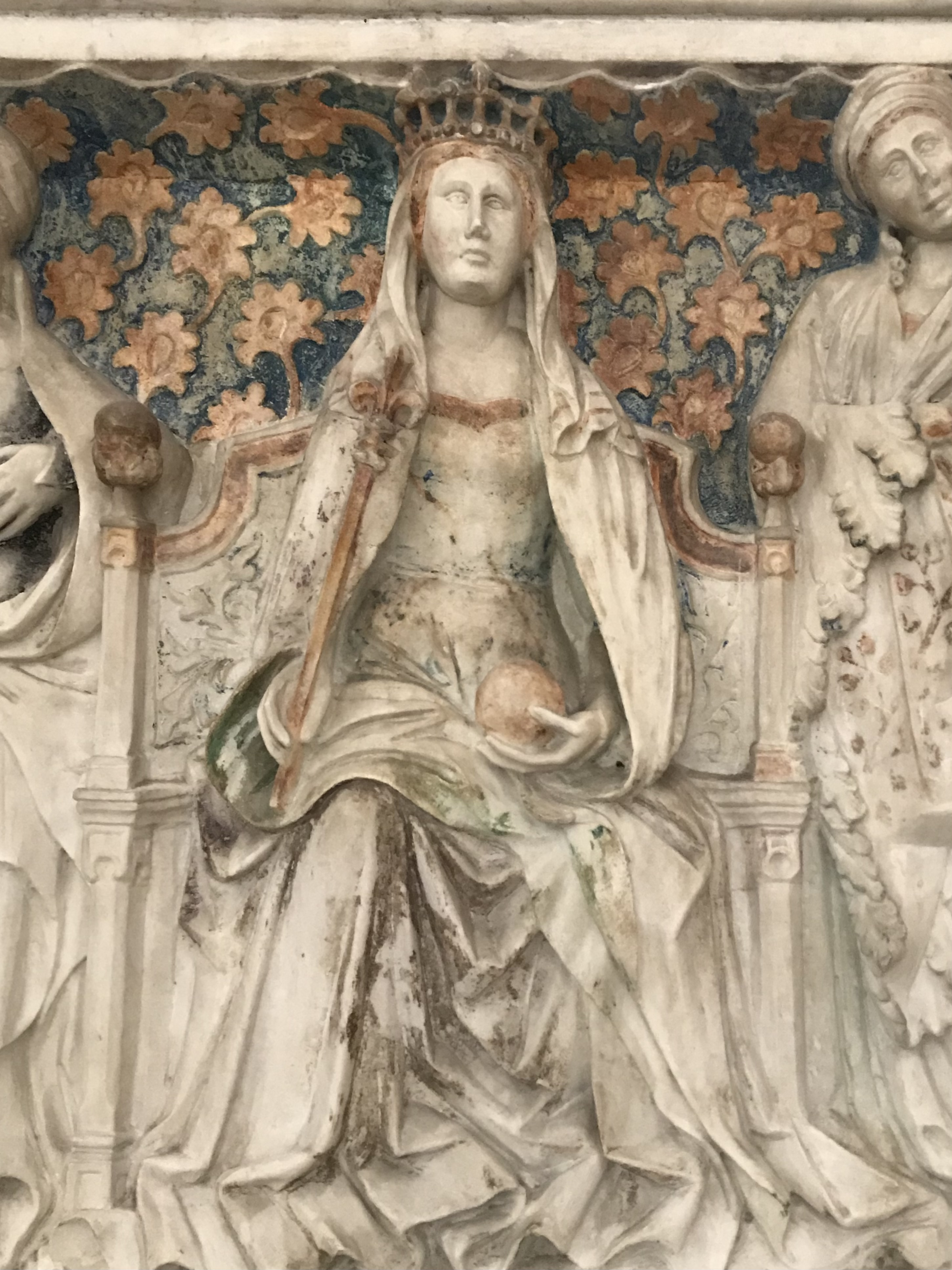
- Funerary monument of Queen Margaret of Durazzo, Salerno Cathedral

Queen consort of Naples
- Tenure: 12 May 1382 – 24 February 1386
- Coronation: 25 November 1382

Queen consort of Hungary
- Tenure: 1385 – 24 February 1386
- Born: 28 July 1347
- Died: 6 August 1412 (aged 65); Acquamela, Kingdom of Naples (modern Italy)
- Burial: Salerno Cathedral
- Spouse: Charles III of Naples m. 1369
- Issue More: Joanna II, Queen of Naples; Ladislaus, King of Naples
- House: Anjou-Durazzo
- Father: Charles, Duke of Durazzo
- Mother: Maria of Calabria

Margaret of Durazzo (Italian: Margherita di Durazzo 28 July 1347 – 6 August 1412) was Queen of Naples and Hungary and Princess of Achaea as the spouse of Charles III of Naples. She was regent of Naples from 1386 until 1393 during the minority of her son Ladislaus of Naples.

== Life ==
She was the fourth daughter of Charles, Duke of Durazzo (1323–1348), and Maria of Calabria, but the only one to have children; her legitimate line of descent, as well as the century-old Capetian House of Anjou, ended with her daughter.

In February 1369, Margaret married her paternal first cousin Charles of Durazzo. He was a son of Louis of Durazzo, another son of John, Duke of Durazzo, and his second wife Agnes de Périgord. The bride was twenty-two years old and the groom twenty-four.

=== Queen ===
Charles managed to depose her maternal aunt Queen Joanna I of Naples in 1382. He succeeded her and Margaret became his queen consort. Charles succeeded James of Baux as Prince of Achaea in 1383 with Margaret still as his consort.

By then becoming the senior Angevin male, Charles was offered the Crown of Hungary. Margaret did not support the idea of deposing Queen Mary of Hungary and discouraged her husband from doing so. Nonetheless, he successfully deposed Mary in December 1385 and had himself crowned. She was the daughter of his deceased cousin Louis I of Hungary and Elizabeth of Bosnia. However, Mary's formidable mother Elizabeth arranged his assassination at Visegrád on 24 February 1386.

=== Regent ===
In the meantime, relationships with Pope Urban VI became strained, as he suspected that Charles was plotting against him. In January 1385 he had six cardinals arrested, and one, under torture, revealed Charles' conjure. He thus excommunicated Charles and Margaret and raised an interdict over the Kingdom of Naples.

Margaret became a queen dowager and the regent of Naples as the guardian of her minor son from 1386 until 1393. In 1387 she poisoned her elder sister Joanna, Duchess of Durazzo, who might have a better claim to the throne of Naples, and her husband Robert IV of Artois, Count of Eu to death. She survived her husband by twenty-six years but never remarried. Their son Ladislaus succeeded to the throne of the Kingdom of Naples while Mary of Hungary was restored to her throne. Margaret insisted that her husband's death be revenged and Elizabeth was murdered. The heads of her defenders were sent to console Margaret.

Pope Boniface IX and Margarethe came to a peace agreement, her excommunication was lifted and with the help of Cardinal Angelo Acciaioli Margaret could continue to serve as regent until July 1393.

=== Later life ===
In the last years of her life, the queen dowager retired first to Salerno and then to Acquamela, where she died of plague in 1412. She had become a devout Catholic and a member of a Franciscan Third Order in her last years and requested to be buried as such; she was buried in white habit in Salerno Cathedral.

== Issue ==
- Mary of Durazzo (1369–1371).
- Joanna II of Naples (25 June 1371 – 2 February 1435)
- Ladislaus of Naples (11 February 1377 – 6 August 1414)

Margaret of Durazzo House of Anjou-Durazzo Cadet branch of the Capetian House of Anjou Born: 1347 Died: 1412
Royal titles
Vacant Title last held by Otto of Brunswick-Grubenhagen as king consort	Queen consort of Naples; 1382–1386	Vacant Title next held by Costanza Chiaramonte
Vacant Title last held by Elisabeth of Bosnia	Queen consort of Hungary; 1385–1386	Vacant Title next held by Barbara of Cilli
