= Ladislaus of Naples =

King of Naples from 1386 to 1414

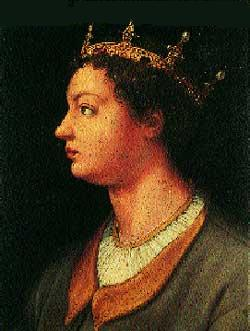
- Portrait by Cristofano dell'Altissimo, 1552–1568

King of Naples
- Reign: 24 February 1386 – 6 August 1414
- Coronation: 29 May 1390; Gaeta, by Angelo Acciaioli II
- Predecessor: Charles III of Naples
- Successor: Joanna II of Naples
- Contender: Louis II of Anjou (1389–1399)

King of Hungary and Croatia Contested by Sigismund
- Reign: 13 July 1403 – 7 November 1403
- Coronation: 5 August 1403, Zadar
- Predecessor: Sigismund
- Successor: Sigismund
- Born: 15 February 1377; Naples, Kingdom of Naples
- Died: 6 August 1414 (aged 37); Naples, Kingdom of Naples
- Burial: San Giovanni a Carbonara
- Spouses: Costanza Chiaramonte (m. 1390; ann. 1392); Mary of Lusignan (m. 1403; died 1404); Mary of Enghien (m. 1406)
- Issue Details: Reynold, Prince of Capua (ill.); Mary of Durazzo (ill.)
- House: Anjou-Durazzo
- Father: Charles III of Naples
- Mother: Margaret of Durazzo

Ladislaus of Naples (Italian: Ladislao, Hungarian: László; 15 February 1377 – 6 August 1414) was King of Naples from 1386 until his death and an unsuccessful claimant to the kingdoms of Hungary and Croatia. Ladislaus was a skilled political and military leader, protector and controller of Pope Innocent VII; however, he earned a bad reputation concerning his personal life. He profited from disorder throughout Italy to greatly expand his kingdom and his power, appropriating much of the Papal States to his own use. He was the last male of the Capetian House of Anjou.

== Youth ==
Ladislaus was born in Naples on 15 February 1377 during the reign of his great-aunt Queen Joanna I of Naples. He was the son of Charles III of Naples and Margaret of Durazzo, both members of the Capetian House of Anjou. His parents, having lived for years at the court of their kinsman King Louis I of Hungary, named him after King Saint Ladislaus I of Hungary. In 1379, his father declared war on Joanna and proclaimed himself king with the backing of Pope Urban VI. Fearing that Joanna would take her as hostage, Margaret fled with Ladislaus to her castle in Morcone. They returned to Naples on 11 September 1381, after Charles prevailed over Joanna. On 5 November, Charles invested Ladislaus with the Duchy of Calabria, traditionally held by the heir apparent.

Ladislaus became King of Naples at the age of nine (in 1386) under his mother's regency after his father was assassinated while pursuing his claim to the throne of Hungary. At the time the kingdom saw a rebellion of the barons (fomented by Pope Urban VI), and there was a risk of a French invasion, since in 1385 the pope had assigned the throne to Louis II of Anjou, Count of Provence. Urban VI refused to recognise Ladislaus, and in 1387 called a crusade against him. Margaret and her son, at the time, controlled not much more than Naples and its neighbourhood. After turmoil broke out in the city, they fled to the fortress of Gaeta, while Naples was occupied by an Angevin army led by Otto, Duke of Brunswick-Grubenhagen, widower of Joanna I of Naples, who had named Louis' father as her heir.

In 1389, the new Pope Boniface IX recognised Ladislaus as King of Naples, although he forbade him to unite it with his family lands in Germany and Italy. In Gaeta, Ladislaus married Costanza Chiaramonte, the daughter of the powerful Sicilian baron, Manfredi III Chiaramonte. Within a few years, the marriage was annulled.

In 1390, the archbishop of Arles poisoned Ladislaus, and though he survived, he subsequently stuttered and was forced to take repeated periods of rest. Also in 1390, Louis II invaded Naples, starting a war with Ladislaus lasting nine years. Ladislaus limited Louis II's control to the city of Naples and the Terra d'Otranto. In 1399, while Louis was fighting against the Count of Lecce, Ladislaus regained the city of Naples with the support of several powerful barons of the kingdom, including Raimondo Orsini del Balzo. Louis II of Anjou then decided to return to the County of Provence. Ladislaus spent the year 1400 subduing Onorato Caetani, count of Fondi, and the last rebellions in Abruzzo and Apulia.

== Claim to Hungary ==
Coat of arms of Ladislaus, depicting his claims to the kingdoms of Hungary, Naples and Jerusalem

In 1401, Ladislaus married Mary of Lusignan, daughter of the King of Cyprus. She arrived in Naples in 1402. In the same period, Ladislaus tried to restore Angevin rule in the Kingdom of Hungary and Croatia, where some of the nobles opposed King Sigismund of Luxembourg. Between 1403 and 1414, Ladislaus ordered the painting of a cycle of the Legend of Saint Ladislaus in the church of Santa Maria Incoronata in Naples. In these paintings, the Hungarian king is depicted receiving the royal crown, fighting against the pagans, and receiving the crown of Croatia. (The cult of Saint Ladislaus and other Hungarian kings was already present in Naples and other Italian regions since the second half of the 13th century, thanks to Mary of Hungary, Queen of Naples, who brought them when she married Charles II of Naples.)

Considering himself the heir of the kings of Hungary, Ladislaus tried many times to obtain the crown of Hungary. He also proclaimed himself Duke of Slavonia, a title with no basis. He first negotiated a treaty with the Republic of Venice, ceding the island of Corfu. He thus obtained free passage in the Adriatic Sea and, with the partial support of the Pope, landed at Zara on 19 July 1403. On 5 August 1403, while in the town of Zara, Ladislaus was crowned king of Hungary and Croatia by János Kanizsai, archbishop of Esztergom, in the presence of the papal legate, Cardinal Angelo Acciaioli. Even after his coronation, the rule of Ladislaus in Croatia and Hungary never extended beyond Dalmatia. His father grew up in Hungary, governing Croatia as viceroy, and eventually became king. However, Ladislaus remained inactive and returned to Apulia; his authority in Dalmatia remained restricted to little more than the city of Zara. The following year, after the death of Pope Boniface IX, he intervened in Rome in support of the Colonna family, two days after the election of the new Pope Innocent VII.

== Conquest of central Italy ==
Aspiring to the brilliant prestige and might of his imperial forbearer in southern Italy, Frederick II, Holy Roman Emperor and King of Sicily, Ladislaus was determined to conquer central Italy and extend his power into Tuscany and farther north. Ladislaus endeavoured to consolidate Neapolitan royal power at the expense of the barons and brought about the murders of several members of the Sanseverino family for frustrating his ends. In 1405, he went again to Rome. When some nobles offered him the lordship of the city, the Pope responded by deposing him as King of Naples on 9 January 1406. The Pope had incited Raimondo Del Balzo Orsini to rebel, but he died soon after. His wife, Mary of Enghien, continued the rebellion and successfully defended Taranto against a two-month long siege by Ladislaus in the spring of 1406. She did not surrender even after Ladislaus and the Pope signed a treaty of peace in July, by which Ladislaus became the protector of the Papal States. He moved to Taranto again early in 1407, this time with diplomatic intentions. Since his second wife had died in 1404, Ladislaus solved the matter of Taranto by marrying Mary of Enghien on 23 April 1407.

In 1407, trying to take advantage of the feebler personality of the new Pope Gregory XII, Ladislaus invaded the Papal States and conquered Ascoli Piceno and Fermo. In 1408, he besieged Ostia to prevent a success of the French party in the schism between the Pope Gregory XII and Antipope Benedict XIII. After a short siege, he captured the city by bribing the Papal commander, Paolo Orsini, and entered Rome on 25 April. Later, Perugia also fell into his hands.

In 1409, Ladislaus sold his rights to Dalmatia to Venice for 100,000 ducats. This was part of his attempts to gain allies in the upcoming war against the Republic of Florence, caused by his expansion in central Italy and his alliance with Paolo Guinigi, lord of Lucca, a traditional enemy of the Florentines. Ladislaus invaded Tuscany, capturing Cortona and the island of Elba from Gherardo Appiani. Florence hired the condottiere Braccio da Montone, who defeated Ladislaus, and he was forced to retreat. However, he had not abandoned his aims in northern Italy and took advantage of the presence of Pope Gregory XII in Gaeta.

Fearing his aims, the Republics of Siena and Florence and the powerful cardinal Baldassarre Cossa allied against him. Antipope Alexander V excommunicated him and called Louis II of Anjou back to Italy to conquer Naples. Louis II arrived in late July 1409 with 1,500 cavalry and was invested with the Neapolitan crown. The allies' troops, under Muzio Attendolo, Braccio da Montone and other condottieri, invaded the Papal lands under Ladislaus' control and moved to Rome; Orsini, left by Ladislaus to protect the city, defected to them with 2,000 men. However, the allies captured only the Vatican and the Trastevere quarter. Cardinal Cossa and Louis II left the siege to their condottieri and moved to northern Italy and Provence in search of further support.

Ladislaus took advantage of an anti-French revolt in Genoa to gain the support of that city (1410). Rome fell on 2 January, and the allies did not score any other notable results. On 16 or 17 May, Louis II's fleet, carrying new troops from Provence, was intercepted and partly destroyed off the Tuscan coast, with the loss of 6,000 men and Louis II's treasure (for a value of 600,000 ducats), which fell into the hands of Ladislaus. In the meantime, Alexander V had died, being replaced by Cossa himself as John XXIII. John XXIII proclaimed a crusade against Ladislaus and authorised the sale of indulgences to finance it.

The slow pace of the allied army led the Florentines and Sienese to accept peace with Ladislaus, which he bought by renouncing some of his Tuscan conquests. Louis II continued the struggle: his army, led by Muzio Attendolo, crushed the Neapolitan army at Roccasecca on 19 May 1411. He was unable to exploit this success, as he could not breach the defensive line that Ladislaus had set up at San Germano. Louis II soon returned to Rome and Provence, where he died six years later. In 1412, the situation turned more favourable to Ladislaus: his condottiere Carlo I Malatesta occupied part of the March of Ancona, and, above all, Muzio Attendolo Sforza joined Ladislaus. A peace was eventually signed on 14 June 1412, by which the Antipope paid 75,000 florins, invested Ladislaus with the Neapolitan crown, and named him as Gonfalonier of the Church. Ladislaus promised in turn to abandon the cause of Pope Gregory XII, who was ousted from Gaeta and moved to Rimini.

== Last campaigns and death ==
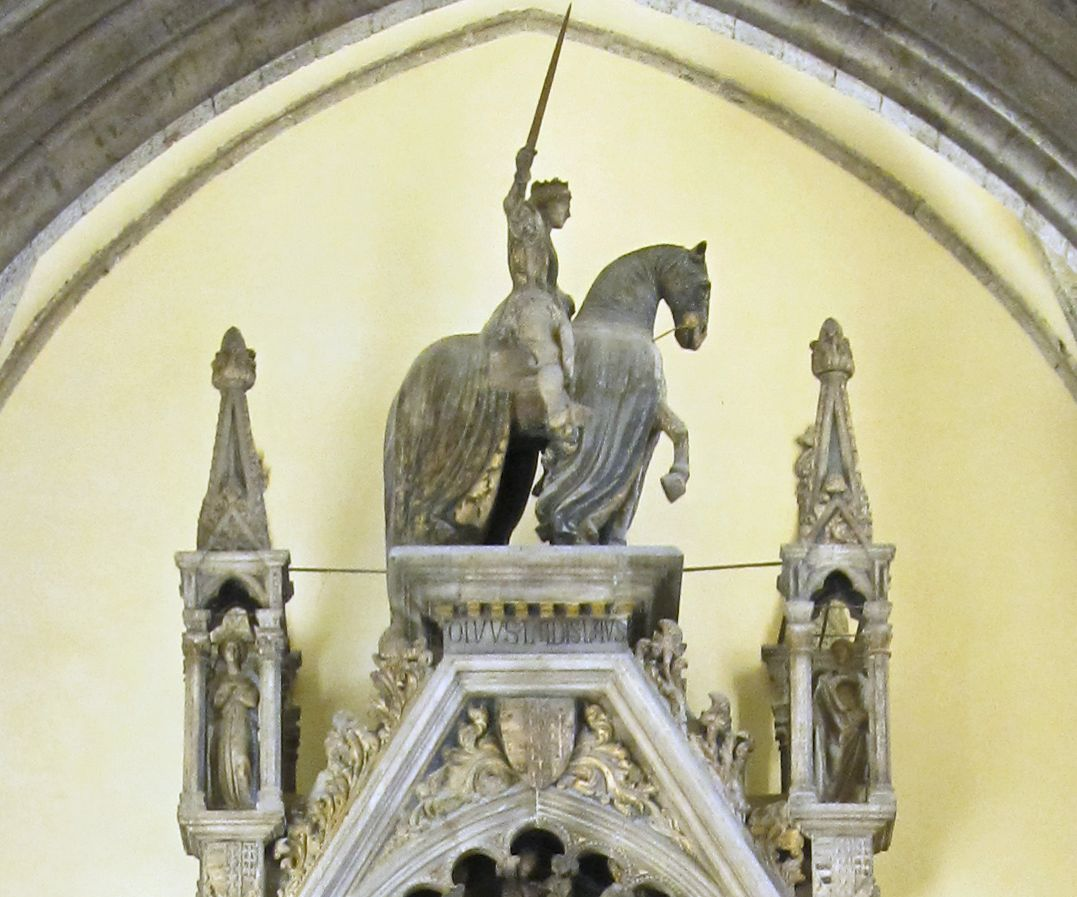
Equestrian statue of Ladislaus atop his tomb monument

The peace was only a means to gain time for both John XXIII, who did not want to pay the 75,000 florins, and Ladislaus, who feared intervention in Italy by Sigismund of Luxembourg. After Florence initiated diplomatic contacts with Sigismund, Ladislaus marched northwards in mid-May 1413. On 8 June, his troops conquered and sacked Rome, after which he went into Umbria and northern Latium. As it was clearly his next objective, Florence forestalled him by signing a treaty, which recognised Ladislaus' conquest of the Papal States (only Todi and Bologna had not fallen).

Having fallen ill in July 1414, Ladislaus was forced to return to Naples, where he died on 6 August 1414. Rumours that he had been poisoned remain unproven: it is more likely that he fell ill due to an infection of his genitals. He is buried in the church of San Giovanni a Carbonara, where a monument was built over his tomb. He was succeeded by his sister, Joanna II of Naples, the last member of the senior Angevin line in Italy.

== Marriages and issue ==
Ladislaus married three times:

- First to Costanza Chiaramonte in 1390. She was the daughter of Manfredi III Chiaramonte. After the impoverishment of the Chiaramonte family, the marriage was annulled in 1392;
- Second to Mary of Lusignan (1381–1404) on 12 February 1403 in Naples. She was the daughter of James I of Cyprus. She died on 4 September 1404;
- Third to Mary of Enghien (1367 or 1370 – 9 May 1446), suo iure Countess of Lecce, daughter of John of Enghien, in 1406. She survived him by thirty-two years.

Plus, in 1393, he agreed to marry Erhundi Hatun, a daughter of the Ottoman sultan Bayezid I in exchange for help against Sigismund of Luxembourg, but the marriage did not materialize due to the rejection of the clause providing for the princess's conversion to Christianity.

There were no children from any of his marriages. However, Ladislaus had at least two illegitimate children:

- Reynold of Durazzo, Titular "Prince of Capua", buried in Foggia. Married and had children of his own:
  - Francis of Durazzo. Married and had a son:
    - Reynold di Durazzo (1469 – 1 September 1494 and buried in Foggia), married to Camilla Tomacelli, without issue.
  - Catherine of Durazzo;
  - Camilla of Durazzo;
  - Hippolyta of Durazzo.
- Mary of Durazzo, who died young.

Ladislaus of Naples House of Anjou-Durazzo Cadet branch of the House of Anjou Born: 5 September 1187 Died: 8 November 1226
Regnal titles
Preceded by Charles III of Naples	King of Naples; 1386 – 1389	Succeeded by Louis II of Anjou
Preceded by Louis II of Anjou	King of Naples; 1399 – 1414	Succeeded by Joanna II of Naples
Preceded by Sigismund, Holy Roman Emperor	King of Hungary and Croatia; 1403 with Sigismund, Holy Roman Emperor (1403) (as contender)	Succeeded by Sigismund, Holy Roman Emperor
Preceded by Raimondo Orsini del Balzo	Prince of Taranto; 1406 – 1414	Succeeded by James II, Count of La Marche
Preceded by Mary of Enghien	Count of Lecce; 1406 – 1414; With: Mary of Enghien	Succeeded by Mary of Enghien
