= Joanna of Naples =

Joanna of Naples may refer to:

- Joanna I of Naples (1325–1382)
- Joanna II of Naples (1373–1435)
- Joanna of Aragon, Queen of Naples (1454–1517), wife of Ferdinand I of Naples
- Joanna of Naples (1478–1518), also queen consort of Ferdinand II of Naples

== See also ==
- Joanna of Aragon (disambiguation)
