= Book of hours of Frederick of Aragon =

1501–1502 devotion book

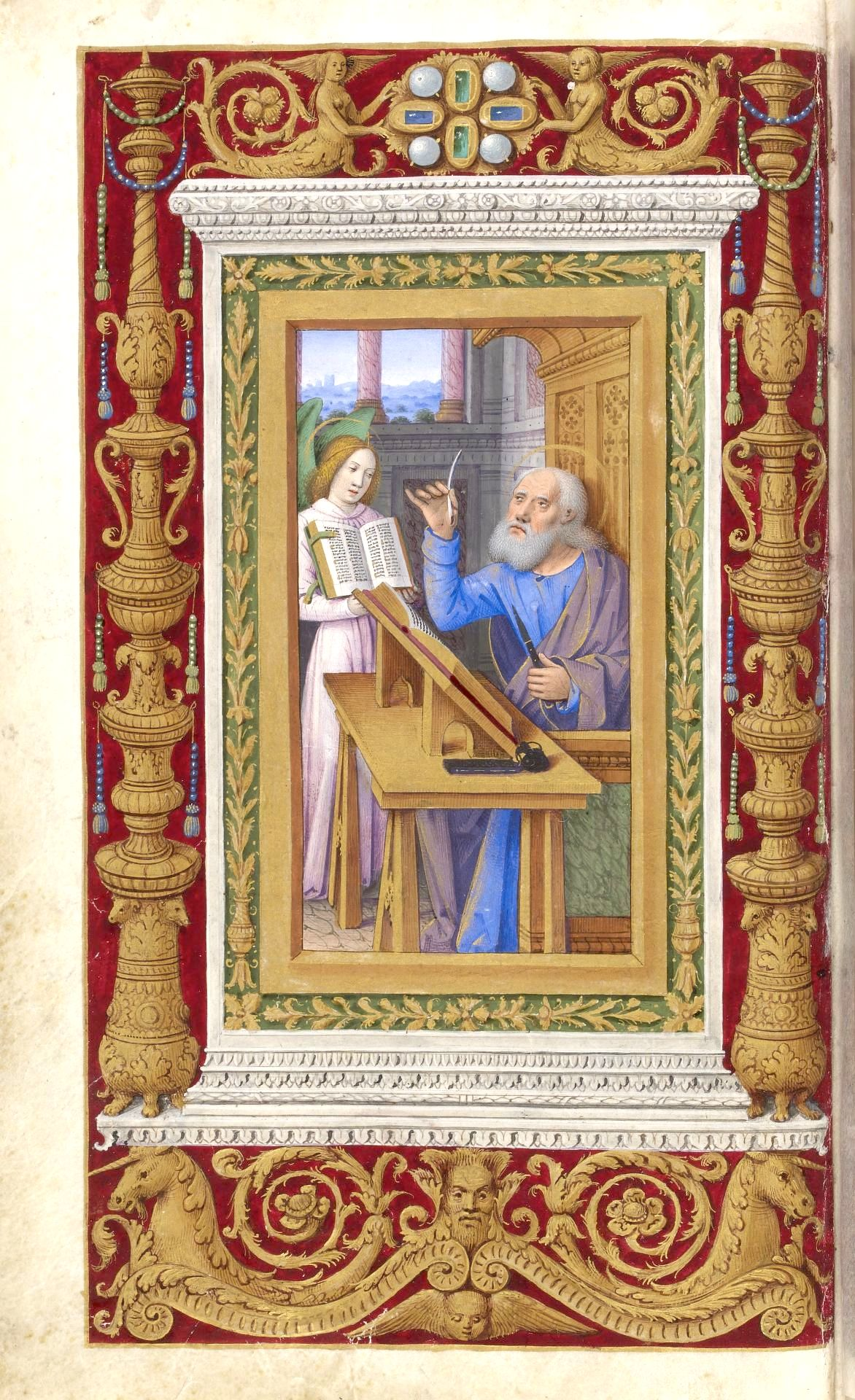
Folio 2 verso, showing Matthew the Apostle

The Book of hours of Frederick of Aragon or simply the Hours of Frederick of Aragon (Paris, BnF, Latin 10532) is a luxury book of hours, a private devotional book, made for Frederick of Aragon (also known as Frederick of Naples) between 1501 and 1502. Described as a "particularly accomplished work of art", it is the result of cooperation between three different artists, Ioan Todeschino, Jean Bourdichon, and the Master of Claude de France. The 62 full-page miniatures were made by Bourdichon, and have been described as some of his best work, while the border decorations were made by Todeschino and the Master of Claude de France. Following the death of Frederick, the book probably eventually ended up in Spain, and eventually entered the library of Joseph Bonaparte. It was eventually lost by him and finally bought by the predecessor of today's Bibliothèque nationale de France, the French national library, in 1828. It is kept in the library collections in Paris and has been exhibited to the public on several occasions.

== History ==
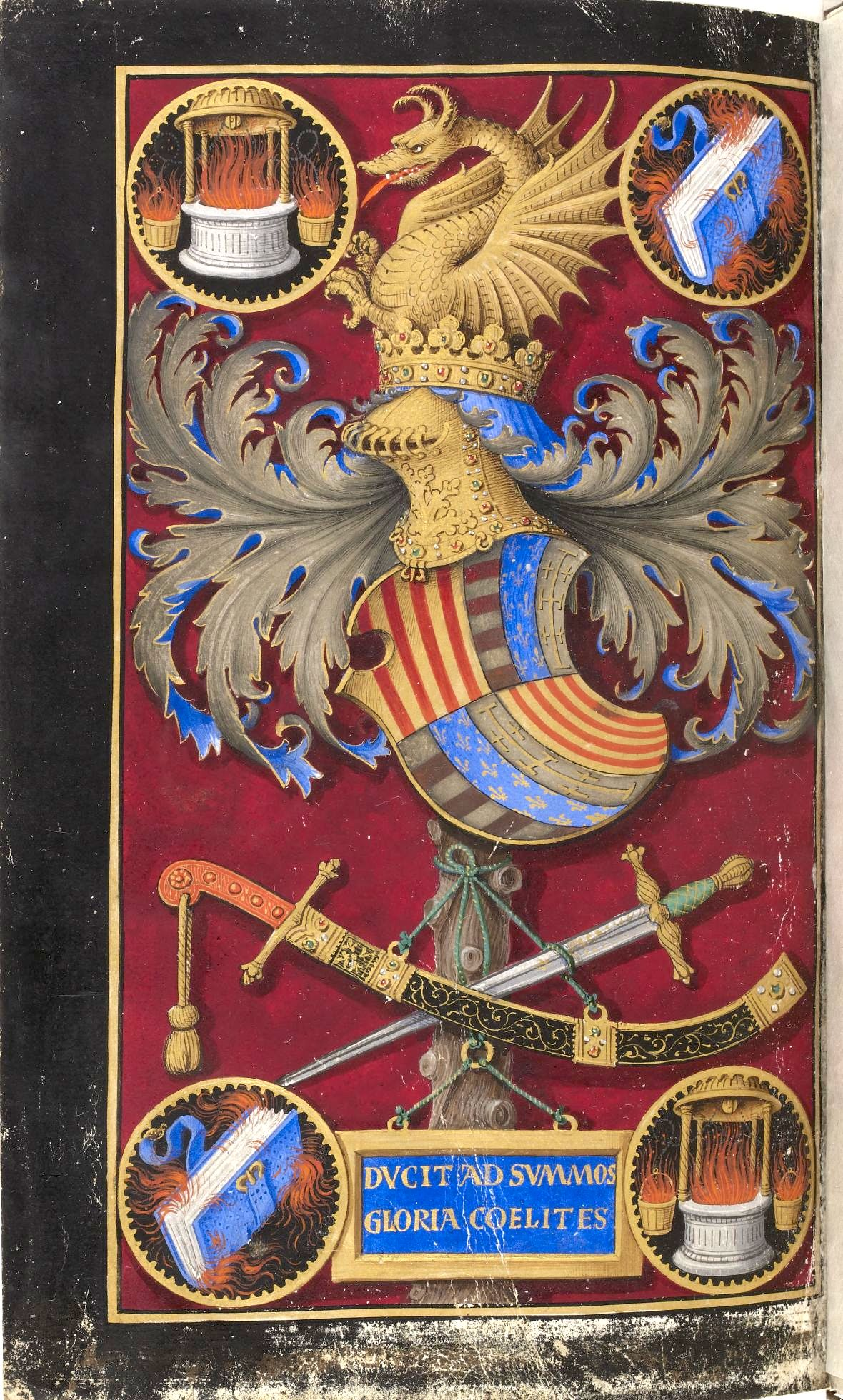
Coat of arms of Frederick of Aragon, the last full-page miniature of the book

The Hours of Frederick of Aragon is so called because it was made for Frederick of Aragon, King of Naples. It was begun around 1501 and finished sometime 1502. The text, written in a humanist script by an Italian scribe, was probably penned while Frederick was still in Naples. In 1501 he was however forced to abdicate and go into a "gilded exile" in France. He brought with him not only the unfinished manuscript but also one of his favourite illuminators, Naples-born Ioan Todeschino.

In France, the book was then decorated with great care. The rich decoration of the book is the result of a close cooperation between three artists, Ioan Todeschino and the French artists Jean Bourdichon and an artist known by a notname as the Master of Claude de France, who in between them in the book combined the French-Flemish tradition with that of the Venetian Renaissance. The full-page miniatures, 62 in total, were made by Bourdichon. Unusually, they were painted on separate rectangles of thin parchment which was then glued onto the pages of the book. The border decoration was then made by Todeschino and the Master of Claude de France.

The book has been tampered with at an unknown date, perhaps when it was rebound, and has most probably lost some pages. It lacks a calendar, which would have been expected to exist in a book of hours, and the full-page miniature with the coat of arms of Frederick probably originally appeared at the beginning of the book, but is now inserted at the very end.

After having lost his kingdom, Frederick spent the rest of his life in exile in the Château de Plessis-lez-Tours. He grew poorer and accumulated debts, and in 1503 was forced to sell i.a. large parts of his library. The remaining parts of his library were taken to Ferrara by his wife Isabella del Balzo after his death in 1504. She sold some of the books in 1523 to humanist Celio Calcagnini, and the remainder of the books eventually passed to her son, Ferdinand, Duke of Calabria. Through him they came to enter the collections of the University of Valencia. The Hours of Frederick of Aragon was probably among the books which entered the Spanish collection at this point.

The book resurfaced at the beginning of the 19th century; it was one of five books bought by the royal library of France, predecessor of today's Bibliothèque nationale de France, in February 1828. These five books were, according to a note in the library, sold by one "Monsieur Fergusson", an Englishman. The book of hours at that time carried the stamp of the library of Joseph Bonaparte, older brother of Napoleon; the stamp mark has since been lost during a restoration of the book. It is not known how the manuscript entered the collections of Joseph Bonaparte, or how it ended up in the possession of the otherwise unknown Englishman Fergusson. One possible explanation is that Joseph Bonaparte acquired it while he was King of Naples between 1806 and 1808. Later it may have fallen into English hands as loot after the Battle of Vitoria in 1813, when some of the baggage of Joseph, now King of Spain, was seized by English troops.

The book belongs to the Bibliothèque nationale, and has been exhibited several times in public exhibitions both in France and abroad.

== Description ==
The Hours of Frederick of Aragon has been described as a "particularly accomplished work of art". The full-page miniatures have been pointed out as some of Bourdichon's most delicate work, and the book has been said to contain "what are undoubtedly Bourdichon’s finest miniatures". The miniatures are arranged so that each miniature appears of the verso or left-hand page, accompanied by a richly decorated recto (right-hand side) page with the text of a new section. The borders of each pair of illustrated pages are decorated with either floral ornamentation or in a classicising style (or occasionally both); the latter displaying ornaments such as pilasters, candelabra, precious stones or imaginary figures in a distinctively Venetian-Paduan style. The book of hours contains pericopes (short versions) of the Four Evangelists, the Hours of the Virgin, the Office of the Dead, the Penitential Psalms and other liturgical texts.

The book measures 245 millimetres (9.6 in) by 155 millimetres (6.1 in). It is written on parchment and contains 388 leaves. It is bound in a dark brown bookbinding, probably made in Spain, from the 18th century. The bookbinding was restored in 1956. Émile Mâle was the first art historian to recognise the miniatures as the work of Bourdichon in 1902, but it was not until 1984 that Ioan Todeschino was recognised as the second artist, and even later that some of the paintings were attributed to the Master of Claude de France.

== Works cited ==
- Hermant, Maxence; Toscano, Gennaro (2018). "Le livre d'heures de Frédéric d'Aragon". Art de l'Enluminure (in French). 64: 4–30. ISSN 0758-413X.
