= Joanna of Aragon (disambiguation) =

Joanna of Aragon (1479–1555), historically known as Joanna the Mad, was the nominal Queen of Castile and of Aragon.

Joanna, Joan or Juana of Aragon may also refer to:

== Infantas of Aragon ==
- Joanna of Aragon, Countess of Ampurias (1344–1385), daughter of Peter IV of Aragon, married John I, Count of Ampurias
- Joanna of Aragon, Countess of Foix (1375–1407), daughter of John I of Aragon, married Matthew of Foix
- Joanna of Aragon, Queen of Naples (1454–1517), daughter of John II of Aragon, married Ferdinand I of Naples
- Joanna of Naples (1478–1518) (1478–1518), daughter of Ferdinand I of Naples, married Ferdinand II of Naples

== Other ==
- Juana Enríquez, wife of John II of Aragon

== See also ==
- Giovanna d'Aragona, Duchess of Amalfi (1478–1510), whose life inspired John Webster's play The Duchess of Malfi
- Giovanna d'Aragona (1502–1575), patron of the arts, printers and religious reform in Naples during the Renaissance
- Joanna of Naples (disambiguation)
