= Pirro del Balzo =

Italian nobleman

Pirro Del Balzo (sometimes Del Balzo Orsini; c. 1430 - 24 December 1491) was a southern Italian nobleman, a protagonist of resistance against the House of Trastámara kings of Naples and Sicily.

== Biography ==
Pirro was the eldest son of Francesco II, third duke of Andria, and Sancia di Chiaramonte, the sister of Isabella of Clermont, the Aragonese king Ferdinand I of Naples's wife. In 1451 he married Maria Donata del Balzo Orsini. After her father died while fighting in the final siege of Constantinople (1453), he received from Maria Donata the fief of Venosa and other cities in the Kingdom of Naples.

During the war between John of Anjou and the Aragonese, Pirro, along with his father, sided for the latter. When the Aragonese were routed at Sarno (7 July 1460), Pirro and his father were besieged at Andria by the main Angevine commander, Giovanni Antonio del Balzo Orsini; both were taken prisoners, while Pirro's wife and sons were also captured at Spinazzola. However, the Aragonese obtained a decisive victory at Troia on 18 August 1462; in exchange for his loyalty, king Ferdinand gave him the fief of Ginosa and, after his father's death, named him Grand Constable of the Kingdom of Naples (1481) as well as the title of Prince of Altamura.

In 1480 Pirro took part in the defense of Otranto against the Ottoman Turks.

In 1485, Pirro decided to change side, and took part in the so-called "Conspiracy of the Barons" against Ferdinand. When he received the royal order to fight against the invasion of Abruzzo by Giovanni della Rovere, he instead occupied lands for himself at Spinazzola, Genzano and Barletta. However, his conquests were soon lost to Ferrante of Naples and, after his hometown of Venosa had been captured, on 18 December 1486 Pirro was forced to submit to Ferdinand.

The plot had not finished, and the following year Pirro was arrested along with numerous other barons and jailed at Castel Nuovo. All his lands were assigned to Frederick of Naples, who had married his daughter Isabella.

Pirro died in prison at Naples in 1491.

== Sources ==
- Porzio, C. (1859). La congiura de' baroni. Naples.
- del Balzo di Presenzano, Antonello (2003). A l'asar Bautezar! I del Balzo ed il loro tempo. Naples.
