= Ferrante II =

Ferrante II may refer to:

- Ferdinand II of Naples (1469–1496)
- Ferrante II of Guastalla, of the House of Gonzaga (1575–1630)
- Ferdinand II of the Two Sicilies (1810–1859)
