= Ferdinand of Aragon =

Ferdinand of Aragon may refer to:

- Ferdinand of Aragon – Lord of Albarracín, illegitimate son of Peter III of Aragon with Inés Zapata.
- Ferdinand I of Aragon, also known as Ferdinand of Antequera (r. 1412–1416)
- Ferdinand II of Aragon, who married Isabella of Castile to become king of Spain, (1452–1516)
- Ferdinand of Aragón, Duke of Calabria (1488–1550)
- Ferdinand I of Naples, also known as Ferrante, King of Naples (r. 1458–1494)
