= King Ferdinand =

King Ferdinand may refer to:

- Ferdinand I of Aragon (1380–1416)
- Ferdinand II of Aragon (1452–1516), also Ferdinand V of Castile and León, Ferdinand "the Catholic", King of Aragon, Sicily ((Trinacria) and in Naples as Ferdinand III), and Navarre, first king of a unified Kingdom of Spain
- Ferdinand I of León (died 1065), "the Great"
- Ferdinand II of León (1157–1188)
- Ferdinand III of Castile (c. 1200–1252), "the Saint"
- Ferdinand IV of Castile (1285–1312), "the Summoned"
- Ferdinand I, Holy Roman Emperor (1503–1564), also Ferdinand I of Bohemia, Hungary and Croatia
- Ferdinand II, Holy Roman Emperor (1578–1637), also Ferdinand II of Bohemia, Hungary and Croatia
- Ferdinand III, Holy Roman Emperor (1608–1657), also Ferdinand III of Bohemia, Hungary and Croatia
- Ferdinand IV, King of the Romans (1633–1654), also King of Bohemia, and King of Hungary and Croatia
- Ferdinand I of Austria (1793–1875), also Ferdinand V of Bohemia, Hungary and Croatia
- Ferdinand I of Naples (1423–1494)
- Ferdinand II of Naples (1495–1496)
- Ferdinand I of the Two Sicilies (1751–1825), also Ferdinand IV of Naples, and Ferdinand III of Sicily
- Ferdinand II of the Two Sicilies (1810–1856)
- Ferdinand VI of Spain (1713–1759)
- Ferdinand VII of Spain (1784–1833)
- Ferdinand I of Portugal (1345–1383)
- Ferdinand II of Portugal (1816–1885)
- Ferdinand I of Romania (1865–1927)
- Ferdinand I of Bulgaria (1861–1948)
