= Joanna of Naples (1478–1518) =

Queen of Naples in 1496

Queen consort of Naples
- Tenure: 26 July 1496 – 7 September 1496
- Born: 15 April 1478; Naples
- Died: 27 August 1518 (aged 40); Naples
- Spouse: Ferdinand II of Naples (m. 1496; died 1496)
- Father: Ferdinand I of Naples
- Mother: Joanna of Aragon

Joanna of Naples (15 April 1478 – 27 August 1518) was Queen of Naples by marriage to her nephew, Ferdinand II of Naples. After the death of her spouse, she was for a short while a candidate for the throne.

== Life ==
Joanna was born at Naples, a daughter of Ferdinand I and his second wife, Joanna of Aragon, which made her a half-sister of Alfonso II of Naples and Frederick IV of Naples.

Her father died in January 1494, and was succeeded by her half brother.

=== Queen of Naples ===
In January 1495, her half brother abdicated in favor of his son, her nephew. Joanna left Naples for Sicily with her mother and their entourage before the French occupation that year, and did not return until October, with a Venetian ship from Messina. Her mother and the king closely cooperated in casting out the French, and the successful discontinuation of the French occupation ended with her mother arranging the marriage between her and the king.

In 26 July 1496, the 17-year-old Joanna married her 29-year-old nephew, Ferdinand II, the son of her half-brother, Alfonso II. A papal dispensation had been necessary in order to conduct a wedding between an aunt and nephew. However, Ferdinand II died on 7 September of the same year. The marriage was childless.

=== Succession struggle ===
Upon the death of her spouse, he was succeeded by his uncle, Joanna's half-brother Frederick, after a struggle of succession. Her mother contested the succession and wished for Joanna to succeed her late husband to the throne. With the support of her mother, Joanna started to sign seals. Naples had had female monarchs and Joanna's succession was viewed favorable by the public, however, her mother's claim on her behalf was forcefully contested by the barons and nobility, who feared the influence of her mother and Aragon and made it impossible for Joanna and her mother to secure her succession before that of Frederick. Her mother's disappointment over the succession failure earned her the sobriquet "The Sad Queen" because of her sorrow on behalf of her daughter.

The relationship between Frederick and Joanna and her mother was strained. Frederick granted the cities and lands of Sorrento, Massa and Vico to Joanna in an attempt to pacify her and her mother's discontent. She retired from Naples with her mother to Poggioreale and San Sebastian by Vesuvius and did not return to court until November. King Frederick reportedly feared that Joanna would marry someone who would support her claims to the throne against him.

Joanna settled with her mother in her position as queen dowager, and the two queen dowagers where referred to as Joanna the Elder and Joanna the Younger. In 1499, her mother suggested a marriage between her and Ferdinand, Duke of Calabria, but it did not materialize. In 1499, she accompanied her mother to a visit to her maternal uncle Ferdinand II of Aragon.

In 1501, Joanna met her half sister Beatrice of Naples, queen dowager of Hungary, for the first time, when she returned to Naples from Hungary.

=== Later life ===
During the French invasion of Naples in 1501, Joanna and her mother fled to Palermo in Sicily, where they lived during the French occupation of Naples under the protection of Joanna's maternal uncle, Ferdinand II of Aragon. In 1504, the Kingdom of Naples was turned over to Aragon.

Joanna was a renowned beauty, and her new position under the protection of the king of Aragon also made her attractive on the dynastic marriage market, and she received several proposals.

King Henry VII of England lost his wife, Elizabeth of York, on 11 February 1503. At age 46, he was interested in taking a second wife and (the still young) Joanna was suggested as a potential bride by her aunt, Isabella I of Castile, who probably wanted to divert Henry's interest from her daughter, Catherine of Aragon. Lacking a portrait of Joanna, Henry sent ambassadors to Naples in 1505 to report on the physical qualities of the prospective bride.

Henry's questions, and the ambassador's answers, were mentioned by Francis Bacon in his 1622 biography, The Historie of the Raigne of King Henry The Seventh. A document containing the questions and answers was published in London, 250 years after the fact, as "Instructions given by King Henry the Seventh, to his embassadors, When he intended to marry the young Queen of Naples: together with the answers of the embassadors". The 1761 book lists "Articles" in sequential Roman numerals, each "Article" followed by an "Answer" - sought by Henry dealt with all aspects of Joanna's appearance: the color of her hair, the condition of her teeth, the size and shape of her nose, the complexion of her skin, whether she had hair on her upper lip. Article XVI instructed the ambassadors to note "hir brestes... whether they be bigge or smale." The ambassadors told the king that Joanna's breasts "be somewhat great & fully, and in as much as that they were trussed somewhat high after the manner of (the) country, which causes her Grace for to seem much the fuller and her neck to be the shorter."

The ambassador's report on Joanna's appearance was satisfactory, but the marriage negotiations failed for political and financial reasons.

In 1506, she and her mother returned to Naples in the company of Ferdinand of Aragon and his second queen Germaine de Foix. Joanna settled with her mother, her half sister Beatrice and Isabella of Aragon, Duchess of Milan with their own household in the Castel Capuano in Naples. They were provided with a generous allowance from her maternal uncle Ferdinand of Aragon. In 1508, she and her mother nursed queen dowager Beatrice, and benefited from her will later that year.

Joanna never remarried. In 1510, her uncle Ferdinand of Aragon planned to arranged a marriage for her to Charles III of Savoy, and collected taxes in Naples to fund the wedding, but the plans never materialized.

Joanna died a couple of months after her mother. She was taken ill suddenly after a trip to Puglia. Joanna lived most of her life in the shadow of her mother, who was described as a dominant personality and the driving force in her life, acting as her companion her entire life, and the information of Joanna herself is somewhat scarce.

== Sources ==
- Berzeviczy Albert: Beatrix magyar királyné (1457–1508), Athenaeum, Budapest, 1908. URL: Lásd Külső hivatkozások
- Doria, Piero. "Giovanna d'Aragona, regina di Napoli". L'enciclopedia italiana (in Italian)

Royal titles
Preceded by Joanna of Aragon	Queen consort of Naples; 1496	Succeeded by Isabella del Balzo
