= Joanna of Aragon, Queen of Naples =

Queen consort of Naples

Joanna of Aragon

Queen consort of Naples
- Tenure: 1476 – 25 January 1494
- Born: 16 June 1455; Barcelona, Catalonia, Spain
- Died: 9 January 1517 (aged 61); Naples, Italy
- Spouse: Ferdinand I of Naples
- Issue: Joanna, Queen of Naples; Charles of Naples
- House: House of Trastámara
- Father: John II of Aragon
- Mother: Juana Enríquez

Joanna of Aragon (Spanish: Juana, Italian: Giovanna; 16 June 1455 – 9 January 1517) was Queen of Naples as the second wife of King Ferdinand I. She served as regent (General Lieutenant) of Naples between the abdication and flight of her husband's son Alfonso II on 22 February 1495 until the formal succession of Alfonso's son, Ferdinand II.

Born in Barcelona, Joanna was the second child of King John II of Aragon by his second wife, Juana Enríquez de Córdoba, and his youngest legitimate child.

== Queenship ==
King Ferdinand I of Naples, an illegitimate son of her uncle Alfonso V of Aragon, asked Joanna's hand in marriage from John II and he accepted. After the wedding on 14 September the contract was signed in Navarre, on 5 October 1476 and the agreement was ratified on 25 November. John II gave his daughter a dowry of 100,000 gold florins and Ferdinand gave his new wife many duchies and/or cities, such as Sorrento, Theano, Isernia, Teramo, Sulmona, Francavilla and Nocera.

He also gave her more than 20,000 ducats annually. Alfonso, Duke of Calabria, eldest son of the king from his first marriage, sailed to Spain on 11 June 1477 in order to bring Joanna to Naples. She arrived on 1 September 1477. The formal wedding, with both the bride and groom present, took place on 14 September 1477 and was officiated by Rodrigo Borgia, the future Pope Alexander VI. Their first child was born in 1479 and another child arrived in 1480.

Joanna showed a tendency to resolve political affairs. In August 1485, she started to randomly journey through Italy, probably to ensure loyalty to her husband in the wake of rebellions led by Baron Antonello Sanseverino and supported by Pope Innocent VIII and Cardinal Giulio della Rovere. A few years later, after the conspiracy was suppressed, Joanna returned to Abruzzo, accompanied by her daughter Joanna. They visited most of the monasteries in L'Aquila that year.

== Queen Dowager ==
On 25 January 1494, Ferdinand I died aged 71. He was succeeded by his eldest son Alfonso, and step-son of Joanna, who became queen dowager. From this point on, Joanna signed every letter with the phrase the sad queen (Old Italian: la triste reyna). Because of the grief, she did not even attend her step-son's coronation on 8 May 1494. In return, Alfonso gave his step-mother the position of Lieutenant General of the Kingdom of Naples.

Meanwhile, King Charles VIII of France was about to conquer Naples. Doing the last desperate thing he could, Alfonso II abdicated in favour of his son, who became Ferdinand II of Naples. However, before he left, he advised his son to take the advice of the queen dowager in consideration and never do anything to upset her. She was formally appointed to the post of regent with the title general lieuntenant.

When Charles VIII was about to enter Sicily, Ferdinand II took Joanna and her daughter Joanna (who was also to be his wife) and left. After their return on 13 October 1495, Joanna arranged a marriage between her daughter Joanna and King Ferdinand II. They were married on 28 February 1496. However Ferdinand II died of malaria in October of the same year and Joanna was left a childless widow aged seventeen. By now, the young Joanna also signed every letter with the sad queen.

Joanna tried to suggest her brother, King Ferdinand II of Aragon as the rightful King of Naples, but a younger step-son from Ferdinand I's first marriage, Prince Frederick, was chosen. Initially, the new king's relationship with Joanna was quite cold. In fact, when Frederick's reign began, Joanna resigned her position as lieutenant general and expressed her desire to move to Aversa. After a year of absence, she returned from Aversa and regained her position as lieutenant general. But, she once again found differences, this time with Isabella del Balzo, Frederick's wife. She did not attend Frederick's coronation.

After they were once again banished from the kingdom, Joanna and her daughter Joanna returned to Naples, where Joanna died following a short illness on 9 January 1517. Her daughter Joanna died the following year from the same illness.

== Issue ==
With her husband, Joanna had two children, one of whom survived childhood:

- Joanna of Naples (20 April 1479 – 27 August 1518), who married her half-nephew, King Ferdinand II of Naples but had no children.
- Charles of Naples (Italian: Carlo, Spanish: Carlos; 1480 – 26 October 1486), died aged six of typhus.

== Succession ==
Joanna of Aragon House of Trastámara Cadet branch of the Anscarids Born: 16 June 1454 Died: 9 January 1517
Italian royalty
Preceded by Isabella of Clermont	Queen consort of Naples; 14 September 1476 – 25 January 1494	Succeeded by Joanna of Naples
