= War of Ferrara =

War of Ferrara can refer to:

- War of Ferrara (1308–1313)
- War of Ferrara (1482–1484)
