= Isabella del Balzo =

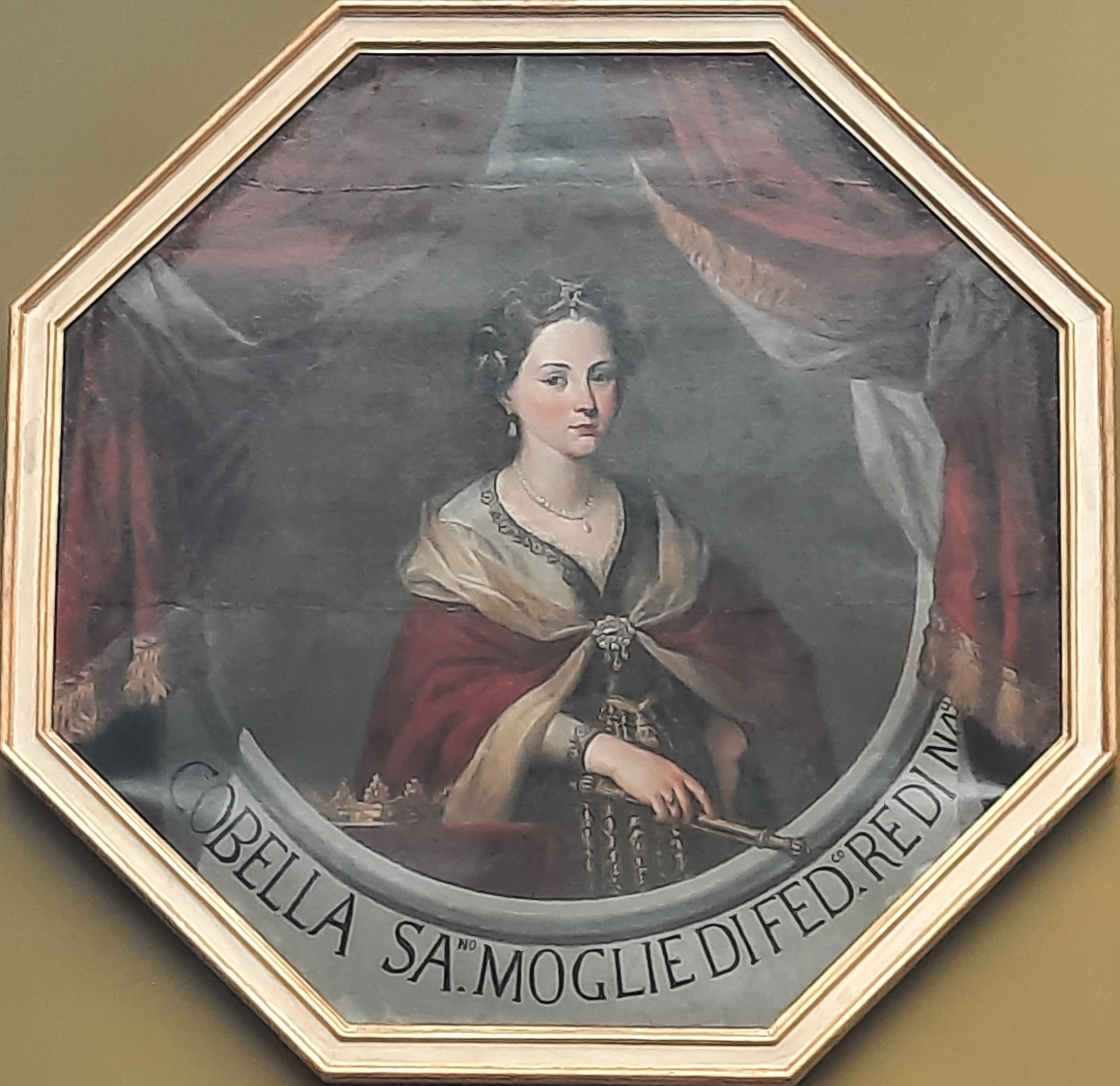

Queen consort of Naples
- Tenure: 7 September 1496 – 1 August 1501
- Born: 24 June 1465; Minervino Murge
- Died: 1533 (aged 67–68); Ferrara
- Spouse: Frederick of Naples
- Issue: Ferdinand, Duke of Calabria; Giulia; Alfonso; Isabella; Cesare
- House: Baux
- Father: Pirro del Balzo
- Mother: Maria Donata Orsini

Isabella of Balzo (24 June 1465 – 1533) was a Queen consort of Naples. She was the second consort and only Queen consort of Frederick of Naples. Isabella was also suo jure Duchess of Andria and Venosa and Princess of Altamura.

== Biography ==
Isabella was the daughter of Pirro del Balzo, Duke of Andria and Prince of Altamura, and Maria Donata Orsini of Venosa. Pietro had served as Grand Constable of the Kingdom of Naples but had been strangled to death in 1487. Isabella was in 1483 engaged to the heir of Naples, Francis, but he died prior to their wedding. Her father was imprisoned for having participated in a plot against the monarch. Isabella was by then engaged to the next heir to the crown of Naples, Frederick. The purpose of the marriage was to annex the territories of her parents in to the Kingdom of Naples. In the marriage contract, she was declared to be the heir of her parents' territories, despite the fact that she was not their eldest child, which meant that her fiefs were to be inherited by her issue and then further in to the Neapolitan royal house.

On 28 November 1487 in Andria, Isabella married Prince Frederick of Naples. He was the second son of Ferdinand I of Naples and his first consort, Isabella of Clermont. Upon marriage, she was declared Duchess regnant of Andria and Venosa and Princess regnant of Altamura. After the wedding she therefore remained in the Castle of Andria in Apulia, rather than joining the royal court of Naples. In 1495, during the war against France, Isabella was ordered by Frederick to seize control over the Castle of Bari and repair its fortifications, which she did. She managed the administration of the territory and its taxation, and also entered into negotiations with the French. She was however forced to flee to Brindisi, and later joined her consort in Otranto, before settling down in Lecce.

On 7 September 1496, Frederick succeeded his childless nephew Ferdinand II of Naples. Isabella became his Queen consort for five years. At the time of his succession, Isabella was in Lecce. She was told of his succession on 12 October, and asked to join him in Naples. She traveled toward Naples by many of the cities in the kingdom, where she received celebrations of herself as queen. She was however forced to stay on her way in Arienzo after a rebellion had erupted, and reached Naples in October 1497. Not until February 1498 was she able to reunite with Frederick as queen in Naples. A combination of King Louis XII of France and King Ferdinand II of Aragon had continued the claim of Louis' predecessor, King Charles VIII of France, to Naples and Sicily. In 1501 their alliance deposed Frederick; Naples initially went to Louis.

Frederick and Isabella spent the following years in exile. Isabella initially escaped to Ischia with her children in August 1501, but later followed Frederick to France, where he was given an allowance. In 1503, they moved to the Duchy of Maine. Frederick died in Tours on 9 November 1504. His death gave Isabella grave financial difficulties. Isabella found a refuge for herself and younger children in the Duchy of Ferrara under the protection of Frederick's nephew Alfonso d'Este, and lived there until her death, never remarrying. She spent her later life in poverty and relied on charity from relatives. In 1526, she asked for help from the pope to support her daughters.

Isabella was portrayed by Baldassare Castiglione as an ideal example of a woman and a queen to have bravely endured her many strikes by faith.

== Issue ==
Isabella and Ferdinand had:

- Ferdinand of Aragón, Duke of Calabria (15 December 1488 – 1550). Married first Germaine of Foix (her third marriage) and secondly Mencía de Mendoza.
- Julia (1492 – 10 March 1542). Married John George of Montferrat.
- Alfonso (1499–1515)
- Isabella (1500-1550)
- Cesare (1501–1501/03)

== Sources ==
- Commire, Anne, ed. (2000). "Isabella del Balzo". Women in World History: A Biographical Encyclopedia. Vol. 7. Yorkin Publications.
- Walsh, Richard J. (2005). Charles the Bold and Italy (1467-1477): Politics and Personnel. Liverpool University Press.

Isabella del Balzo House of Baux Born: 24 June 1465 Died: 1533
Royal titles
Preceded by Joan of Naples	Queen consort of Naples; 7 September 1496–1501	Succeeded by Anne of Brittany
