= Ferdinand, Duke of Calabria =

Neapolitan prince

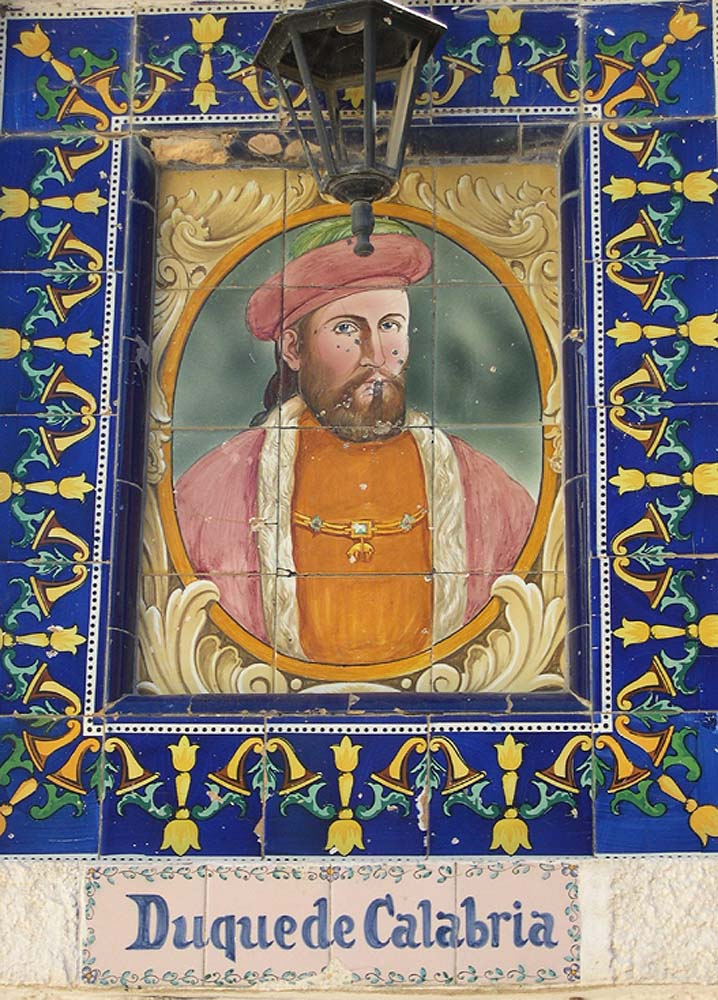

Ferdinand, Duke of Calabria (Spanish: Fernando de Aragón, Duque de Calabria) (15 December 1488 – 20 October 1550) was a Neapolitan prince who played a significant role in the Mediterranean politics of the Crown of Aragon in the early 16th century.

Coat of arms of Ferdinand, Duke of Calabria

== Life ==
Born in Andria, Apulia as the son of the future King Frederick and his second wife, Isabella del Balzo. He held the titles of Duke of Calabria and of Apulia.

An alliance of Louis XII of France and Ferdinand II of Aragon (Frederick's cousin) had continued the claim of Louis's predecessor, Charles VIII, to the thrones of Naples and Sicily, and in 1501 they deposed Frederick, and Naples initially went to Louis, but by 1504 a new war led to Naples' seizure by Ferdinand of Aragon.

Ferdinand was then taken prisoner by Gonzalo Fernández de Córdoba, and was moved to Barcelona as a hostage. Nevertheless, he gained the King of Aragon's friendship and later that of his grandson and successor Charles. Charles even arranged Ferdinand's marriage in 1526 to Germaine of Foix, Ferdinand of Aragon's widow and Charles' step-grandmother. He designated them as joint viceroys of Valencia in 1537.

After Queen Germaine's death on 15 October 1536, Ferdinand married the cultivated widow Mencía de Mendoza in 1541. They became renowned for their patronage of artistic and literary works.

== Ancestry ==
Ancestors of Ferdinand, Duke of Calabria

8. Alfonso V of Aragon
4. Ferdinand I of Naples
9. Giraldona Carlino
2. Frederick of Naples
10. Tristan of Clermont
5. Isabella of Clermont
11. Catherine of Taranto
1. Ferdinand, Duke of Calabria
12. Francesco II del Balzo, Duke of Andria
6. Pirro del Balzo, Duke of Andria
13. Sancia, Countess of Copertino
3. Isabella del Balzo
14. Gabriele Orsini, Count of Ugento
7. Maria Donata Orsini
15. Giovanna Ippolita Caracciolo

== See also ==
- Kingdom of Sicily
- Kingdom of Naples
- Kingdom of Valencia
- History of Italy

== Sources ==
- Bernadette Nelson, The court of Don Fernando de Aragón, Duke of Calabria in Valencia, c.1526–c.1550: music, letters and the meeting of cultures. Oxford University Press. Early Music, Volume 32, Number 2, May 2004, pp. 194–224(31)
- Maricarmen Gómez, "San Miguel de los Reyes y la capilla musical de Don Fernando de Aragón, duque de Calabria (1488-1550)", in San Miguel de los Reyes: De Biblioteca Real a Biblioteca Valenciana (Valencia, Generalitat, 2000 ISBN 84-482-2410-8), 91-111
