= Frederick of Naples =

King of Naples from 1496 to 1501

Frederick
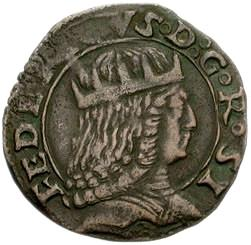
- Sestino of Frederick of Naples

King of Naples
- Reign: 7 September 1496 – 1 August 1501
- Predecessor: Ferdinand II
- Successor: Louis III
- Born: 19 April 1452; Naples, Kingdom of Naples
- Died: 9 November 1504 (aged 52); Château de Plessis-lez-Tours, Kingdom of France
- Burial: Church of Plessis-les-Tours
- Spouses: Anne of Savoy; Isabella del Balzo
- Issue more...: Charlotte, Countess of Laval; Ferdinand, Duke of Calabria
- House: Trastámara
- Father: Ferdinand I of Naples
- Mother: Isabella of Clermont

Coat of Arms

Frederick (19 April 1452 – 9 November 1504), sometimes called Frederick IV or Frederick of Aragon, was the last King of Naples from the Neapolitan branch of the House of Trastámara, ruling from 1496 to 1501. He was the second son of Ferdinand I, younger brother of Alfonso II, and uncle of Ferdinand II, his predecessor.

A combination of King Louis XII of France and Frederick's famous cousin King Ferdinand II of Aragon had continued the claim of Louis's predecessor, King Charles VIII of France, to Naples and Sicily. In 1501, they deposed Frederick; Naples initially went to Louis, but by 1504 a falling-out led to Naples' seizure by Ferdinand, after which it remained part of the Spanish possessions until the end of the War of the Spanish Succession.

== Early life and education ==
Born in Naples to Ferdinand I and his first wife, Isabella of Clermont, Princess of Taranto, he succeeded his childless nephew Ferdinand II after the latter's early death in 1496, at the age of 27.

He was baptized on 19 April 1452, in Castel Capuano and his godfather was the Emperor Frederick III, who was then sent to Alfonso the Magnanimous on a diplomatic visit.

His father ascended to the throne of Naples, upon the death of Alfonso the Magnanimous on 27 June 1458, and gave his son the best mentors: Andrea da Castelforte, Giovanni Elisio Calenzio, Girolamo Baldassare, and Offeriano Forti.

== Service to King Ferrante ==
In 1464, while residing in Taranto with his father, he was ordered to lead an escort for Ippolita Maria Sforza, eldest daughter of the Duke of Milan and fiancée of his brother Alfonso, from Milan to Naples. He left Naples on 18 March 1465 with 320 riders and learned while en route on 30 March about the death of his mother. He was received at Rome on 2 April 1465, by Pope Paul II who presented him with the golden rose. He then went to Siena and Florence, where he was received on 17 April by Lorenzo the Magnificent. He then journeyed to Milan, and stayed until 7 June, ordered by the bride to return to Naples. He followed the same route when he was stopped by the Duke of Milan, who threatened to break up the wedding in Siena until diplomacy was opened up. He returned to Naples on 14 September.

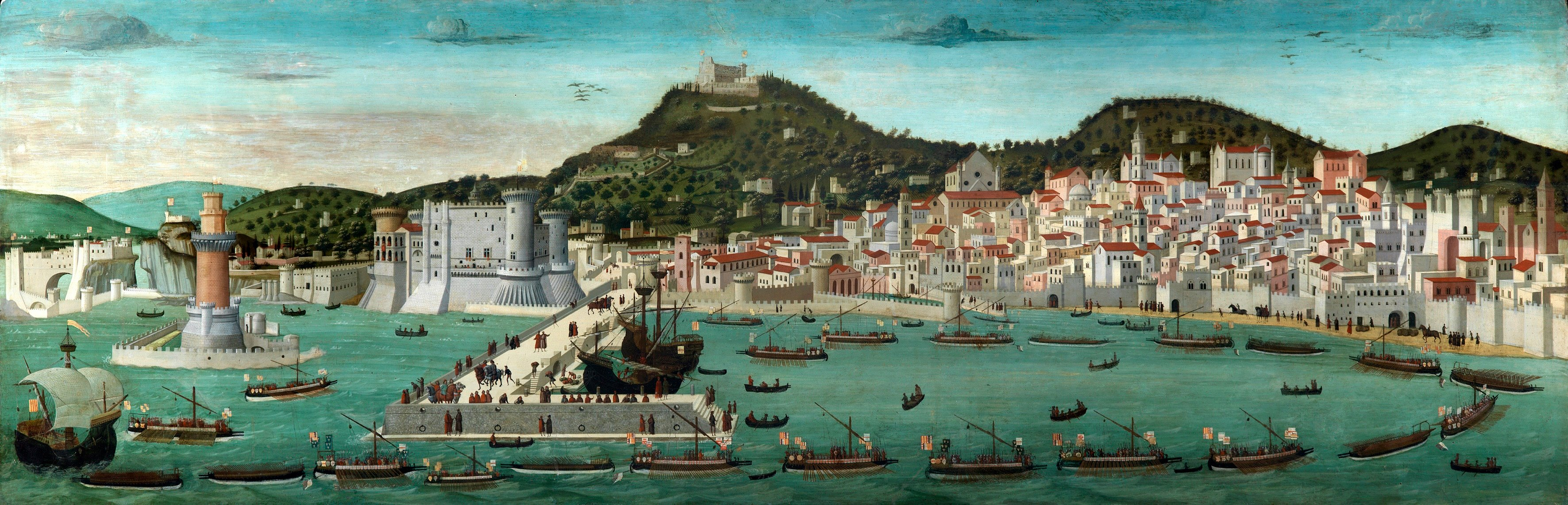
Naples in the fifteenth century. La Tavola Strozzi probably represents the triumphal entry of the fleet of Ferdinand I after the Battle of Ischia in 1465

From 1464 to 1473, he served as a lieutenant of the King of Naples in Capitanata, Terre de Bari and Terre d'Otrante, his roles receiving liege homage, overseeing the collection of taxes and enforcing trade agreements with the Republic of Venice. He also participated in the diplomatic activity that his father led, especially in receiving the lords the King of Naples wished to enter into an alliance with. He welcomed in March 1472 in Aversa and Naples, Jean della Rovere, prefect of Rome, lord of Senigallia and nephew of Pope Sixtus IV (della Rovere François), and on 30 August 1473, received Charles Manfredi, lord of Faenza.

== Diplomacy and marriage arrangements ==
As early as April 1470, Charles the Bold, Duke of Burgundy, proposed a marriage between his daughter and sole heiress (Mary of Burgundy) to Prince Frederick, heir to the throne of Naples, to cement an alliance between Burgundy and Naples. The plans took shape in November 1471, after the signing of an alliance between Charles and King Ferdinand of Naples.

As one of the richest heiresses of her time, Mary of Burgundy had many nobles attempting to marry her. The suitors included princes and lords such as Ferdinand the Catholic, Duke Nicholas I of Lorraine, Philibert of Savoy, George of England, and Charles de Guyenne. Louis XI himself expressed interest in nominating a prince of Aragon or Naples, with whom he could exchange the claims of Anjou against the Burgundian territories he sought to inherit in Maine.

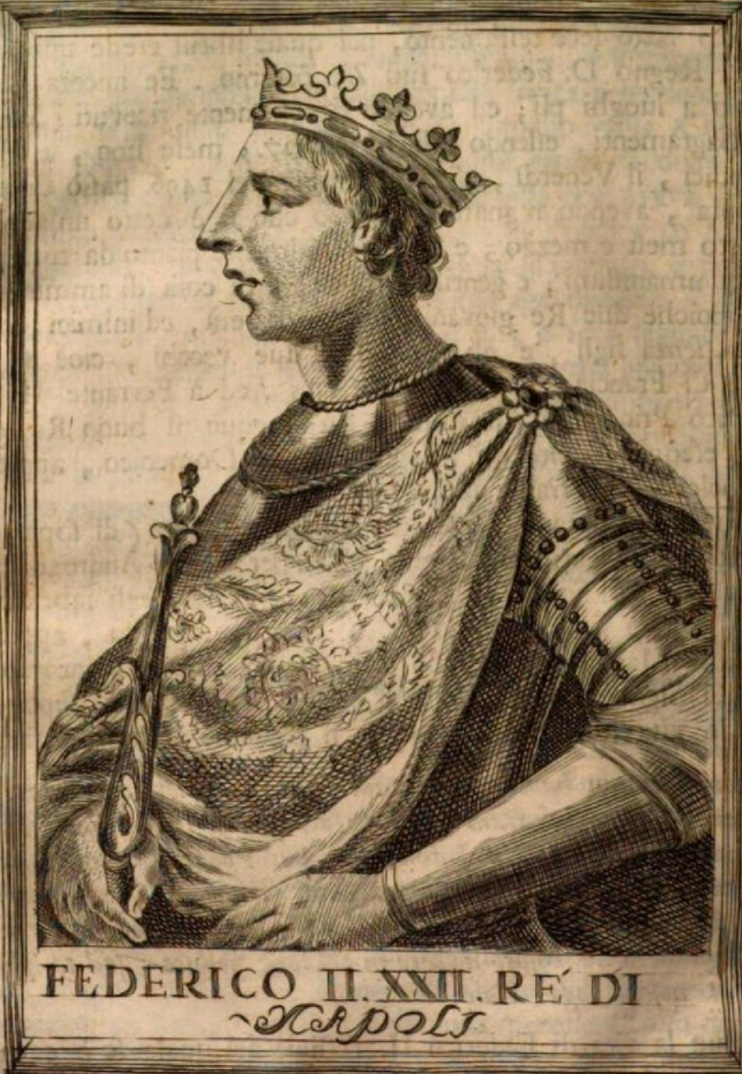
Frederick of Naples

In February 1472, King Ferdinand received Frederick with the aim to aid in the project, a Burgundian delegation insisted that Charles the Bold, for its part, had not stopped his choice. Frederick's sister Eleanor expressed confidence in the idea that the Duke of Burgundy sought to join in alliance before Easter. But these hopes were shattered during the summer when they learned, at the court of Naples, of the engagement of Mary of Burgundy to Nicholas of Lorraine, a claimant to the Kingdoms of Naples and Aragon, resulting from the alliance concluded between Charles, Duke of Burgundy and Nicholas, Duke of Lorraine on 25 May 1472, and signed by Nicholas, in turn, on 27 May 1472. Mary gave her consent to the promise of marriage on 13 June 1472, and Nicolas sent her his "Mons-en-Hainaut" the same day.

In October 1472, a new Burgundian embassy arrived at Naples reassuring about the arrangement of Mary of Burgundy and the relationship between Charles the Bold and the King of Naples. On leaving, they left behind two squires responsible for teaching Frederick better French. Charles the Bold used the eventual marriage of his daughter as an instrument of his diplomacy.

The engagement of Mary and Nicholas never came to fruition. On 5 November 1472, at the camp of Charles the Bold in Beaurevoir, Nicholas waived his promise of marriage without jeopardizing the alliance between the two dukes. Mary renounced her betrothal on 3 December.

In 1473, due to both sides failing to meet the commitments of the alliance, along with the rumor of Charles's reckless plan to marry his daughter to Maximilian, the son of Emperor Frederick III, King Ferdinand began exploring the possibility of a union between Frederick and Joanna, daughter of John II of Aragon. He also raised the possibility of a marriage with a daughter of Luca Sanseverino, Prince of Bisignano, before returning to his original wedding arrangements.

== At the court of Charles the Bold ==
King Ferdinand decided to promote the possibility of marriage between Frederick and the daughter of Charles the Bold and sought any opportunity that would require the Duke of Burgundy to accept the offer. On 26 November 1474, in Foggia, Ferdinand gave Francesco Bertini, Bishop of Capaccio, as ambassador to the court of Burgundy, full powers to conduct the negotiations. On 28 November, Alphonse, Duke of Calabria, was confirmed as an ambassador for the negotiations by his father and his brother the bishop of Capaccio.

Frederick left Naples on 26 October 1474, with a princely retinue and many visits in Italy, awaited the opportunity to go to Dijon. He was received in Rome, Urbino, and Ferrara with his brother-in-law Ercole d' Este. On 5 January 1475, accompanied by 400 members of his retinue, he was welcomed by the Doge of Venice Pietro Mocenigo in an elaborate reception, during which the delegations of the Serenissima Republic were welcomed at Bucentaure.

The opportunity to join the court of Charles the Bold was furnished by the signing of a military agreement between Charles and Galeazzo Maria Sforza on 30 January. In early February, he left Milan for Turin where Yolande de France, who was the major broker of the alliance between the Dukes of Burgundy and Milan, entrusted him as the master of arms and archery. He was stationed at Besançon at the end of February, when Charles the Bold besieged Neuss.

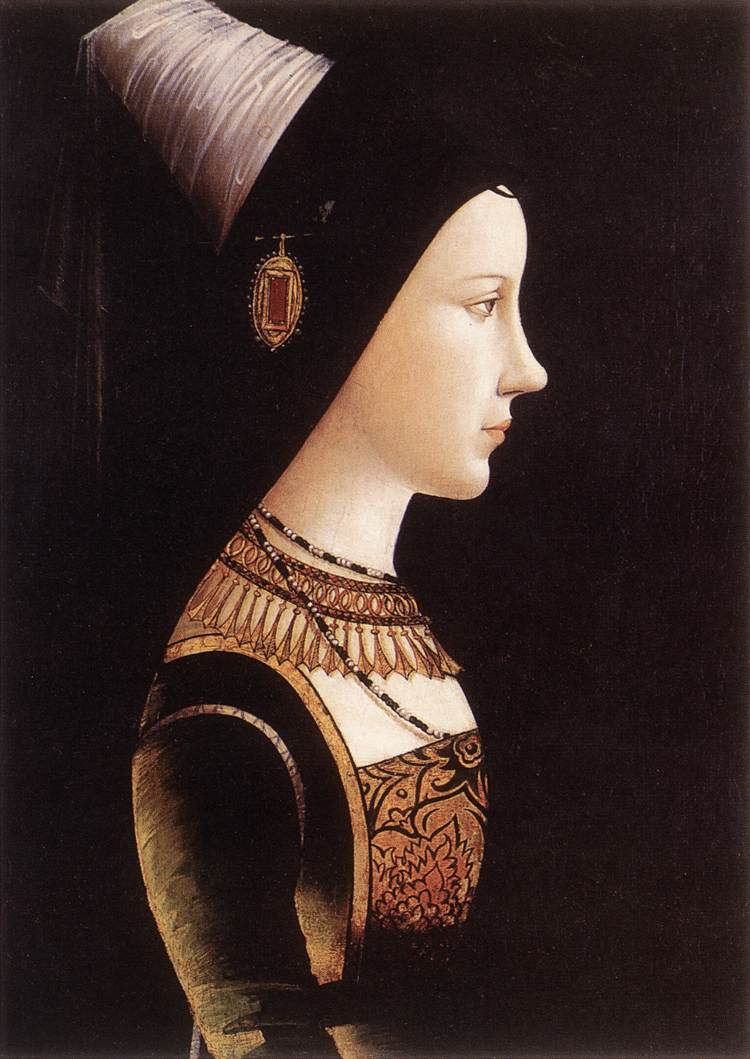
Portrait of Mary of Burgundy c. 1490, perhaps by Michael Pacher

News spread quickly among the Italian courts, and Guy de Brimeu, counselor of the Duke of Burgundy, was particularly surprised about the developing news of the marriage. Ferdinand knew that the wedding plans were fluctuating and subject to political uncertainties and questions, and this was even more true elsewhere like in the Court of Burgundy. He confided in his son with two major tasks: the first was to give to Charles the Bold the collar of the Order of the Ermine he had created, and welcome him to the Order of the Golden Fleece, the second was to replace, in the entourage of Charles, Nicola di Monforte Pietravalle, Count of Campobasso, a former vassal of Ferdinand who served René of Anjou and had ties to John of Calabria, who recruited mercenaries in Piedmont, Lombardy and Emilia to serve in the army of Burgundy.

While Frederick of Aragon arrived at the court of Burgundy, Antoine de Bourgogne, the half- brother of Charles the Bold, set off to Naples with his son Philippe, François d'Este, an illegitimate son of Lionel Este and Guillaume de Rochefort and a hundred men to submit to King Ferdinand the collar of the Order of the Golden Fleece in which he was admitted to the Chapter of Valenciennes in 1473 at the request of Charles the Bold. Arriving at Mechelen around 15 February, Antoine de Bourgogne stayed at Moncalieri from 4 to 6 March at the Duchess Yolande's estate. He likely met with Frederick at this time at the estate of Chambéry.

Antoine de Bourgogne was received at the Milanese court from 9 to 16 March 1475, then traveled to Naples where he was welcomed by the Duke of Calabria Alphonse on 15 April. On 20 April, King Ferdinand was ordained in the Order of the Golden Fleece, and had sworn to abide by its statutes. The arrival of the Burgundian embassy became an occasion for great festivities including jousts.

== Court of Louis XI ==
In the summer of 1479, Frederick married Anne of Savoy, daughter of Amadeus IX, Duke of Savoy, and Yolande of France. He lived with his young wife at the court of her maternal uncle, King Louis XI of France. After the death of his wife in 1480, he returned to Naples.

In 1485, Frederick received the title of Prince of Squillace, and was sent by his father on several diplomatic missions.

== King of Naples ==
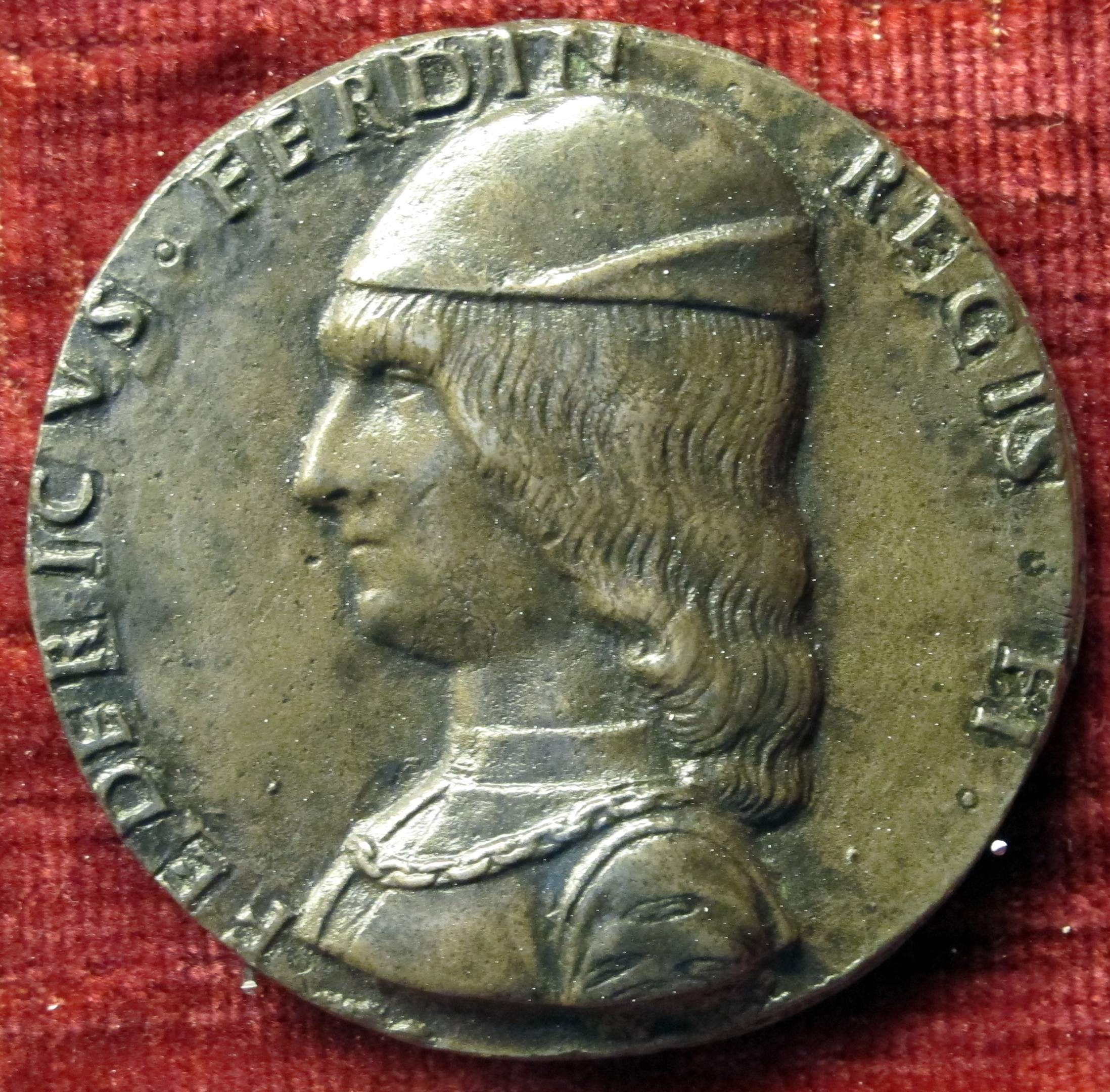
Coin with the image of Frederick

He succeeded his nephew as king and soon was forced to fight the claims of Louis XI 's successor, King Charles VIII of France, to his kingdom. He was crowned on 26 June 1497. Louis XII of France took these claims on his own and began the conquest of the kingdom from 1499 to 1501. Frederick had to call upon his cousin Ferdinand II, King of Aragon, to repel the French, but the latter, after defeating Louis XII, retained the kingdom for himself. Stripped of his dominions, Frederick was forced to implore the generosity of the King of France, who had made him an annuity of thirty thousand pounds on the duchy of Anjou.

== Loss of Naples ==
The representatives of Louis XII of France and those of Ferdinand and Isabella of Spain signed a secret treaty in Granada on 11 November 1500. The French and Aragonese sovereigns agreed to attack the Kingdom of Naples, conquer it and immediately divide it between themselves. Louis XII would receive Naples, Terra di Lavoro and Abruzzo and the titles of King of Jerusalem and King of Naples; Ferdinand of Aragon would become Duke of Apulia and Duke of Calabria. Each of the two sovereigns sought the endorsement of Pope Alexander VI, the overlord of these hypothetical territories.

In Malaga, Ferdinand armed a fleet of 50 vessels carrying 1,200 horses and 8,000 infantry under the command of Gonzalo de Córdoba. These forces sailed to support the Venetians in the battles against the Turks, then returned after the campaign around 1500–1501 to Sicily. French and Aragonese forces occupied Naples in 1501.

== Death ==
In August 1501, Naples fell to the invading French army forcing Frederick, now in Blois, to negotiate with Louis XII of France. In return for an annual pension and the county of Maine, he forfeited his rights to Naples. Frederick accompanied Louis into Italy, but returned to Tour in March 1503. He died in Tours in 1504.

== Marriages and children ==
Frederick married twice. His first wife was Anne of Savoy—daughter of Amadeus IX, Duke of Savoy, and Yolande of Valois, daughter of Charles VII, King of France—whom he married on 11 September 1478, in Milan. With Anne he had one daughter:

- Charlotte (1480–1506), who married Guy XVI, Count of Laval

His second wife was Isabella del Balzo. He also had five children from his second marriage to Isabella:

- Ferdinand, Duke of Calabria (15 December 1488 – 1550), who married first Germaine of Foix (her third marriage) and secondly Mencía de Mendoza
- Julia (1492 – 10 March 1542), who married John George of Montferrat
- Isabella (1496–1550)
- Alfonso (1498–1515)
- Caesar (1502–1520)

== See also ==
- Book of hours of Frederick of Aragon

== Sources ==
- Yvard, Catherine (2021). "A Heraldic Dream: the Treatise on Blazon of Frederick of Araon, last King of Naples". In Gras, Samuel; Legaré, Anne-Marie (eds.). Lumières du Nord: Les manuscrits enluminés français et flamands de la Bibliotheque nationale d'Espagne. Septentrion Presses Universitaires.

Frederick of Naples House of Trastámara Cadet branch of the House of Ivrea Born: 19 April 1452 Died: 9 November 1504
| Preceded by Ferdinand II | King of Naples; 1496–1501 | Succeeded by Louis III |
