= Ferdinand II of Naples =

King of Naples from 1495 to 1496

Ferdinand II
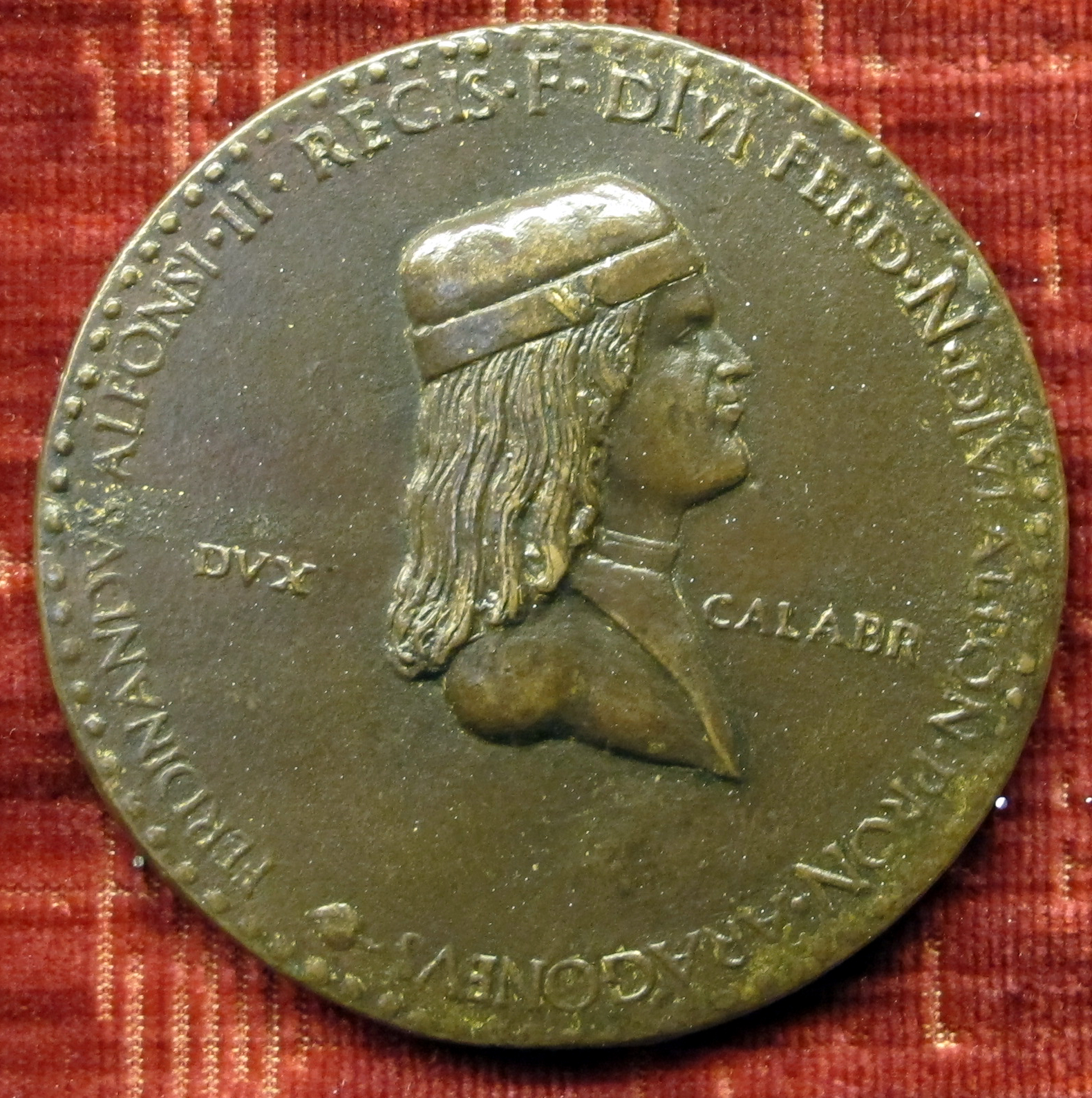
- Medal of Ferdinand as Duke of Calabria by Adriano Fiorentino

King of Naples
- Reign: 23 January 1495 – 7 September 1496
- Predecessor: Alfonso II
- Successor: Frederick
- Born: 26 June 1467; Naples, Kingdom of Naples
- Died: 7 September 1496 (aged 29); Somma Vesuviana, Kingdom of Naples
- Burial: San Domenico Maggiore
- Spouse: Joanna of Naples
- House: House of Trastámara
- Father: Alfonso II of Naples
- Mother: Ippolita Maria Sforza

Ferdinand II (Italian: Ferdinando II, also known as Ferrante II and Ferrandino; 26 June 1467 – 7 September 1496) was King of Naples from 1495 to 1496. He was the son of Alfonso II of Naples and the grandson of Ferrante I of Naples.

At the start of the Italian Wars in 1495, Alfonso abdicated in favor of his son, Ferdinand, when a French army led by Charles VIII threatened Naples. Unable to effectively defend the city, Ferdinand fled with a small retinue to the island of Ischia. Charles quickly occupied the city then split his army, leaving half of it to garrison Naples and taking the other half to return home.

By May 1495, with fresh troops and the support of Aragon allies, Ferdinand returned to the peninsula and with the assistance of the Spanish general Gonzalo Fernández de Córdoba, expelled French soldiers from the entire kingdom. He died soon thereafter, on 7 September 1496, and was succeeded by his uncle, Frederick IV.

== Biography ==
=== Birth ===
Ferdinando was born on 26 June 1467 in Castel Capuano, a residence that King Ferrante had given to his son Alfonso and his wife Ippolita Maria Sforza as a wedding gift. Ferdinando's mother, Ippolita, found herself alone to give birth, as her husband was engaged on the war front in Abruzzo to fight against the Florentines, while her father-in-law was in Terra di Lavoro. The prince's birth was nevertheless immediately greeted with great joy. The prince was baptized on 5 July and was given the names Ferdinando, in honor of his grandfather, and Vincenzo, for his mother's devotion to Saint Vincenzo Ferreri.

Thus entered into life the one who was to become the unhappy king Ferrandino. Welcomed with great joy by King Ferrante, by his family, by all Neapolitans, no pain was spared during his brief existence [...]

— Alessandro Cutolo, La nascita di Ferrandino d'Aragona.

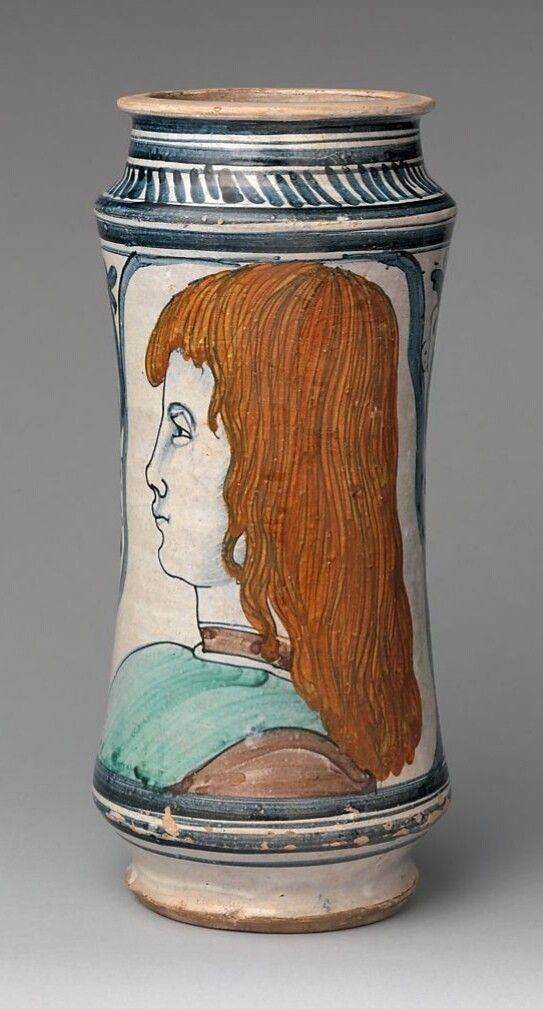
Neapolitan albarello with a probable childish portrait of Ferrandino, then Prince of Capua, circa 1475–1480

The letters of his mother dating to this period describe him as a healthy, beautiful, and capricious newborn; in fact, it is Ippolita herself who disconsolately informs her mother, Bianca Maria Visconti, that Ferdinando is "beautiful as a pearl" but "pleasant with every person except with me; I have hope in short days we will have to be domestic and friends."

=== Youth ===
He had as tutors, but also as advisors and secretaries, Aulus Janus Parrasius, Gabriele Altilio and Chariteo, who followed their pupil with dedication and loyalty even when he, still a teenager, was called to try his hand at the art of war.

Already at the age of fourteen, he had the opportunity to demonstrate his readiness in war, when, after the reconquest of Otranto, a new war front opened between Venice and Ferrara (Salt War, 1482–1484) and King Ferrante had to intervene in defense of his son-in-law Ercole I d'Este. Ferrante put his grandson Ferdinando at the head of a military expedition directed to Abruzzo, as a lieutenant of the king, with the task of defending the coasts from the attacks of the Venetian fleet. In the following years, Ferdinando continuously defended the kingdom, fighting against the rebellious barons during the second baronial revolt that, between 1485 and 1486, put King Ferrante in great difficulty.

Giovanni Sabadino degli Arienti tells of a certain incident that took place on an unspecified day, but since the writer places it a few months before the death of Ippolita Maria Sforza, it has been traced back to when the young prince was about twenty years old. It so happened that Ferrandino "for greatness and prowess of spirit, I asked for a stout horse, that fell on him, so that he was taken away believing that he was dead". The young prince remained in a coma for 13 days until his mother Ippolita, crying and devoutly invoking the help of the Virgin with endless prayers, obtained that "the lost, or perhaps lost spirits returned to the lifeless body of the son". Although the story is far-fetched, there is indeed news from ambassadors of a ruinous fall from his horse in the summer of 1486: initially the prince seemed to have done nothing, and in fact did not want to be medicated, but then he was assailed by a great fever and was in danger of life. Since he was now considered dead and with no hope of healing, it was "opinione de tucto lo populo" that it was the "infinite orationi made the Ill.ma madamma duchessa his mother" to free him from evil. As an ex-voto, his father Alfonso had a silver image of the prince made and donated it to the Church of Santa Maria di Loreto, where he had gone to request grace.

At the death of his younger brother Pietro due to illness in 1491, he remained the last hope of Naples and of his elderly grandfather King Ferrante, who died on 25 January 1494. Alfonso II ascended to the throne of Naples and did not hesitate to declare war on Ludovico il Moro, occupying as the first act of hostility the city of Bari, a fief of the duke. Alfonso thus came to the rescue of his daughter Isabella, wife of Gian Galeazzo Maria Sforza, nephew of Ludovico, from whom his uncle had usurped the Duchy of Milan.

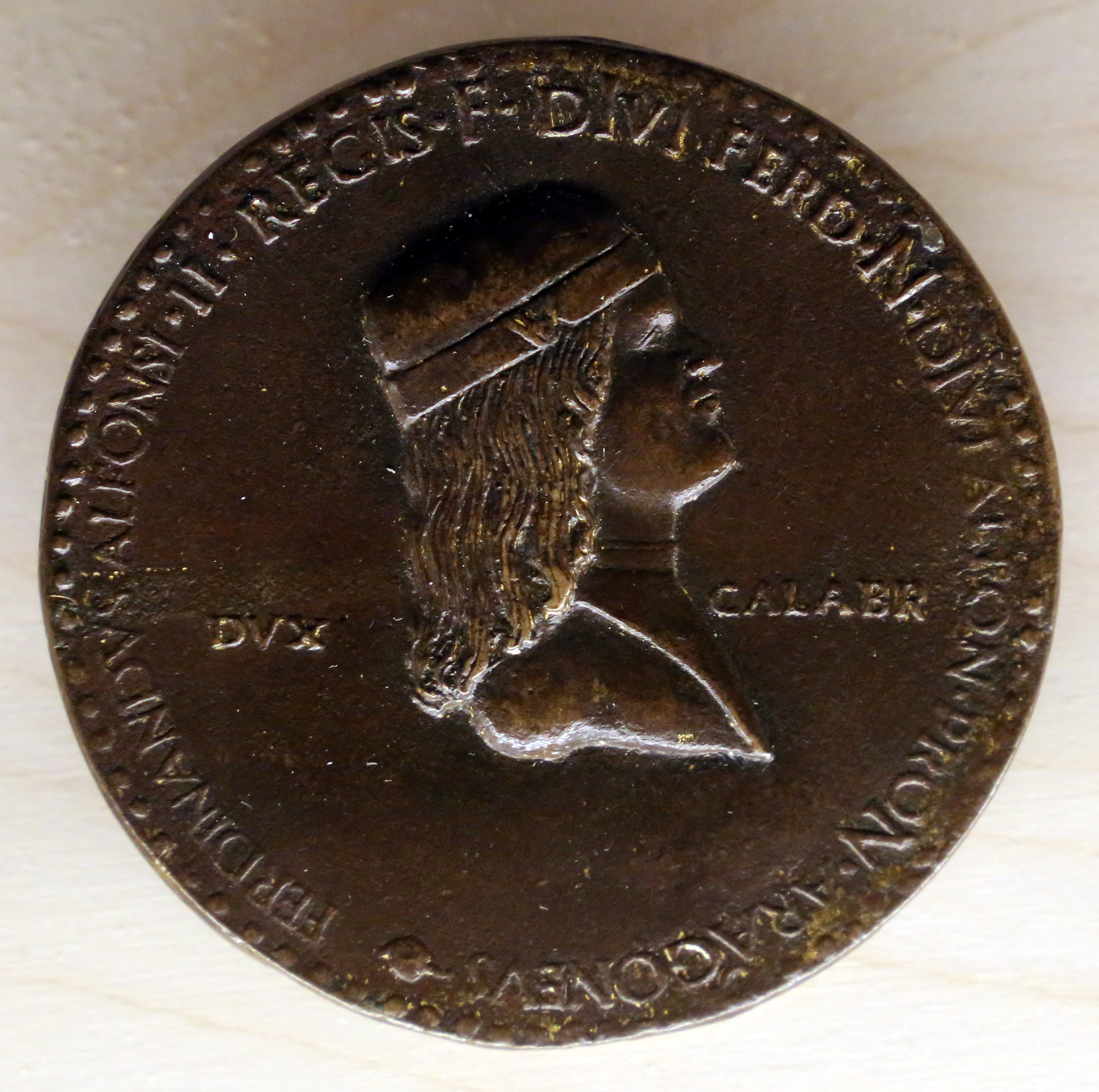
Medal of Ferrandino, Duke of Calabria, Adriano Fiorentino, dated 1494

Ludovico responded to the threat by permitting the French monarch Charles VIII to enter Italy in order to reconquer the Kingdom of Naples, which the latter believed had been usurped by the Aragonese to the Neapolitan Angevins.

Ferrandino, although very young, showed promise as supreme captain of the army of the Kingdom of Naples. In October 1494, for example, he was fighting in Romagna against the French as an ally of Caterina Sforza, Countess of Forlì. To cause the break between the two was the so-called Sack of Mordano, which took place between 20 and 21 October: around the city of Mordano the French had gathered between fourteen thousand and sixteen thousand soldiers to encircle and besiege it and at the same time to trap Ferrandino, who, having fewer men, was almost certain to be defeated.

Therefore, understanding the situation and on his generals' advice, he decided not to respond to the countess's requests for help. Caterina, very angry, passed on the side of the French, who had devastated her lands and torn her subjects, breaking the alliance with Ferrandino, having learned the news, under a diverted rain was forced to leave Faenza with his men and to get on the way to Cesena. Although they were now enemies and despite the Neapolitan army being short of food, not having been well-supplied by the countess even when they were allies, notes Leone Cobelli, a chronicler from Forlì, that Ferrandino always behaved honestly and that vice versa Countess Caterina sent his men to rob him, albeit unsuccessfully:

Those of Bertenoro and Cesena did not want to give him more provisions: where the Duke of Calabria and he were reluctant. Now note, reader, that certainly the Duke of Calabria behaved honestly in these lands and countries, and he did not do what he could have done having become our enemy. And when he was our friend he never wanted them to be damaged either in the vineyards or in the branches, and his camp was free and those who brought him provisions wanted them to be well paid, protected and honored, and I never know of a dishonesty of that. encampment: he certainly has a good reputation for it. But we have given him well credit, for people were sent after him to steal and take away horses, weapons and robes.

— Leone Cobelli, "Cronache Forlivesi"

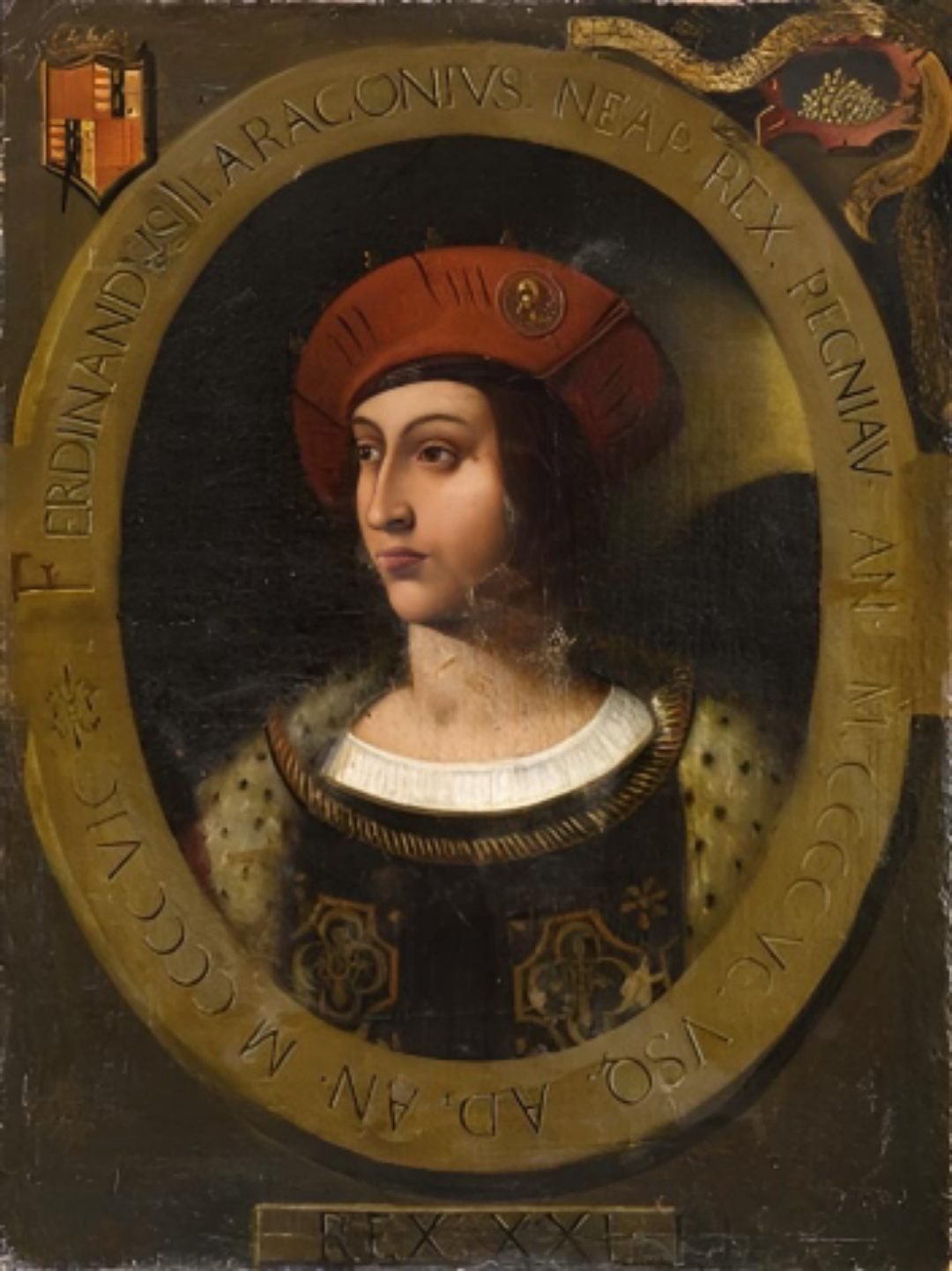
Posthumous portrait of Ferrandino, Italian school of the 17th century

Sources describe him as always impatient to clash with the French and to test his war skills. In fact, when he was still near Imola, on 16 September 1494, "with the helmet on his head and throwing it on his thigh" he went down to openly challenge the French, and seeing that the enemy did not leave the camp "he sent some crossbowmen to invite him up to half a mile below; and no one ever showed up". Two days later, not happy, he sent a herald to the enemy captain, Gianfrancesco Sanseverino d'Aragona, Count of Caiazzo, to ask him "if he wanted to come and break some spear", with a negative result. He then repeated the challenge to the French captain, Robert Stuart d'Aubigny, and the French this time accepted, but the Count of Caiazzo prevented the test from being held and Ferrandino, disappointed, had to settle for small skirmishes.

=== French invasion ===
An attempt to stop the French fleet carrying the heavy artillery at Rapallo resulted in disaster. After leaving Romagna, Ferrandino went to Rome to exhort Pope Alexander VI "to be constant and firm, and not to abandon the king his father". But the Pope, reluctantly, finally yielded to the French, though, embracing the young Ferrandino weepingly, offered him safe conduct with which he could cross undisturbed the entire Papal States so as to return to Naples. By nature proud and heedless of the danger, Ferrandino indignantly refused the escort and on the last day of the year he left Rome by the door of San Sebastiano just as King Charles VIII entered from that of Santa Maria del Popolo with the French army.

With the approach of the enemy troops, King Alfonso II, mentally unstable and persecuted, it is said, by the shadows of the killed barons, sought to ensure greater stability for the throne and for his descendants by abdicating in favor of his eldest son, and retired to monastic life at the monastery of Mazzara in Sicily. Ferrandino thus ascended to the throne of the Kingdom of Naples in 1494.

Let's go back to Ferdinand the young boy,

seen in the crowned kingdom.
Daring, youth warms his chest,
eager to save the state of him,
he made up his mind and thought this:
not wanting to be locked up in the house,
but as a new frank and powerful king

to meet the enemy people.

— Gerolamo Senese. La venuta del Re Carlo con la rotta del Taro (1496-1497). Guerre d'Italia in ottava rima (II 4.8:58)

Unlike his father, a man feared for his cruelty and hated by the Neapolitans, Ferrandino was much loved by the whole population "to be human and benign king" and as a young man of good qualities that he demonstrated immediately. Despite a deep economic crisis, he returned to their legitimate owners the lands unjustly stolen by his father for the construction of the Villa Poggio Reale and to the nuns of La Maddalena the convent that Alfonso had expropriated from them for the construction of the Villa Duchesca, and he freed many prisoners who for years had languished in the unhealthy prisons of the castle. Ferrandino remedied, in short, many of the offenses caused over the years by his father and grandfather. He had also challenged King Charles VIII to a duel to decide in the old-fashioned way who should own the kingdom, but the French monarch, knowing the skill of the young Neapolitan, chose not to face him.

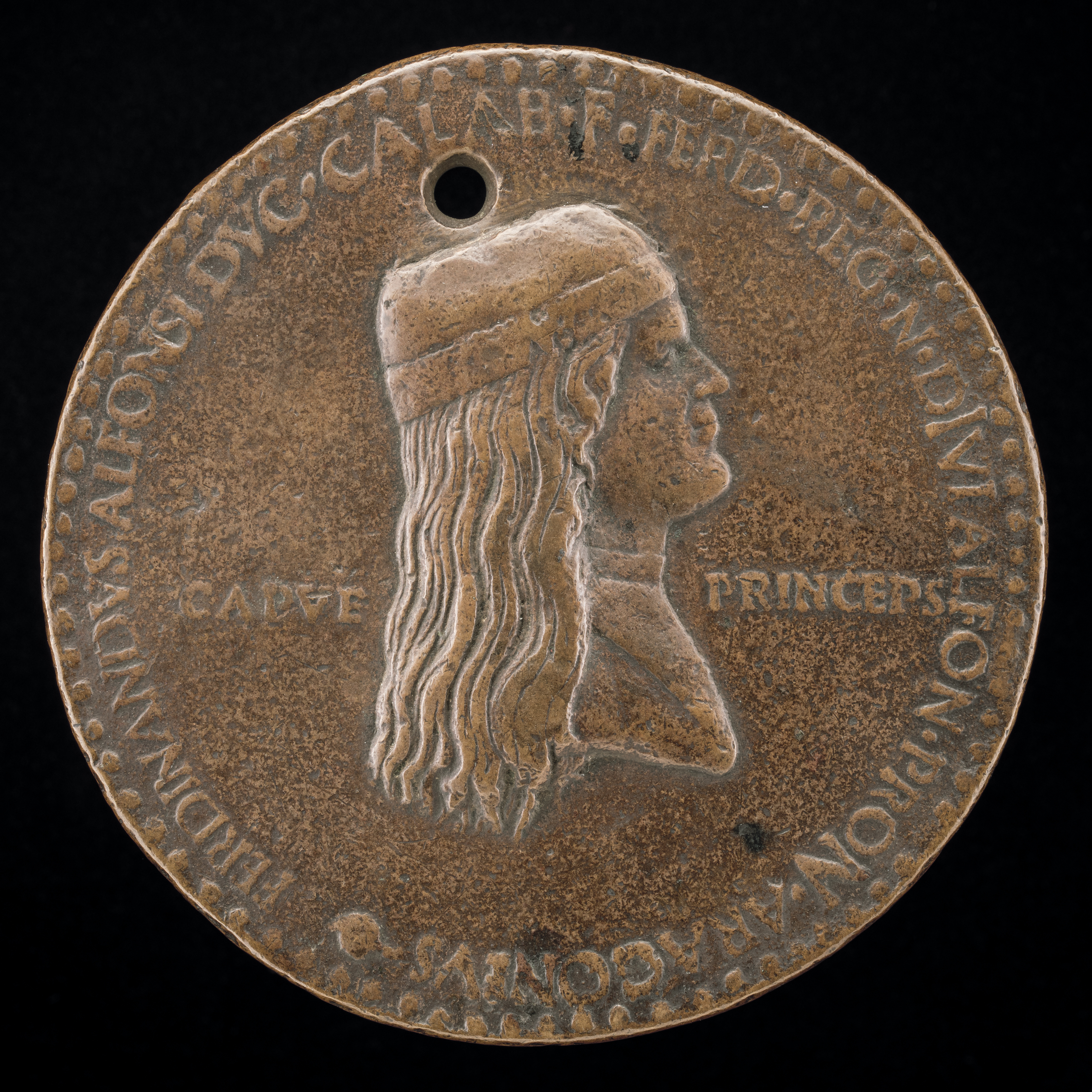
Medal of Ferrandino, prince of Capua. Adriano Fiorentino, before 1494, National Gallery of Art, Washington

A real betrayal was then consumed against Ferrandino: the cities began to give themselves spontaneously to the French and his captains and generals began to secretly plot with the enemy, favoring Charles' advance. Returning to Naples from Capua, the young king was in a very bad mood, so much so that the dowager queen Joan induced him to feed after two days of fasting. He lamented that Fortune was against him and that he was losing the kingdom "without breaking a spear." When he was then told that the people were looting his stables, he became enraged, and with a handful of men rushed to the place with the unhinged stocco and began to vehemently reproach the looters, wounding some and recovering a number of horses.

Realizing by now that the situation was irreparable, Ferrandino decided to move away from Naples in search of reinforcements. Before embarking for Ischia with his family, however, he summoned the populace and promised them that he would return within 15 days, and that, if this were not the case, they could all consider themselves freed from the oath of fidelity and obedience made towards him. He then left the new Castel in the protection of Alfonso II d'Avalos, Marquis of Pescara, and 4,000 Swiss mercenaries, and with 14 galleys led by Berardino Villamarina he fled to Ischia.

Famous remains the betrayal of the castellan of the fortress of Ischia, Justo della Candida, who made the royal family find the doors of the castle barred. Ferrandino then, under the pretext of securing at least the dowager queen Giovanna and princess Giovannella (or, according to other sources, asking to be a parliamentarian with the castellan), persuaded Justo to let him enter the fortress in the company of a single man, not believing that he alone constituted a danger. Ferrandino instead, as soon as he found himself in front of him, pulled out a dagger and "he threw himself on him with such impetus that, with the ferocity and the memory of the royal authority, he frightened the others in such a way that in his power he immediately reduced the castle and the fortress". Then, after killing him, he cut off his head with a sword blow and threw his body into the sea, thus regaining possession of the castle and the garrison.

=== Charles VIII in Naples ===
The French entered Naples on 22 February 1495 and Charles VIII took up residence in Castel Capuano, the ancient fortified palace of the Norman rulers. Now master of Naples, Charles asked to meet Prince Frederick in conversation and through him offered Ferrandino large possessions in France, provided that he renounced any claim to the Kingdom of Naples and royal dignity. Frederick, who knew well the intentions of his nephew, immediately replied that Ferrandino would never accept such an offer, since "he was deliberate to live and die as a king, as he was born".

Despite having many supporters among the Neapolitan nobles, largely nostalgic for the Angevin period, and the almost total control of the kingdom, Charles did not know how to exploit these conditions in his favor and imposed French officials at the top of all administrations.

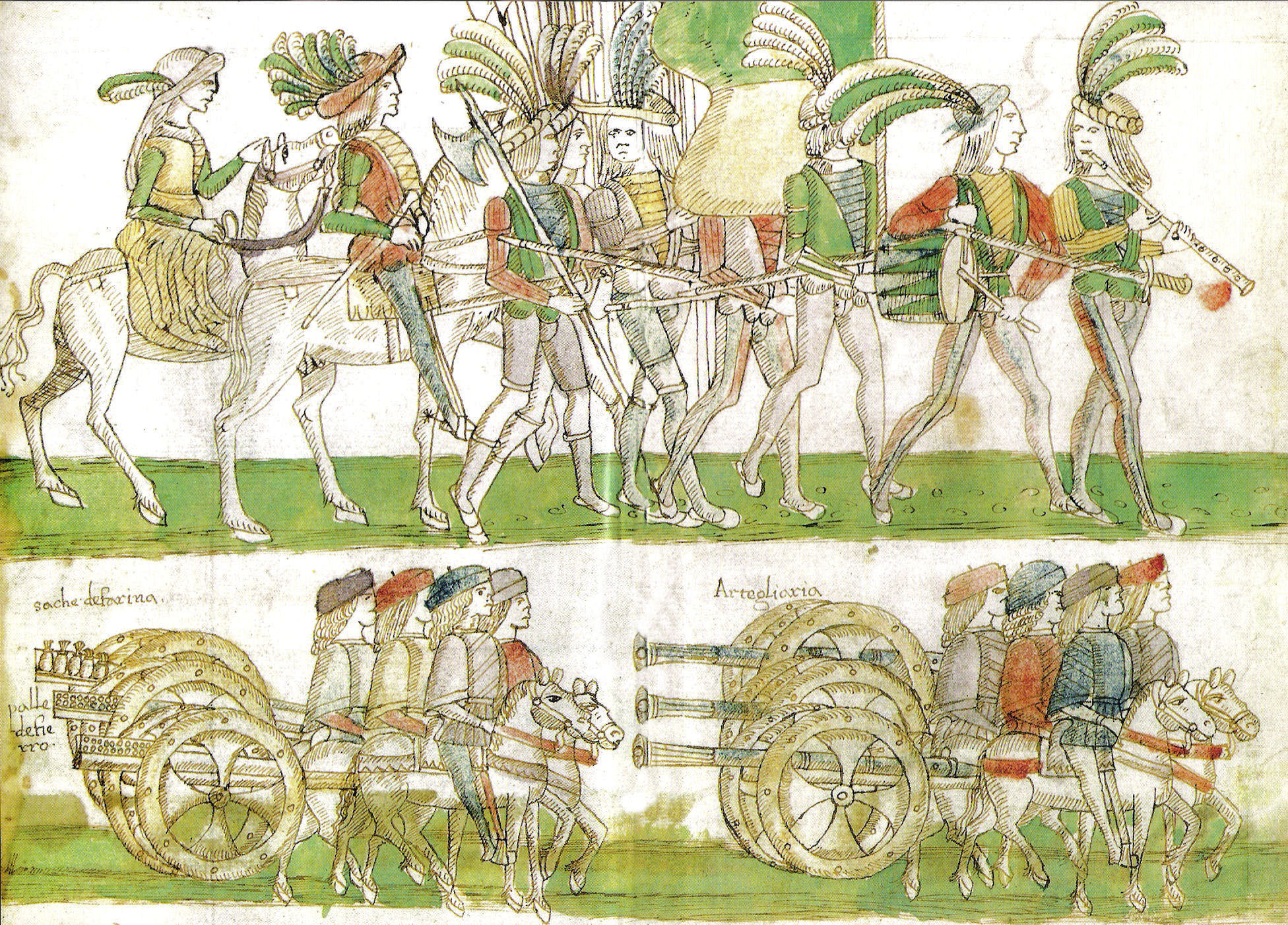
The Entry of the French into Naples (22 February 1495), from the Figurative Chronicle of the Fifteenth Century by Melchiorre Ferraiolo

The weakness of his choices, dictated by the arrogant conviction of being the undisputed master of the realm and perhaps of the entire Peninsula, gave time and strength to the other Italian states to coalesce against him and to Ferrandino to reorganize the Neapolitan armies.

At the beginning of May 1495, a heavy naval defeat at the hands of the Genoese fleet at the Second Battle of Rapallo almost totally deprived Charles of the naval support necessary for the transport of heavy artillery and other logistics of his army. In the same month the King of France, following the pro-Aragonese impulses of the Neapolitan people and the advance of Ferrandino's armies in the kingdom, understood the need to leave Naples and set out to return to his homeland, where he managed to arrive despite the defeat suffered by the forces of the anti-French league in the Battle of Fornovo.

[...] And long live King Fernando, flower of the garden,

and let the King of France die a crooked foot!
And long live King Fernando and the Crowns
and let the King of France die drunkard!
And long live the crowned King Fernando,
and let the King of France die and be quartered!
And the King of France who has pain in his calzone,
and he holds a nose like a corbellone,
And long live King Fernando and his wand,
and let the King of France and whoever awaits him die!
Long live the ever victorious army,
and the strong arm of King Fernando.
Long live the captain of Zaragoza;
Night with days never rests,
fighting the French all of them

that have plundered Ponente and Levante.

— Canzone diffusa a Napoli ai tempi della cacciata dei francesi (1495). Riportata da Anne Denis nella sua opera "Charles VIII et les Italiens".

=== Battle of Seminara and reconquest of Naples ===
Ferrandino, who in the meantime had brought himself from Ischia to Messina, joined his cousin, Ferdinand II of Aragon, King of Sicily and Spain, who offered him assistance in the reconquest of the Kingdom of Naples. The Spanish general Gonzalo Fernández de Córdoba arrived from Spain with a small army consisting of 600 lancers of the Spanish cavalry and 1,500 infantry: he had been chosen by Queen Isabella to lead the Spanish contingent both because he was a court favorite and also a soldier of considerable fame despite his young age.

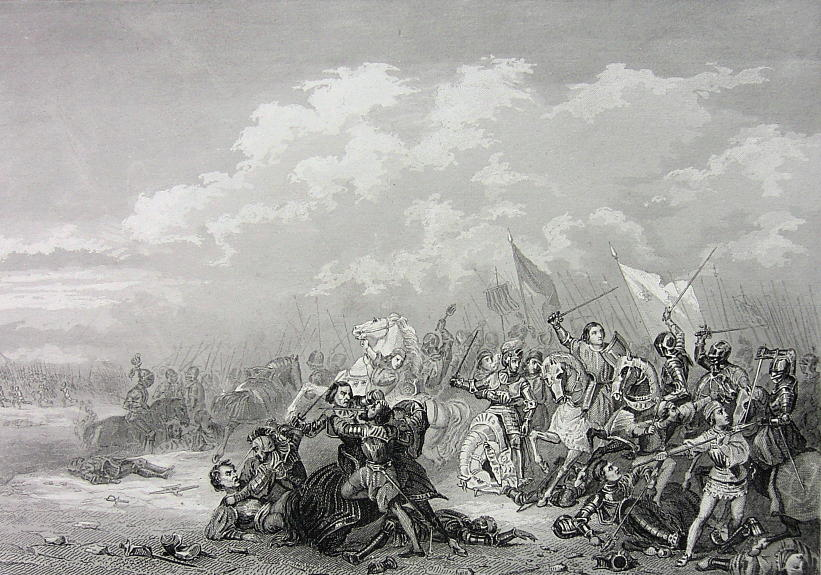
The noble John of Capua (the knight on the right with shield and sword raised) rescues Ferrandino (on the dying white horse on his left), who was unseated during the Battle of Seminara

De Córdoba arrived at the port of Messina on 24 May 1495, where he met Alfonso and Ferrandino, and then left for Calabria, where he arrived two days later. Ferrandino had earlier passed through Calabria with his army, bringing with him the fleet of Admiral Requesens, and had reoccupied Reggio. Ferrandino, rejoicing in de Córdoba's arrival, ordered that the companies pass in front, thus assaulting the French who had occupied the lands of Calabria.

Ferrandino led the allied army out of the town of Seminara on 28 June and took a position along a stream. Initially the fighting turned in favor of the allies, with the Spanish jinetes preventing the fording of the stream by the French-Swiss gendarmes by throwing their javelles and retreating, the same method used in Spain against the Moors. Ferrandino reportedly fought with great vigor, so that "it seemed that great Hector of Troy had resurrected", but the Calabrian militia panicked and retreated; although Ferrandino tried to block their escape, the retreating Calabrians were attacked by the gendarmes who eventually managed to cross the waterway, triumphiant.

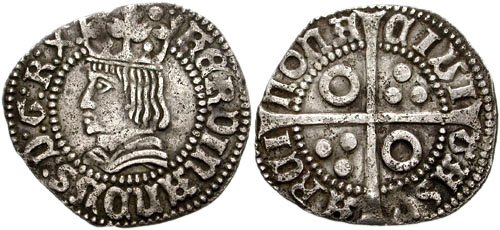
Coin of Ferdinand II

The situation soon became desperate for the allied forces: the "Scottish Estuardo", Bernard Stewart, 3rd Lord of Aubigny, Governor of Calabria, outraged by the daring of the Aragonese captain, recruited from Calabria, Basilicata and other lands of the kingdom a large number of French soldiers to challenge the king. Although the Grand Captain at first avoided the battle, he finally accepted, and arrived on the appointed day at the River of Seminara. Though he fought with great courage, King Ferrandino was easily recognized by his luxurious clothing and Aubigny killed his horse, causing him to fall to the ground. John of Capua, brother of Andrew, Count of Altavilla, helped him back on horseback and retreated while protecting him as best as possible, but the Aragonese, not being able to resist the fury of the French, returned to Reggio, and the king having realized that he had made a great mistake in having exposed in danger his person and that of all his allies, returned to his father in Messina.

Despite the victory of the French and Swiss forces on the battlefield, Ferrandino was soon able to retake Naples thanks to the loyalty of the populace. De Córdoba, using guerrilla tactics and carefully avoiding any confrontation with the fearsome Swiss battalions, slowly reconquered the rest of Calabria. Many of the mercenaries in the service of the French were not paid their promised compensation and mutinied, returning to their homeland, and the remaining French forces were trapped in Atella by the combined forces of Ferrandino and de Córdoba and forced to surrender. On 7 July, after defeating the last French garrisons, Ferrandino finally returned to Naples, where he was welcomed by the people.

=== Death and succession ===
The war against Charles VIII dragged on until the following year, but in fact the Kingdom of Naples had returned firmly into the hands of Ferrandino, who was thus able to celebrate his marriage to his aunt Giovanna. She was a half-sister of Alfonso II, born from the second marriage of King Ferrante to Joan of Aragon. At the time of the marriage, Ferrandino was 29 years old, Giovanna 18. The wedding was celebrated in Somma Vesuviana, where the royal couple decided to stop for some time and where Ferrandino appointed his wife queen, crowning her by his hand.

Immediately after, however, Ferrandino, already previously ill with malaria, which raged at that time in Calabria, saw his health deteriorate, and he was taken to the church of the Annunziata in Naples to obtain grace of health. He arrived to find a large part of the population had come to pray for him. He was later taken to Castel Nuovo.

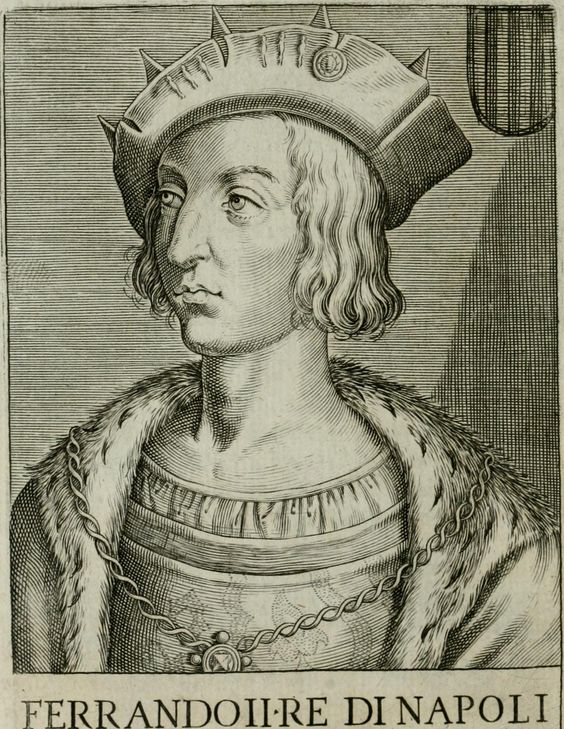
Ferrandino depicted in the work Portraits of one hundred illustrious captains by Aliprando Caprioli, 1596

In this regard, the Milanese historian Bernardino Corio writes: "Ferdinando, having recovered almost everything [...] joining his wife who was the infante of Naples his friend, sister of Alfonso on his father's side, and as in love with her, taking loving pleasure, he aggravated himself more in the beginning of illness [...] and despairing of healing he was taken to Naples, where at the age of twenty-nine with incredible pain of his subjects he abandoned life".

Ferrandino made a will in which he established Don Federico, his paternal uncle, as universal heir to the kingdom. Having then devoutly obtained the extreme anointing, he died on 7 October 1496, at Castel Capuano, where he had been transported in a litter, amid the great mourning of the people, who had led in procession relics, including the miraculous blood of San Gennaro. And again in these terms Giuliano Passaro, a saddler craftsman, describes the general condolences to his death:

What can you cry about, Neapolitan peoples, what

today you have lost your Crown; and for this they weep the moon with the stars, the stones with the earth; weep, big and small, female and male, that I believe since God made the world more pitiful what was not seen! The wretched Queen, his wife, and also his mother-in-law, cried, saying: "Where is your strength, where is your glorious fame, which in your youth you acquired with as much effort as ever prince of this century, to recover your ancient home, from which with great treachery you were driven out by King Charles of France, and you with your glorious wit and strength have regained it? And now at one point you have abandoned us, son and husband! Who are you leaving us with? " [...] Big and small beat their heads for the walls for the great pain they had for the past memory of the Lord King, saying: «O our Lord, how have you abandoned us in such a short time? Where is your gagliardia? where is your tinkering with so much prowess, that Hector or Hercules was never equal to Your Majesty; and today for your passing away you have abandoned us! " [...] And know, magnificent gentlemen, that today the most virtuous, victorious and beloved King of vassals has died, that he had ever been in this century and that he has endured so much trouble, since many times he was tried to poison him and always the fortune

he helped her and immediately the betrayal was discovered; and today he died so softly, at the end of him winning him.

— Giuliano Passaro, Libro delle cose di Napoli

Ferrandino was then buried with funeral gifts in the sacristy of San Domenico, near the tomb of his grandfather Ferrante. In the absence of direct heirs of the late king, the crown was inherited, according to his will, by his uncle Frederick, the legitimate brother of Alfonso II, who ascended to the throne as Frederick I of Naples. Frederick was the last Neapolitan king of the Aragonese dynasty, who then ceded the kingdom to the French. Following the definitive sunset of the Aragonese lineage, the laments for the premature death of Ferrandino multiplied:

If I had the son King Ferdinand,

that he was alive with me in such misfortune,
would give notice to all my worries,
but unhappy to me no one is left to me,
and I remember them weeping,
for the fountain of mercy withered to his vessel
for me, being a receptacle of torments

devoid of children and friends and relatives.

— El lamento e la discordia de Italia Universale (1510 ca.); Guerre d'Italia in ottava rima (II-10.10:14)

I am that unfortunate kingdom

full of tears, damage and war,
France and Spain at sea on land
they all desolate me.
For me every person mourns,
gentle kingdom full of troubles,
since five kings of crown
I have died in thirteen years,
with torments and severe damage.
[...] I am that unfortunate kingdom,
first King Ferrando old,
King Alfonso his son,
Ferrandino of virtue is spechio,
you have French in great pain
and King Charles with his stole
he drove off towards the west;

death took him out of the present.

— Dragoncino da Fano, El lamento del Reame di Napoli (1528). Guerre in Ottava rima (III-1.1)

== Appearance and personality ==
Since childhood Ferrandino was initiated to the arts of the body as of the intellect. Contemporary sources including Baldassare Castiglione describe him as agile and well-disposed in the person, very skilled in jumping, running, vaulting, tinkering and horseback riding, as well as in rides and tournaments, competitions in which he always reported the first honor. Nevertheless, he is described as modest: "so it was his habit that he neither rejoiced at prosperity nor troubled by sadness, with a cheerful face he gave thanks to everyone". He was valiant, of royal customs, loving, liberal and forgiving. Vincenzo Calmeta calls him a "prince of high spirit and endowed with all those graces that nature and chance can give".

[...] always this King was vigorous, kind, meek, costumed, virtuous, and truly worthy of that Realm, named the first of all the Kings and Lords of the World, as I will say. And finally she made of his person what was possible, as it is known, at the age of twenty-seven, in a very reasonable aspect. And as it is said above, crowned he mounted a horse with all his troops of arms with a heart of Caesar [...].

— Chronicon Venetum (Anonimo).

[...] a young man who manifested with arts contrary to those of his father, wanting to reach the sign of true glory, as if by confession of all peoples he would have reached it later, if the adverse fate of the kingdom in the flowering of the years had not taken it away from him.

— Camillo Porzio, La congiura dei baroni.

In fact, Cariteo says of him: "Of the intrepid cor similar to the father, of humanity to the mother".

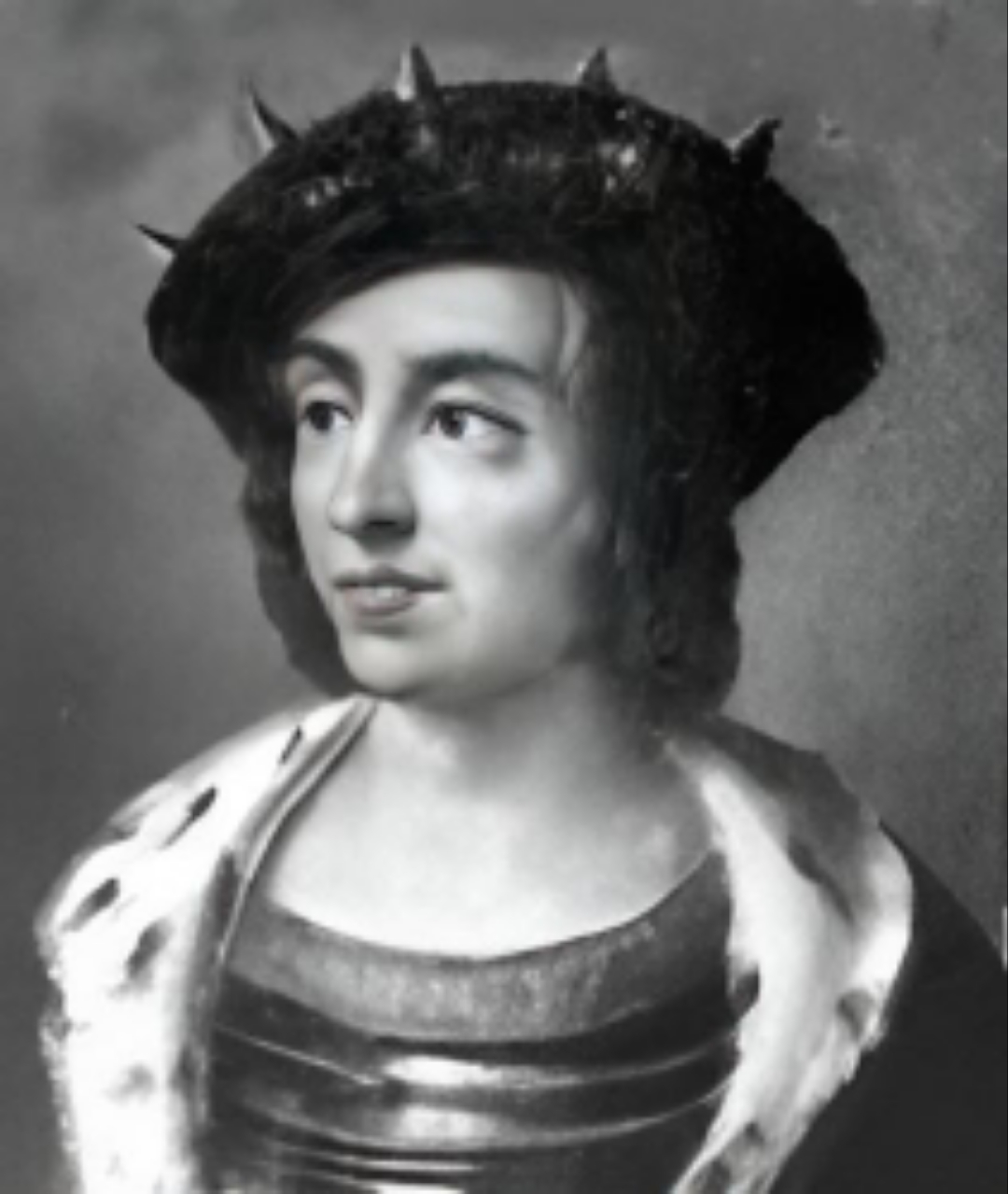
Alleged portrait of King Ferrandino. For the obvious similarities with the sixteenth-century engraving, it is in all probability on this portrait that Aliprando Caprioli relied to make it.

Physically he was a good-looking young man, aitante in the person, with bright eyes, head high, wide chest, dry and muscular. Precisely with regard to this curious tendency to keep one's head held high, Castiglione reports that "what custom King Ferrandino had contracted from infirmity", while not specifying which disease it was. He also reports that knowing that he was "very handsome" of body, "King Ferrando took the opportunity to undress sometimes in a doublet".

Ferrandino was also cultivated in the literary arts, having as teachers Gabriele Altilio and Aulo Giano Parrasio, and in fact he delighted in composing poems in his spare time. One wrote, for example, to his own subject, who was amazed at his departure from Naples, probably in the dramatic days of the French invasion:

Who is content with my departure,

who rejoices, and laughs at who they like,
who complains and who complains,
who is afflicted by it and who despairs.
Who pulls me in this trouble and who pushes me away,
who is sorry and who is sorry.
My wretched soul that torments itself

in this fire it consumes itself and is silent.

— Ferrandino d'Aragona, strambotto.

=== Sexuality ===
Unlike his father and grandfather, Ferrandino did not usually keep fixed lovers with him, and in fact the existence of his illegitimate children is not known; however, like his grandfather and father he had very free sexual customs. As proof of his physical prowess as well as the favor he enjoyed among women, an episode is known to have occurred during September 1494, while Ferrandino, then Duke of Calabria, was encamped at the city of Cesena.

The event is reported in a letter dated 4 October by Bernardo Dovizi from Bibbiena to Piero il Fatuo. Ferrandino was approached one evening by a "good man" named Mattio, who made him understand that he had to talk about a matter of enormous importance. Received by the duke the next day, Mattio reported to him that there was a "noble and beautiful woman [...] for nobility and beauty, the first girl in all of Romagna" who having admired four years ago a portrait of Ferrandino and having heard praise for his countless virtues, had fallen madly in love with him and with her own risk had come to Cesena only to be able to see him; moreover, having seen him, she had become so inflamed of him that "she finds no rest or place or thing that brings any relief to so much its fire". Mattio therefore prayed that he would deign to "have compassion on those who die for you", and that he wanted to satisfy her in his desire, because otherwise "the life of the miserable would soon be missing". Ferrandino initially remained in doubt, suspecting it could be a plot against him and that the woman wanted to poison him during coitus, especially since he came from enemy territory, and therefore made her wait a few more days and meanwhile inquired about her identity, before being convinced that it was foolish on his part to suspect this danger and consenting to the meeting. Therefore, pretending to go out hunting, he went in great secrecy to a country house where the woman was waiting for him and where "he consumed the holy marriage with great sweetness of one side and the other".

This woman, indicated in the letter with the name of Caterina Gonzaga, was perhaps a Gonzaga of the Novellara branch and perhaps daughter of that Giorgio Gonzaga who died in 1487, and therefore sister of that Taddea who married Matteo Maria Boiardo. Dovizi, who is very skeptical about the sincerity of the love professed by the woman, does not fail to write his impressions in this regard to Piero il Fatuo, judging that Caterina must perhaps have heard of the considerable size of Ferrandino's manly member, whom he describes in enthusiastic terms as "very honorable", and that therefore more than by love he was driven by lust.

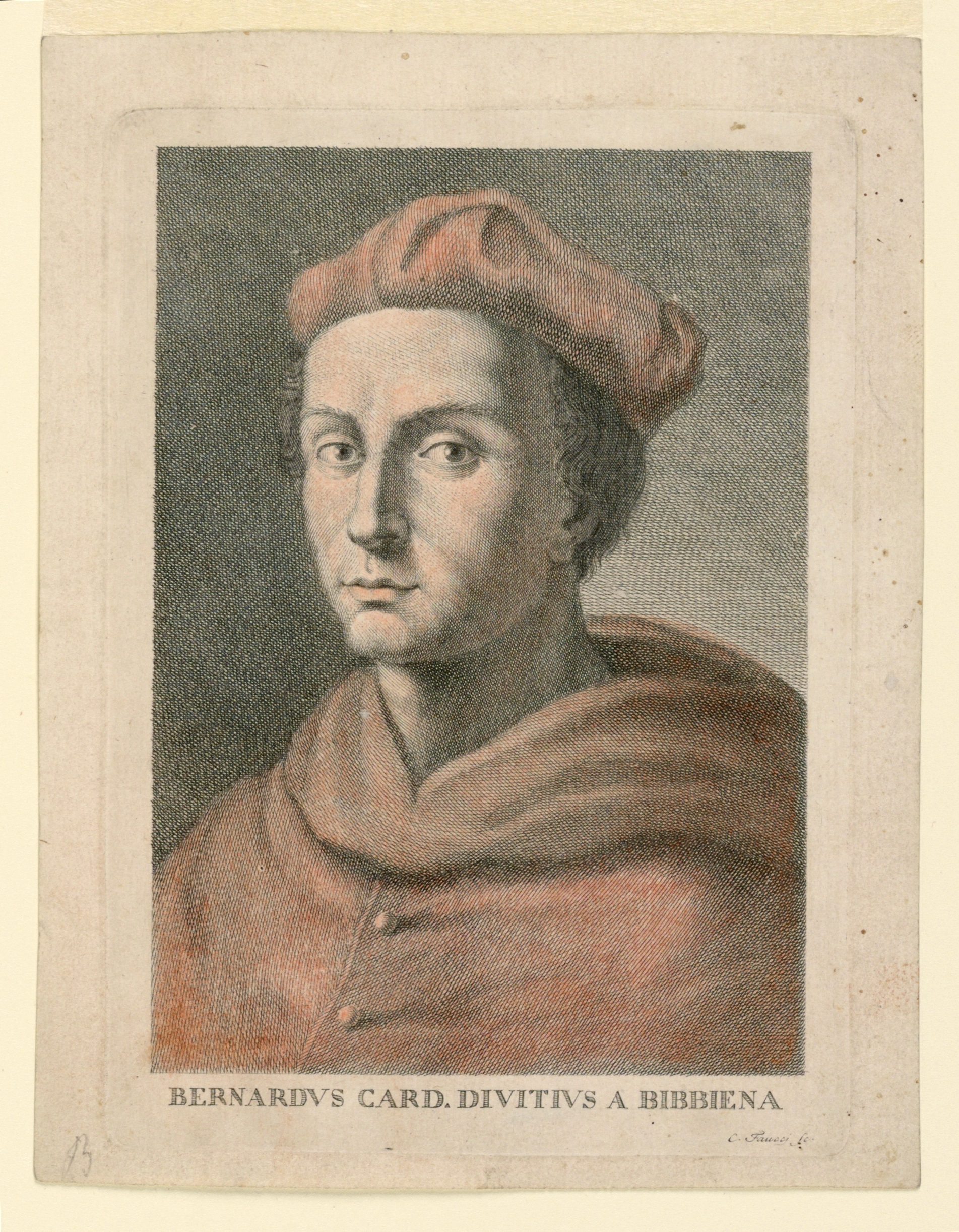
Cardinal Bernardo Dovizi da Bibbiena in a print of the eighteenth century. Carlo Faucci.

Although Ferrandino did not then "for his conscience" reveal to anyone the relationship if not to a few people, including precisely the Dovizi (with whom he used to speak "freely of everything") and the Marquis of Pescara Alfonso II d'Avalos, the fame of the great beauty of this Caterina came to the ears of Ludovico il Moro, who at that time was in Asti in the company of the King of France and was always eager to have beautiful women around him. Ludovico then sent for the woman, inviting her to go to Asti to please the king and offering her in return the sum of over 3,500 ducats that could be used to pay for the trip. Caterina, however, outraged by the proposal, prayed to Ferrandino that he would help her to invent a good excuse to decline the offer, because "she neither wants nor can leave". He then decided, to the laughter of his friends, that Caterina promised Ludovico il Moro to go and accept the offer in money, but that he instead stole the duchies from the man who would bring them to him and stay with him in Cesena.

Nevertheless, Ferrandino, since he had been told that Piero il Fatuo had tried to obtain the woman without succeeding, showed himself very willing to lend it to him, saying: "I want these women's things, like the others, to be common among us". Dovizi replied by saying that the exchange offer to Piero would certainly not be agreed to, as Piero had lovers with him while Ferrandino did not. He also judged that his availability was due to the fact that in truth he did not like Caterina's "meat", something that Ferrandino assured him not to be true, claiming "that he likes everything about her" and that indeed before leaving "he wants another feast".

A subsequent letter from Dovizi, dated 9 October, describes Piero il Fatuo then sending certain letters to the camp with a portrait of Caterina herself, demonstrating that the woman had already been his lover. Dovizi reports that Ferrandino, after reading the letter with him, "laughed so much and so heartily that I could not say any more, and I swear to you that I have not seen him nor do I think I can ever see him in such joy as he was then", and he wanted it to be re-read several times even in the presence of d'Avalos. Ferrandino then confessed that he had lied in saying that he liked the woman, believing that neither Piero nor Dovizi knew her, while in truth he had not liked it at all, if not for "a little manners", and that he was "more out of boredom than the devil". He also adds that if Caterina still wants him, then she will have to come herself to the military camp to find him, "otherwise she can scratch it so much that she coves the desire by herself", since he "will not move a step", and that "if she does not come to the camp, she can be hanged for him, who no longer plans to see him again, and if he came to the camp he would prove how heavy the Marquis weighs", or if he showed up in the military camp Ferrandino would offer it as much to his friend Alfonso d'Avalos. Dovizi concludes the matter by saying that Ferrandino also offered him to try the woman, but that he would never have allowed himself to lie with a woman with whom he had already lay his lord Piero, in fact "where the master has gone he would beware as much as the fire and the devil himself go there".

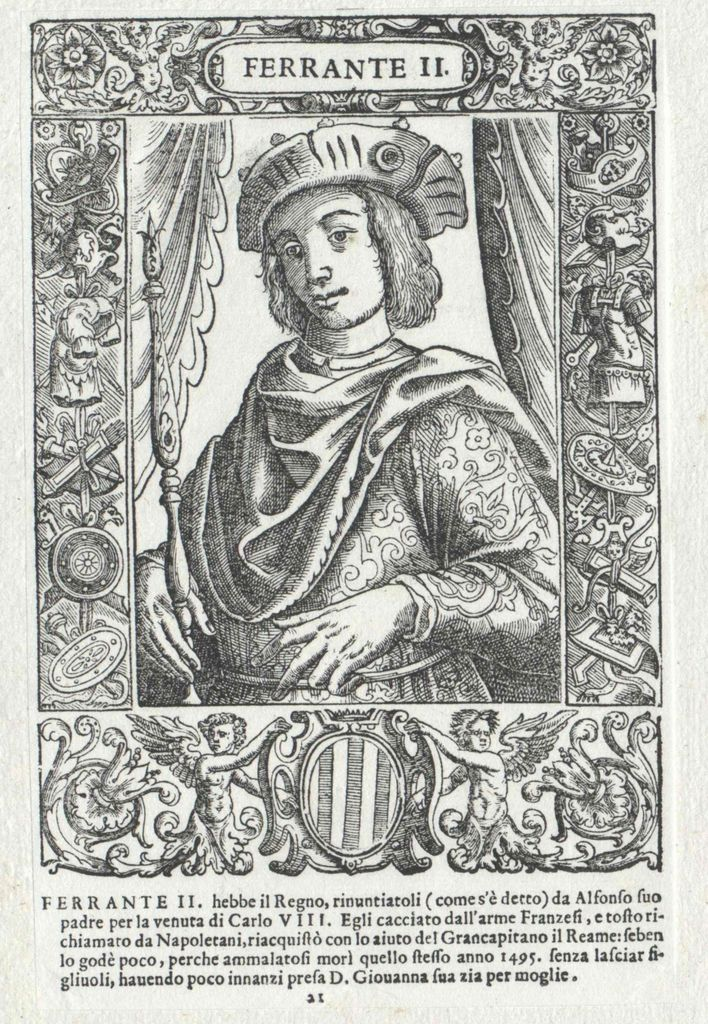
Posthumous engraving of Ferrandino, c. 1600–1700.

The letters of Dovizi of this period, overly stuffed with obscenity and double meanings, since the nineteenth century have been abundantly censored in all the works and essays that deal with the subject, though they are still preserved at the Medici state archive in Florence and digitally usable.

Certainly Ferrandino was aware of his physical qualities and did not exploit them only for his own personal gain, but also for those political-diplomatic issues that could benefit the state: in fact, he always writes the usual Dovizi, who in presenting himself in Forlì to Countess Caterina Sforza, of whom he sought the alliance in the war against the French, Ferrandino "went tight and beautifully dressed in the Neapolitan style". In fact, he knew that the countess had a real passion for good-looking men and probably hoped to win their friendship. The attempt, perhaps, had a certain success, as Dovizi, in especially enigmatic language, goes on to say that although Ferrandino was not physically liked by the countess very much, nevertheless "they shook hands scratching and at the same time noticed a lot of sparkling eyes"; also the castellan Giacomo Feo, then a young lover of the same countess, showed himself quite jealous, and in fact Ferrandino and Caterina "they stayed about two hours together but under the eyes of all, since the Feo wants she for himself".

== In popular culture ==
- The character Ferdinand in William Shakespeare's play The Tempest is possibly based on the historical figure of Ferdinand II of Naples (see Michele Stanco, Il caos ordinato, Rome, Carocci, 2009).
- In the 2011–2013 Canadian television series The Borgias, Ferdinand II is theoretically portrayed by the Swedish actor Matias Varela, though the character shown in the series has nothing in common with the historical figure of Ferdinand other than the name.

== See also ==
- Italian Wars
- History of Naples
- List of monarchs of Naples

== Sources ==
- Mallett, Michael Edward (2012). The Italian Wars, 1494-1559 : War, State and Society in Early Modern Europe. Harlow, England: Pearson. ISBN 978-0-582-05758-6.
- Musto, Ronald G. (2019). Writing Southern Italy Before the Renaissance: Trecento Historians of the Mezzogiorno. Routledge.
- Williams, George L. (1998). Papal Genealogy: The Families and Descendants of the Popes. McFarland & Company, Inc.
- Corio, Bernardino (1565). L'Historia di Milano. presso Giorgio de' Caualli – via Giorgio de' Cavalli.
- Dina, Achille (1921). Isabella d'Aragona Duchessa di Milano e di Bari.

Ferdinand II of Naples House of Trastamara Born: 26 August 1469 Died: 7 September 1496
Regnal titles
Preceded by Alfons II	King of Naples; 1495–1496	Succeeded by Frederick
