= Fortitude =

Fortitude may refer to:

- Courage, the choice and willingness to confront danger

== Ships ==
- HMS Fortitude, any one of several Royal Navy ships and installations
  - HMS Fortitude (1780), a 74-gun third rate launched in 1780
  - HMS Cumberland (1807) was launched as a 74-gun third rate; in 1833 she became the prison hulk HMS Fortitude
- Fortitude (ship), a sailing ship that carried free immigrants to Australia in 1849
- ST Fortitude, an Admiralty tugboat in service from 1947 to 1962
- USS Fortitude (AMc-81), a 1941 United States Accentor-class minesweeper
- Fortitude (1780 EIC ship), a merchant vessel built in 1780 on the River Thames

== Places ==
- Fortitude Valley, Queensland, a section of Brisbane
  - Fortitude Valley railway station, located beneath the Valley Metro complex
  - Electoral district of Fortitude Valley, a Legislative Assembly electorate in the state of Queensland

== Arts and entertainment ==
- Fortitude (Botticelli), a 1470 painting
- Fortitude (play), a 1968 short work by Kurt Vonnegut
- Fortitude (TV series), a 2015 British drama television series
- Fortitude (King), a public artwork by American artist James King
- Patience and Fortitude, the lion sculptures flanking the entrance to the Schwarzman branch of the New York Public Library
- Fortitude (2020 film), a drama film
- Fortitude (2026 film), a historical spy action-adventure film
- Fortitude (album), a 2021 album by Gojira
- Fortitude, a 2012 album by Ian Cooke
- Fortitude: American Resilience in the Era of Outrage, a 2020 non-fiction book by Dan Crenshaw
- Fortitude, a 1913 novel by Hugh Walpole

== Other uses ==
- Operation Fortitude, a World War II deception operation
- United Patriots Front, or Fortitude, an Australian populist far-right street protest movement and Facebook group

== See also ==
- Fortitudo (disambiguation)
