= Castel Nuovo =

Medieval castle in Naples, Italy

Castel Nuovo Maschio Angioino
- Naples, Campania, Italy
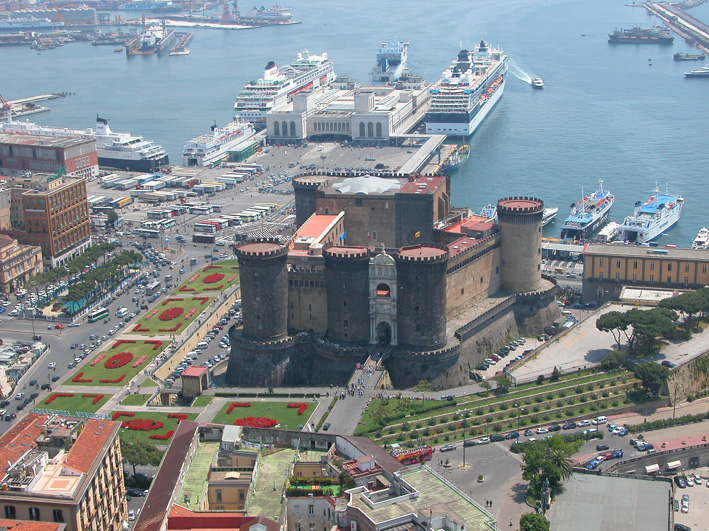
- The castle seen from the north west in 2011

Site information
- Owner: Municipality of Naples
- Controlled by: Municipal Department of Cultural Heritage of Naples
- Open to the public: Yes
- Condition: Good

Location
- Location within Italy
- Coordinates: 40.838408°N 14.253307°E

Site history
- Built: 1282; Rebuilt in 1479
- Built by: Pierre de Chaulnes; Most of it rebuilt by Guillem Sagrera
- In use: Still in use today
- Materials: Sandstone

Castel Nuovo (Italian: [kasˌtɛl ˈnwɔːvo]; Neapolitan: Castiello Nuovo; 'New Castle'), often called Maschio Angioino (Italian: [ˈmaskjo andʒoˈiːno]; Neapolitan: Maschio Angiuino; ' Angevin Keep'), is a medieval castle located in front of Piazza Municipio and the city hall (Palazzo San Giacomo) in central Naples, Campania, Italy. Its scenic location and imposing size makes the castle, first erected in 1279, one of the main architectural landmarks of the city. It was a royal seat for kings of Naples, Aragon and Spain until 1815.

It is the headquarters of Società Napoletana di Storia Patria ("Neapolitan Society of Homeland History") and of the Naples Committee of the Istituto per la storia del Risorgimento italiano (Institute for the History of the Italian Risorgimento). In the complex there is also the civic museum, which includes the Palatine Chapel and the museum paths on the first and second floors.

== History ==
=== The origins and the House of Anjou ===
The original nucleus of the estate—partially uncovered through restoration and archaeological excavations—was built on the initiative of Charles I of Anjou. In 1266, after defeating the Hohenstaufens, Charles ascended to the throne of Sicily and moved the capital from Palermo to Naples.

The presence of an external monarchy had set the town planning of Naples around the center of the royal power, constituting an alternative urban core, formed by the port and by the two main castles adjacent to it, Castel Capuano and Castel dell'Ovo. This relationship between the royal court and town planning had already manifested itself with Frederick II, Holy Roman Emperor, who in the 13th century, in the Swabian statute had concentrated greater attention on castles neglecting the city walls. To the two existing castles the Anjevins added the main, Castel Nuovo (Chastiau neuf), which was not just a fortification but above all his magnificent palace.

The royal residence of Naples had been until then the Castel Capuano, but the Norman ancient fortress was judged as inadequate to the function and the king wanted to build a new castle near the sea.

The project was designed by the French architect Pierre de Chaulnes, the construction of the Castrum Novum started in 1279 to finish just three years later, a very short time considering the techniques of construction of the period and the overall size of the work. However, the king never lived there: following the War of the Sicilian Vespers, which cost to the House of Anjou the crown of Sicily, conquered by Peter III of Aragon and other events, the new palace remained unused until 1285, the year of the death of Charles I.

=== Kingdom of Naples rule of the Angevin dynasty ===
The new king Charles II of Naples moved with his family and the court to the new residence, which he enlarged and embellished. During his reign the Holy See was particularly linked to the House of Anjou, in a turbulent relationship, which also in the following years will be marked by pressure, alliances and continuous ruptures. On December 13 of 1294 the Main Hall of the Castel Nuovo was the scene of the famous abdication of Pope Celestine V (the hermit Pietro da Morrone), from the papal throne, called by Dante Alighieri the great refusal and the following December 24, in the same hall the board of cardinals elected Benedetto Caetani, who assumed the name of Pope Boniface VIII and immediately moved its headquarters to Rome to avoid the interference of the Anjevin family.

With the ascent to the throne of Robert, King of Naples, in 1309, the castle, which he renovated and expanded, became a remarkable center of culture, because to his patronage and his passion for the arts and literature: the Castel Nuovo hosted important personalities of the culture of the time, such as the writers Petrarch and Giovanni Boccaccio in their Neapolitan stays, while the most famous painters of the time that they were called to paint its walls: Pietro Cavallini, Montano d'Arezzo, and above all Giotto, who in 1332 painted the Palatine Chapel.

From 1343 it was the residence of Joanna I of Naples, who in 1347, fled to France, abandoned it to the assaults of the army of the King Louis I of Hungary. He had come to avenge the death of his brother Andrew, the Giovanna's husband, killed by a palace plot that the queen herself was suspected of instigating it. The castle was looted and on its return the queen was forced to a radical restructuring. During the second expedition of Louis against Naples the castle, where the queen had found refuge, resisted the assaults. In the following years the fortress underwent other attacks: on the occasion of the taking of Naples by Charles III of Naples and then that of Louis II of Naples, who subtracted it from the son of Charles III, Ladislaus of Naples. The latter, regained the throne in 1399, lived there until his death in 1414.

Joanna II of Naples succeeded her brother Ladislaus and ascended the throne as the last Anjevin dynasty. The queen would have hosted in her alcove lovers of all kinds and social background, even rounded up by her emissaries among young people she found to be handsome. To protect her good name, Joanna II would not hesitate to get rid of them as soon as she satisfied her cravings. Precisely for this purpose it has been narrated for centuries that the queen had a secret trapdoor inside the castle: her lovers, having exhausted their task, were thrown into this well and were devoured by sea monsters. According to a legend, it would have been a crocodile from Africa to the castle's dungeons after crossing the Mediterranean Sea, the perpetrator of the horrendous death of the Joanna's lovers.

=== Aragonese rule ===
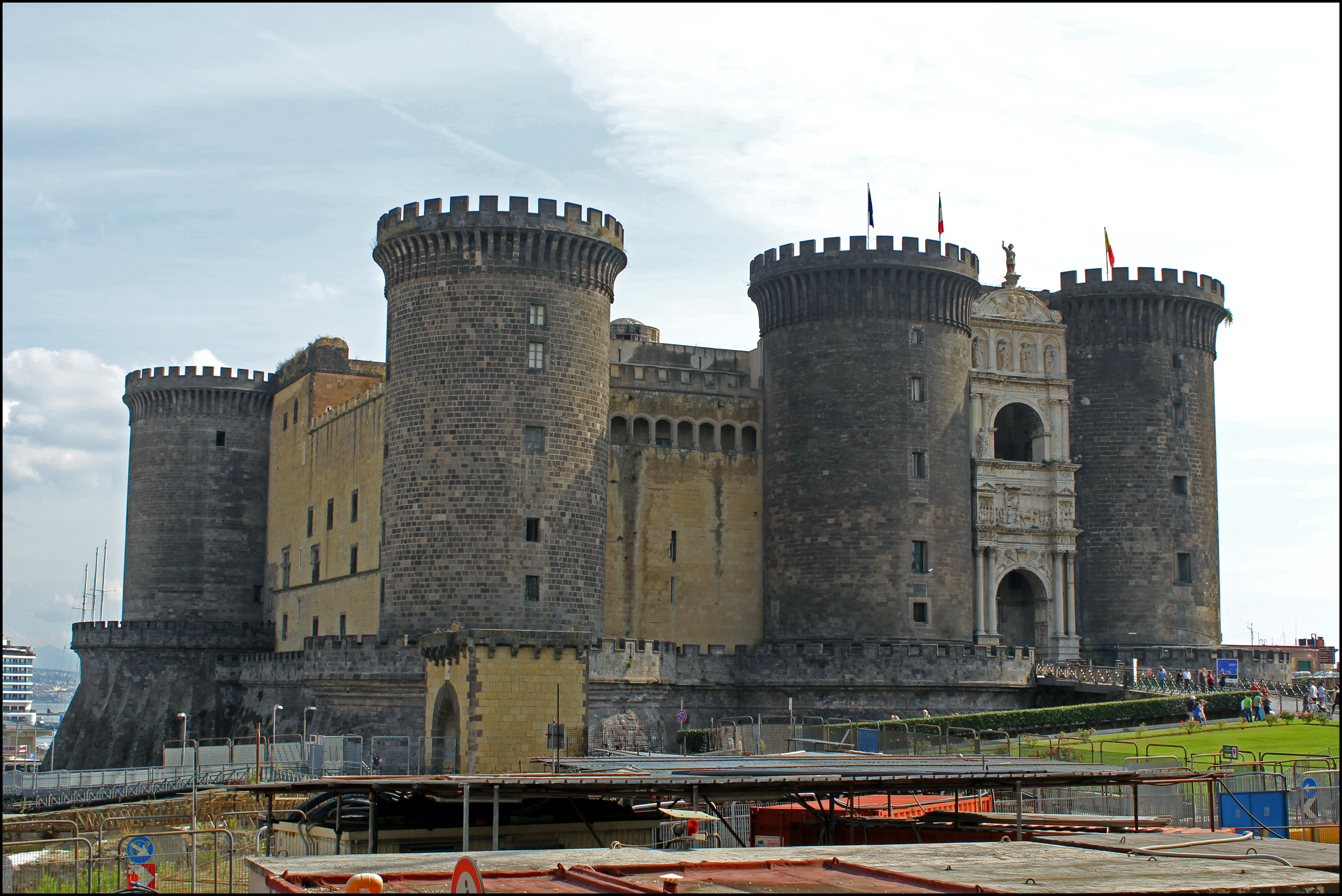
Castel Nuovo seen from the northwest in 2014. The main entrance is through a triumphal arch between two tall round towers.

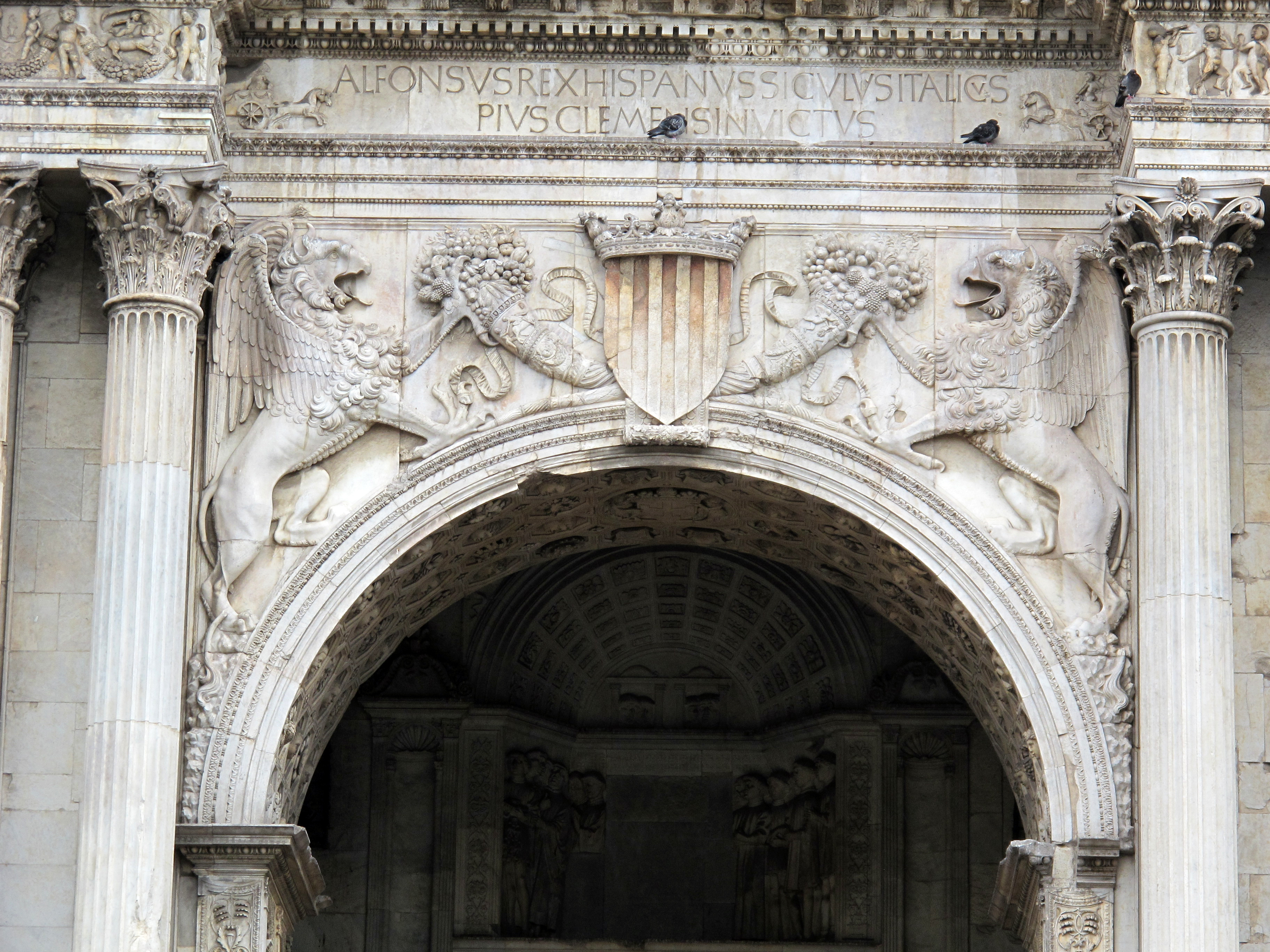
Detail of the triumphal arch

In 1443 Alfonso V of Aragon, who had conquered the throne of Naples, established a court in the castle, such as to compete with the Florentine court of Lorenzo de' Medici and the fortress was completely rebuilt in its present form, maintaining its function as the center of royal power.

King Alfonso V entrusted the restructuring of the Angevin fortress-palace to the Mallorca-born Catalan architect Guillem Sagrera, who rebuilt it in Catalan Gothic style. The five round towers, four of which incorporated the previous Anjevin construction with a square plan, suitable to support the blows of the guns of the time, reiterated the defensive role of the castle. The importance of the palace as a center of royal power was instead emphasized by rebuilding the Main Gate in a Triumphal Arc shape, a masterpiece of the Neapolitan Renaissance architecture and work of Dalmatian Francesco Laurana, together with many artists of various origins. The works took place starting from 1453 and only after the king's death was completed in 1479.

=== Ferdinand I of Naples rule ===
In the Hall of the Barons there was the epilogue of the famous Conspiracy of the Barons, war against the King Ferdinand I of Naples, son of Alfonso V, by many nobles, led by Antonello Sanseverino, Prince of Salerno, and Francesco Coppola, Count of Sarno. In 1486 the king invited all the conspirators to this room under the pretext of a wedding party, which marked the overcoming of hostilities and definitive reconciliation. The barons ran, but the king, ordered his soldiers to bar the doors, had them arrested, punishing many of them, including Coppola and his sons, with the death sentence.

==== Conspiracy of the Barons ====
The Conspiracy of the Barons was a movement of reaction against the policies of centralization of the State adopted by the new sovereign dynasty of Naples, i.e. the Aragonese. The lawsuits against Ferdinand I of Naples were that these began the recovery of populated areas, taking them away from the Barons' property and supplying them with that of the Aragonese court. In fact, the maneuver was a royal delivery of power.

The internal struggle between barons and dynasty took place in a political and hidden manner and the same culminated definitively in 1487 in the homonymous hall of the Castel Nuovo. Ferdinand I of Naples, during his throne, he found himself facing the barons, beating them in skill and cunning after plots, assassins and double games.

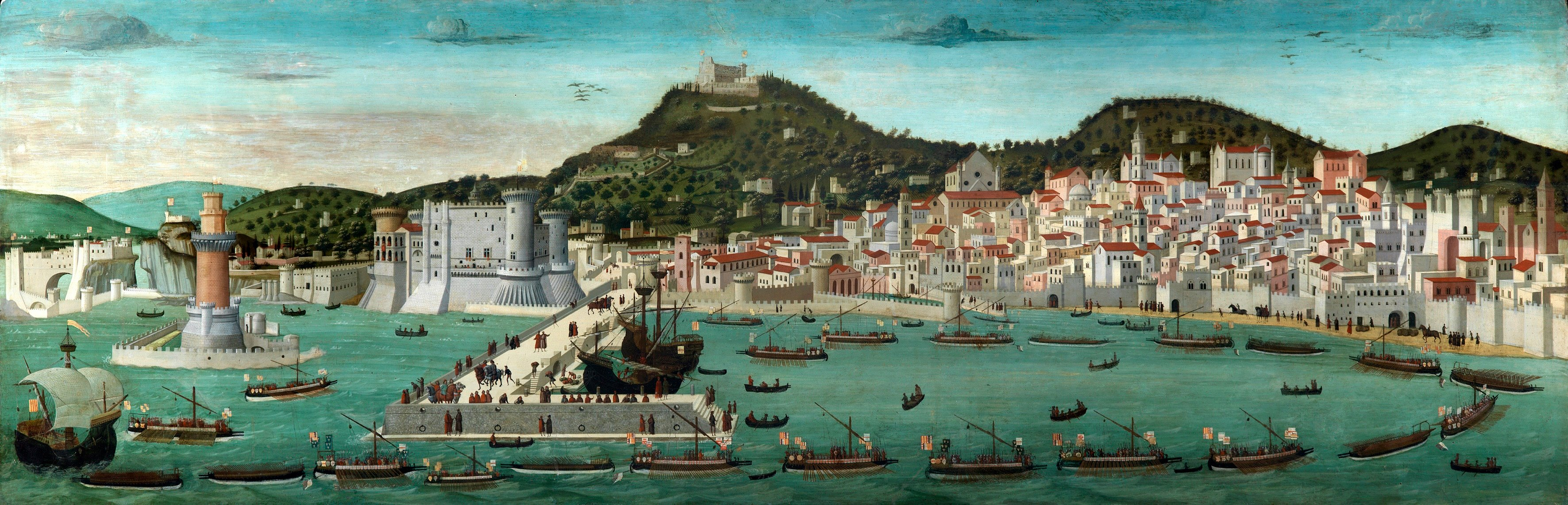
View of Naples in 1472 by Tavola Strozzi, with Castel Nuovo in center left

=== Spanish rule ===
The castle was again looted by Charles VIII of France, during his expedition in 1494. First with the fall of Ferdinand II of Naples (1496) and later of Frederick of Naples (1503), the kingdom of Naples was annexed to the Kingdom of Spain by Ferdinand II of Aragon, who established the Viceroyalty of Naples. The Castel Nuovo lost its function as a royal residence, becoming a military garrison, due to its strategically important position. However, it hosted the Kings of Spain who came to visit Naples, like Charles V, Holy Roman Emperor, who lived there for a short time in 1535. The castle remained the residence of the Spanish Viceroy until the early 17th century when the new palace (now the Royal Palace of Naples) replaced it.

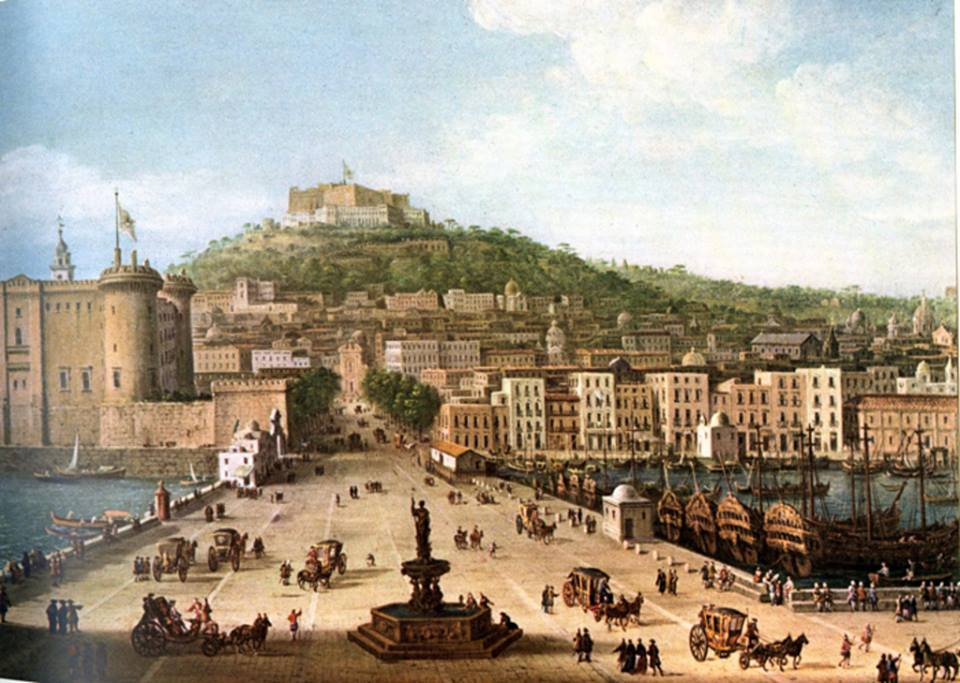
View of Naples from the harbor pier in 1777 by Antonio Joli. Castel Sant'Elmo is visible on the hill in the background.

The castle was again arranged by Prince Charles of Bourbon, the future Charles III of Spain, ascended to the throne of Naples in 1734, but lost its role of a royal residence, in favor to the new royal palaces that went building in Naples itself and its surroundings (the Royal Palace of Naples at the Piazza del Plebiscito, Palace of Capodimonte, Palace of Portici and Royal Palace of Caserta) and became essentially a symbol of the history and greatness of Naples.

=== Neapolitan Republic ===
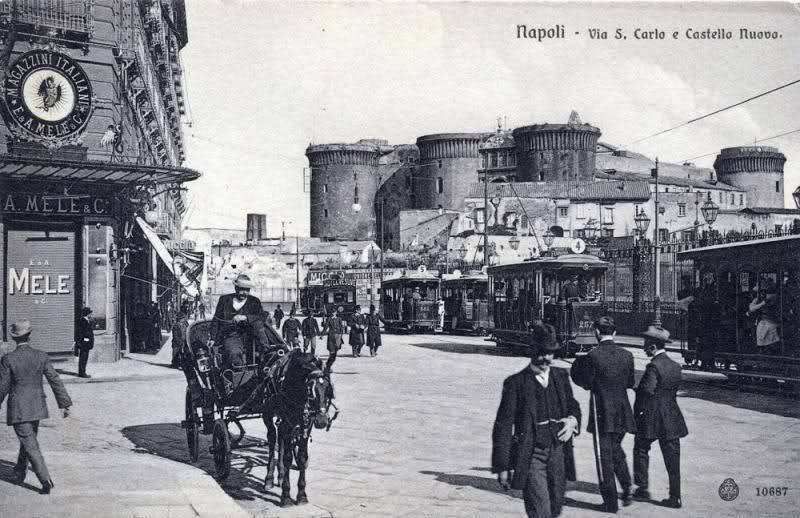
Castel Nuovo in the late-19th century

The last important event dates back to 1799, when it was proclaimed the birth of the Parthenopean Republic (Neapolitan Republic). Renovated for the last time in 1823 by Ferdinand I of the Two Sicilies, it later hosted the "artillery arsenal" and a "pyrotechnic office" which in 1837 estimated to be more prudent transfer of the guns factory of the Torre Annunziata.

=== 20th century ===
In the 1920s was made the wide range of flower gardens that ran along the Maschio Angioino until the end-20th century: in the early months of 1921 Count Pietro Municchi, an engineer then councilor of urban decor, presented to the City Council the proposal for the isolation of the Castel Nuovo.

Finally the Italian State obtained the entire castle for civil purposes, the works began in 1923 and also affected the factories and warehouses built near the square in place of the demolished bastions: already the following year all the various buildings were eliminated and the esplanade was created where gardens were built on the side of current Vittorio Emanuele III street.

Only the door of the citadel was saved, the original Aragonese access to the complex, rebuilt in 1496 by Frederick of Naples (as evidenced by its emblem on the arch): isolated and distorted of its function, is visible among the flower garden square along Via Vittorio Emanuele III. The work related to the restoration of the castle, which eliminated the many superficies added over time, lasted until 1939.

== People who have lived in the castle ==
The Castel Nuovo, in the course of its history, has been used several times as a temporary residence to host illustrious personalities who went to Naples as guests of the royal court or on an official visit.

Among the main personalities, beside Neapolitean, Aragonese and Spanish monarchs, are: Giovanni Boccaccio, Giotto, Pope Boniface VIII, Pope Celestine V and Petrarch.

== Description ==
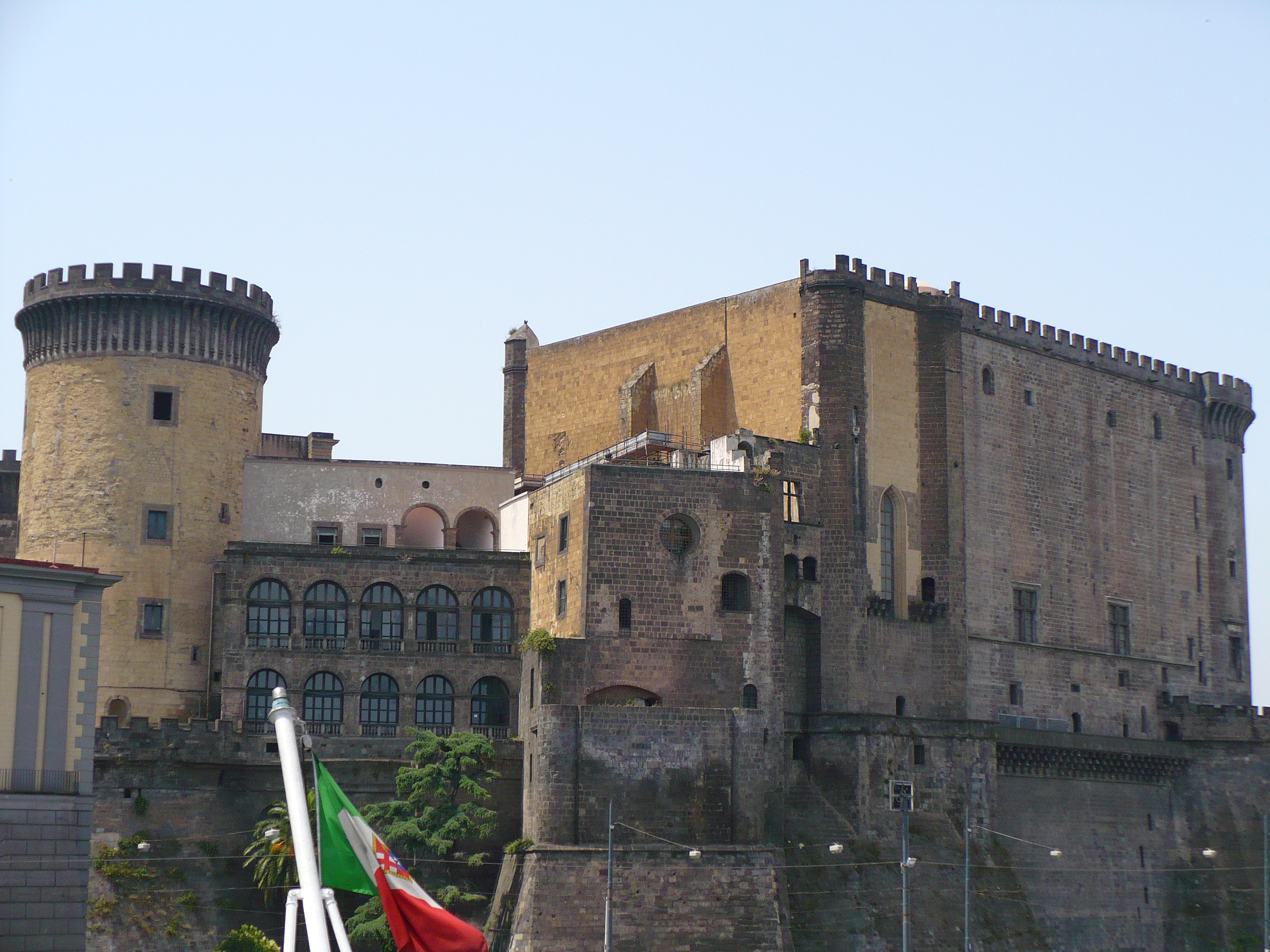
Castel Nuovo seen from the port. The Tower dell'Oro is visible on the left.

Most of the castle as it stands today has been reconstructed by Alfonso V of Aragon. It has an irregularly trapezoidal plan and was defended by five large cylindrical towers, four covered with piperno and one with tuff, and crowned with merlons on brackets. The three towers on the land-facing side, where the entrance is located, are (from left to right) the Tower of San Giorgio, the Torre di Mezzo (the 'Middle Tower', which collapsed on 4 August 1876) and the Torre della Guardia (the 'Guard Tower'), while the two on the sea-facing side are (from left to right) the Torre dell'Oro ('Tower of Gold') and the Torre di Beverello ('Tower of Beverello', named after the port). The castle is surrounded by a moat and the towers rise on large embankments, in which the texture of the stone blocks takes on complex designs, recalling Catalan Mallorcan examples.

The internal staircase to each of the towers is commonly called scala catalan, 'Catalan staircase'. They lead through doors to the roof of the castle, where sentries were once stationed to keep a lookout from above for any approaching enemy.

On the northern side, at the Beverello Tower, one of the Crusader windows of the Sala dei Baroni ('Baron's Hall') opens; while two other windows face the eastern side, one towards the sea and the other, along the back wall of the Palatine Chapel, with single-light windows between two narrow polygonal towers. Protected by the other corner tower, Torre d'Oro, then follows an advanced factory building that originally supported a loggia and a re-entering stretch with two overlapping loggias.

=== Triumphal arch ===
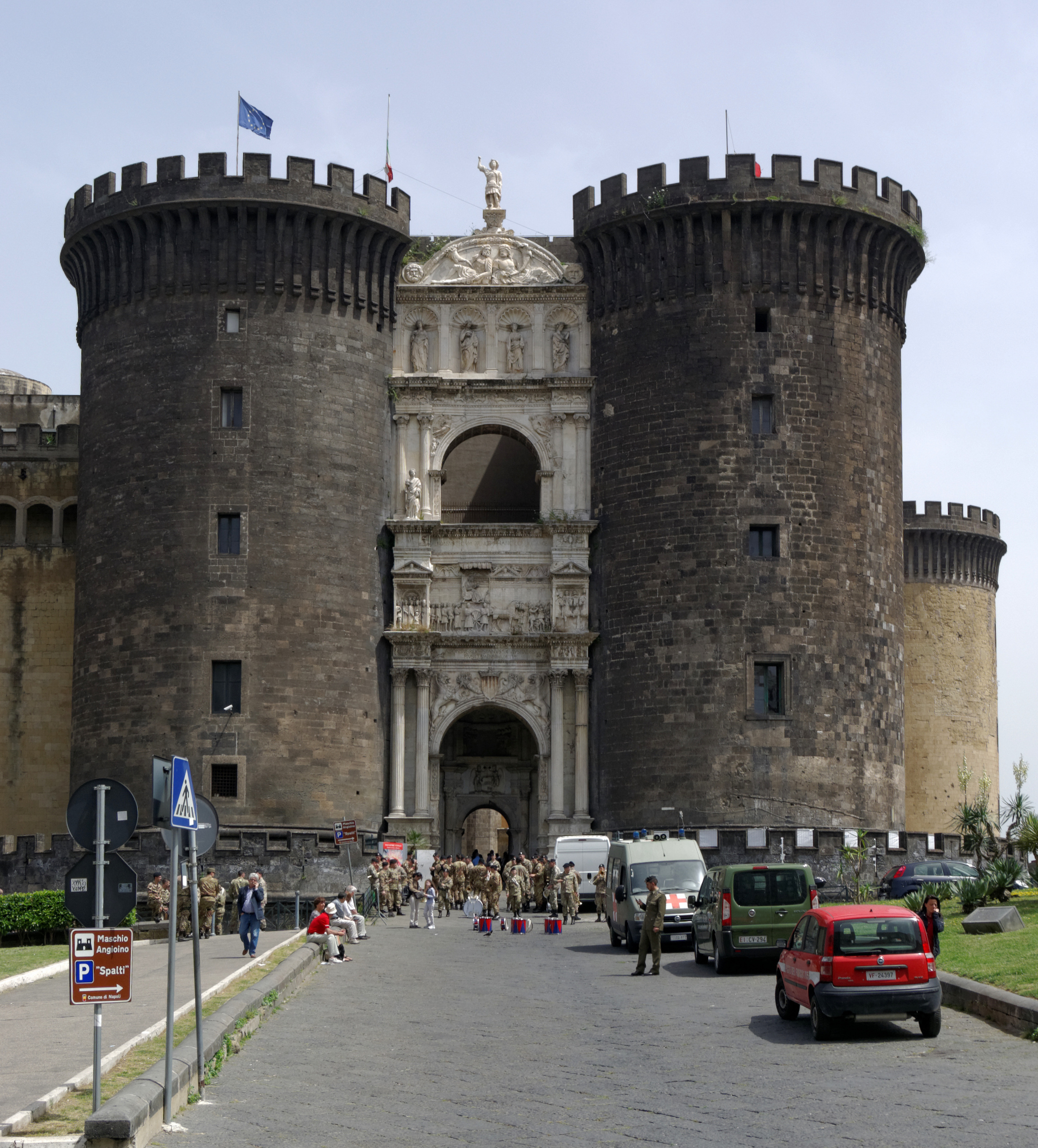
The triumphal arch integrated into the gatehouse

The imposing single-sided white marble triumphal arch, built in 1470, commemorates Alfonso of Aragon's entry to Naples in 1443. It stands between two western towers of the Angevin castle. The overall design had been attributed to Pietro di Martina, a Milanese architect, or, according to Vasari, to Giuliano da Maiano. Modern authors attribute the design to Francesco Laurana.

It is 35 meters tall and has been elongated into two stacked arches. Some reports claim that the arches had originally been planned as the two faces to a frestanding arch for the Piazza del Duomo, but that an officer in the service of Alfonso, Nicola Bozzuto, whose house was to be razed to make room for the monument, induced the king to alter the site to the Castel Nuovo.

Corinthian columns flank the entrance, while the first level sculpture depicts a triumphal quadriga leading Alfonso parading. The sculptors included Isaia da Pisa, Giovanni da Nola (Merliano), Domenico Gagini, Andrea Fiorentino, a pupil of Donatello, and Silvestro dell'Aquila. Sculptors from Aragon also contributed to the work. The center has a shield with the symbols of Aragon. The Frieze below reads: ALFONSVS REX HISPANVS SICULVS ITALICUS PIVS CLEMENS INVICTUS Above it reads: ALFONSVS REGUM PRINCEPS HANC CONDIDIT ARCEM

The second arch is perched on top of the first, right above the lower tier's attic frieze depicting the triumphal procession. On the left side of this open arch is a freestanding statue of King Alfonso.

Flanking the upper, curved end of the opening, there are two spandrels decorated in relief with a putto and a winged Victory figure each. These are directly inspired by the design of classical Roman triumphal gateways.

A frieze depicting pairs of lions facing each other caps the opening.

The four niches with statues of the cardinal virtues dominate the register above the lions frieze. The conch-topped niches contain the statues of the impersonated four cardinal virtues, Prudence, Fortitude, Temperance, and Justice, virtues attributed to the king, who is thus presented as a moral ruler.

Above them is a curved pediment, flanked at its base corners by two bearded heads, interpreted in different manners, depending on the school of thought, as either ancient emperors or philosophers (so by George L. Hersey), or as representing wind gods or grotesque mascarons, which as ancient Roman motifs would frame the structural boundary of the sky.

Inside the tympanum of the curved pediment are two recumbent, allegorical river gods depicted as mature bearded men, holding large cornucopias (horns of plenty). Based on ancient Roman art, they symbolise material wealth, peace, and territorial expansion.

The statue of St Michael (the archangel) stands at the pinnacle of the monument. The work comes from the studio of Renaissance sculptor Giovanni da Nola (1478–1559). The archangel crowns the largely Roman-inspired iconography, giving it a Christian turn, while representing the heavenly protector of the castle and the state.

The bronze doors at the arch were executed by the monk Guglielmo of Naples, and represent in various compartments the victories of Ferdinand I over the Duke of Anjou and the rebellious barons.

=== Palatine chapel ===
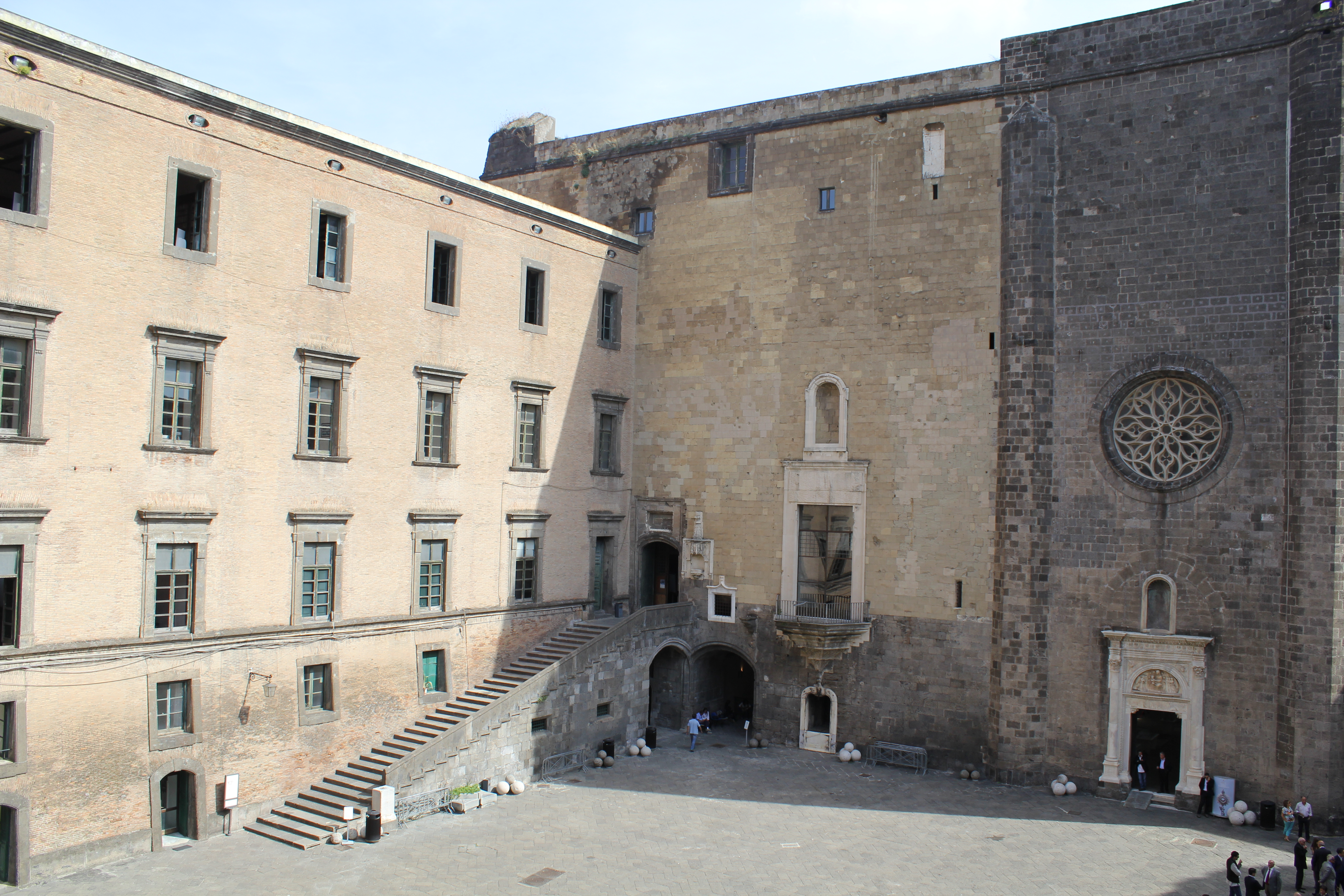
The Palatine chapel

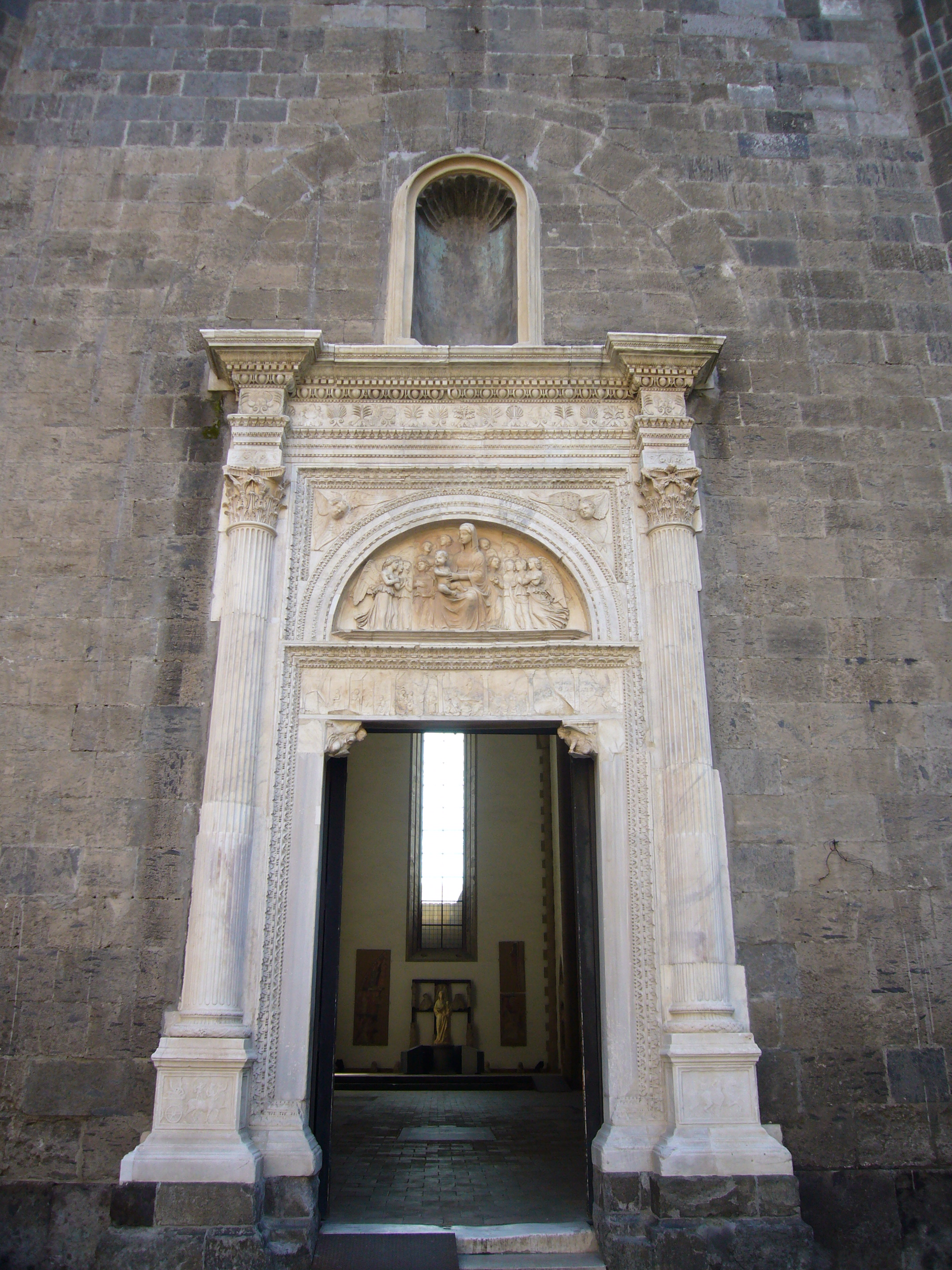
Detail of the entrance portal of Andrea dell'Aquila

On the side of the castle facing the sea is the back wall of the Cappella palatina, or church of San Sebastiano or that of Santa Barbara, the only surviving element of the 14th century Anjevin castle. Although was damaged in the earthquake of 1456, the chapel was later restored. The façade on the inner courtyard has a Renaissance portal with reliefs by Andrea dell'Aquila and by Francesco Laurana and a rose window, rebuilt in the Aragonese period by the Catalan Matteo Forcimanya to replace that of the 14th-century destroyed by an earthquake.

At the end of the chapel, there is a spiral staircase accessible from a door on the left that allowed you to go up to the Hall of the Barons.

Inside, illuminated by tall and narrow Gothic windows, there are only few remains of the original frescoed decoration, the work of Maso di Banco and a ciborium of Iacopo della Pila, dated to the end-15th century. However, there are also other 14th century frescoes from the Castle of Balzo at Casaluce.

The frescoes on the right wall of the chapel were painted by Maso di Banco and contain references to Gothic-Angevin culture. In contrast, those on the left wall are the work of other Florentine artists.

The interior was also frescoed by Giotto towards 1330, which resumed the Stories of the Old and New Testament. The content of this cycle of frescoes is almost entirely lost even if there remains a decorative part in the windows reminiscent of those of the Bardi Chapel of the Basilica of Santa Croce in Florence. Furthermore, it is described, in the verses of an anonymous author in a collection of sonnets of 1350, about the whole work of Giotto concerning the chapel.

Finally, the chapel collects valuable sculptures made by artists who also worked on the triumphal arch of Alfonso II of Aragon (15th century). The same sculptures are excellent examples of Neapolitan Renaissance. One of these is the Tabernacle with the Madonna and Child, a masterpiece by Domenico Gagini, a pupil of Donatello and Brunelleschi.

Moreover, there are two other sculptures of particular importance, both called Madonna enthroned with the Child, and both of Francesco Laurana, sculpted during two different stays in Naples. One of the two was taken to the castle although not part of it, because it was carved for the Chiesa di Sant'Agostino alla Zecca.

=== Hall of the Barons ===
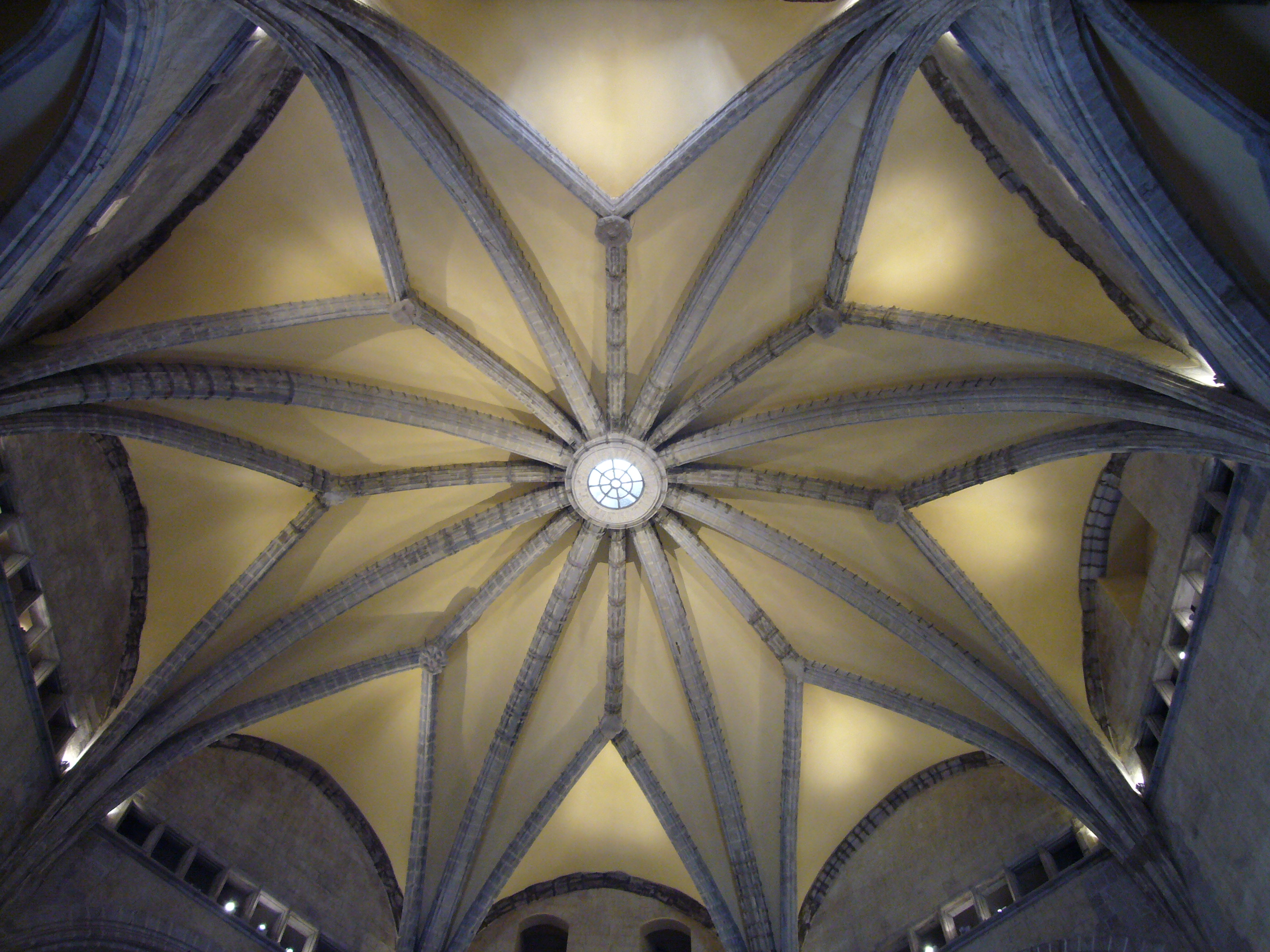
Vault in the Hall of the Barons

(Sala dei Baroni) The Hall of the Barons, originally called the Throne Room, is the main hall (sala Maior) of the Castel Nuovo. It was commissioned by Robert, King of Naples who, for the occasion, called Giotto di Bondone to paint a cycle of frescoes, around 1330. Evidence of this cycle today is known only by its mention in a collection of sonnets by an anonymous author dating back to 1350. The frescoes depicted the illustrious men and women of antiquity: Samson, Hercules, Solomon, Paris, Hector, Achilles, Aeneas, Alexander the Great and Julius Caesar, with their "companions".

Under the Aragonese dominion, more precisely of Alfonso V of Aragon (1442–1458), the hall was rebuilt by Guillem Sagrera who enlarged it the spaces and the dimensions.

The hall is called the Hall of the Barons because around 1487 Ferdinand I of Naples invited some of the barons who had conspired against him to this place, with the excuse of celebrating his nephew's wedding. In reality this was nothing but a trap; the barons that were present were arrested and immediately put to death.

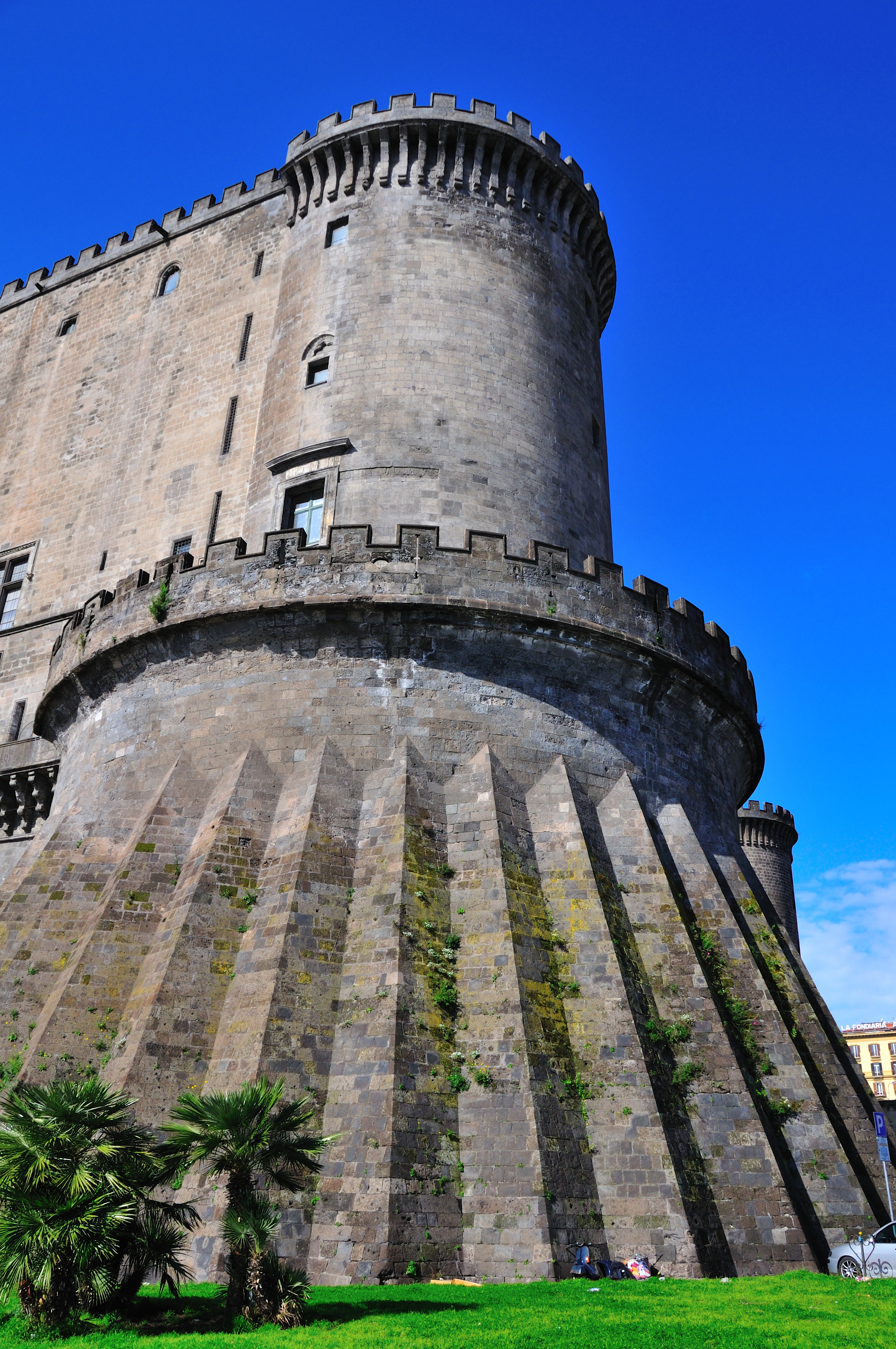
Tower of the Beverello

Located at the corner of the Tower of Beverello, between the northern side and the eastern side, facing the sea, the large room (26 m x 28 m) is covered by an octagonal vault resting on large angular ébrasement and equipped with sixteen ogive forming a star pattern with a bright oculus in the center. Around the dome there are small windows that served soldiers to watch over the person of the king when he received visits or ambassadors. Access to this position of the hall was possible through the helical scale (Catalan staircase) in piperno and in tuff stone, located in the adjacent Tower of Beverello and also built by Guillem Sagrera, during the works that affected the whole royal environment. The floor of the room was decorated with Maiolica white and blue glazed, brought from Valencia.

On the side facing the sea, between two crossed windows open to the outside, there is a large fireplace, surmounted by two stages for musicians.

Among the works of art still present in the hall is the two-faced portal marble of Domenico Gagini, two bas-reliefs on which the triumphal procession of Alfonso V of Aragon is depicted and the entrance of the King in the castle, a Catalan portal through which you access the Chamber of the Angels.

Today part of the sculptural decoration by Barcelonan Pere Johan is dispelled. Until 2006, moreover, it hosted the meetings of the City Council of Naples.

=== Armoury Hall ===
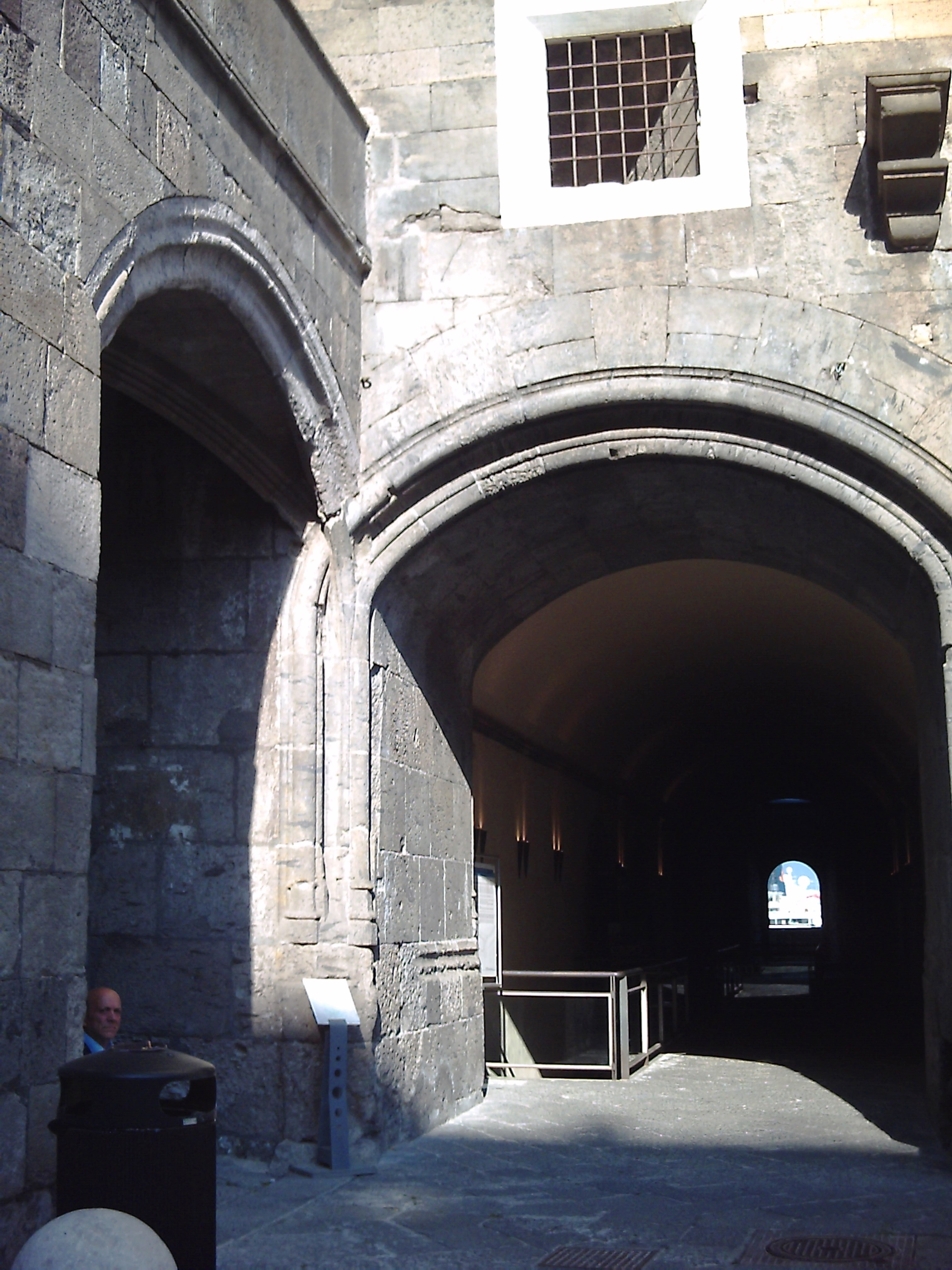
Exterior of the Armoury Hall

This room took its name from the function it served. It is located to the left of the Palatine Chapel, on the lower level with respect to the Hall of the Barons.

During some restoration work on the courtyard of the castle, important archaeological finds of the Roman era of the 1st century BC and of the 5th century were found, The remains are preserved and which can now be viewed via a transparent glass floor.

=== Chapel of the Souls in Purgatory ===
It was built in the second half of the 16th century by the will of the Spanish viceroys who wanted to change the appearance of the castle. It is identifiable with the 14th-century Chapel of San Martino di Tours, once frescoed with the stories of the life of the Saint.

The interior presents a Baroque decoration with frescoes and panel paintings enclosed in stucco frames and gilded wood.

On the high altar, there is a canvas painted by a follower of Girolamo Imparato and Giovann'Angelo D'Amato, depicting the Madonna del Carmine virgin with the purging souls and the Saints Sebastian and Pope Gregory I.

The chapel was mainly used to offer those condemned to death the sacraments before being executed. In the chapel is buried John, the brother of Masaniello.

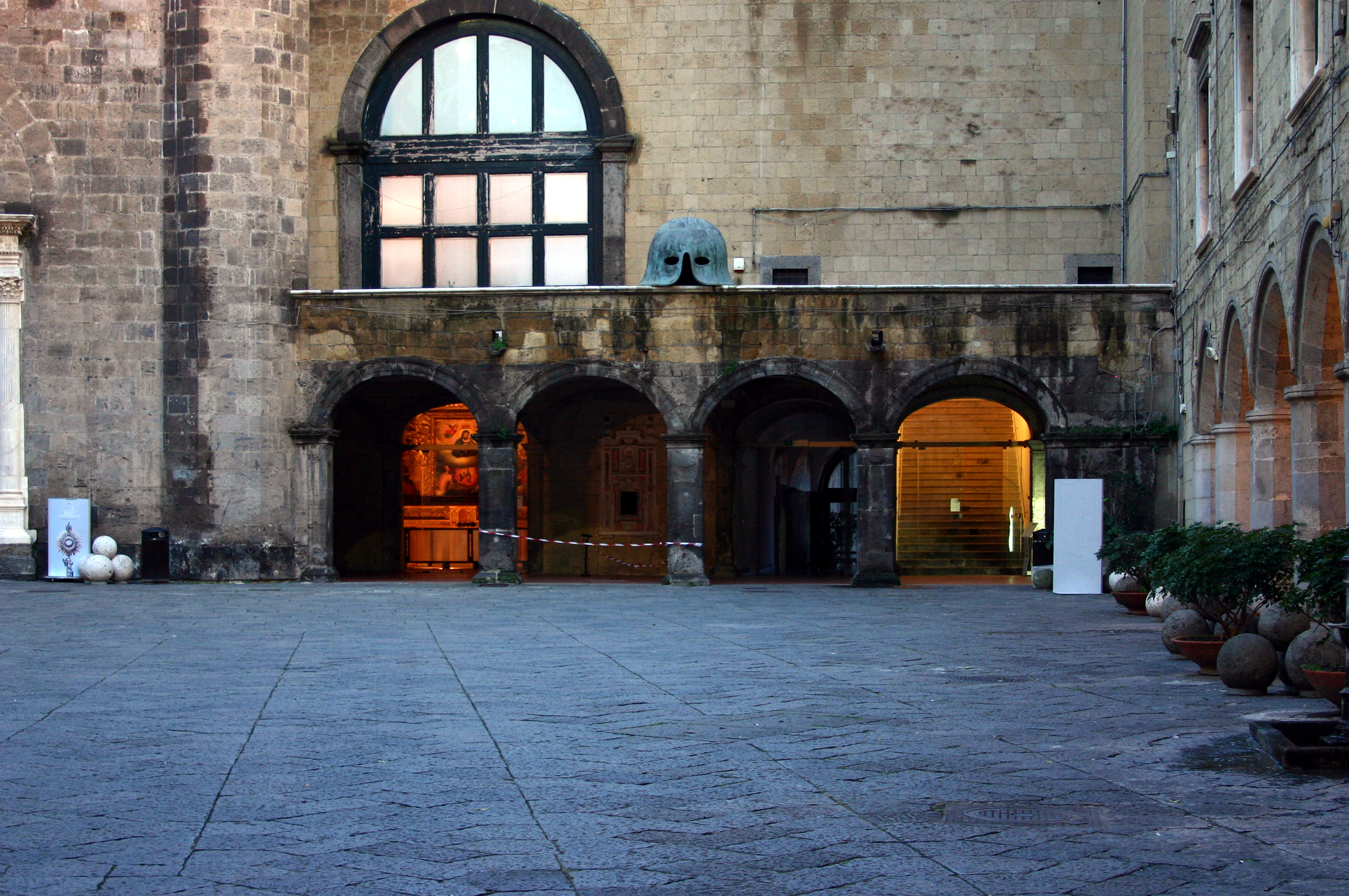
Courtyard of the Chapel of the Souls in Purgatory

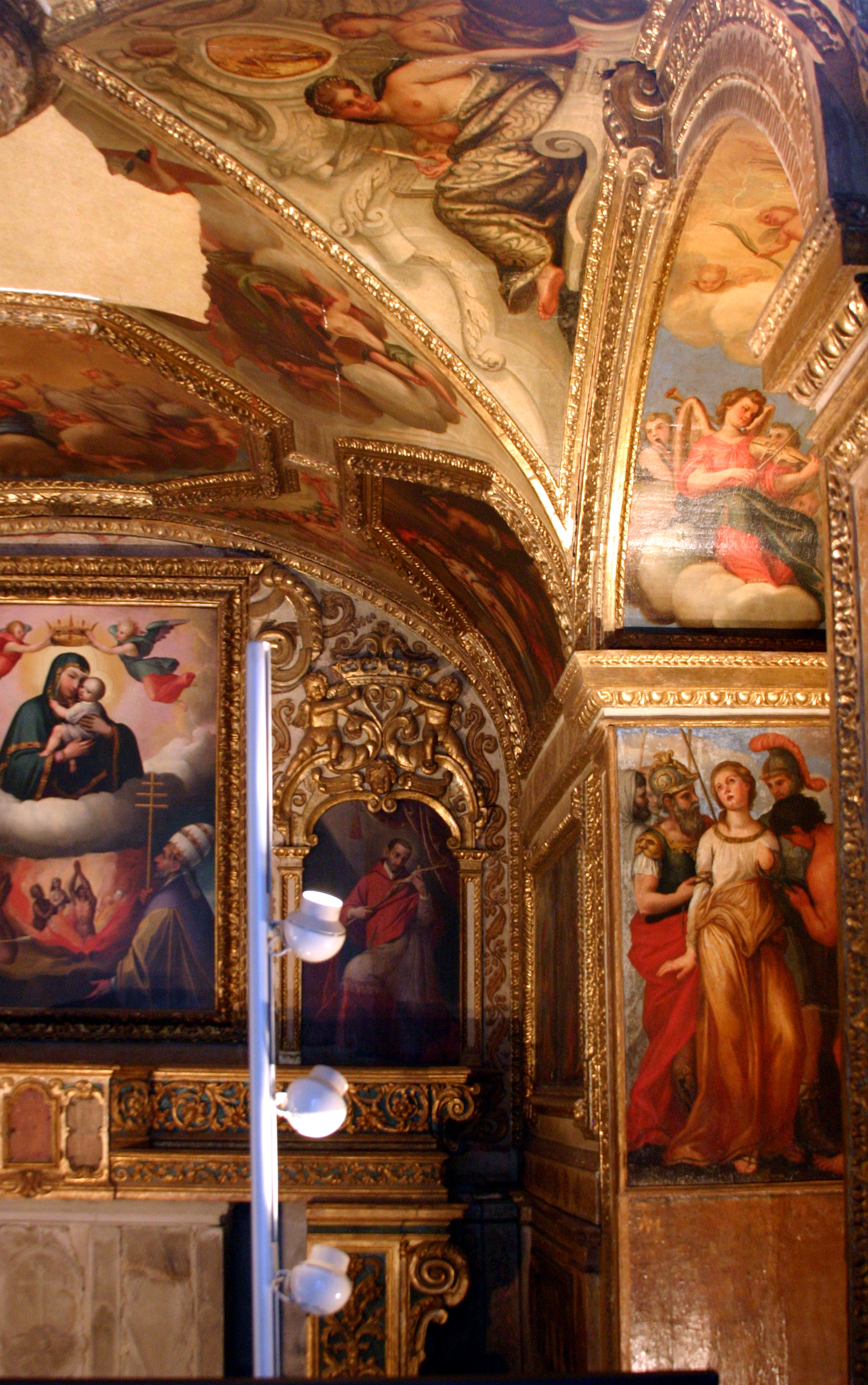
Detail of the interior of the Chapel of the Souls in Purgatory

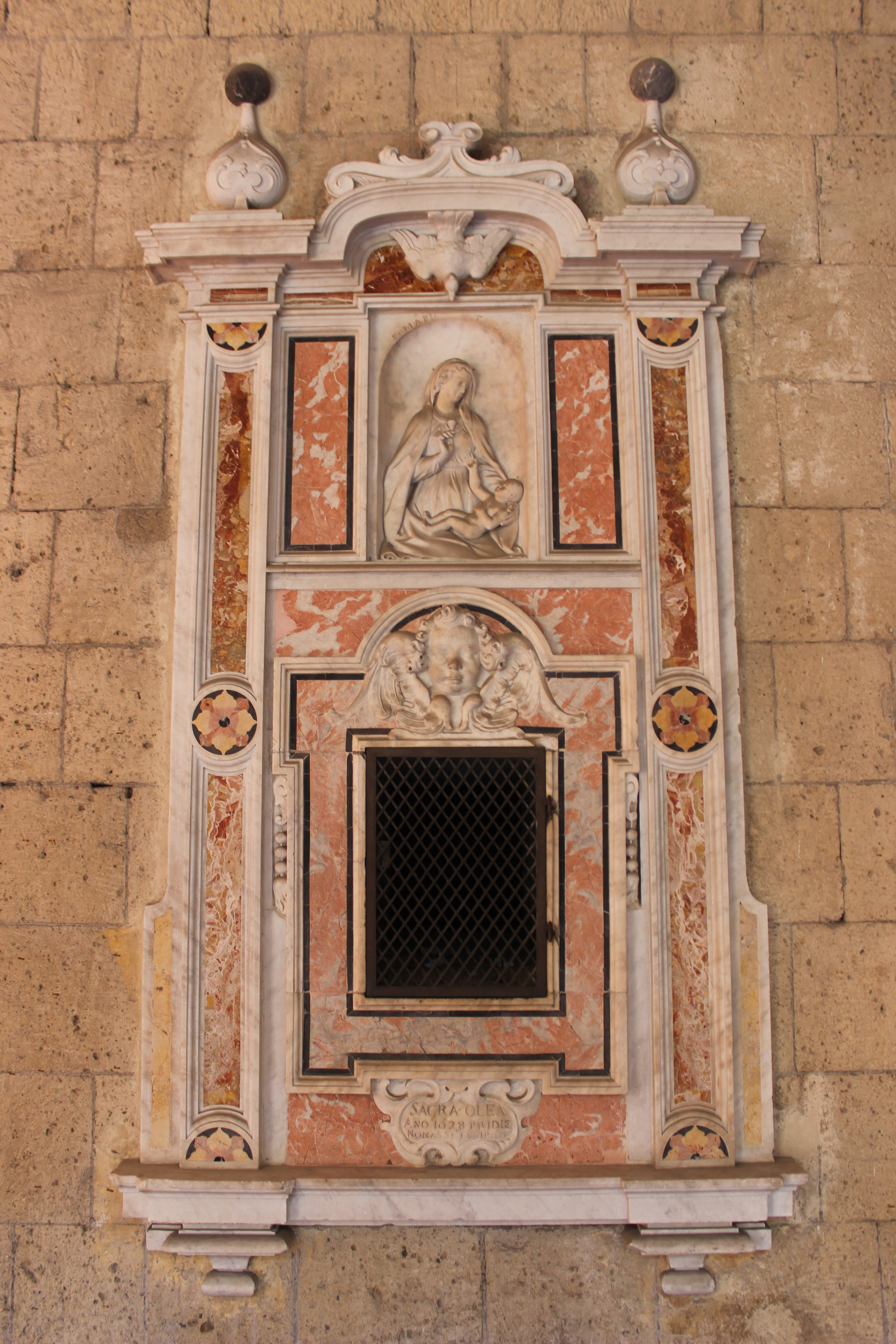
Windows of the Chapel of the Souls in Purgatory

=== Chapel of San Francesco di Paola ===
Small chapel dating back to the 15th century which can be accessed through the Hall Charles V, on the first floor of the castle. The name is given by the fact that it hosted St. Francis of Paola during a trip to Paris.

The 15th-century vault, similar to that of the Hall of the Barons, was designed by Guillem Sagrera, but destroyed during the bombings of World War II.

The chapel was consecrated in 1688, after a refurbishment in the Baroque style, as evidenced by a marble plaque placed on the entrance door.

The only evidence of the time, left in the room, are represented by some decorations in gilded stucco, by two frescoes on the left wall (most likely belonging to a single scene) coming from the 14th-century cloister of Chiesa of Santa Maria Donnaregina Vecchia and the presence of three paintings by Nicola Russo; the Visitation, the Annunciation and the Journey of Mary Bethlehem.

=== Prisons ===
The vaults are made up of two areas located in the space under the Palatine Chapel: the Pit of the Crocodile and the Prison of the Barons.

The Pit of the Crocodile, also known as that of the Miglio, was the warehouse of the Aragonese court, but it was also used to segregate prisoners condemned to harsher penalties. An old legend tells of frequent and mysterious disappearances of the prisoners due to which vigilance was increased. It was not long before these disappearances happened because of a crocodile that penetrated from an opening in the basement and dragged the prisoners by the leg after biting them. Once they had discovered this they were subjected to the jaws of the reptile all the condemned who wanted to be sent to death without too much sensation.

Later to kill the crocodile a large leg of horse was used as bait and, once dead, was stuffed and hooked on the entrance door of the castle. This legend may be the source of the popular assumption that all castle-moats have crocodiles or other man-eating animals in works of fiction.

In the Pit of the Barons instead, four coffins are presented to the visitors without any inscription and are probably those of the nobles who took part in Conspiracy of the Barons in 1485.

== Civic museum ==
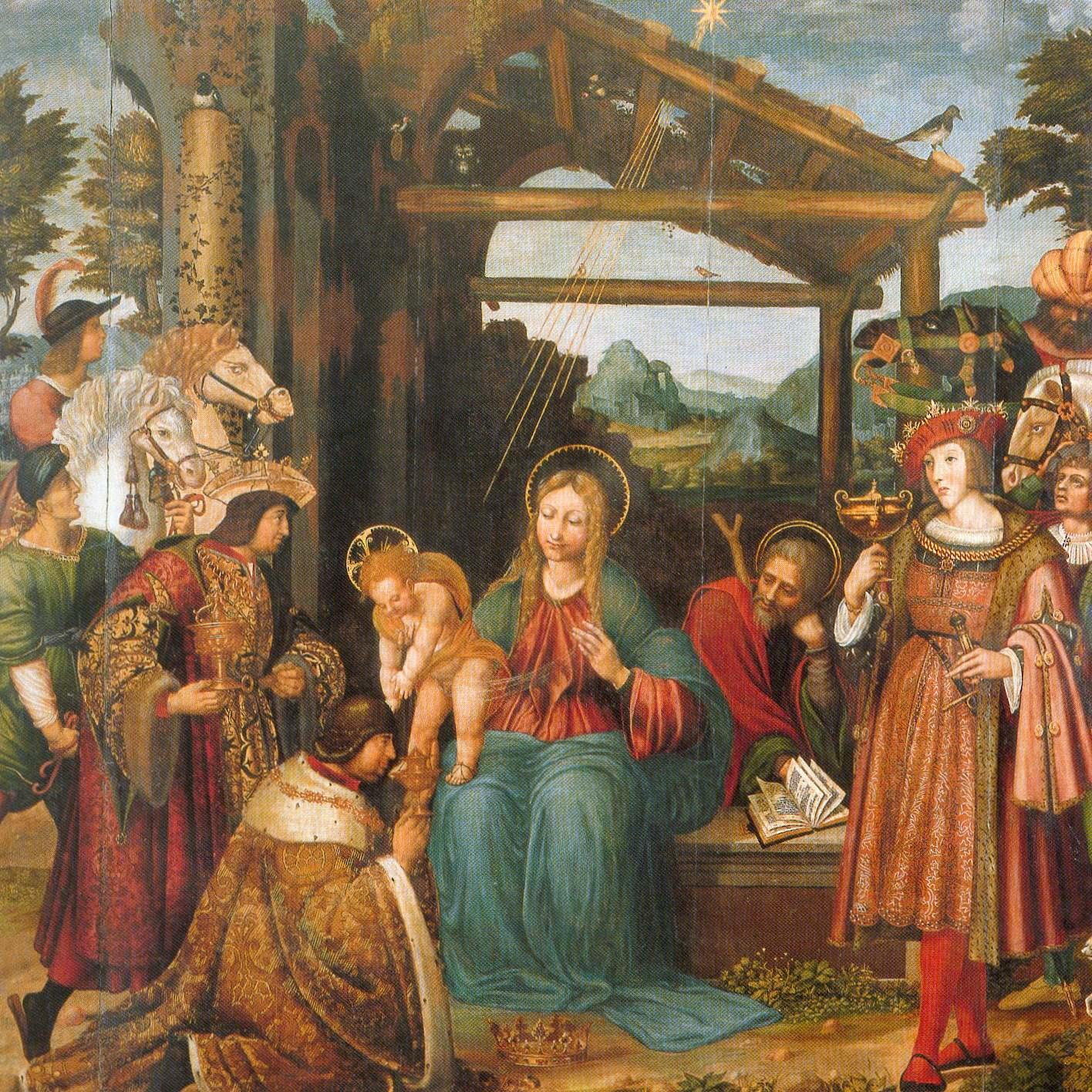
A painting housed in the Civic Museum

Inside the Castel Nuovo there is a museum itinerary inaugurated in 1990 which starts from the 14th-century Palatine Chapel, passing through the Armory Room up to the first and second level of the castle, the latter destined for painting and sculpture.

On the first floor there are frescoes and paintings essentially of religious commissions, belonging from the 15th to 18th centuries. There are paintings by important Caravaggisti artists as Battistello Caracciolo and Fabrizio Santafede, and important exponents of the Neapolitan Baroque, as Luca Giordano, Francesco Solimena and Mattia Preti. On the second floor there are exhibited works ranging from the 18th to 20th centuries. The exhibition follows a thematic order: history, landscapes, portraits, views of Naples.

Other halls of the castle, such as the Hall of Charles V and the Loggia Room, are finally destined for temporary cultural exhibitions and initiatives.

== Library of the Neapolitan Society of Homeland History ==
On the second floor and on the third floor is the Library of the Neapolitan Society of Homeland History. The library has book, iconographic, documentary and parchment collections. It is a private library, therefore access is governed by rules set by the Articles of Association and prescribed in the Rules.

The library contains one of the first books printed in Italy (the fourth), the De civitate Dei of Augustine of Hippo made in June 1467 at Subiaco by two German clerics: Arnold Pannartz and Konrad Sweynheim.

== See also ==
- Gotico Angioino
- List of castles in Italy
- Castel Gandolfo
- Santa Barbara dei Cannonieri, Naples

== Bibliography ==
- Agostino, Catalano (2001). Castelnuovo. Architettura e tecnica. I castelli di Napoli. Naples: Luciano. ISBN 88-8814-133-2.
- Colonna di Stigliano, Ferdinando (1892). Notizie storiche di Castelnuovo in Napoli. Naples: Giannini.
- Filangieri, Riccardo (1934). Castel Nuovo: reggia angioina ed aragonese di Napoli. Naples: EPSA - Editrice Politecnica.
- Galati, V. Riflessioni sulla reggia di Castelnuovo a Napoli: morfologie architettoniche e tecniche costruttive. Un univoco cantiere antiquario tra Donatello e Lon Battista Alberti?, Bulletin of the Florentine Studies Society, 16-17, 2007-2008.
- Hersey, George L. (1973). The Aragonese arch at Naples, 1443-1475. Yale University Press. ISBN 0-300-01611-5 – via archive.org.
- Moschitti De’ Benavides, Luigi (1905). Il Maschio Angioino: Notizie e ricordi di Castel Nuovo. Naples: Stabilimento Priore.
- Paoletta, Erminio (1985). Storia, arte e latino nella bronzea porta di Castel Nuovo a Napoli. Naples: Laurenziana.
- Pirovine, Eugenio (1974). Napoli e i sui castelli tra storia e leggende. Napoli: Edizioni del Delfino.
- Romano, Anna; Di Mauro, Leonardo (1999). Mura e castelli: Castel dell'Ovo, Castel Nuovo, Castel Sant'Elmo. Valori di Napoli. Naples: Pubblicomit. ISBN 88-8631-923-1.
- Ruggiero, Gennaro (1995). I castelli di Napoli. Vol. 5. Naples: Newton & Compton. ISBN 88-7983-760-5.
- Santoro, Lucio (1982). Castelli angioini e aragonesi nel regno di Napoli. Rusconi. ISBN 88-1835-845-6.
