= Paseo Sagrera =

Street in Palma de Mallorca

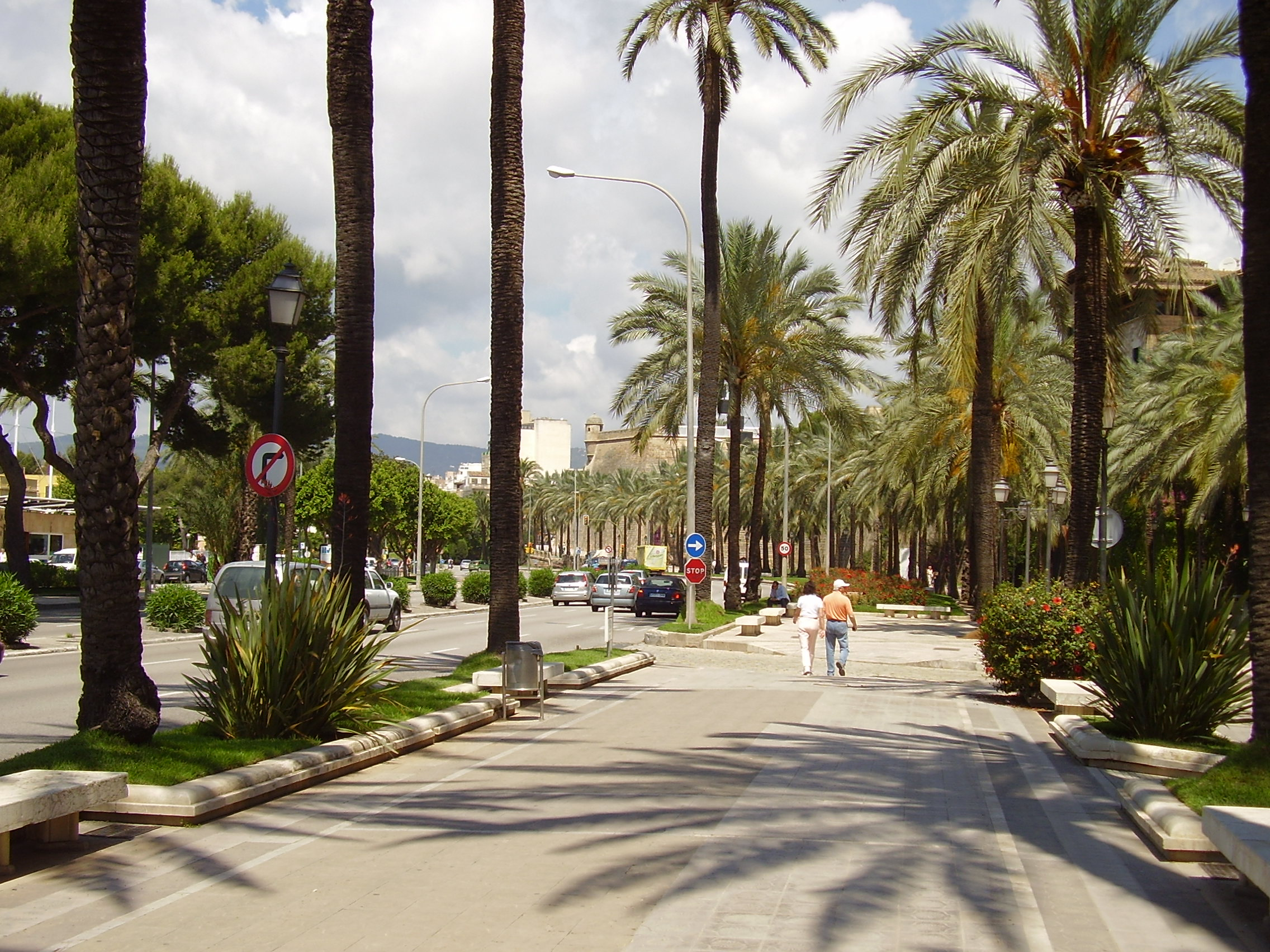

The Paseo Sagrera (Catalan: Passeig Sagrera) is a street c. 500 m long in Palma de Mallorca, the capital of the Balearic Islands, Spain. It was built in 1910 for the Balearic Regional Exhibition. The street extends from the beginning of Av. Antonio Maura - along with the Muelle Viejo - to the torrent of the Riera. The Lonja de Palma de Mallorca is located on the street.

The street takes its name from Guillem Sagrera, the architect of a Gothic building on the street.
