= Montano d'Arezzo =

Italian painter

Madonna and Child from Monastery of Monte Vergine, attributed to the artist

Montano d'Arezzo flourished about the end of the 13th, and the commencement of the 14th, centuries. In 1305 he painted two chapels of the Castel Nuovo, and in 1306 two chapels of the Castel del Uovo, at Naples. He was a favourite of King Robert, who knighted him in 1310. The chapel of the Monastery of Monte Vergine, near Avellino, has a picture of the Madonna said to be by him. The Dormitory dei Giovannetti of the Seminario Urhano, at Naples, has a half-length picture of a Bishop by him. The dates of Montano d'Arezzo's birth and death are no longer known, and little can now be found belonging to this artist.
