= Fortitudo =

Fortitudo means courage or fortitude. It may also refer to:

- Fortitudo (planet), also known Xi Aquilae b
- Fortitudo-Pro Roma S.G.S., a sports society in Rome, formerly named "Fortitudo"
- Cosenza Calcio 1914, soccer team in Cosenza formerly named "Fortitudo"
- Cosenza Calcio, soccer team in Cosenza formerly named "Fortitudo"
- Fortitudo Bologna, sports teams from Bologna named Fortitudo
- ST Fortitudo, an Italian tugboat

== See also ==
- Fortitude (disambiguation)
