= Fortitude (ship) =

Several ships have been named Fortitude:

- Fortitude (1780 EIC ship) was a merchant vessel built in 1780 on the River Thames. A French frigate captured her in 1782 while she was on the return leg of her maiden voyage to India as an East Indiaman for the British East India Company (EIC). However, the British recaptured her in October 1782. The EIC purchased her and sent her back to England. There, in 1785, George Macartney Macauley purchased her and renamed her Pitt. She then performed five voyages for the British East India Company (EIC) between 1786 and 1798. In between, she made one journey transporting convicts from England to New South Wales. She was broken up in 1801.
- Fortitude (1804 ship) was launched at Calcutta in 1804. In 1806 she carried Chinese labourers to Trinidad for the British East India Company; she was seized in Trinidad, sold, and sailed to England. From 1808 on she was a West Indiaman. She was lost circa 1812.
- Fortitude (1842 ship) was a barque launched at Scarborough in 1842. In the 1840s she brought free settlers to the colonies of South Australia and Queensland. Thereafter she sailed to India and China, and made one more voyage carrying female immigrants to Port Phillip. She was wrecked circa 1866.

== See also ==
- HMS Fortitude, either of two vessels of the British Royal Navy
- USS Fortitude
