= Ian Cooke (musician) =

Australian-born American musician

- Born: Adelaide, South Australia
- Origin: Denver, Colorado, USA
- Genres: Indie rock; progressive rock
- Occupation: Musician
- Instruments: Piano, cello
- Years active: 2000–present
- Labels: Popshop; Greater Than Collective
- Formerly of: Uphollow

Ian Cooke is a musician from Denver, Colorado, United States, born in Adelaide, South Australia. His band includes Sean Merrell (drums, vocals), Whit Sibley (bass, vocals) and Ian O'Dougherty (producer, guitar, piano). Cooke has collaborated with many Denver area musicians: Isaac Slade of The Fray, Paper Bird, Laura Goldhamer, The Gamits, Andy Thomas, Esmé Patterson, Julie Davis and Joseph Pope III from Nathaniel Rateliff's band, and others. Cooke has shared the stage with artists such as Crooked Fingers, Flaming Lips, Dresden Dolls, Rasputina, Blonde Redhead, Paper Bird, Devotchka, Wovenhand, Shenandoah Davis, The Lumineers and The Head & The Heart, among others.

== History ==
Cooke was born in Adelaide, Australia, and grew up in Greeley, Colorado, learning to play the piano at age five and cello at eleven. In 2000, Cooke met Ian ODougherty of the Denver, Colorado band Uphollow and relocated to Denver to join the band and play piano and cello on Uphollow's 2002 album, Ten Fingers. Along with ODougherty, bassist Whit Sibley, and drummer Justin Ferreira, they then wrote and recorded 2005's Jackets For The Trip, which included four of Cooke's songs. The album was recorded and mixed by O'Dougherty, with a master and 5.1 surround sound mix by Robert Ferbrache, mix engineer for 16 Horsepower, Wovenhand, Slim Cessna's Auto Club, The Frantix, The Fluid, and others – along with visuals for all of the songs by Zach Putnam. Westword's Jason Heller said the album was "flush with a baroque, folk-pop lushness" Wanting to establish his own songwriting identity, he start playing solo shows and released a five-song EP in 2005. In 2007, Cooke released his first full-length, The Fall I Fell. Produced by O'Dougherty, and mixed with Robert Ferbrache, the album built an audience for Cooke in Colorado which he started to extend with consistent touring. The album was well received. Dave Herrera, of Westword, said "If Sufjan Stevens had been weaned on nothing but recordings by Tchaikovsky, Mozart, Bach and "Eleanor Rigby," his take on chamber pop might sound something like Cooke's work. But as it stands, Cooke makes Stevens' elaborate compositions seem almost prosaic."

=== 2008–present ===
In 2008, he continued to tour and played cello on Crooked Fingers Forfeit/Fortune album, alongside Neko Case and Tom Hagerman of Devotchka. The Fall I Fell received a DVD release in 2009, adding a surround mix by Robert Ferbrache, along with music videos and live footage. The Denver Post said "The record flirted with Rufus Wainwright-style orchestral blasts that backed Cooke's dexterous vocals, which jumped octaves with enviable precision." In 2011, he contributed two songs to a Joanna Newsom cover album, Versions of Joanna, alongside Billy Bragg, M. Ward, Ben Sollee, Owen Pallett, and many others. Soon after, he released his second album, Fortitude. In 2012 he collaborated with Denver-based children's choir 303 Choir to produce a new version of Cooke's song "Rover". The collaboration was documented by 1930pictures and Ian ODougherty and released via a screening, and then hosted on vimeo and Colorado Public Radio. In October 2013 he released an animated video for one of the songs from Fortitude, "Cassowary & Fruit Bat". The release also featured a 44-page book, including a documentary about the making of the song and the animated video, along with over two hours of video from other songs on Fortitude, as well as from The Fall I Fell. Animator Adam Singer describes the process, as well as Cooke, O'Dougherty, Sibley, and Merrell. In early 2014 he and his band collaborated with modern dance company Wonderbound on a series of performances of the show "Gone West".

His long-awaited Dinosaur concept album was released in September 2015, with Westword Magazine calling Antiquasauria "...the years most ambitious Denver album".

In April 2017, Cooke re-released The Fall I Fell including a new surround mix and live footage. In October of the same year, The Flight I Flew was released in conjunction with a live dance collaboration with Denver-based dance company Wonderbound.

== Recognition ==
"Cooke, his cello and his looping effects pedal are now fixtures — icons, even — in Denver's thriving independent music community." - Ricardo Baca, The Denver Post Spin (magazine) called Cooke "a one-man chamber ensemble." "Ian Cooke specializes in forlorn folk built on cello-heavy arrangements and vocals that mimic his instrument's mournful modulations. His music's got its freakier moments, but Cooke's ambitious complex compositions mark him as kindred spirit to Sufjan Stevens and Joanna Newsom."

"astonishingly talented cellist/songwriter from Denver", writes KEXP DJ and musician Sean Nelson

Colorado Public Radio said of Fortitude: "It’s a marvelous, sophisticated effort with at least one song about dinosaurs." Cooke developed a dedicated following within the Denver music community.

The Denver Post said "Cooke’s 2007 opus The Fall I Fell remains one of the most memorable Denver releases of the last decade, and his new album “Fortitude” is an artful, literate follow-up.

== Discography ==
=== Studio albums ===
- The Flight I Flew (October 2017) Popshop Records
- Antiquasauria (September 2015) Greater Than Collective
- Cassowary and Fruit Bat book (October 2013) Popshop Records
- Fortitude (January 2012) Greater Than Collective
- The Fall I Fell (April 2007) Popshop Records
