= HMS Fortitude =

Two ships and a shore establishment of the Royal Navy have borne the name HMS Fortitude:

Ships

- HMS Fortitude (1780) was a 74-gun third rate launched in 1780. She became a prison ship in 1795, a powder hulk in 1802, and was broken up in 1820.
- HMS Fortitude was launched in 1807 as the 74-gun third-rate HMS Cumberland. She became a prison ship in 1830, was renamed Fortitude in 1833, and was sold in 1870.

Shore establishments

- HMS Fortitude (shore establishment) was the naval base at Ardrossan, commissioned in 1940 and paid off in 1945.
  - HMS Fortitude II was the Coastal Forces base at Ardrossan, commissioned in 1941. The base was on the navy list in 1944, but not in 1942.

== See also ==
- Fortitude (1780 EIC ship), launched in 1780 as a British East Indiaman
- Fortitude (ship), launched in 1842 transported immigrants to Brisbane in 1848–1849, for which Fortitude Valley is named
