= USS Fortitude =

USS Fortitude may refer to the following ships operated by the United States Navy:

- USS Fortitude (AMc-81), was an Accentor-class coastal minesweeper during World War Two
- HSV Fortitude (JHSV-3), original name for USNS Millinocket (T-EPF-3) before the Navy took over the project
