= Guillem Sagrera =

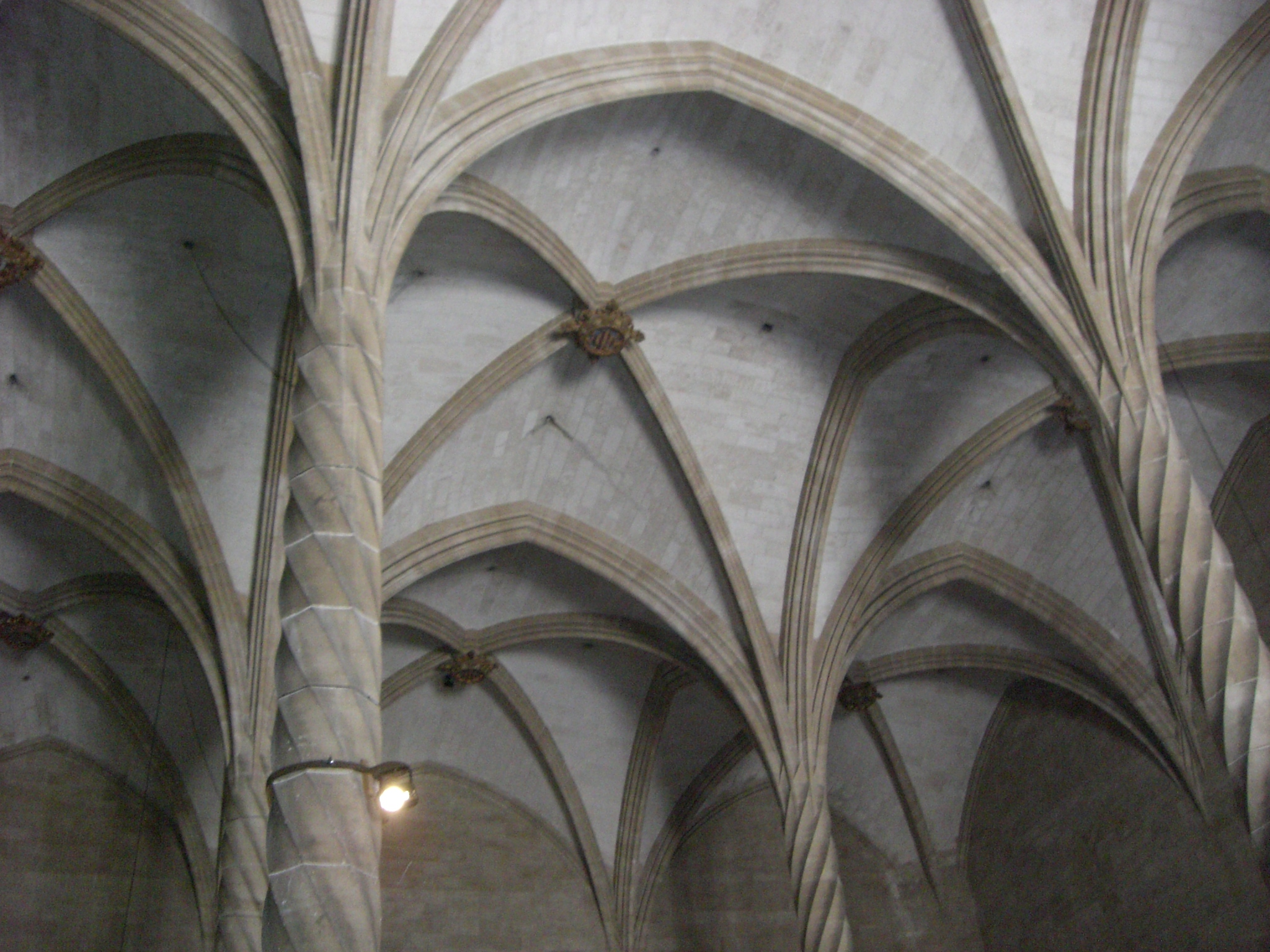
Vaults of the Llotja dels Mercaders, Palma.

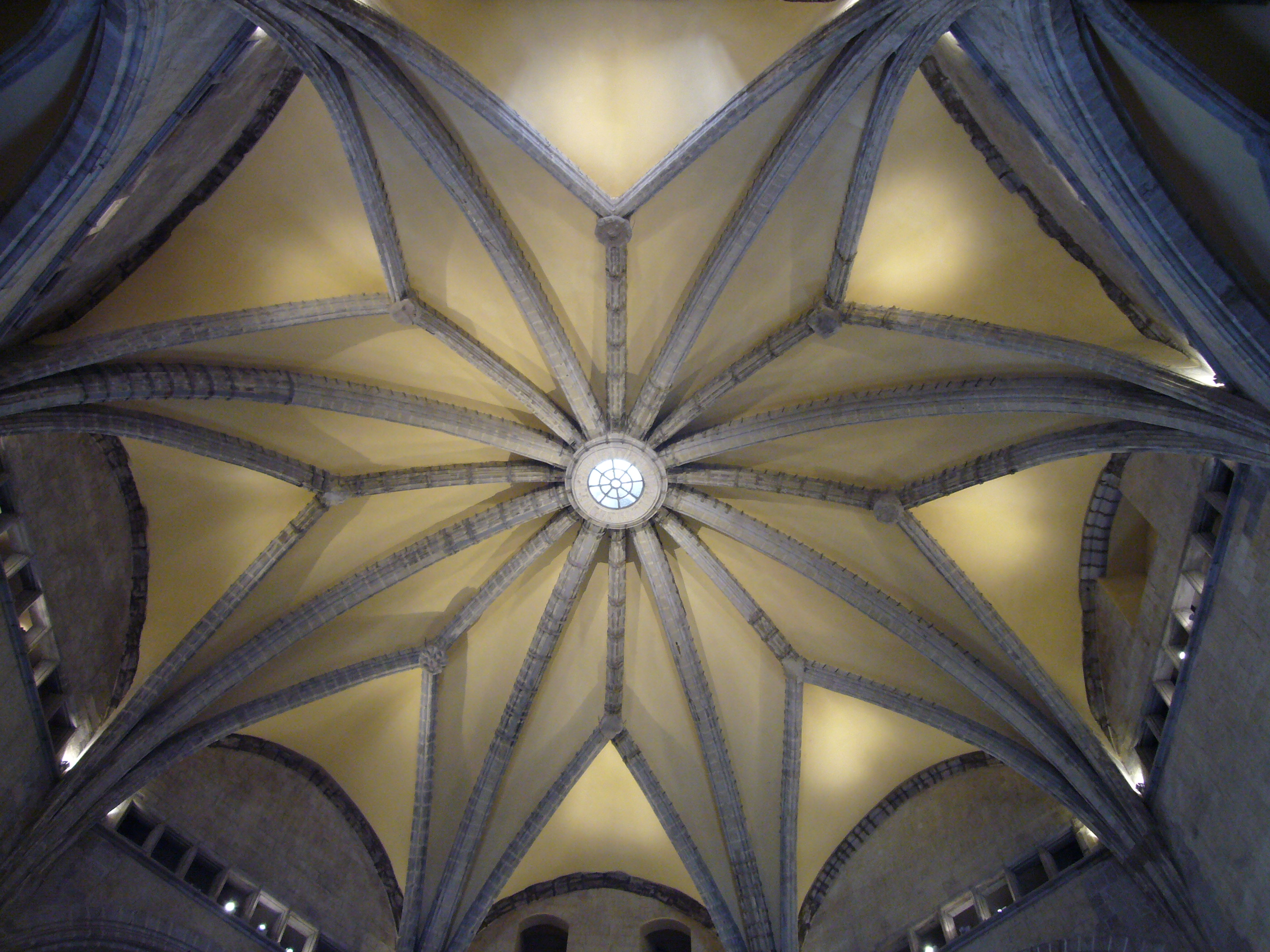
Vault of the Barons' Hall in the Castel Nuovo, Naples.

Guillem Sagrera (Felanitx, Mallorca ca. 1380–Naples, 1456) was a Spanish Gothic sculptor and architect from Majorca.

A native of Felanitx, in Mallorca, in the early 15th century he was director of the works of the Cathedral of Perpignan (then part of the Kingdom of Mallorca) in late-Gothic style; in the same style is La Seu Cathedral of Palma de Mallorca, in which he also served as director of the works. In Palma is also what is considered his masterwork, the Llotja dels Mercaders (1426–1447).

He also worked at the court of Alfonso V of Aragon in Naples, where he restored the Castel Nuovo, redesigning its plan and adding several loggias and the Barons Hall.

He died in 1456 in Naples.
