= Collage (disambiguation) =

A collage is a work of visual arts, constituted of heterogeneous parts stuck together.

Collage or Kollage may also refer to:

== Music ==
=== Performers ===
- Collage (American band)
- Collage (American duo)
- Kollage (band), an Indian band
- Collage (Italian band)
- Collage (Taiwanese duo)

=== Albums ===
- Kollage (album), an album by Bahamadia
- Collage (EP), a 2016 EP by the Chainsmokers
- Collage (M'Boom album) (1970)
- Collage (Le Orme album) (1971)
- Collage (Karrin Allyson album) (1996)
- Collage (Ratt album) (1997)
- Collage (U-KISS album) (2013)
- Collage (Paul Revere and the Raiders album), 1970
- Collage, an EP (and title song) by Vital Sines

=== Other ===
- Collage (Horner), a 2015 French horn concerto by James Horner
- "Collage", a song by James Gang from Yer' Album
- "Collage", a song by Gunna from One of Wun
- "Kollage", a song by Carly Rae Jepsen from the 2023 album The Loveliest Time

== Other uses ==
- Collage (geology), a tectonic unit type in geology
- Collages (novel), a 1964 novel by Anaïs Nin

== See also ==
- College (disambiguation)
- Montage (disambiguation)
- Collagen, a structural protein
- Collange, a French surname
