= College (disambiguation) =

A college is an educational institution or a constituent part of an educational institution.

College may also refer to:

== Groups ==
- College (Catholic canon law), a collection of persons to form one body
- College (corporation), an incorporated body of persons
- College (division), a division of a higher education institution focusing on related subject areas
- Electoral college, electors who are selected to elect a candidate to a particular office
- Regulatory college, a legal entity in Canada charged with serving the public interest by regulating the practice of a profession

== Organizations ==
- College of Bishops, the body of all bishops of the Catholic Church
- College of Cardinals, the body of all cardinals of the Catholic Church
- College of Pontiffs, a body of the ancient Roman state
- College of War, a state institution of the Russian Empire in charge of military affairs
- War College (Sweden), an administrative state institution in Sweden serving its land forces

== Places ==
- College, Alaska, a census-designated place in Fairbanks North Star Borough, Alaska
- College (PNR), a commuter rail station in Calamba, Laguna, Philippines
- College (Preston ward), an electoral ward and district of Preston, Lancashire, England
- College (Southwark ward), an electoral ward in Southwark, Greater London, England
- College (TTC), a subway station in Toronto, Ontario, Canada
- College Township (disambiguation)

== Arts, entertainment, and media ==
- College (1927 film), a comedy-drama silent film starring Buster Keaton
- College (1931 film), a 1931 Walter Lantz cartoon
- College (1984 film), an Italian film
- College (2008 film), a comedy
- College (TV series), a 1990 Italian TV series
- "College" (30 Rock), the eighth episode of the fifth season
- "College" (The Sopranos), the fifth episode of the first season
- College (musical project), an electronica music project by David Grellier

== See also ==
- Collage (disambiguation)
