= Order of chivalry =

Order, confraternity or society of knights

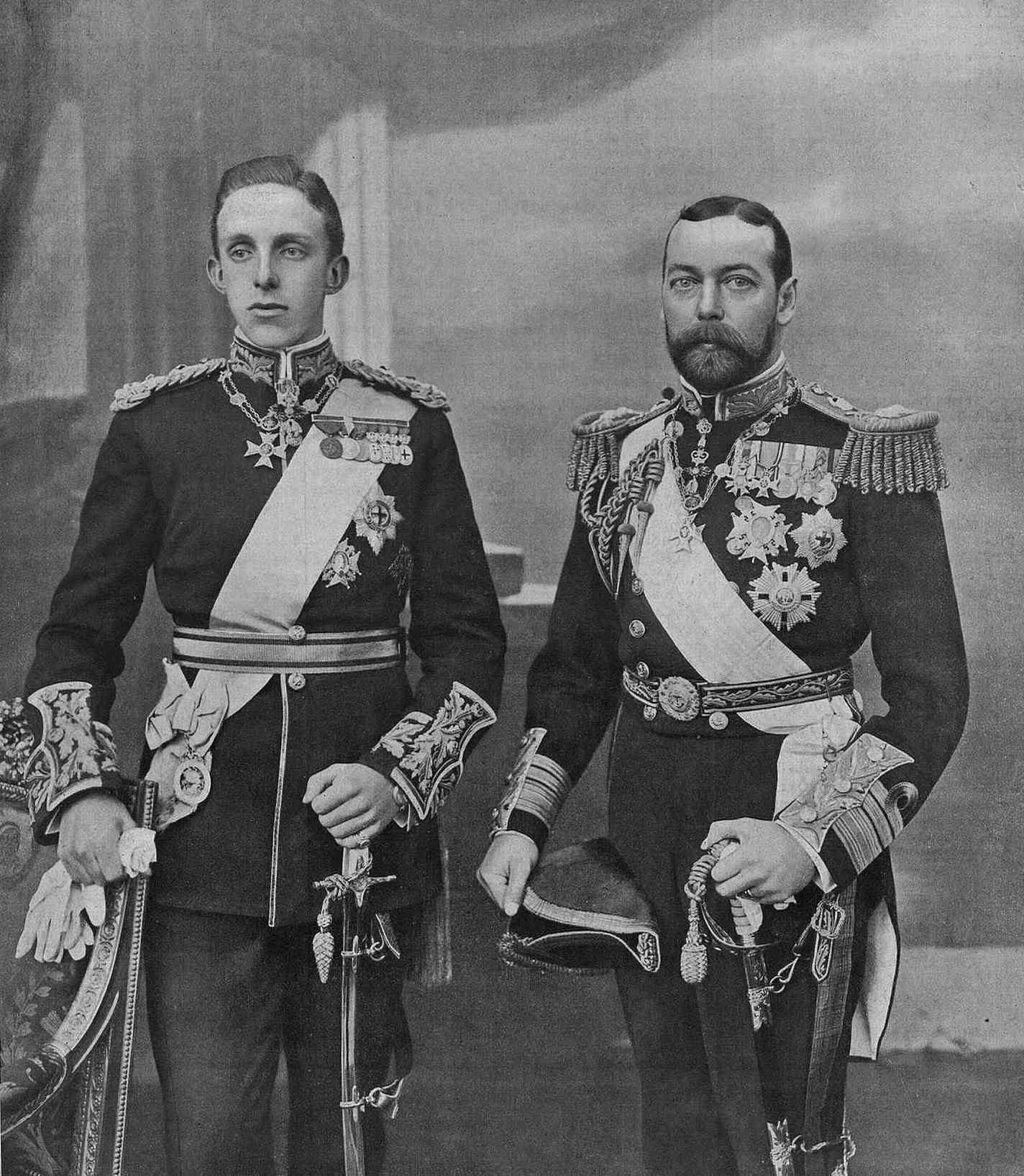
Alfonso XIII of Spain (left) with his cousin-in-law, the future King George V (right), during his State Visit to the United Kingdom in 1905. Alfonso is wearing the uniform of a general of the British Army, the Royal Victorian Chain, the sash and star of the Garter, the cross of the Order of Charles III, the neck badge of the Golden Fleece, and the badge of the four Spanish military orders. George, then Prince of Wales, is wearing the neck badge of the Golden Fleece, the sash and grand cross grade of the Order of Charles III, the Royal Victorian Chain, and the stars of the Garter and the Order of St Michael and St George.

An order of chivalry, order of knighthood, chivalric order, or equestrian order is a society, fellowship and college of knights, typically founded during or inspired by the original Christian military orders of the Crusades (c. 1099–1291) and paired with medieval concepts of ideals of chivalry.

Since the 15th century, orders of chivalry, often as dynastic orders, began to be established in a more courtly fashion than could be created ad hoc. These orders would often retain the notion of being a confraternity, society or other association of members, but some of them were ultimately purely honorific and consisted of a medal decoration. In fact, these decorations themselves often came to be known informally as orders. These institutions in turn gave rise to the modern-day orders of merit of sovereign states.

== Overview ==
An order of knights is a community of knights composed by order rules with the main purpose of an ideal or charitable task. The original ideal lay in monachus et miles (monk and knight), who in the order – ordo (Latin for 'order' / 'status') – is dedicated to a Christian purpose. The first orders of knights were religious orders that were founded to protect and guide pilgrims to the Holy Land. The knightly orders were characterized by an order-like community life in poverty, obedience and chastity, which was linked with charitable tasks, armed pilgrimage protection and military action against external and occasionally internal enemies of Christianity. Examples are the Knights Templar, Knights of the Holy Sepulchre officially called The Equestrian Order of the Holy Sepulchre of Jerusalem, founded in 1090, the Order of St. John and the Order of Malta. These communities only became orders in the sense of canon law through papal recognition of their own binding rules of order and through the dissolution of ecclesiastical diocesan organizations.

In addition to the religious orders of knights, courtly orders of knights emerged in many European royal houses from the middle of the 14th century. This enabled the monarchs and princes to create a reliable household power independent of the church and to combine their court life with knightly virtues. During this time, the Burgundian court culture was leading and so the Order of the Golden Fleece, founded there in 1430, was for many a model in the sense of a princely order based on the ideals of Christian chivalry.

In the course of time, many orders of knights have been dissolved due to a lack of people or the field of activity has changed. So in many areas the charitable aspect and nursing came to the fore. There were also dissolutions for political reasons, such as the Knights Templar in 1312 or many orders of knights as opposition by Nazi Germany. While the Knights Templar was not re-established, some orders were reactivated after the end of World War II and the fall of the Iron Curtain. As the bestowal of knighthoods or damehoods are considered prestigious, the German loanword ordenshunger ("hunger for orders") became used to describe those who desired membership in multiple orders of chivalry.

There are repeated attempts to revive or restore old orders of knights. Often, old knight orders are used today to honor personalities. For example, the British Queen Elizabeth II regularly appointed new members to the Order of the British Empire in the 21st century. In Central Europe, for example, the Order of St. George, whose roots also go back to the so-called "last knight" Emperor Maximilian I, was reactivated by the House of Habsburg after its dissolution by Nazi Germany. Meanwhile, to this day, deserved personalities in republican France are highlighted by being awarded the Knight of the Legion of Honour. In contrast, the knights of the ecclesiastical orders of knights such as the Sovereign Military Order of Malta and the Order of Saint John mainly devote themselves to social tasks, medicine, nursing and care.

== Terminology ==
=== Holy See ===
The Secretariat of the State of the Holy See – medieval pioneer of the original military orders – distinguishes orders in the following manner:

- State orders or orders of merit: order of a sovereign state, rewarding military or civil merits of citizens, legally based on the sovereignty of their states
- Pontifical equestrian orders
  - collazioni diretti: conferred by the Pope
  - subcollazioni: under the protection of the Holy See (Teutonic Order and Order of the Holy Sepulchre)
- Sovereign orders: the only extant one in this category is the Sovereign Military Order of Malta, an international sovereign entity
- Dynastic orders of a sovereign royal dynasty, either an active "dynastic state order" (e.g. Order of the Garter), otherwise a "non-national dynastic order", as the head of a formerly reigning royal house operating under ius collationis (right to confer), typically approved by Papal bulls in the case of older origins (e.g. Order of Saints Maurice and Lazarus)

=== Sansovino ===
In Dell'origine dei Cavalieri (1566), the Italian scholar Francesco Sansovino (1521–1586) distinguished knights and their respective societies in three main categories:

- "Knights of Collar", i.e. dynastic orders of knighthood
- "Knights of the Cross", i.e. religious military orders
- "Knights of Spur", i.e. knighted by the sovereign, later also by feudal lords and knights elderly (e.g. Knight Bachelor)

Over time, the above division became no longer sufficient, and heraldic science distinguished orders into: hereditary, military, religious and fees.

=== Boulton ===
In a more generous distribution proposed in The Knights in the Crown: The Monarchical Orders of Knighthood in Late Medieval Europe (1987), the Canadian heraldist D'Arcy Boulton classifies chivalric orders as follows:

- Monarchical orders (i.e. dynastic orders of knighthood)
- Confraternal orders (as seen in military orders)
- Fraternal orders
- Votive orders
- Cliental pseudo-orders
- Honorific orders

Based on Boulton, this article distinguishes:

- Chivalric orders by time of foundation:
  - Medieval chivalric orders: foundation of the order during the Middle Ages or the Renaissance
  - Modern chivalric orders: foundation after 1789
- Chivalric orders by religion:
  - Catholic chivalric orders: membership exclusively for members of the Catholic Church
  - Orthodox chivalric orders: blessed by the heads of Orthodox churches
  - Protestant chivalric orders: blessed by the heads of Protestant churches
- Chivalric orders by purpose:
  - Monarchical chivalric orders: foundation by a monarch who is a fount of honour; either ruling or not
  - Confraternal chivalric orders: foundation by a nobleman, either high nobility or low nobility
  - Fraternal chivalric orders: founded for a specific purpose only
  - Votive chivalric orders: founded for a limited period of time only by members who take a vow
  - Honorific chivalric orders: consist only of honorific insignia bestowed on knights on festive occasions, consisting of nothing but the badge
  - Self-styled orders: self-proclaimed imitation-orders without statutes or restricted memberships

=== Military orders by time ===
Another occurrent chronological categorisation is into:

- Military-monastic orders (c. 1100–1291), beginning with the Order of Saint John of Jerusalem
- Monarchical orders (c. 1330 – c. 1470), beginning with the Order of Saint George (Kingdom of Hungary). Most military-monastic orders (except the Teutonic Order and the Order of Saint John) became parts of this category during the 15th and 16th century (e.g. the Order of Santiago)
- Honorific orders (c. 1580–present), beginning with the Order of Saint Stephen (despite its military obligations) and the Order of the Holy Spirit. With the Order of Saint Louis, the time of proper orders of merit begun. The monarchical orders became de facto honours during the shift from feudalism to absolutism.

== Medieval orders ==
=== Monarchical orders ===
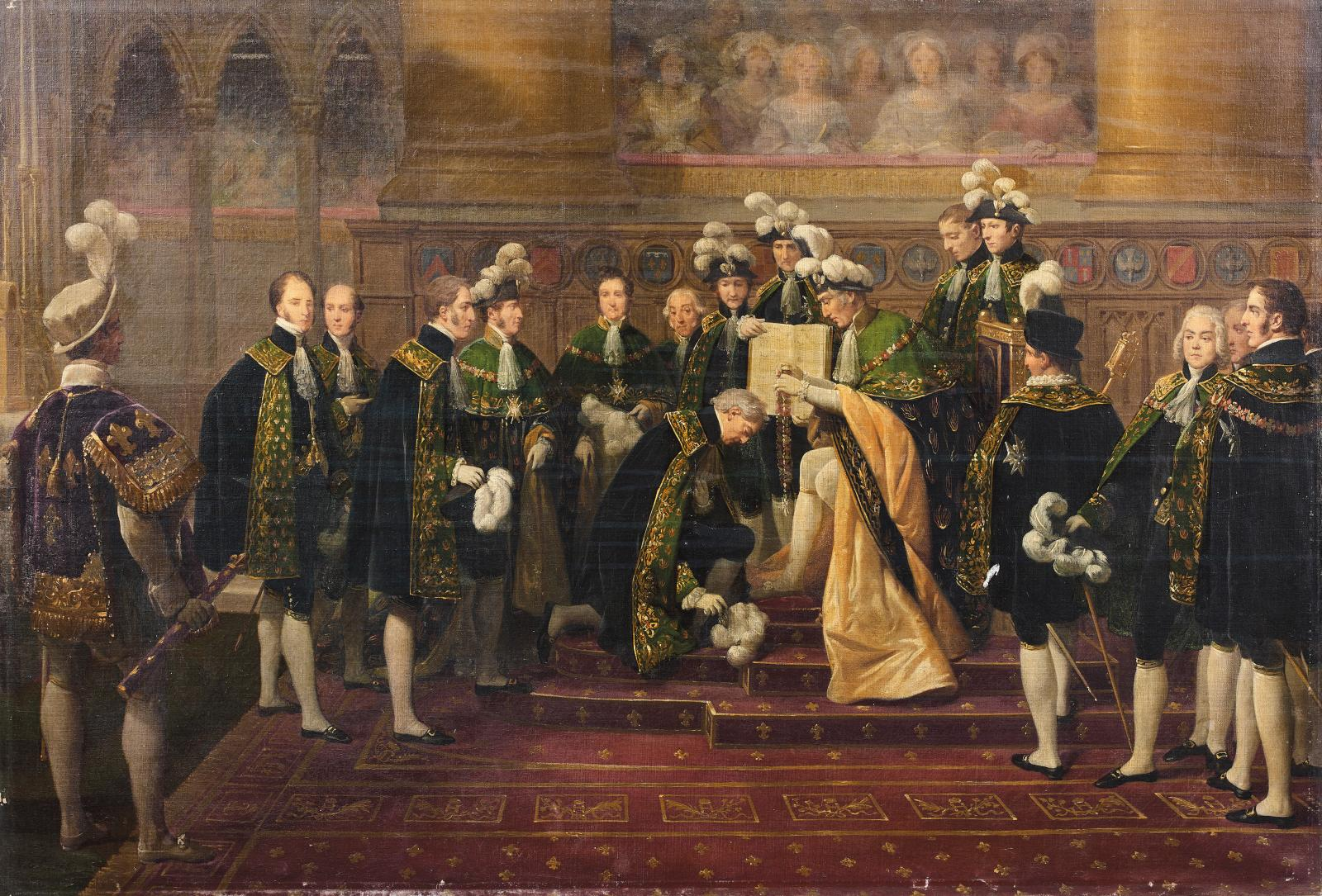
Investiture of the new members of the Order of the Holy Spirit, (1825).

==== Late medieval monarchical orders (14th and 15th centuries) ====
Late medieval monarchical orders (14th and 15th centuries) are orders of chivalry with the presidency attached to a monarch.

- Order of Montesa founded by James II of Aragon (Spain) in 1317
- Order of Saint George, founded by Charles I of Hungary in 1325
- Order of the Band, founded by Alfonso XI of Castile in c. 1330
- Order of the Sword (Cyprus), founded by Peter I of Cyprus in 1347 (allegedly)
- Order of the Garter, founded by Edward III of England in 1348
- Order of the Star, founded by John II of France in 1351
- Order of the Knot, founded by Louis I of Naples in 1352
- Supreme Order of the Most Holy Annunciation, founded by Amadeus VI, Count of Savoy in 1362
- Order of the Ermine, founded by John V, Duke of Brittany in 1381: First order to accept women.
- Order of the Ship, founded by Charles III of Naples on 1 December 1381
- Order of the Dragon, founded by Sigismund, as king of Hungary in 1408
- Order of the Golden Fleece, founded by Philip III, Duke of Burgundy in 1430
- Order of the Tower and Sword, founded by Afonso V of Portugal in 1459
- Order of Saint Michael, founded by Louis XI of France in 1469

==== Post-medieval foundations of chivalric orders ====
- Order of Saint Stephen (1561)
- Order of the Holy Spirit, founded by Henri III of France in 1578
- Blood of Jesus Christ (military order) (1608)
- Order of the Thistle (1687)
- Order of the Elephant (1693)
- Order of Saint Louis, founded by Louis XIV of France in 1694
- Order of the Seraphim (1748)
- Order of Saint Stephen of Hungary (1764)
- Order of St. Patrick (1783)
- Order of Saint Joseph (1807)
- Order of Guadalupe (1821)
- Order of the Mexican Eagle (1865)
- Order of Saint Charles (1866)

==== Monarchical orders whose monarch no longer reigns but continues to bestow the order ====
- Order of Saints Maurice and Lazarus (Italian House of Savoy)
- Order of Merit of Savoy (Italian House of Savoy)
- Order of the Golden Fleece (Austrian branch)
- Order of St. George (Habsburg-Lorraine)
- Order of the Holy Spirit
- Order of Prince Danilo I of Montenegro
- Order of Saint Peter of Cetinje
- Order of Skanderbeg
- Royal Order of Saint George for the Defense of the Immaculate Conception (Bavaria)
- Order of the Crown (Romania)
- Order of Carol I (Romania)
- Order of the Immaculate Conception of Vila Viçosa (Portugal)
- Order of Saint Michael of the Wing (Portugal)
- Sacred Military Constantinian Order of Saint George (Two Sicilies)
- Royal Order of Francis I (Two Sicilies)
- Order of the Eagle of Georgia (Georgia)
- Order of Queen Tamara (Georgia)
- Order of the Crown of Georgia (Georgia)
- Royal Order of the Crown of Hawai'i (Hawai'i)
- Royal and Hashemite Order of the Pearl (North Sulu Bornéo)
- Imperial Order of Solomon (Imperial House of Ethiopia)
- Imperial Order of Solomon's Seal (Imperial House of Ethiopia)
- Imperial Order of the Queen of Sheba (Imperial House of Ethiopia)
- Imperial Order of the Holy Trinity (Imperial House of Ethiopia)
- Imperial Order of Menelik II (Imperial House of Ethiopia)
- Imperial Order of Emperor Haile Selassie I (Imperial House of Ethiopia)
- Imperial Order of the Ethiopian Lion (Imperial House of Ethiopia)
- Imperial Order of the Star of Ethiopia (Imperial House of Ethiopia)
- Imperial Order of Saint Anthony (Imperial House of Ethiopia)
- Imperial Order of the Lion of Mandé (Imperial House of Mandé)

=== Confraternal orders ===
Confraternal orders are orders of chivalry with the presidency attached to a nobleman:

==== Princely orders ====
Princely orders were founded by noblemen of higher rank. Most of these were founded in imitation of the Order of the Golden Fleece, after 1430.

- Order of Saint Catherine, founded by Humbert II, Dauphin du Viennois around 1335
- Order of Saint Anthony, founded by Albrecht I of Bavaria in 1384
- Order of the Rüdenband, founded in Silesia, Upper Lusatia and Bohemia before 1389
- Society of the Eagle, founded by Albrecht II von Habsburg in 1433
- Society of Our Lady (Order of the Swan), founded by Frederick II, Elector of Brandenburg in 1440
- Order of Saint Hubert, founded by Gerhard V of Jülich and Berg in 1444
- Order of the Crescent, founded by René d'Anjou in 1448
- Society of Saint Jerome, founded by Friedrich II of Wettin in 1450
- Order of Saint Joachim, founded by fourteen nobles in 1755

==== Baronial orders ====
Baronial orders were founded by noblemen of lower rank.

- Order of Hubert (Barrois, 1422)
- Noble Order of Saint George of Rougemont, also called Confraternity of Saint-Georges of Burgundy (Franche-Comté, 1440)

=== Fraternal orders ===
Fraternal orders are orders of chivalry that were formed off a vow and for a certain enterprise.

- Companie du Cigne Noir ("Order of the Black Swan"), founded by three princes and 11 knights in Savoy (1350).
- Corps et Ordre du Tiercelet ("Corps and Order of the Tiercel"), founded by the vicomte de Thouars and 17 barons in Poitou (1377–1385).
- Ordre de la Pomme d'Or ("Order of the Golden Apple"), founded by 14 knights in Auvergne (1394).
- Alliance et Compagnie du Levrier ("Alliance and Company of the Greyhound"), founded by 44 knights in Barrois (1416–1422), subsequently converted into the Confraternal Order of Saint Hubert (see above).

=== Votive orders ===
Votive orders were orders of chivalry, temporarily formed on the basis of a vow. These were courtly chivalric games rather than actual pledges as in the case of the fraternal orders. Three are known from their statutes:

- Emprise de l'Escu vert à la Dame Blanche ("Enterprise of the green shield with the white lady"), founded by Jean II Le Maingre (dit Boucicaut) and 12 knights in 1399 for the duration of five years.
- Emprise du Fer de Prisonnier ("Enterprise of the Prisoner's Iron"), founded by John I, Duke of Bourbon and 16 knights in 1415 for the duration of two years.

=== Cliental pseudo-orders ===
Cliental pseudo-orders are not orders of chivalry and were princes' retinues fashionably termed orders. They are without statutes or restricted memberships:

- Ordre de la Cosse de Genêt (Order of the Broom-Pod), founded by Charles VI of France c. 1388
- Order of the Porcupine, created by Louis d'Orléans in 1394
- Order of the Dove, Castile, 1390
- Order of the Scale of Castile, c. 1430

=== Honorific orders ===
Honorific orders were honorific insignia consisting of nothing but the badge:

- Order of the Stoat and the Ear, founded by Francis I, Duke of Brittany in 1448
- Order of the Golden Spur, a papal order (since the 14th century, flourishes in the 16th century)

Together with the monarchical chivalric orders (see above) these honorific orders are the prime ancestors of the modern-day orders of knighthood (see below) which are orders of merit in character.

The distinction between these orders and decorations is somewhat vague, except that these honorific orders still implied membership in a group. Decorations have no such limitations and are awarded purely to recognize the merit or accomplishments of the recipient. Both orders and decorations often come in multiple classes.

==== Influence ====
The orders have influenced organizations which are completely separate and distinct from them. Since at least the 18th century, Freemasonry has incorporated symbols and rituals of several medieval military orders in a number of Masonic bodies, most notably, in the "Red Cross of Constantine" (derived from the Sacred Military Constantinian Order of Saint George), the "Order of Malta" (derived from the Sovereign Military Order of Malta), and the "Order of the Temple" (derived from the historical Knights Templar), the latter two featuring prominently in the York Rite.

== Modern orders ==
Most orders created since the late 17th century were no longer societies and fellowships of knights who followed a common mission but were established by monarchs or governments with the specific purpose of bestowing honours on deserving individuals. In most European monarchies, these new orders retained some outward forms from the medieval orders of chivalry (such as rituals and structure) but were in essence orders of merit, mainly distinguished from their republican counterparts by the fact that members were entitled to a title of nobility. While some orders required noble birth (such as the Order of Saint Stephen of Hungary, established in 1764), others would confer a title upon appointment (such as the Military Order of Max Joseph, established in 1806) while in yet other orders only the top classes were considered knights (such as in the Order of St Michael and St George, established in 1818). Orders of merit which still confer privileges of knighthood are sometimes referred to as orders of knighthood. As a consequence of being not an order of chivalry but orders of merit or decorations, some republican honours have thus avoided the traditional structure found in medieval orders of chivalry and created new ones instead, e.g. the Order of Merit of the Federal Republic of Germany, the Decoration for Services to the Republic of Austria, or the Legion of Merit of the United States.

=== List of current orders ===
- Order of the Holy Sepulchre, one of the original military orders founded circa 1099, and its definite acceptance in 1103 by King Baldwin I.
- Sovereign Military Order of Malta, one of the original military orders, founded as the Order of St. John of Jerusalem in 1048, sanctioned by Pope Paschal II on 15 February 1113.
  - Alliance of the Orders of Saint John of Jerusalem, the federation of the Protestant Hospitaller Orders.
    - Order of Saint John (chartered 1888)
    - Order of Saint John (Bailiwick of Brandenburg)
    - Order of Saint John in Sweden
    - Order of Saint John in the Netherlands
- Teutonic Order, a Catholic religious order founded as a military order in 1190 in Acre, Kingdom of Jerusalem.
- Order of Aviz founded by Afonso I of Portugal in 1146
- Order of Calatrava founded by St. Raymond of Fitero (Spain) in 1164.
- Order of Alcantara founded by Ferdinand II of León (Spain) in 1167.
- Order of Santiago founded Ferdinand II of León (Spain) in 1170.
- Order of Saint James of the Sword founded by Afonso I of Portugal in 1172.
- Order of Montesa founded by James II of Aragon (Spain) in 1317.
- Order of Christ (Portugal), founded by Denis of Portugal in 1319. This order considers itself successor of the Knights Templar.
- Order of the Garter, founded by Edward III of England c. 1348
- Order of the Most Holy Annunciation, founded by Amadeus VI, Count of Savoy in 1362, ceased to be a national order of Italy when the Kingdom became a Republic in 1946, but continues to be awarded by the heir of the last King as the head of the house of Savoy rules in fons honorum.
- Order of the Golden Fleece, founded by Philip III, Duke of Burgundy in 1430
- Knights of the Thistle of Bourbon, founded by Duke of Bourbon in 1370 which today is headed by the Seigneur of Fief Blondel and also includes the Order of Our Lady of the Thistle

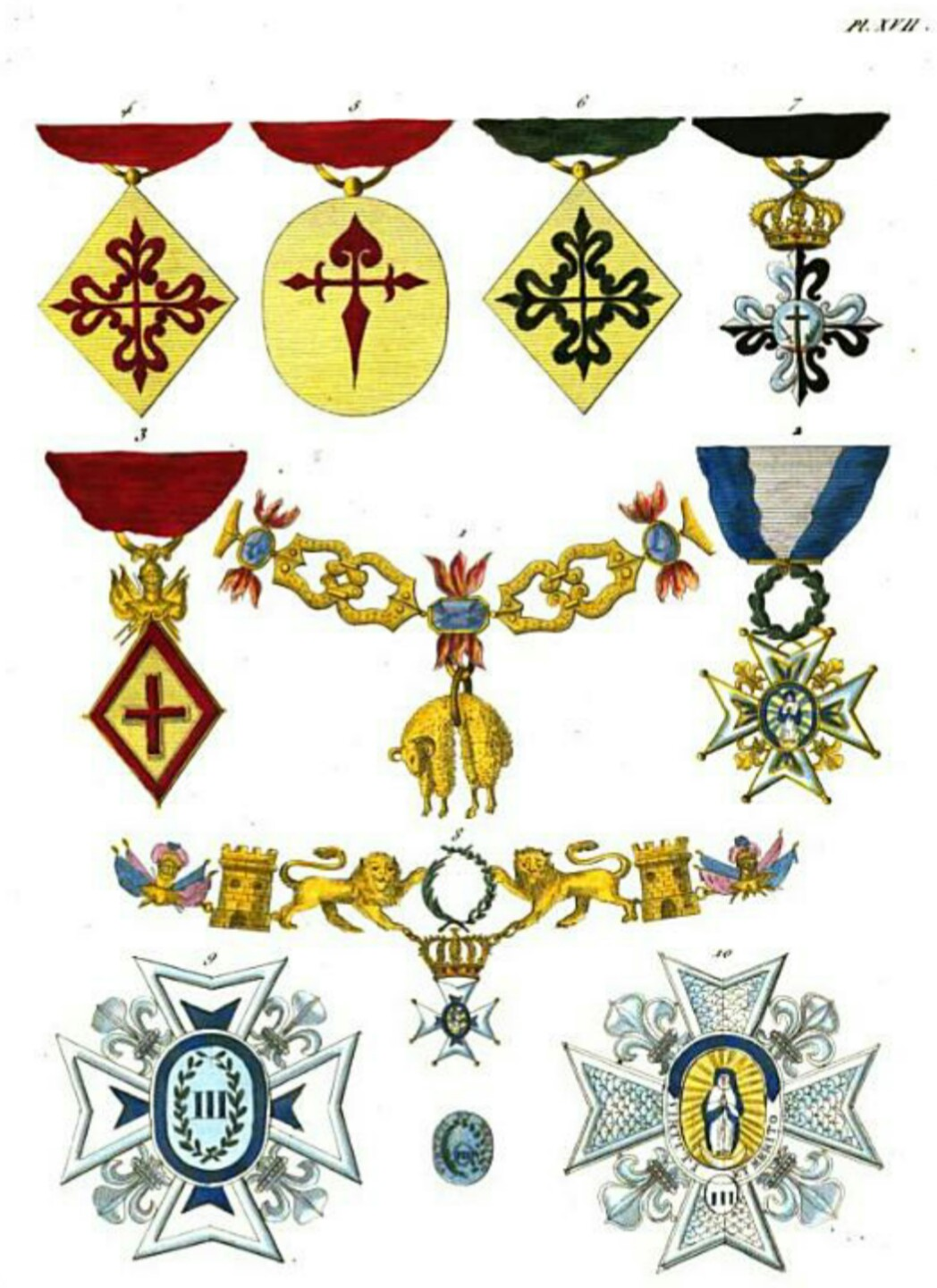
Spanish orders of chivalry. In the centre, the Order of the Golden Fleece, 1820

- Order of the Tower and Sword, founded by Afonso V of Portugal in 1459
- Order of Saints Maurice and Lazarus In 1572, Pope Gregory XIII united the Order of Saint Lazarus in perpetuity with the Crown of Savoy. Emmanuel Philibert, Duke of Savoy, merged it with the Savoyan Order of Saint Maurice, and thenceforth the title of Grand Master of the Order of Saints Maurice and Lazarus was hereditary in that house. 1572
- Order of the Dannebrog, founded by King Christian V of Denmark in 1671
- Order of the Thistle, founded by King James VII of Scotland in 1687
- Order of the Elephant, founded by King Christian V of Denmark in 1693
- Order of St. Andrew, founded by Tsar Peter the Great of Russia in 1698
- Order of the White Eagle, founded by King Augustus II of Poland in 1705
- Order of the Bath, founded by King George I of Great Britain on 18 May 1725
- Order of the Seraphim, founded by Frederick I of Sweden in 1748.
- Order of the Sword, founded by Frederick I of Sweden in 1748 [Dormant between 1974 and 2023].
- Order of the Polar Star, founded by Frederick I of Sweden in 1748.
- Order of Saint Joachim, founded by several notables of the Holy Roman Empire in 1755.
- Order of St. George the Triumphant, founded by Catherine the Great of the Russian Empire in 1769.
- Royal and Distinguished Spanish Order of Carlos III, founded by Charles III of Spain on 19 September 1771 (became a Spanish order)
- Order of Vasa, founded by Gustav III of Sweden in 1772 (Dormant between 1974 and 2023).
- Order of St Patrick, founded by George III of the United Kingdom in 1783 (Not awarded since 1936).
- Order of Charles XIII, founded by Charles XIII of Sweden in 1811.
- Royal Order of Isabella the Catholic, founded by King Ferdinand VII of Spain on 14 March 1815 (became a Spanish order).
- Military William Order, founded by King William I of the Netherlands on 30 April 1815.
- Order of the Netherlands Lion, founded by King William I of the Netherlands on 29 September 1815.
- Order of St Michael and St George, is an order of chivalry founded on 28 April 1818 by George, Prince Regent, later George IV of the United Kingdom, while he was acting as Prince Regent for his father, George III.
- Order of the Southern Cross, founded by Emperor Pedro I of Brazil on 1 December 1822.
- Order of Leopold, founded by King Leopold I of the Belgians on 11 July 1832.
- Royal Norwegian Order of St Olav, founded by King Oscar I of Norway on 21 August 1847.
- Order of Saint John (Bailiwick of Brandenburg), Order founded in 1099 and refounded in 1852.
- Order of the Gold Lion of the House of Nassau, founded by King-Grand Duke William III of Luxembourg in 1858.
- Order of the White Elephant is an order of Thailand. It was established in 1861 by King Rama IV of the Kingdom of Siam.
- Order of the Mexican Eagle, a Mexican Imperial Order founded on 1 January 1865 by Maximilian I of Mexico, renamed the Order of the Aztec Eagle in 1933.
- Order of the Crown of Italy, founded by Victor Emmanuel II, to celebrate the unification of Italy 1868
- Order of Orange-Nassau, founded by the Queen regent Emma of the Netherlands, acting on behalf of her under-age daughter Queen Wilhelmina of the Netherlands on 4 April 1892.
- Royal Victorian Order, founded by Queen Victoria of the United Kingdom on 21 April 1896.
- Order of the Crown, founded by King Leopold II of the Congo Free State on 15 October 1897 (became a Belgian order in 1908).
- Order of Leopold II, founded by King Leopold II of the Congo Free State on 24 August 1900 (became a Belgian order in 1908).
- Order of Monisaraphon (or Muni Isvarabarna): founded by King Sisowath of Cambodia on 1 February 1905.
- Order of Michael the Brave, founded by King Ferdinand I of Romania on 26 September 1916.
- Order of the British Empire, founded by King George V of the United Kingdom on 4 June 1917.
- Knightly Order of Vitéz, founded by Miklós Horthy the Regent of Hungary in 1921.
- Order of the Knights of the Southern Cross Australia, founded by the Catholic Bishops of Australia in 1919.
- Order of Skanderbeg, founded by Zog I of Albania in 1925.
- Order of Civil Merit, founded by King Alfonso XIII of Spain in 1926.
- Order of the Crown of King Zvonimir, founded by Ante Pavelić the Poglavnik of Croatia in 1941.
- Order of the Sun, founded by Man Singh II, the Maharaja of Jaipur in 1947.
- Royal Order of Sahametrei, founded by King Norodom Sihanouk of the Kingdom of Cambodia on 9 September 1948.
- Order of the Knights of Rizal, granted a legislative charter by President of the Philippines Elpidio Quirino on 14 June 1951.
- Order of Canada, founded by Queen Elizabeth II of Canada in 1967.
- Order of Australia, founded by Queen Elizabeth II of Australia in 1975.
- Order of Merit of Savoy, founded by Vittorio Emanuele, Prince of Naples in 1988.
- New Zealand Order of Merit, founded by Queen Elizabeth II of New Zealand in 1996.

=== List of former orders ===
- Order of Saint Lazarus, founded in 1098 at a leper hospital in the Latin Kingdom of Jerusalem and is one of the lesser known orders.
- Order of Saint Stanislaus, founded by King Stanislaus II Augustus Poniatowski of Poland in 1765
- Ludwigsorden (Order of Louis) of the Grand Duchy of Hesse, founded 1807, abolished 1918
- Order of the Iron Helmet of Hesse-Kassel (or Hesse-Cassel) (in present-day Germany), founded 1814, abolished 1866
- Wilhelmsorden (Order of Wilhelm) of Hesse-Kassel, founded 1851, abolished 1875
- Order of the Star of India, founded by Queen Victoria in 1861 and has not been awarded since the independence of India in 1947
- Order of the Indian Empire, founded by Queen Victoria in 1878 and has not been awarded since the independence of India in 1947
- Order of the African Star, founded by King Leopold II of the Congo Free State on 30 December 1888, which became a Belgian order in 1908 and has not been awarded since the independence of Congo in 1960
- Royal Order of the Lion, founded by King Leopold II of the Congo Free State on 9 April 1891, which became a Belgian order in 1908 and has not been awarded since the independence of Congo in 1960
- Order of the Norwegian Lion, founded 1904, abolished 1952
- Order of Pahlavi, founded 1928 by Reza Shah, abolished 1979 after the Iranian Revolution. There were two classes. The first class, the Grand Collar, was worn by the Shah, crown prince, and awarded to heads of state. The second class, the Grand Cordon, was worn by princes and princesses.

== Typical insignia and ranks ==
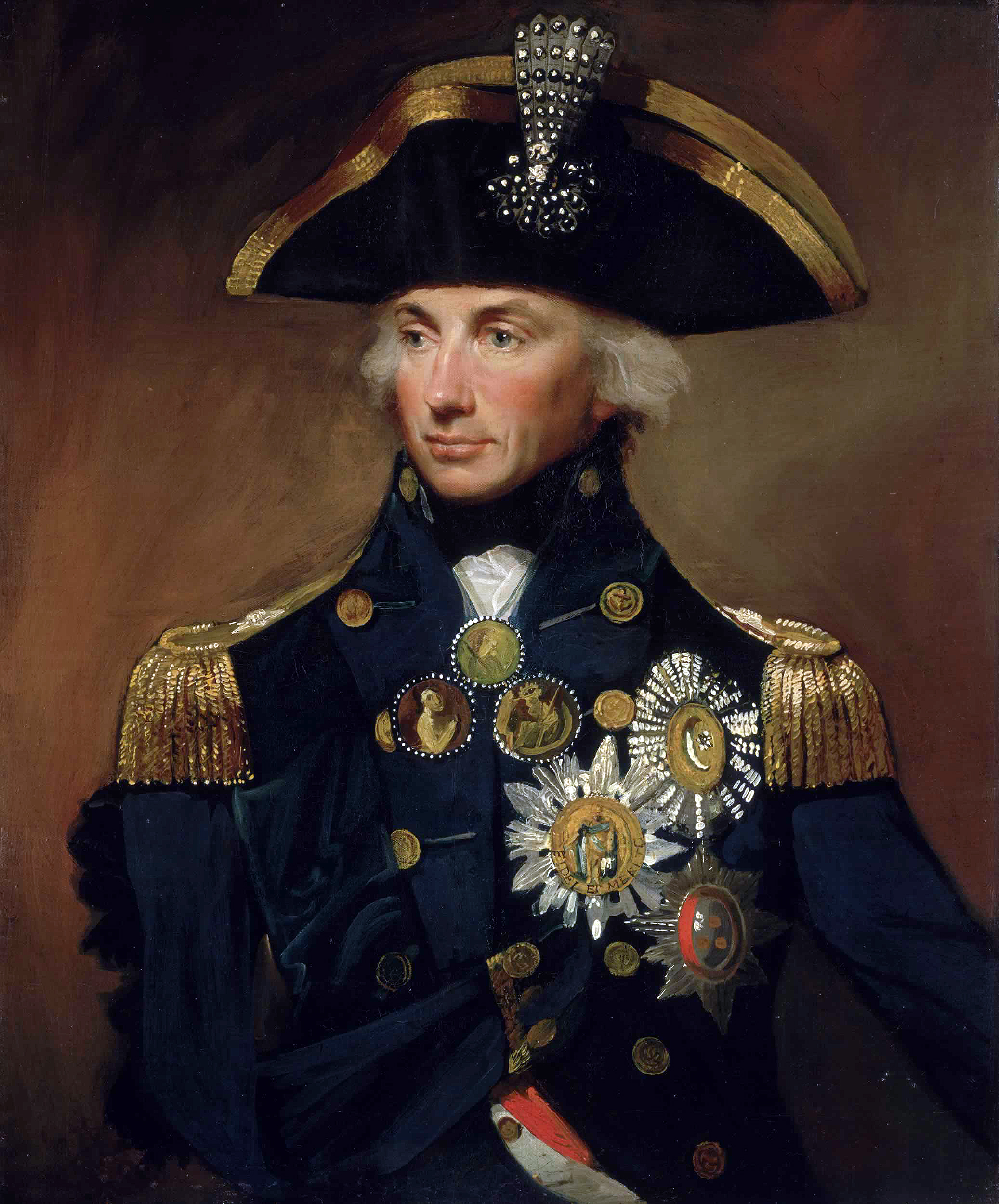
Lemuel Francis Abbott's portrait of Admiral Lord Nelson depicting his honours embroidered on his coat jacket

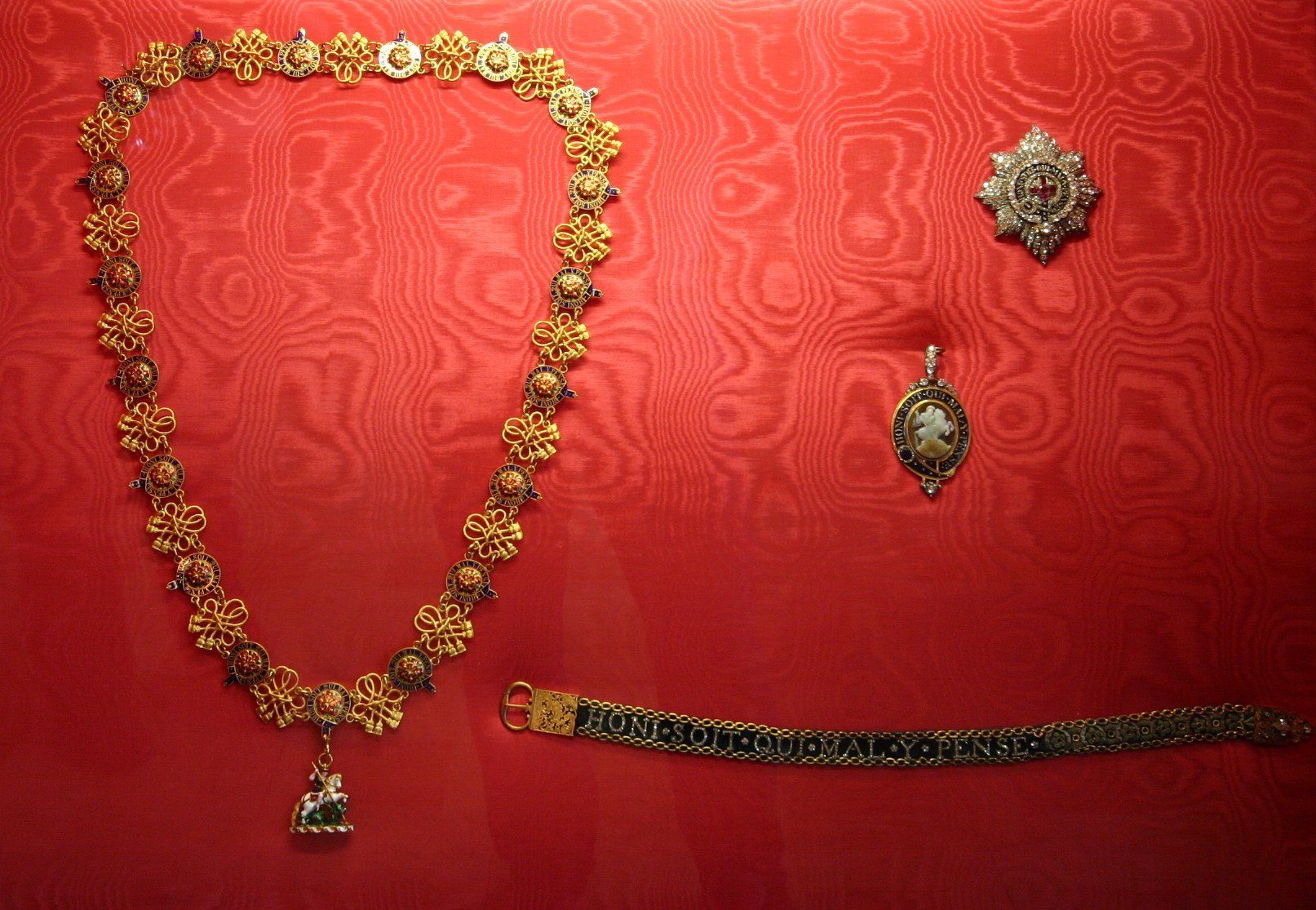
Insignia of the British Order of the Garter.

Following the example set by the French Legion of Honour, founded by Napoleon, most multi-level European orders comprise five ranks or classes. The highest is usually called the Grand Cross, then descending with varying titles. Alternatively, the ranks are referred to by number (for example "1st class" instead of "Grand Cross"). Typical rankings are:

Class	Common names
I	Grand Cross, Commander Grand Cross, Grand Cordon, Grand Collar
II	Grand Officer, Commander 1st Class, Grand Commander, Knight Commander, Knight Companion, Commander with Star, Commodore
III	Commander, Commander 2nd Class, Companion
IV	Officer, Knight 1st Class, Member 1st Class
V	Knight, Knight 2nd Class, Chevalier, Cavaliere, Member

Each of these ranks wear insignia, usually badge (often enamelled) on a ribbon. Typically these insignia are worn from a sash in the case of the senior ranks, around the neck for the middle ranks (see also neck decorations), and on the left chest for the lower grades. Many orders use insignia in the form of a cross, but there may also be stars, and military awards may have crossed swords added onto the insignias. Ladies may wear the badge on a bow on the left chest. In orders following the example set by the French Legion of Honour, the two highest classes also wear a star (or plaque) on the chest. In special cases the senior class may wear the badge on a collar, which is an elaborate chain around the neck.

In certain countries with feudal heritage the higher ranks (usually at least the Grand Cross) may have vestments proper to them, including a robe or mantle and a hat. An example of such a modern-day order is the Order of the British Empire.

The French Legion of Honour democratised the honour systems of orders of chivalry and merit in the sense of formally omitting both the expectations of nobility on admittees while also no further implying the same status on previously non-noble conferees. Yet some orders may still expect noble ancestry on the part of recipients, such as the Sovereign Military Order of Malta and those of the Alliance of the Orders of Saint John of Jerusalem. Others may continue to imply conferral of nobility on any admittee, whether hereditary or personal, such as in some of the cases of dynastic orders conferred by the House of Bavaria or the House of Imperial Russia.

== Self-styled orders ==
Some organisations claim to be chivalric orders but are actually private membership organisations that have not been created by a state or a reigning monarch. The answer to the question of whether an order is legitimate or not varies from nation to nation, François Velde wrote an "order of knighthood is legitimate if it is defined as legal, recognized and acknowledged as such by a sovereign authority. Within its borders, a sovereign state does as it pleases. Most, if not all, modern states have honorific orders and decorations of some kind, and those are sometimes called orders of knighthood." Exactly what makes one order legitimate and another self-styled or false is a matter of debate with some arguing that any monarch (reigning or not) or even the descendants of such can create an order while others assert that only a government with actual internationally recognized authority has such power (regardless of whether that government is republican or monarchical in nature). Historically, nobility and knights have also formed Orders of Knighthood. The Noble Order of Saint George of Rougemont is a Baronial Order and the Ordre de la Pomme d'Or was founded by 14 knights in Auvergne in 1394.

== Gallery ==
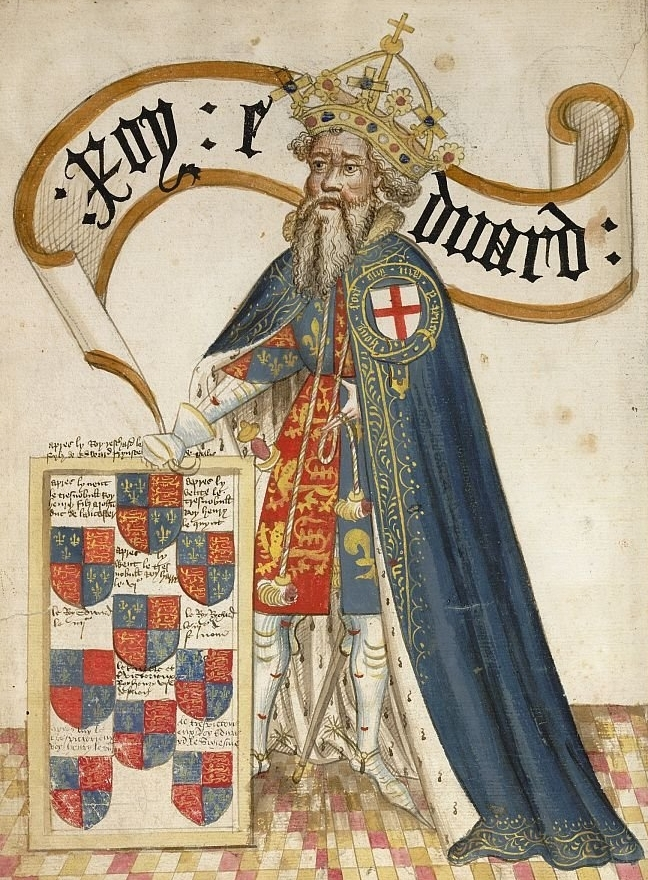
Order of the Garter (1348)

Order of the Star (1351)

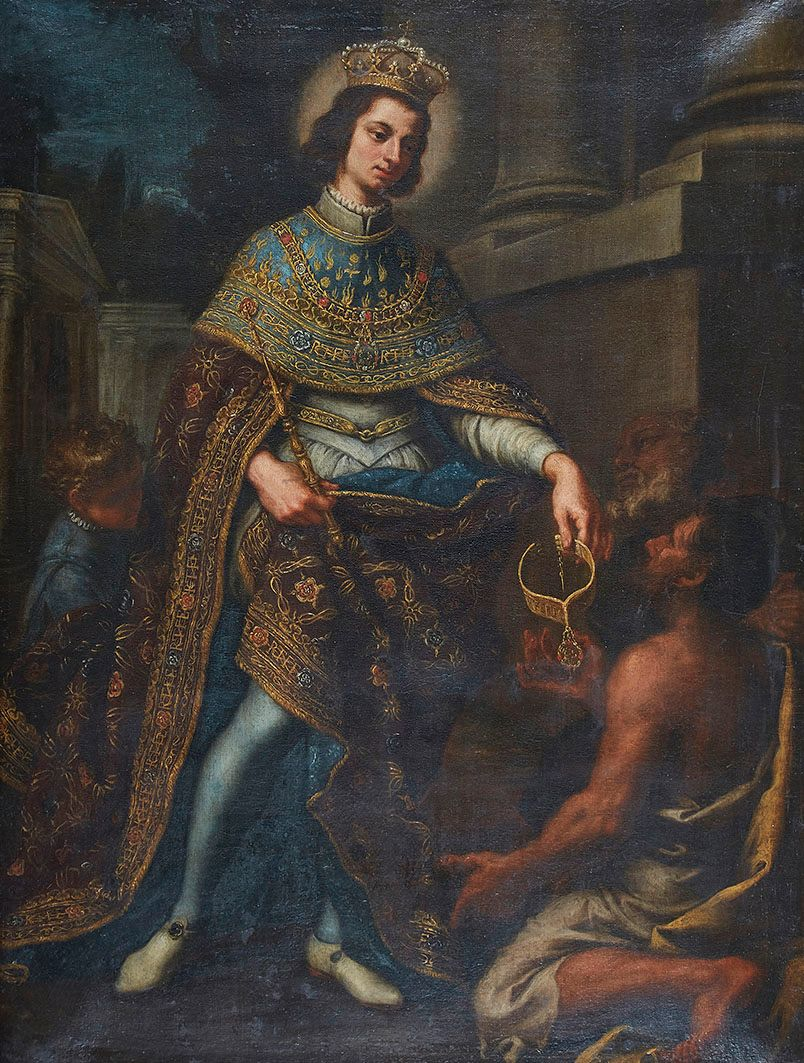
Order of the Most Holy Annunciation (1362)

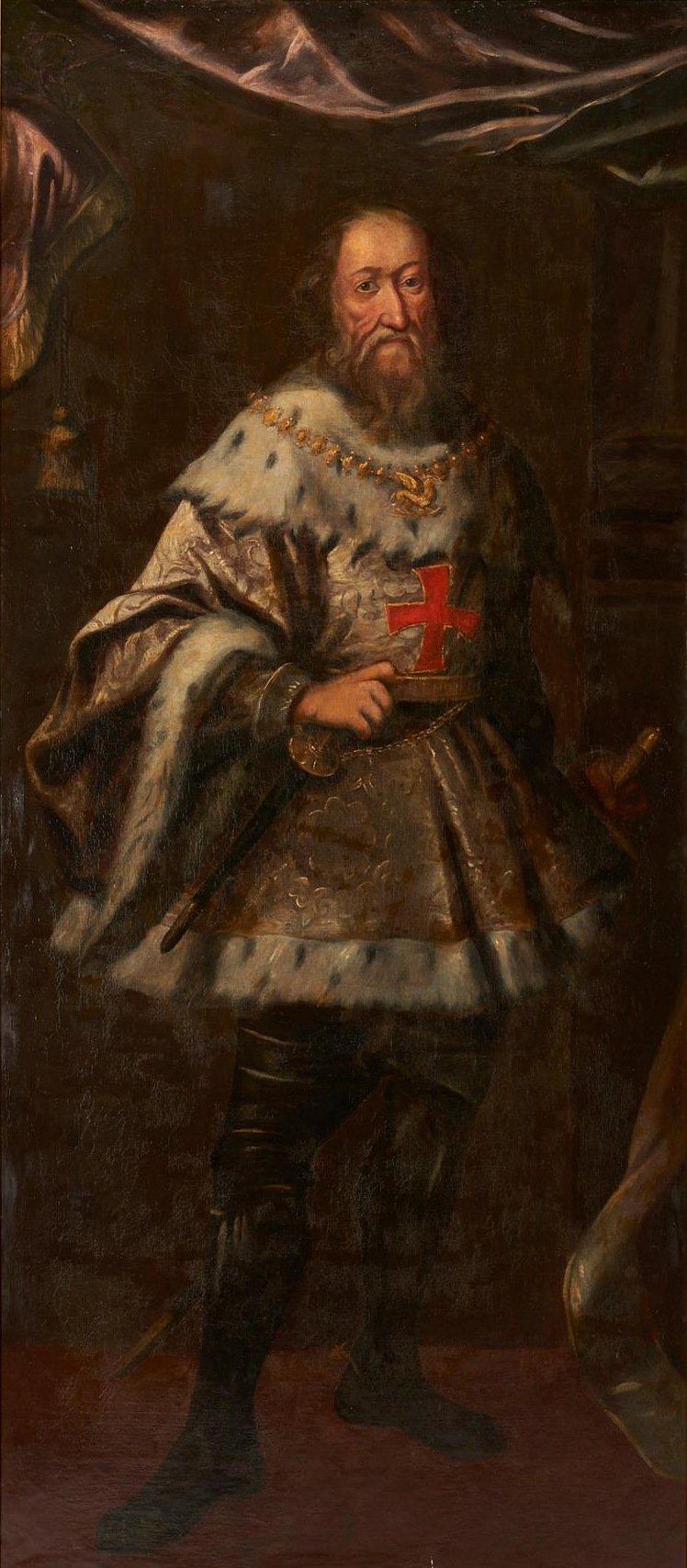
Order of the Dragon (1408)

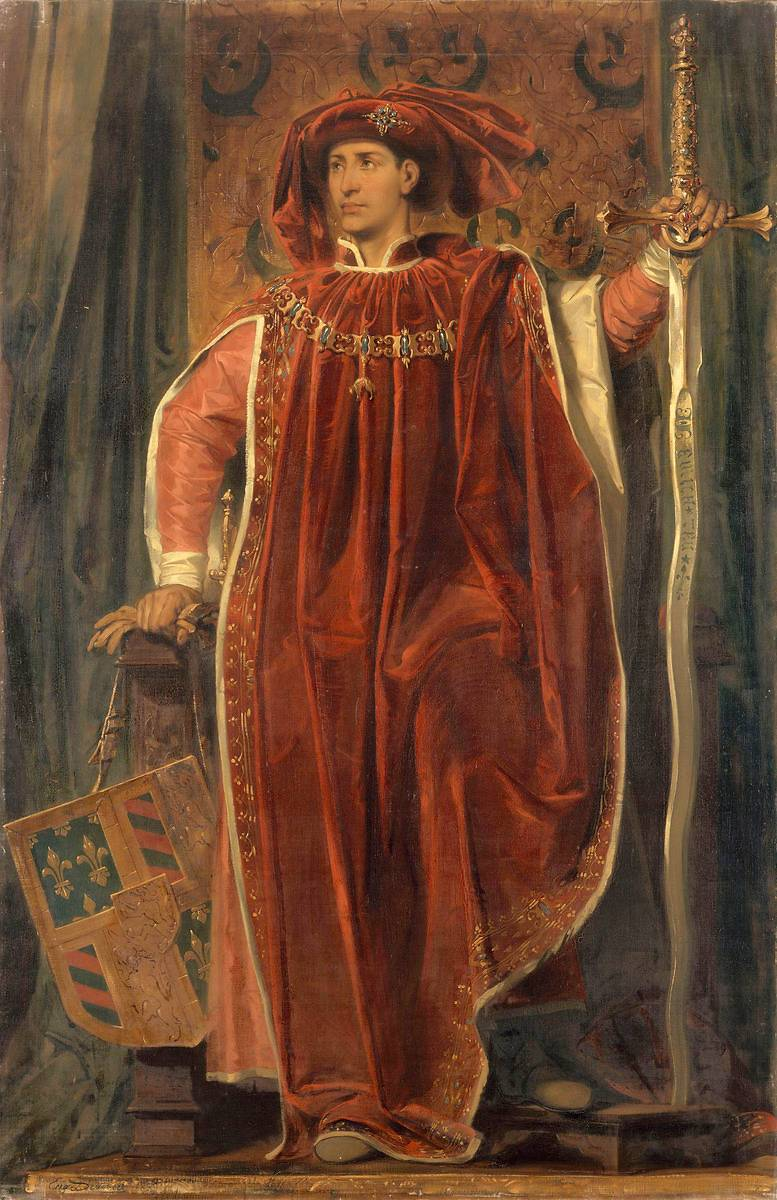
Order of the Golden Fleece (1430)

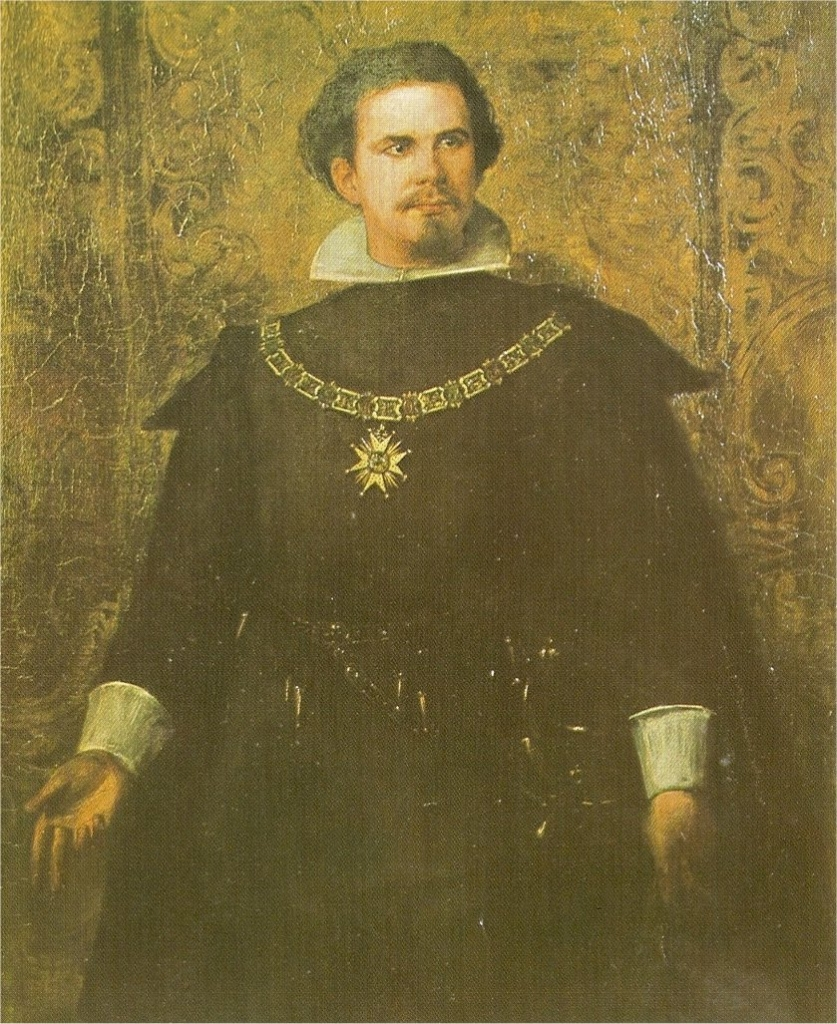
Order of Saint Hubert (1444)

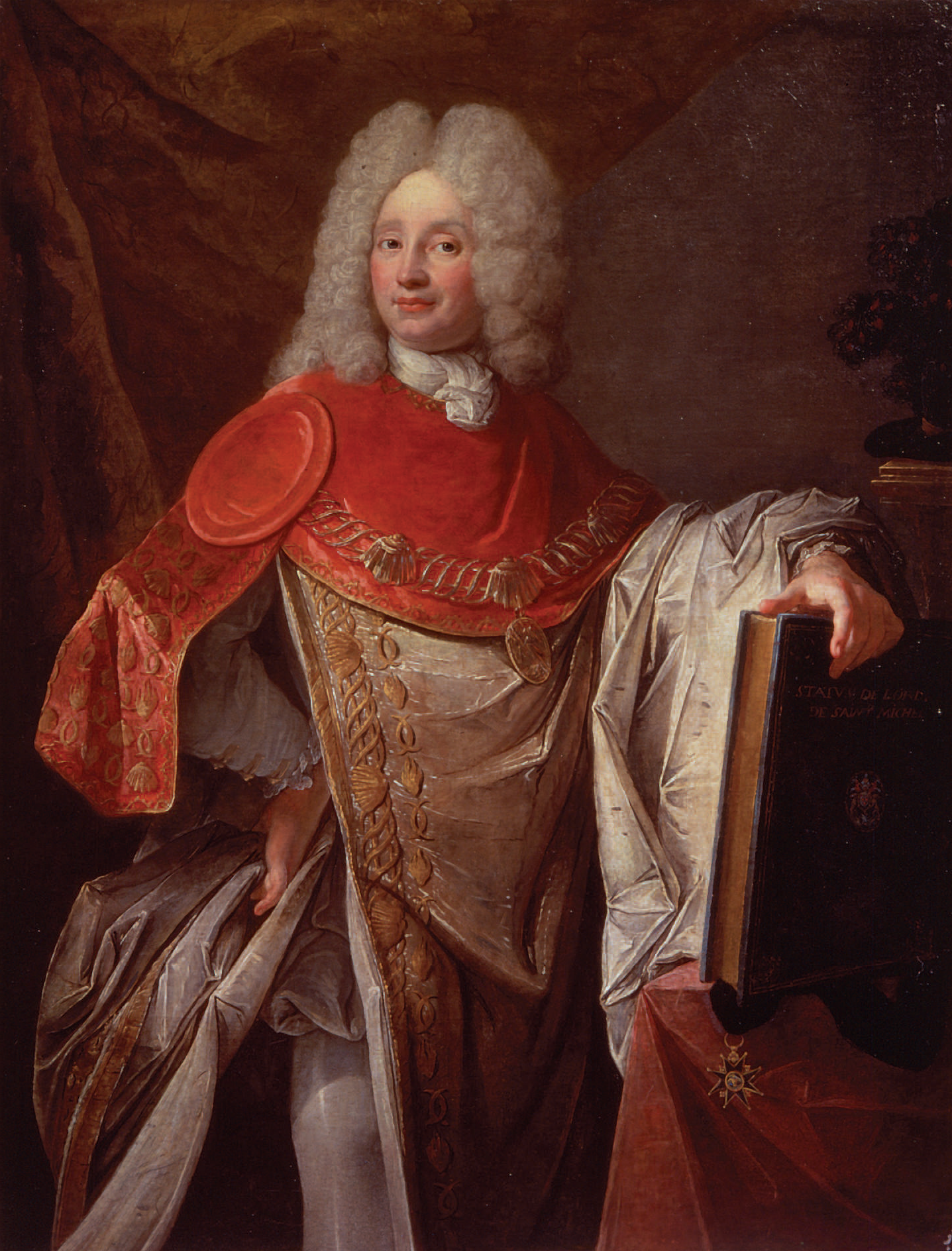
Order of Saint Michael (1469)

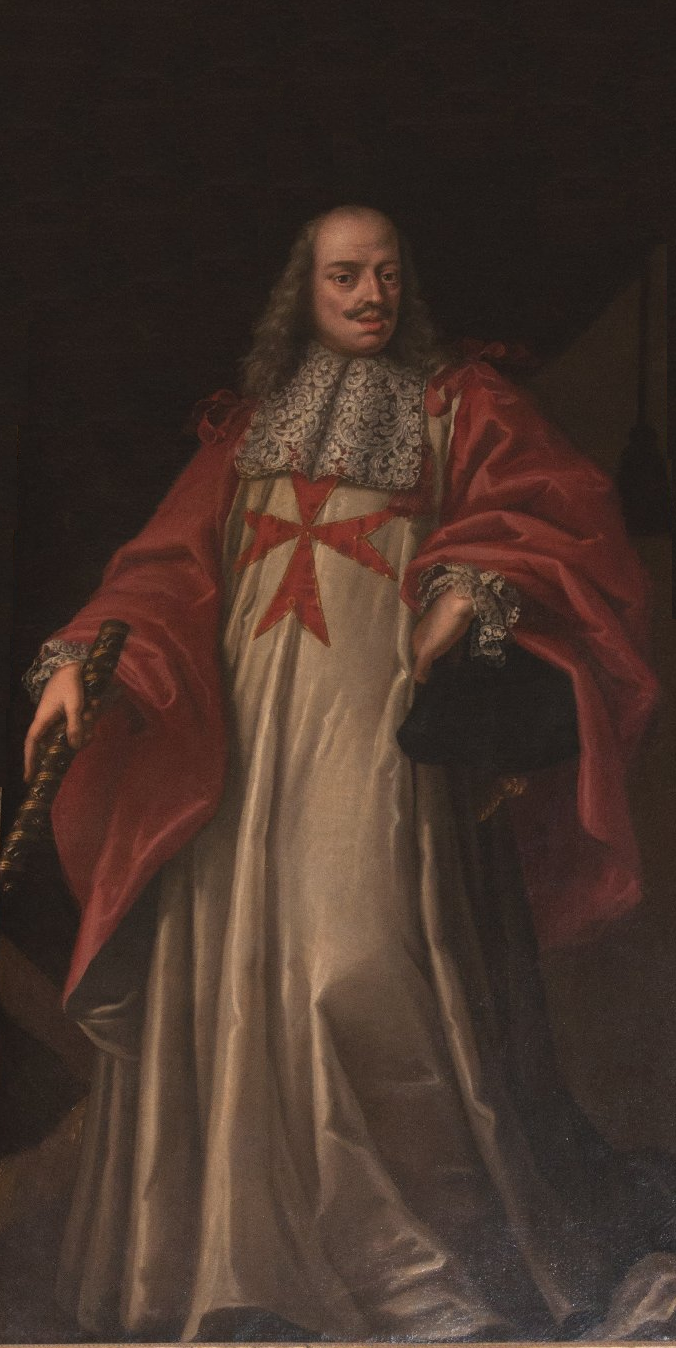
Order of Saint Stephen (1561)

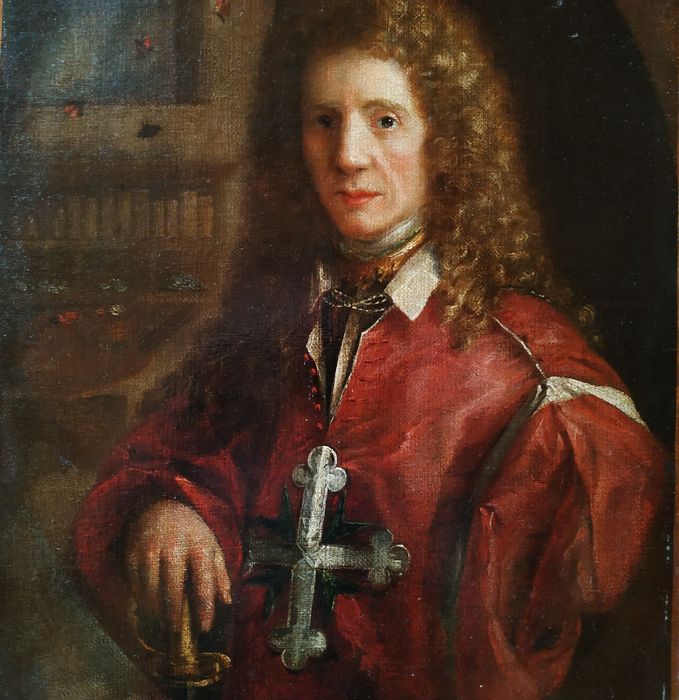
Order of Saints Maurice and Lazarus (1572)

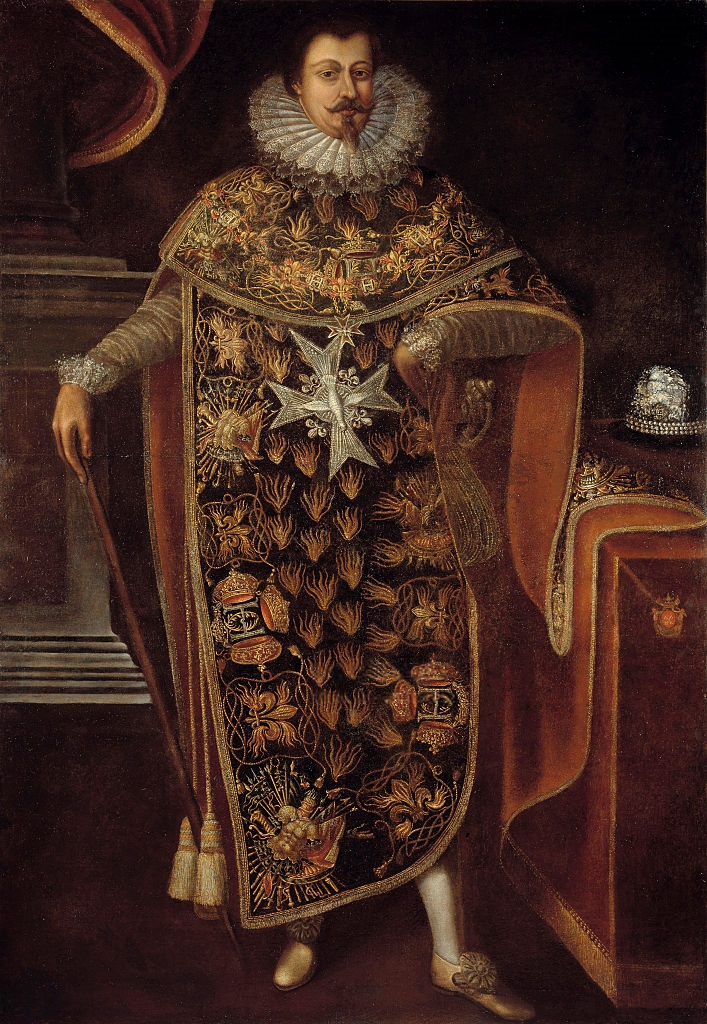
Order of the Holy Spirit (1578)

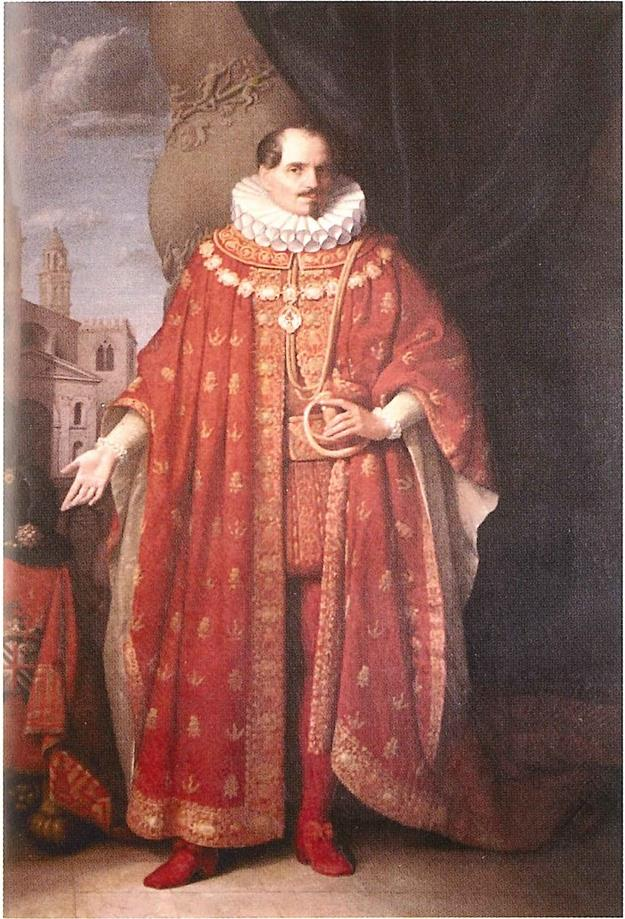
Order of the Redeemer (1608)

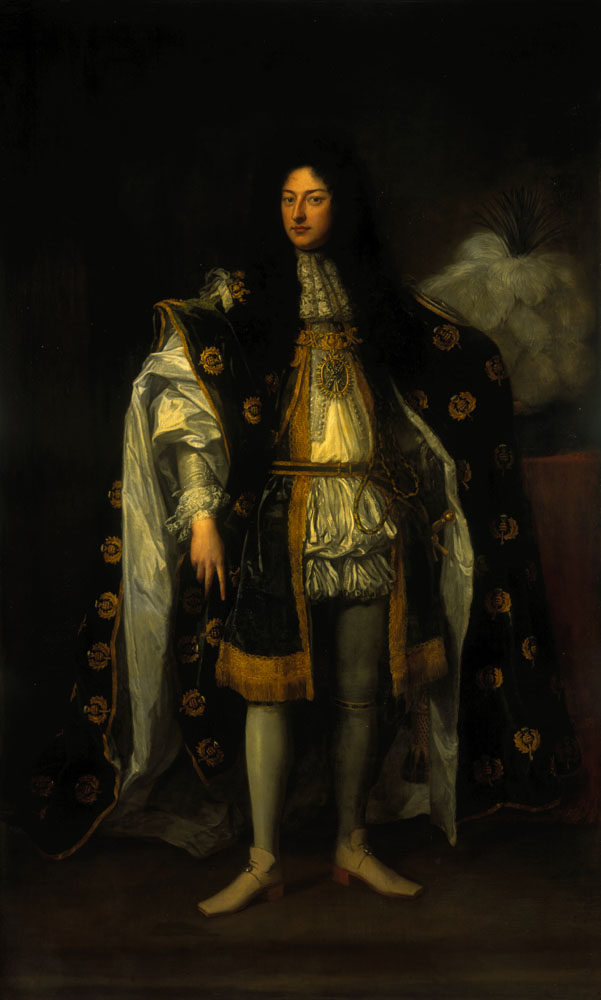
Order of the Thistle (1687)

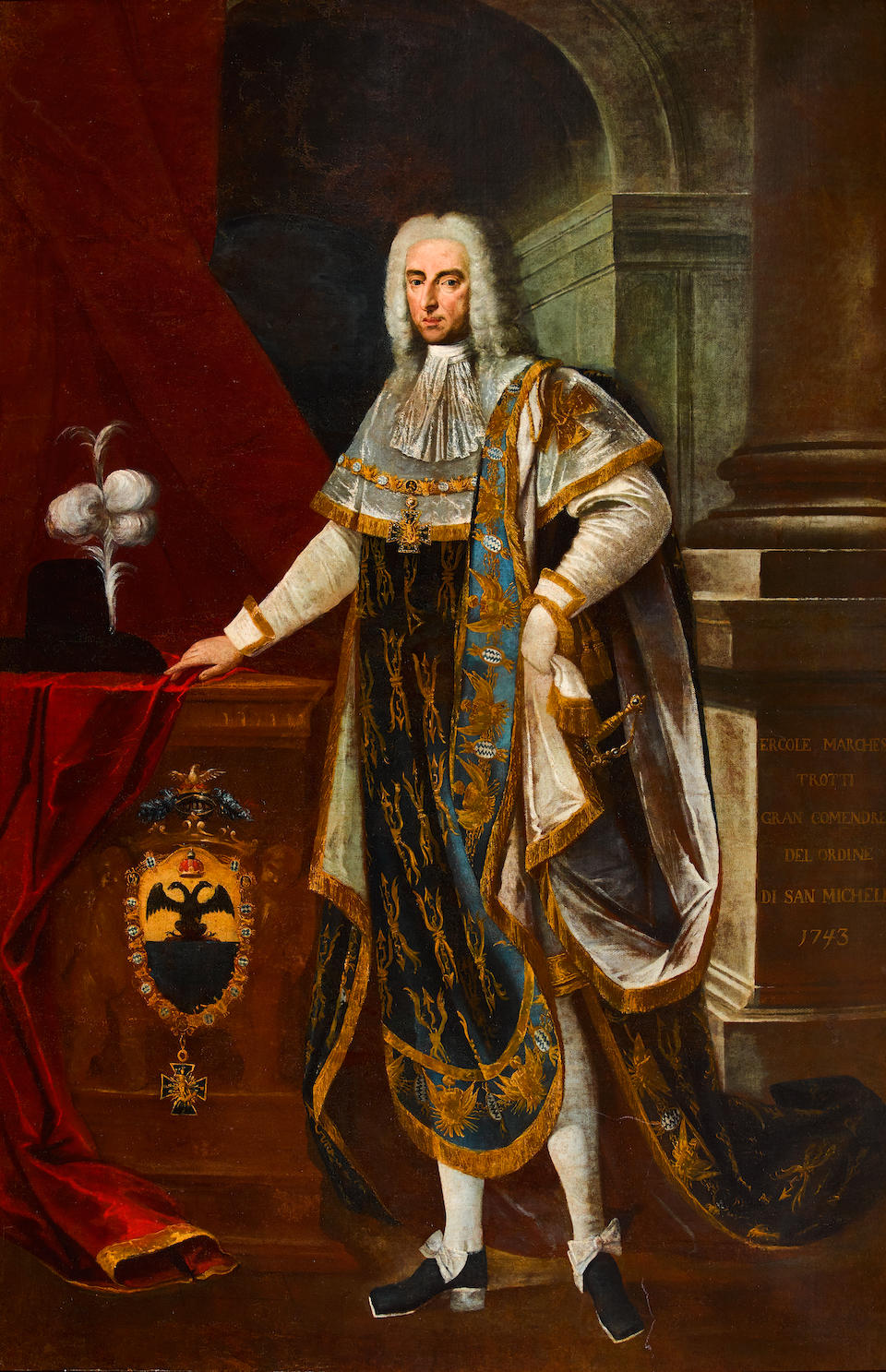
Order of Saint Michael (Bavaria) (1693)

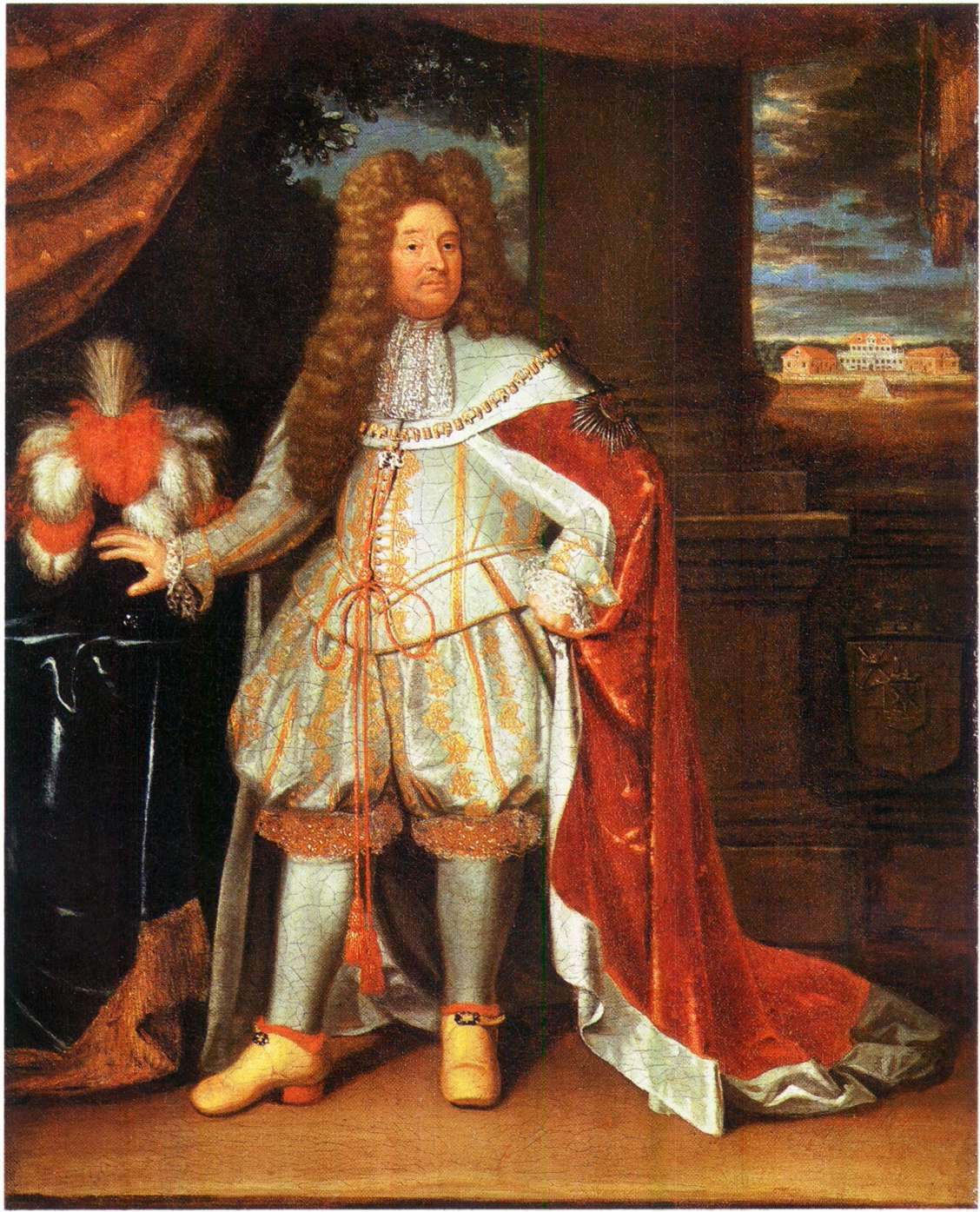
Order of the Elephant (1693)

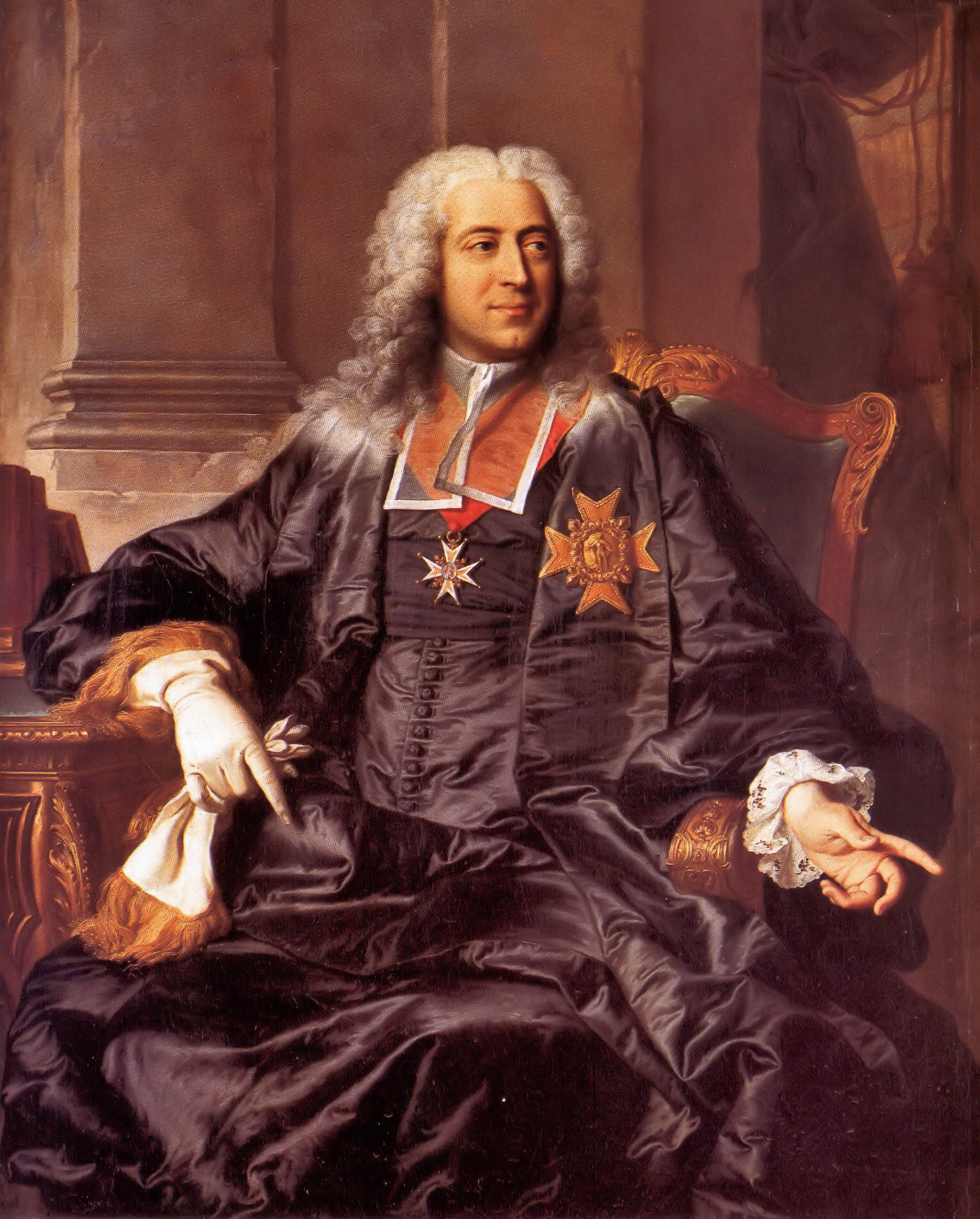
Order of Saint Louis (1694)

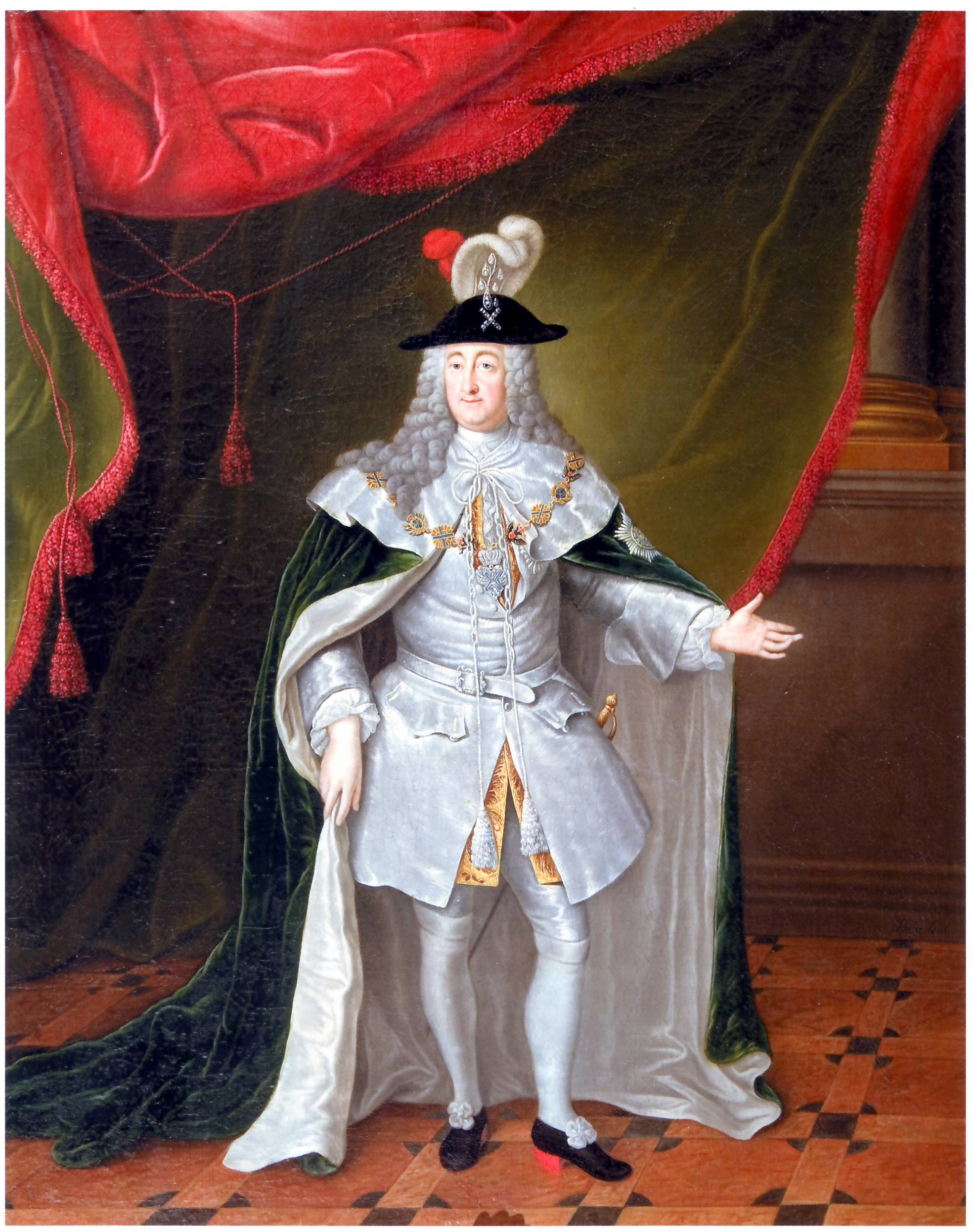
Order of St. Andrew (1698)

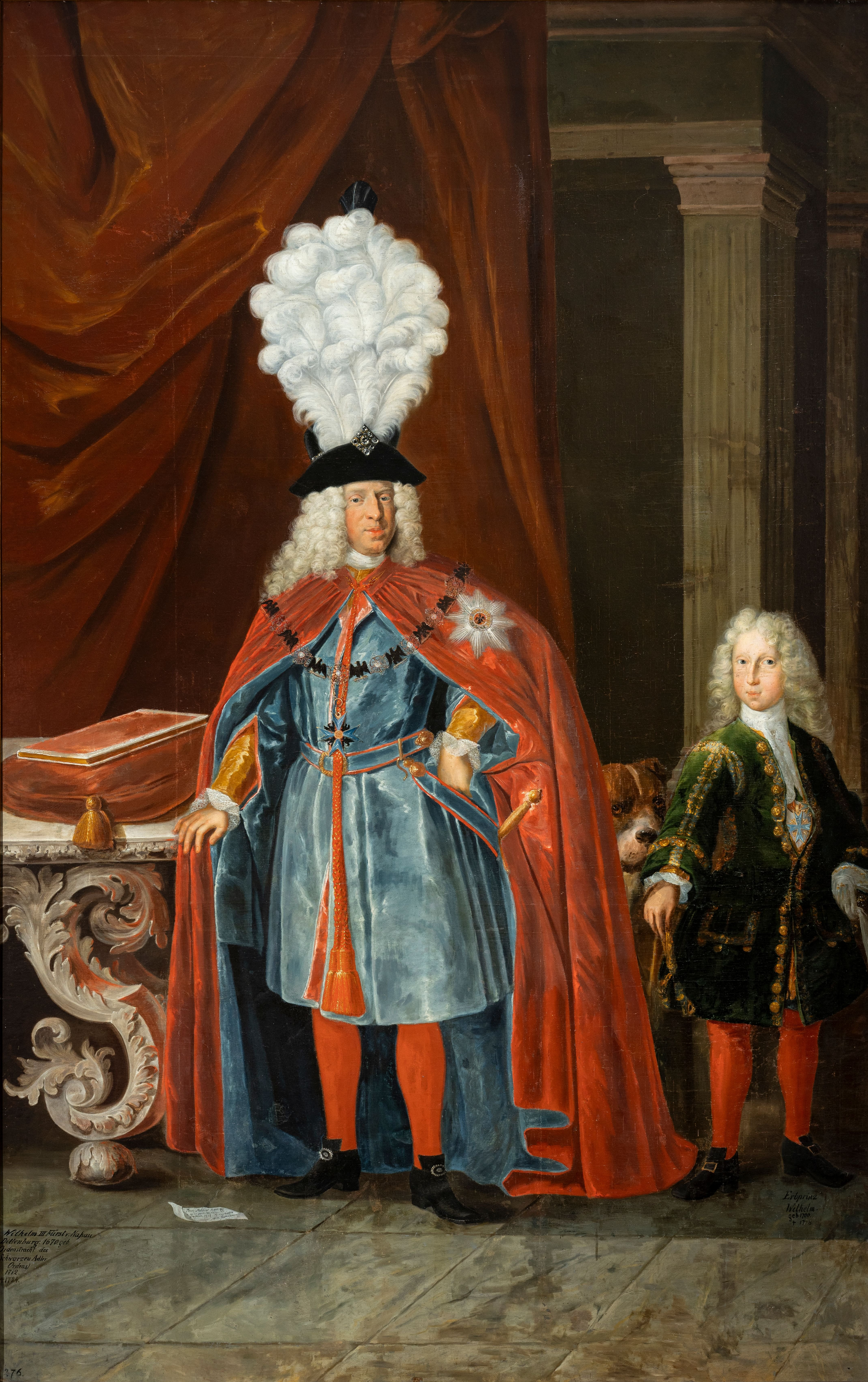
Order of the Black Eagle (1701)

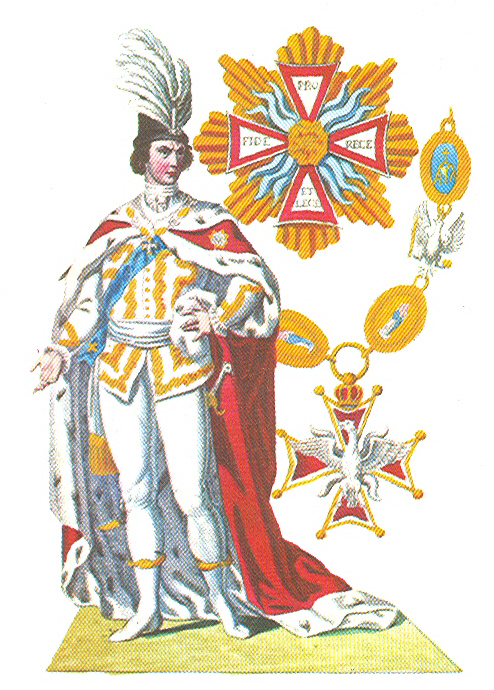
Order of the White Eagle (1705)

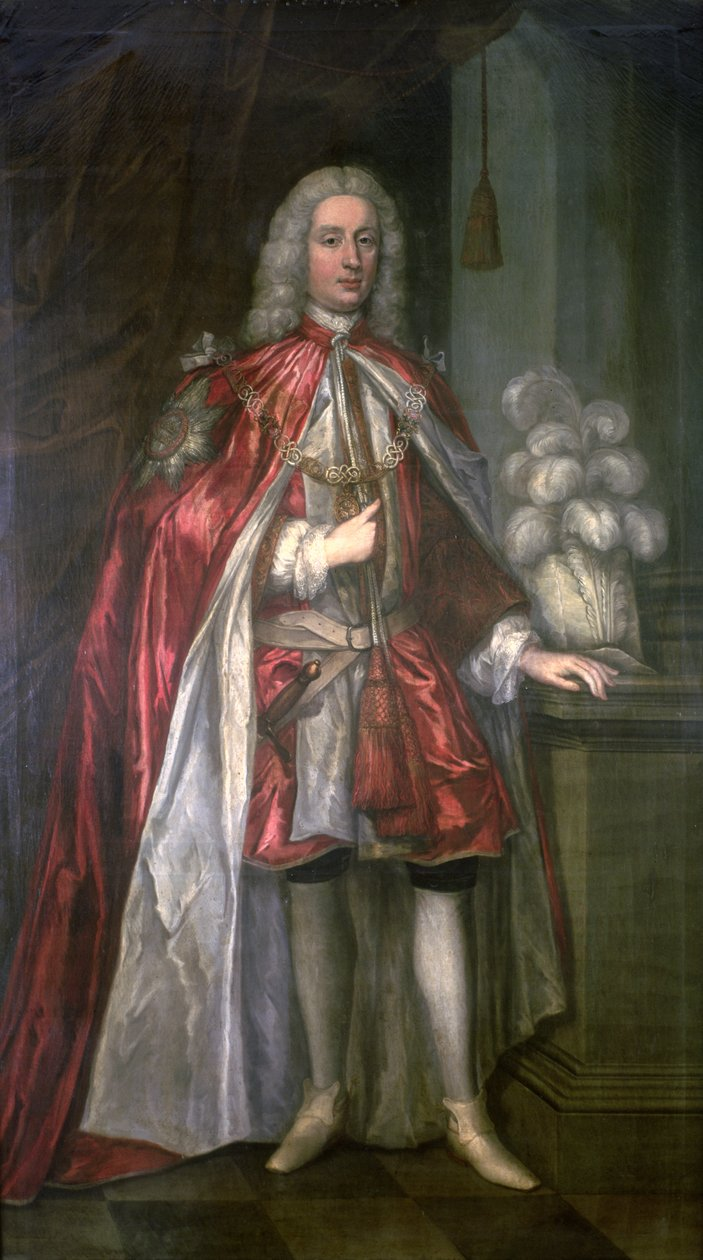
Order of the Bath (1725)

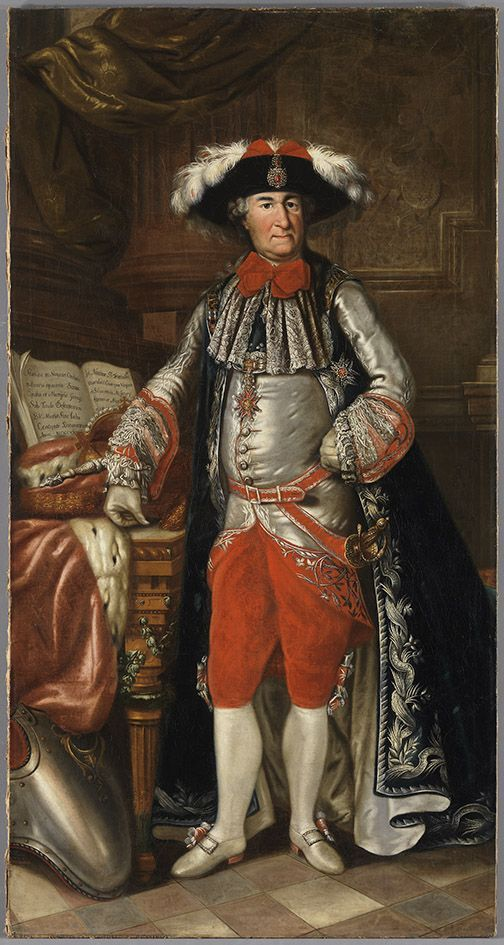
Order of Saint George (Bavaria) (1726)

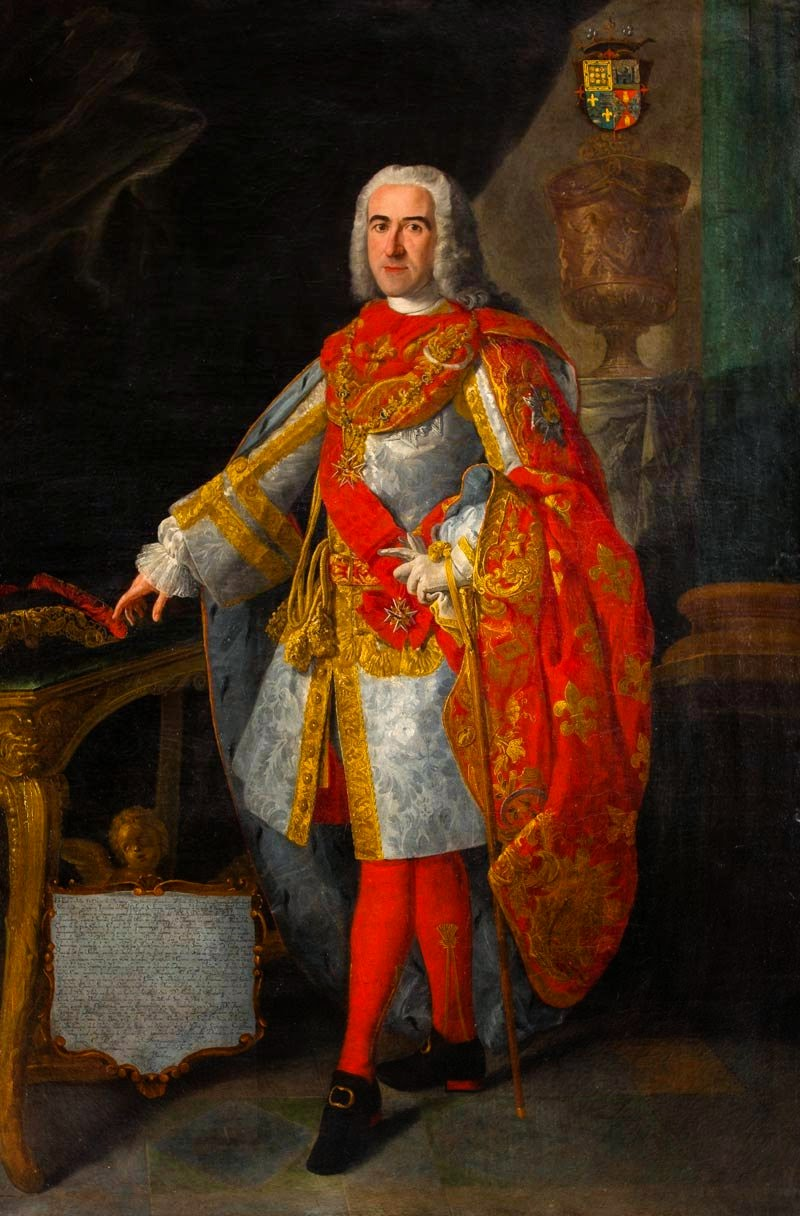
Order of Saint Januarius (1738)

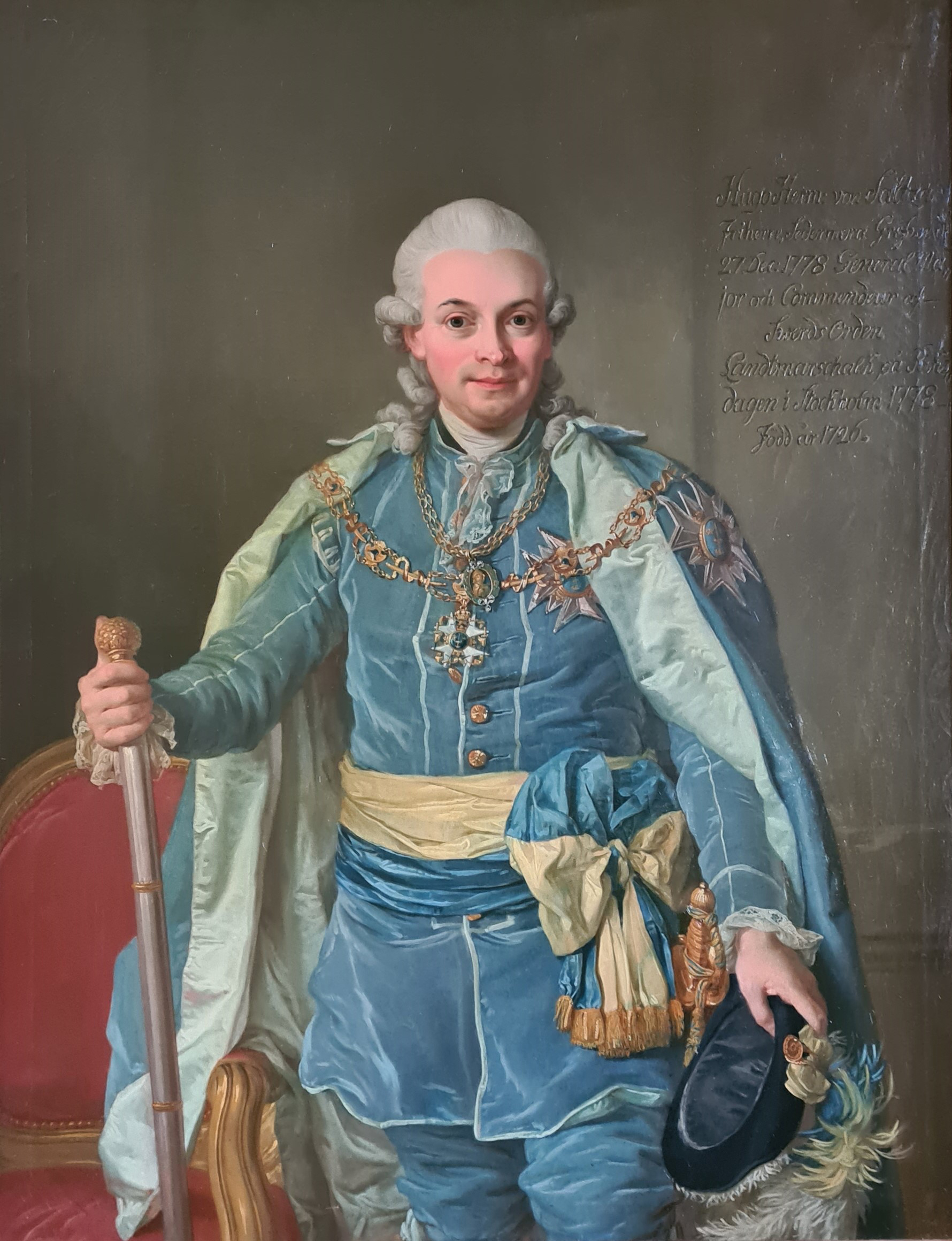
Order of the Sword (1748)

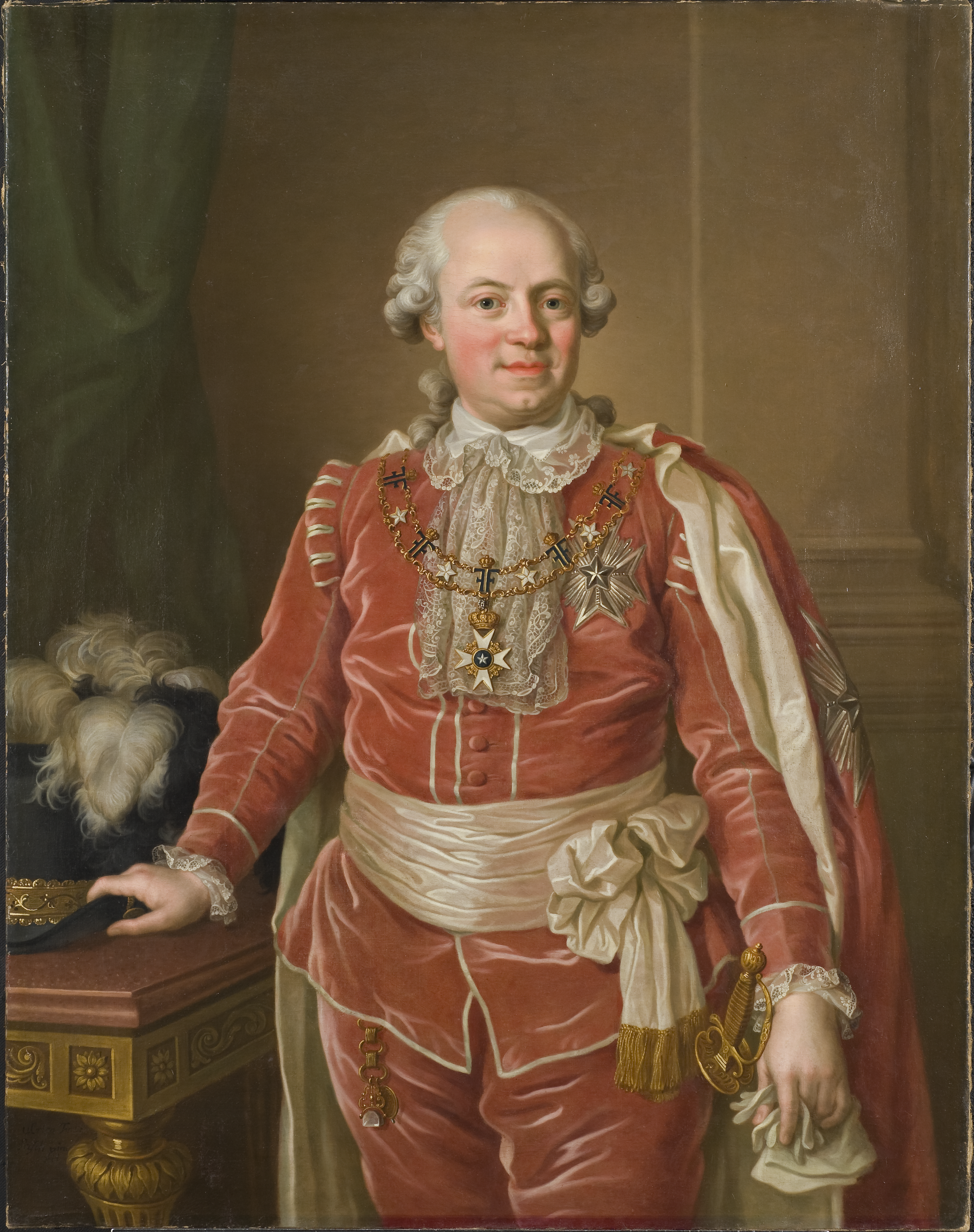
Order of the Polar Star (1748)

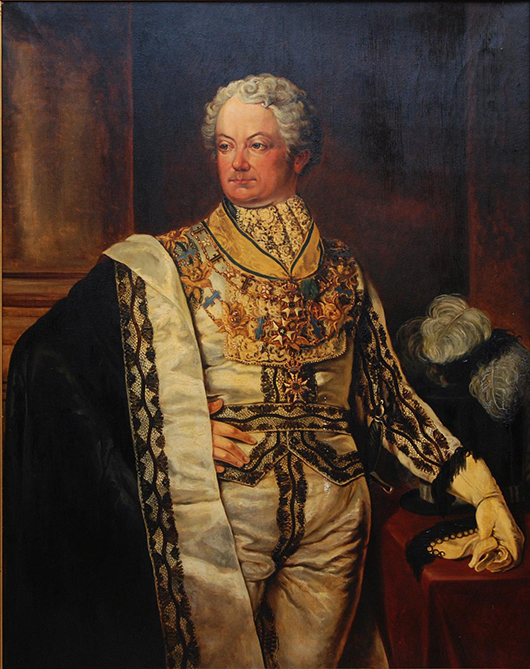
Order of the Seraphim (1748)

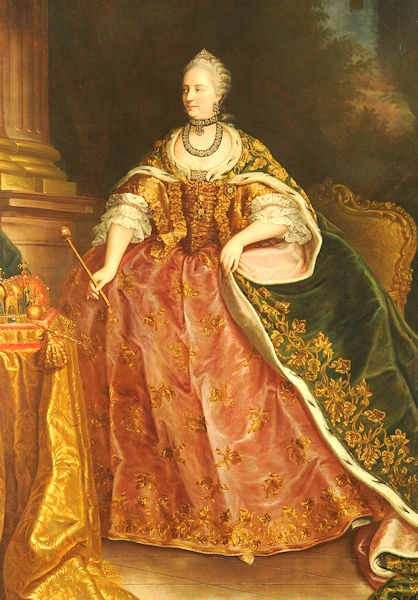
Order of Saint Stephen of Hungary (1764)

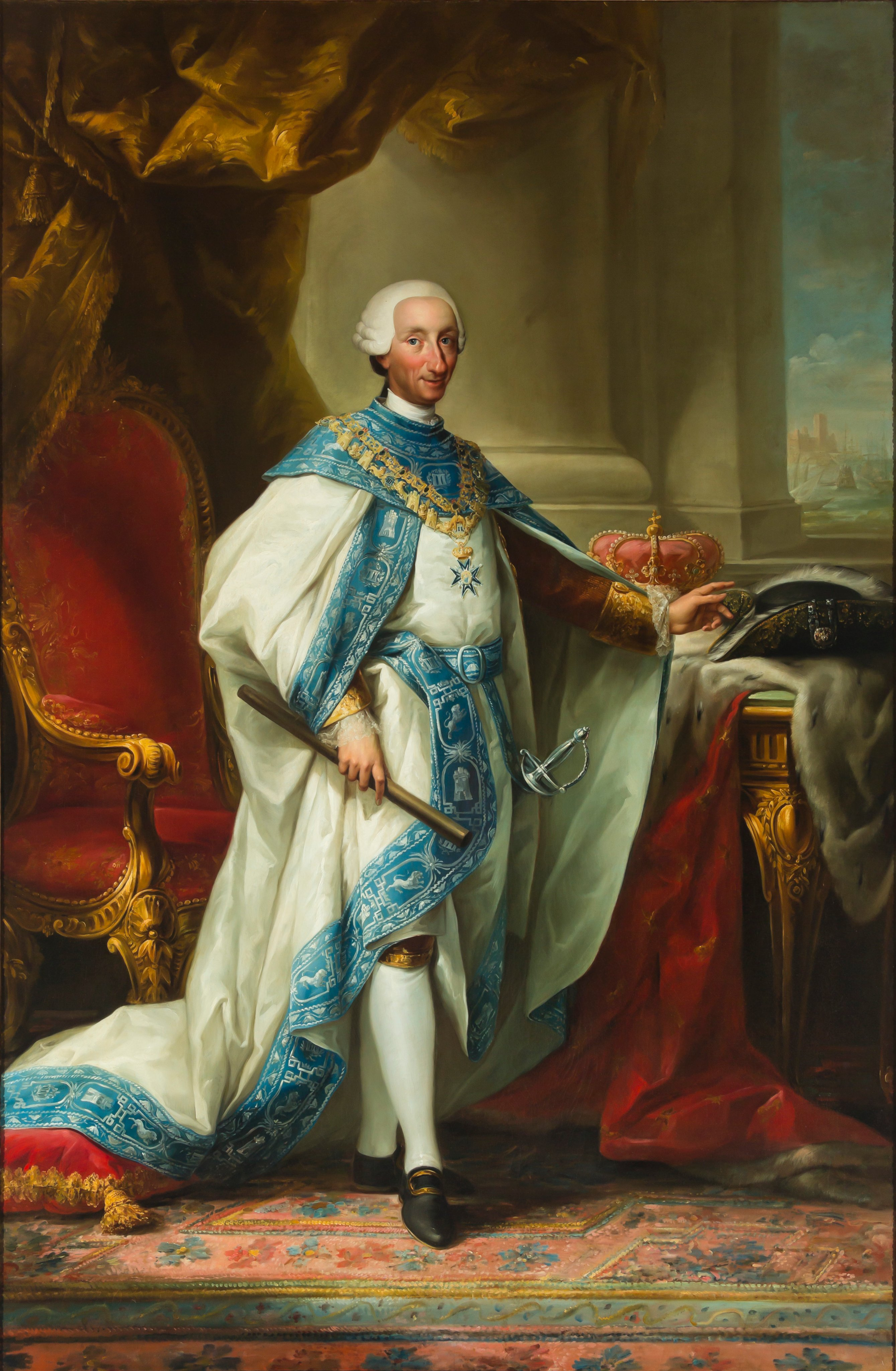
Order of Charles III (1771)

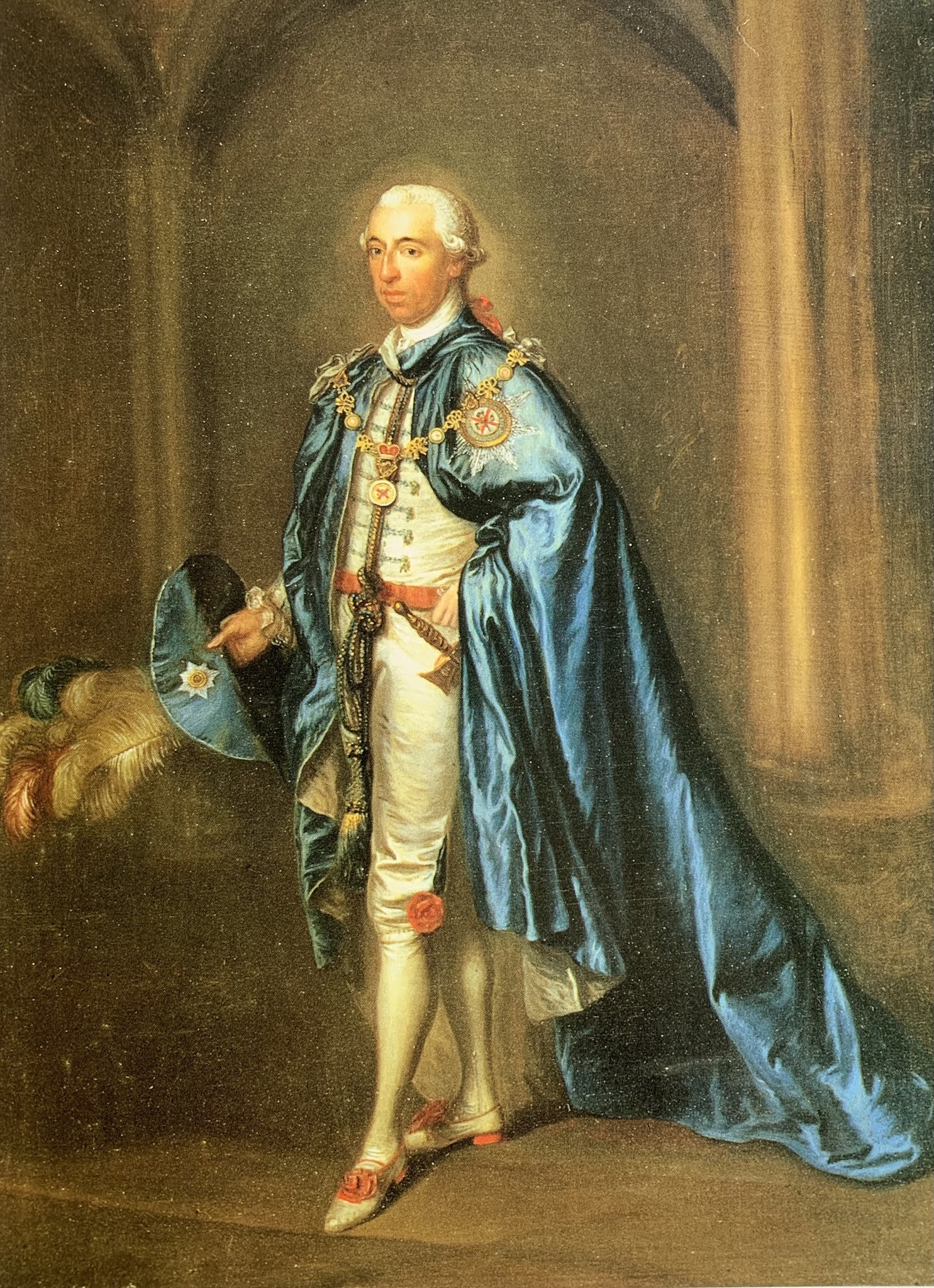
Order of St. Patrick (1783)

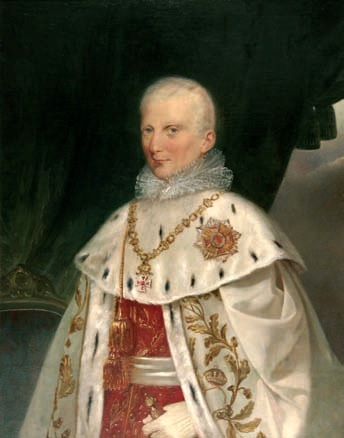
Order of Leopold (1808)

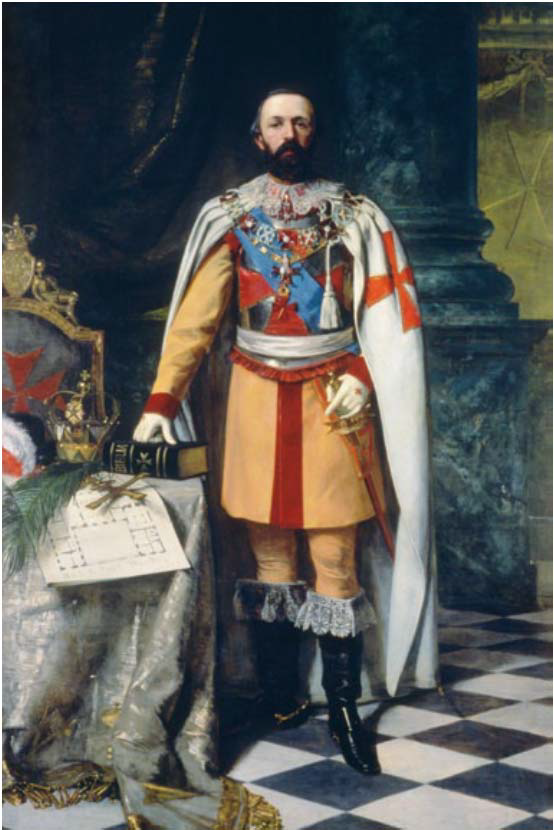
Order of Charles XIII (1811)

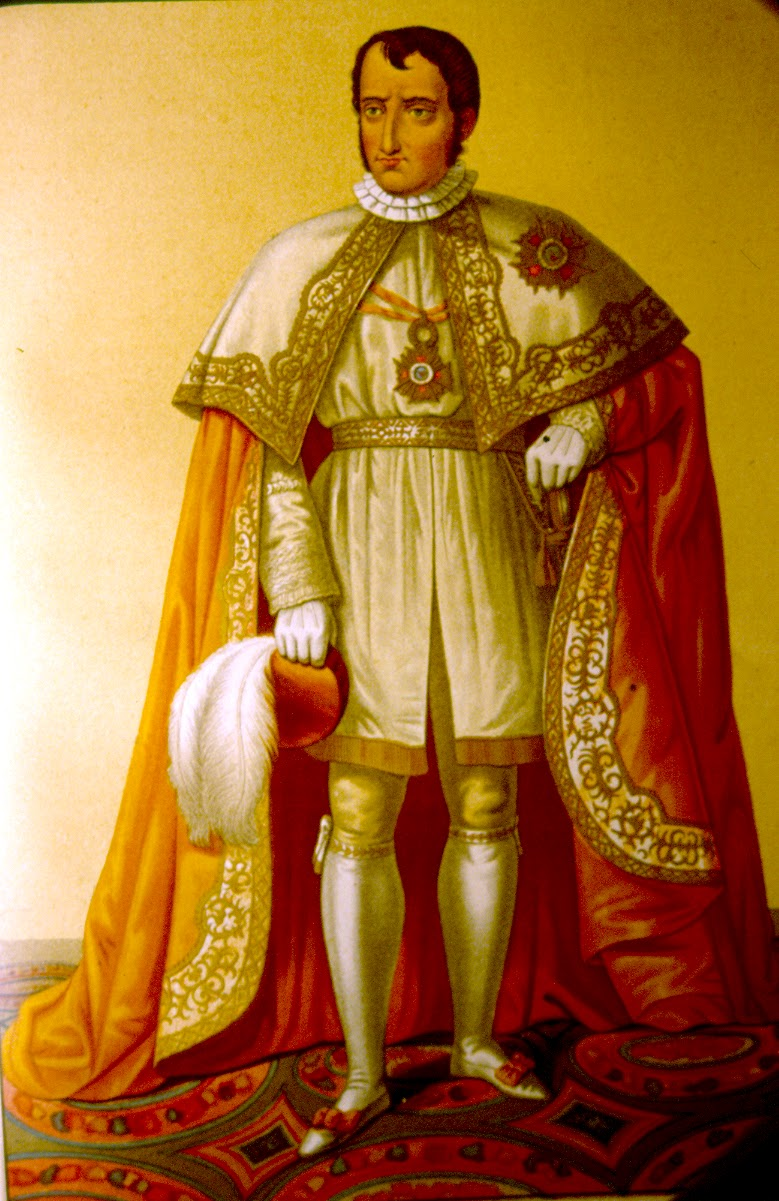
Order of Isabella the Catholic (1815)

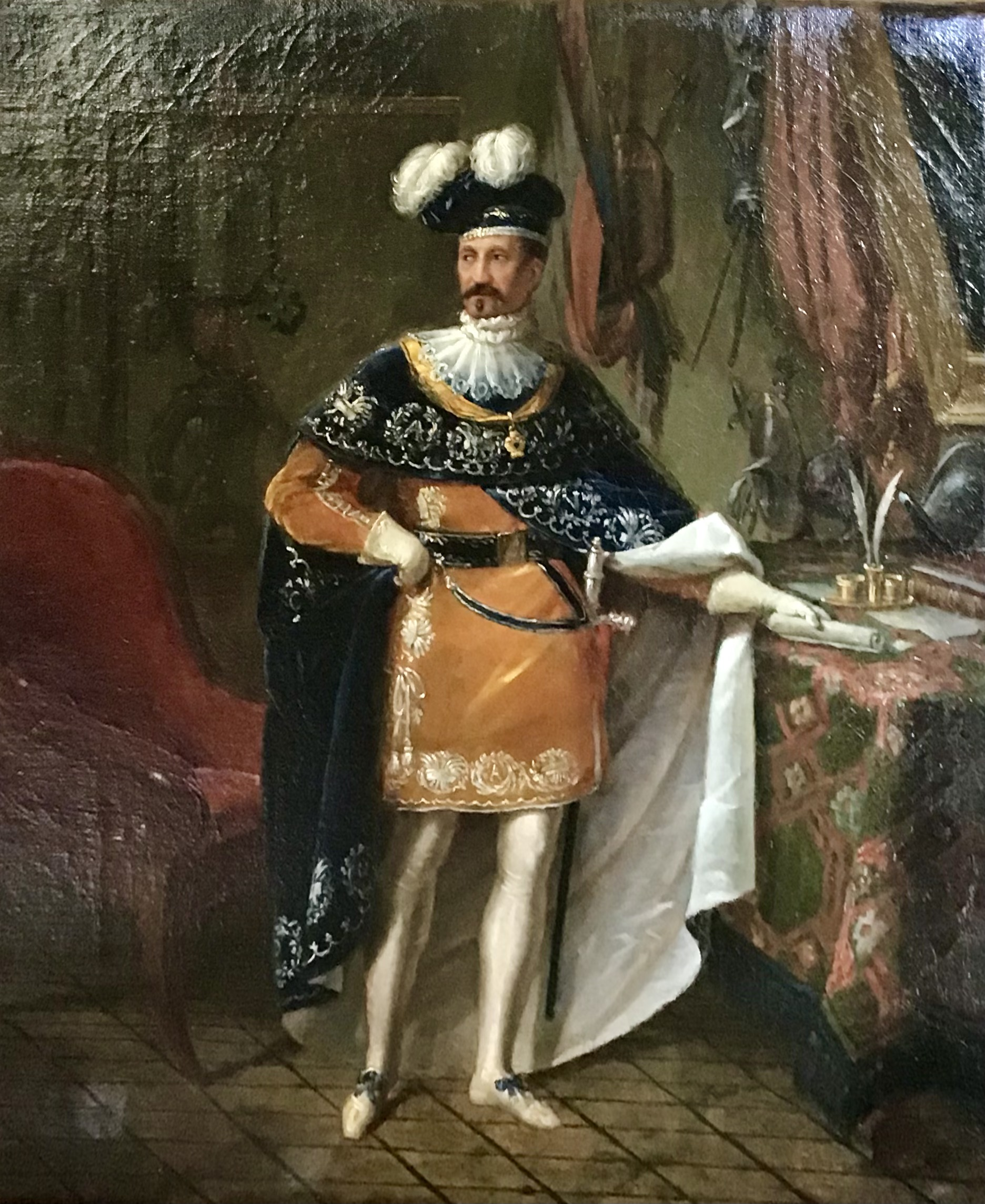
Order of the Iron Crown (1816)

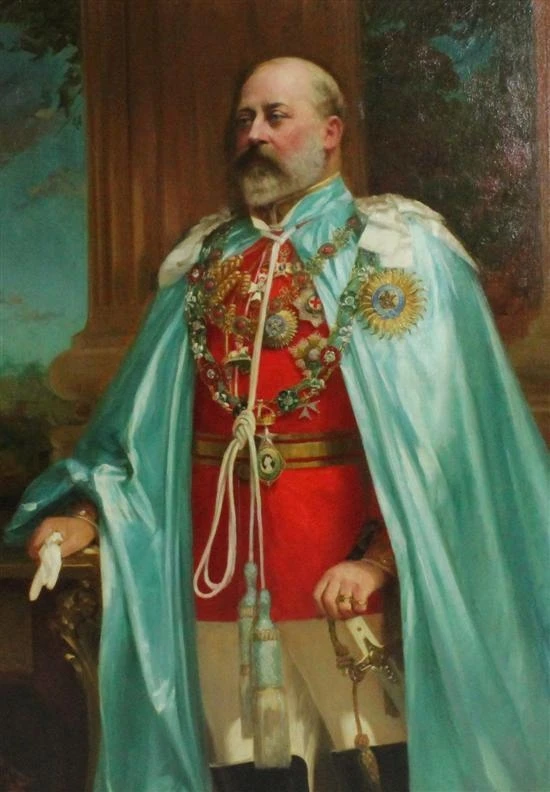
Order of the Star of India (1861)

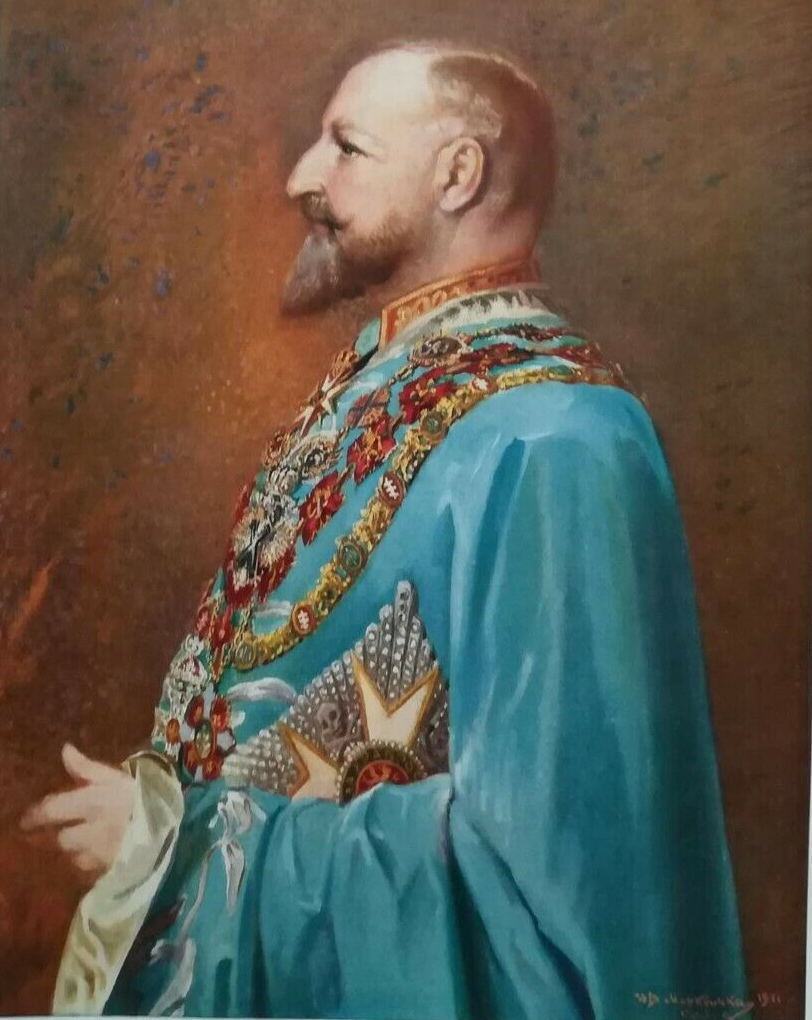
Order of Bravery (1880)

== See also ==
- Military order (society)
- Order (honour)
- Title of honor
- Self-styled orders

== Bibliography ==
- Anstis, John (1752). Observations introductory to an historical essay upon the Knighthood of the Bath. London: James Woodman.
- Burke, John (1725). Statutes of the Most Honourable Order of the Bath.
- D'Arcy Jonathan Dacre Boulton (2000) [February 1987]. The knights of the crown: the monarchical orders of knighthood in later medieval Europe. Woodbridge, Suffolk: Boydell Press, Palgrave Macmillan. pp. 1325–1520. ISBN 0-312-45842-8.
- Kaeuper, Richard W.; Kennedy, Elspeth; De Charny, Geoffroi (December 1996). The Book of Chivalry of Geoffroi De Charny: Text, Context, and Translation. University of Pennsylvania Press. ISBN 0-8122-1579-6.
- Risk, James C. (1972). The History of the Order of the Bath and its Insignia. London: Spink & Son.
