= D'Arcy Boulton =

D'Arcy Boulton may refer to:

- G. D'Arcy Boulton (1759–1834), lawyer, judge and political figure in Upper Canada
- D'Arcy Boulton (Ontario politician) (1825–1875), grandson of the above; Canadian lawyer, politician and Orangeman
- D'Arcy Boulton (heraldist) (born 1946), Canadian heraldist
