= Montage =

Montage may refer to:

== Arts and entertainment ==
=== Filmmaking and films ===
- Montage (filmmaking), a technique in film editing
- Montage (2013 film), a South Korean film

=== Music ===
- Montage (music), or sound collage
- Montage (EP), a 2017 EP by Block B
- Montage (Charlene Choi album), 2012
- Montage (Kenny G album), 1990
- Montage (Savoy Records album), 1955
- Montage (Yen Town Band album), 1996
- Montage (Yulia album), 2006
- Montage, an album by Kahimi Karie, 2004
- Montage Music Group, a former American independent record label

=== Other arts and entertainment ===
- Photomontage, the process and result of making a composite photograph
- Montage (TV series), a filmed history of the 1960s and 1970s

== Businesses ==
- Montage Hotels & Resorts, a luxury hotel and resort management company
- Le Bistro Montage, or simply Montage, a restaurant in Portland, Oregon, U.S.

== Software ==
- Montage (image software), used in astrophotography to assemble astronomical images
- Montage (screenwriting software)

== Other uses ==
- Manta Montage, a car
- Montage tower, CityPlace, Toronto, Canada
- The Montage Reno, Nevada, U.S., a high-rise residential building in Reno, Nevada
- Montage Mountain, Pennsylvania, U.S. - see Montage Mountain Ski Resort
- Le Montage, a 1982 novel by Vladimir Volkoff, published in English as The Set-Up
