= Noble Order of Saint George of Rougemont =

Order of chivalry in the Free County of Burgundy

The Noble Order of Saint George of Rougemont was a baronial order of chivalry established around 1440 in the Free County of Burgundy. From the 15th through the late 18th centuries it enjoyed the protection of the Dukes of Burgundy and later the French kings. It was abolished in the wake of the French Revolution and became extinct after the death of the last knight in 1869.

The order has been revived at least twice in the 20th and 21st centuries.

== Origin (1440) ==
The noble Brotherhood of Saint George was created around 1300 by the rulers of the Free County of Burgundy in order to assemble Burgundian nobles of chivalric lineage. Its insignia was a medal of St. George on horseback slaying a dragon. This order was destroyed by wars and lapsed by the end of the 14th century.

The order was restored as a baronial confraternity around 1390 or 1440 by Philibert de Mollans, squire to the Duke of Burgundy. According to tradition, he had made a pilgrimage to the Holy Land and brought back a relic of Saint George. The statutes of the order are known: members were required to prove 16 quarters of nobility and 10 degrees of nobility in the male line, birth in Franche-Comté, and Catholic religion. They had to be 16 years of age and donate 300 livres. A governor general was elected for life by the knights. Other officers included a chancellor, a treasurer and two secretaries. Assemblies were held every year on 22 April, the eve of Saint George.

Unlike military orders and royal orders such as the Order of Saint Michael, which were directly attached to a monarch, the Noble Order of Saint George of Rougemont was a rare example of a voluntary confraternity of gentlemen in a province of the Ancien Régime.

== Equestrian order (1485) ==
Philip the Good allowed the order to wear the medal of St. George from a red ribbon identical to that of the Order of the Golden Fleece. In 1485, at the request of Philip the Good, the order was made into an equestrian order, approved by Pope Innocent VIII. In 1648, the confraternity moved to the free imperial city of Besançon and took a political position in opposition to the Parlement in Dôle, then the capital of Burgundy.

In 1661, the confraternity decided to meet at the convent of the Grands Carmes (Besançon) founded by a fellow member, Jean de Vienne. After the French conquest in 1668 and the annexation of the Franché-Comte to France, with the Treaty of Nijmegen in 1678, Louis XIV decided to tolerate the confraternity, despite their resistance to the French invaders. The king authorized the knights to wear their medal of St. George suspended this time from a blue moiré ribbon, identical to that of the Order of the Holy Spirit; this was in order to obtain the support of the local nobility, who provided him with officers for his army.

Louis XV and Louis XVI continued this policy and presented the confraternity with their own portraits with the legend "Given by the King to the Knights of Saint-George". The portraits decorated the great hall of the convent of the Grands Carmes, together with the portrait of the Prince of Condé, protector of the order, until the hall was destroyed during the French Revolution.

The coat of arms were registered in 1696 and in 1768 new statutes were written.

== From the French Revolution to abolition (1824) ==
Most of the members were killed during the revolution and the Napoleonic Wars. There were only 25 members left in 1814. In 1816, at the end of the war, the survivors gathered under the leadership of a colonel of the dragoons, Charles-Emmanuel, marquis of Saint-Mauris (1735–1839), baron de Chatenois et de la Villeneuve, comte de Saulx et Genevrey, then Maréchal of the camps and armies of the king and inspector general of the national guard.

The 1768 statutes were revised and new knights were made for a total of 78 in 1817, the year of the last dubbing ceremony. But the order was abolished in 1824 by a decree from the king that forbade the wearing of insignia other than those of royal orders. The last knight was the marquis Jouffroy d'Alban who died in 1869, at which time the order became extinct.

== Revivals ==
The order was revived in the 1920s, when it was headed by several individuals with reputedly false claims to titles of nobility. Among its members were said to be a number of French, Italian, and American generals and admirals, as well as German and Italian archdukes, the presidents of several South American countries, and a justice of the New York Supreme Court. Nothing further is known of this revival after 1936, when one of its members was fined for wearing false orders and impersonating a general. Nevertheless, the order was included in a list of false orders by the Holy See in 1953.
