= Montage (Charlene Choi album) =

Studio album by Charlene Choi
- Released: July 2012
- Recorded: 2011–2012
- Genre: Cantopop
- Label: Emperor Entertainment Group

Charlene Choi chronology
Sweetest Day (2011)	Montage (2012)	Blooming (2013)

Montage is the second studio album by Hong Kong singer Charlene Choi. It was released on July 24, 2012.

== Background ==
Montage was recorded since 2011 to mid-2012 and finally released on July 24. It contains re-release of her 2008 single "2 - 1".

== Release ==
- July 24, 2012 (Standard Edition) (Cantonese and Mandarin Edition)
- July 31, 2012 (Regular Edition CD/DVD)

== Track listing ==
1. "2 - 1"
2. "Ming Ming"
3. "Rilakkuma"
4. "Grow Old Together"
5. "Hopefully Tomorrow a Wake Up Doomsday"
6. "Vanuat"
7. "Species Me"
8. "Dog Grace Song"
9. "Train Through the Mountain"
10. "Leftover Ladies Afraid Combat"

DVD (Regular Edition)

1. "Ming Ming" (music video)
2. "Grow Old Together" (music video)

Mandarin Edition

1. "Two Minus One"
2. "Obviously"
3. "Relaxed Bear"
4. "Until the Death Do Us Part"
5. "Hopefully Tomorrow a Wake Up Doomsday"
6. "Vanuatu"
7. "Grow Me"
8. "Ode to Dogs"
9. "Train Passes Through the Tunnel"
10. "Bachelorettes Fear Combat"
