= Collange =

Collange is a French surname. Notable people with the surname include:

- Christiane Collange (1930–2023), French journalist and author
- Jean-François Collange (born 1944), French Lutheran pastor and professor of theology

== See also ==
- Collanges, a commune in the French Puy-de-Dôme department
