= College Township (disambiguation) =

The "College Township" was an area of land in Ohio in which Miami University was built.

College Township may also refer to:

- College Township, Ohio
- College Township, Pennsylvania
