= College (corporation) =

A college is a variety of the corporation, literally a "body" (Latin: corpus, corporis) created by a legal fiction with its own legal personality, able to act largely as a natural person as regards the law of contract. Thus it can enter into contracts for sale, purchase and employment and can sue and be sued in a court of law, and can own real estate.

== Etymology ==
The word "college" is contracted from the Latin compound word cum-lego, from the verb lego, legere, legi, lectum, "to collect, gather together, pick", plus the preposition cum, "with", thus meaning "selected together". Thus "colleagues" are fellow members of a college, literally "persons who have been selected together". In ancient Rome a collegium was a "body, guild, corporation united in colleagueship; of magistrates, praetors, tribunes, priests, augurs; a political club or trade guild".

== Examples ==
=== Mediaeval ===
- Colleges of priests. In mediaeval England there were colleges of priests, for example in chantry chapels, which were financed by a trust fund, usually established by the will of the deceased, for the purpose of singing masses to speed the soul of the deceased through purgatory;

=== Modern survivals ===
The following are all groups of persons "selected in common" to perform a specified function and appointed by a monarch, founder or other person in authority:

- The Royal College of Surgeons in England, originally the "Guild of Surgeons Within the City of London";
- The College of Arms in the City of London, a body of heralds enforcing heraldic law;
- An electoral college, to elect representatives, etc.
- College of education, originally simply a body created for that purpose, for example Eton College was founded in 1440 by letters patent of King Henry VI for the constitution of a college of Fellows, priests, clerks, choristers, poor scholars, and old poor men, with one master or governor, whose duty it shall be to instruct these scholars and any others who may resort thither from any part of England in the knowledge of letters, and especially of grammar, without payment".
- College of Bishops, the body of all bishops of the Catholic Church;
- College of Cardinals, the body of all cardinals of the Catholic Church;

== See also ==
- College (canon law)
- Collegium
