= D'Arcy Boulton (heraldist) =

Canadian heraldic artist

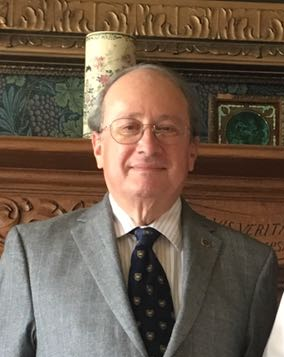
D'Arcy Boulton in 2017

D'Arcy Jonathan Dacre Boulton UE FRHSC AIH (born 1946) is a Canadian medieval historian, and heraldic author and artist. He is descendant of Boulton family of Toronto.

== Education and career ==
Having obtained a Bachelor of Arts degree from the University of Trinity College (1969) and a Master of Arts degree from the University of Pennsylvania, Boulton completed a D.Phil. from the University of Oxford, studying at St. John's College, in 1976 and a Ph.D. from the University of Pennsylvania in 1978. He taught at Davidson College and Harvard University before becoming a faculty member at the University of Notre Dame in Notre Dame, Indiana where he retired as emeritus professor of history and medieval studies in 2015.

Boulton is a member of the Académie Internationale d'Héraldique. In 1993, he was elected as a Fellow of the Royal Heraldry Society of Canada, and he served as the registrar (1998–2022) and vice-dean (2004–22) of the society's College of Fellows. Since 2008, he has edited Alta Studia Heraldica: The Scholarly Journal of the Royal Heraldry Society of Canada. Boulton has produced armorial achievements for individual divisions of both Harvard and Notre Dame.

== Publications ==
- The Knights in the Crown: The Monarchical Orders of Knighthood in Late Medieval Europe, 1326–1520 (Boydell and Brewer, 1987); second edition, revised and expanded (2000), ISBN 0-85115-417-4.
- Co-editor, The Ideology of Burgundy: Fashioning a 'National' Identity in the Literary, Political and Historical Vernacular (Brill, 2006), ISBN 978-90-04-15359-2.
- "The Middle French Statutes of the Monarchical Order of the Ship (Naples, 1381): A Critical Edition with Introduction and Notes", Mediaeval Studies 47 (1985), pp. 168–271.
- "Belts, Brooches, Collars, and Crosses: The Development of the Insignia of the Monarchical Orders of Knighthood, 1325-1693", in Heraldry in Canada, 21.5 (December 1987), pp. 9–39.
- "Insignia of Power: The Use of Heraldic and Para-Heraldic Devices by Italian Princes, c. 1350-1500", in Art and Politics in Late Medieval and Early Renaissance Italy, 1250-1500, ed. Charles M. Rosenberg, (Notre Dame and London: University of Notre Dame Press, 1990), pp. 103–127.
- "Contesse, Duchesse, Marchise, Viscontesse: The Appearance of Feminine Forms of Titles of Dignity in France, 850-1200", in Romance Languages Annual, 5 (1993), pp. 5–13.
- "Dynasties, Domains, and Dominions: The Use and Non-use of Territorial Arms by French Princes, c. 1200-c.1500", in Académie Internationale d’Héraldique, VIII Colloquium, Canterbury, 29 August-4 September 1993, Proceedings, Cecil R. Humphery-Smith, ed., Canterbury, 1995, pp. 39–74.
- "Classic Knighthood as Nobiliary Dignity: The Knighting of Counts and Kings' Sons in England 1066-1272", in Medieval Knighthood V: Papers from the fifth Strawberry Hill Conference 1994, ed. S. Church, (Woodbridge: The Boydell Press 1995), pp. 40–100.
- "Sir Gawain and the Green Knight: A Poem for Henry of Grosmont?" (with W. G. Cooke), Medium Aevum 68 (1999), pp. 32–44.
- "The Monarchical (and Curial) Orders of Knighthood before the Reformation: A Reassessment in the Light of Recent Research", in Les Ordres de Chevalerie, ed. André Damien, Membre de l’Institut (Paris: Fondation Singer-Polignac, 1999), pp. 85–136.
- "The Treatise on Armory in Christine de Pizan's Livre des Fais d’Armes et de Chevalerie and its place in the Tradition of Heraldic Didacticism", in Contexts and Continuities: Proceedings of the IVth International Colloquium on Christine de Pizan (Glasgow, 21–27 July 2000), published in honour of Lilane Dulac, ed. Angus J. Kennedy et al. (Glasgow, Univ. of Glasgow Press, 2002), Vol. I, pp. 87–98.
- "A Fair Field Full of Folk (But Only Beyond the Sea): The Study of the Nobilities of Latin Europe", in Historically Speaking 4.2 (November 2002), pp. 5–7.
- "Knighthood and Nobility in the Lay Orders and Nobiliary Societies of the Fourteenth and Fifteenth Centuries", in As Ordens militares e de Cavalaria na Construção do Moundo Ocidental – Actas do IV Encontro sobre Ordens Militares, (Lisbon, Portugal: Edições Colibri/ Câmara Municipal de Palmela, Portugal, 2005), pp. 561–583.
- "Henry VII and Henry VIII, 1485-1547", in Princes and Princely Culture 1450-1650, Vol. II, ed. Martin Gosman et al., Instituut voor Cultuurwetenschappelijk Onderzoek Groningen ( Leiden: Brill, 2005), II, pp. 129–190.
- "Headgear of Nobiliary Rank in Germany, Italy, France, and England: The First Phases in the History of the National Systems", in Streekwapens en Regional Heraldiek – L’Héraldique Régionale – Regional Heraldry – Regionalheraldik: Congreverslag van het XIIe internationaal Heraldisch Colloquium … Report XII. International Colloquium on Heraldry, Groningen 3-7 september 2001, ed. Hans de Boo, et al. (Bedum, NL, 2006), pp. 60–79.
- "The Curial Orders of Knighthood of the Confraternal Type: Their Changing Forms, Functions, and Values in the Eyes of their Contemporaries, 1325-2006", in World Orders of Knighthood and Merit, ed. Guy Stair Sainty and Rafal Heydel-Mankoo (Buckingham, UK, and Wilmington, DE: Burke's Peerage & Gentry, Ltd., 2006), pp. 205–239
- "The Origins of a Damnosa Haereditas: The Degeneration of Heraldic Emblematics in the future and current United States and the Origins of the Sigilloid Display-emblem, 1608-1798", in Genealogica &Heraldica: Proceedings of the XXVI International Congress for Genealogical and Heraldic Sciences, ed. André Vandewalle et al. (Brussels: Vlaamse Overheid, 2006), pp. 121–147.
- "Le symbolisme attribué aux couleurs héraldiques dans les traités de blason des XIVe, XVe et XVIe siècles". Le Langage figuré: Actes du XIIe Colloque international, Université McGill, Montréal, 4-5-6 octobre 2004, pub. par Giuseppe di Stefano et Rose M. Bidler (Montreal, 2007), pp. 63–88.
- "Arms and Multiple Identities: Changing Patterns in the Representation of Two or More of the identities of a Single Armiger in Different Regions, c. 1140-c. 1520", in Genealogica & Heraldica: Identität in Genealogie und Heraldik. XXIXth International Congress of Genealogical and Heraldic Sciences, Stuttgart 2010 (Stuttgart, 2012), pp. 116–139.
- "The Heraldic Emblematics of the Provinces of British North America and their Successors before and after the Partition of 1776/83: A Study in Contrasts", in Genealogica & Heraldica: Grenzen in Genealogie en Heraldik – Frontiers in Genealogy and Heraldry – Frontières dans la généalogie de l’héraldique – Proceedings of the XXXth International Congress of Genealogical and Heraldic Sciences, held at Maastricht 24–28 September 2012, ed. Jan T. Anema et al. ( 's-Gravenhage : Stichting De Nederlandse Leeuw, 2014), pp. 39–68
- "The Display of Arms in their Primary Martial Contexts: Shields, Horse-Trappers, Martial Coats, Crests, Ailettes, Part IIB. The Pre-Classic Period in England, c. 1217 – c. 1327: Flags", in The Coat of Arms, ser. 4, vol. 2, no. 236, (2019), pp. 27–59.

== Arms ==
Coat of arms of D'Arcy Boulton
Notes Granted by the College of Arms 18 June 1974 Crest On the Helm of an Esquire with a collar-band of demi-maple-leaves, a lip-band of demi-roses and a single bar Or, set in a Military Loyalist's Coronet Argent, a tun fesswise transfixed with a bird-bolt palewise Or, thereon a gryphon statant tail extended Azure, langued Gules and armed Argent gorged with a crown pallisado and therefrom a chain reflected over its back also Argent. Escutcheon Quarterly, first and fourth Azure, three bird-bolts in pale fesswise heads to the sinister Or (for Boulton) Second Argent, on a chevron Vert between three bugle-horns Sable a crescent of the First for difference (for Forster); Third, Gules two lions passant Argent debruised by a bendlet Ermine for difference (for Strange). Motto Above the crest: PERILLEUSE ET PRECIEUSE (Latin for 'Perilous and precious'); Base motto: SAGITTAE VIAM MONSTRANT (Latin for 'Arrows show the way') Badge A sprig of arrowhead (sagitta latifolia) proper, showing three leaves and two flowers, arising from a formalized pond, barry wavy of five, Azure and Argent.

== See also ==
- Canadian Heraldic Authority
- Committee on Heraldry of the New England Historic Genealogical Society
