= De situ orbis from Albi =

Italian manuscript

De situ orbis
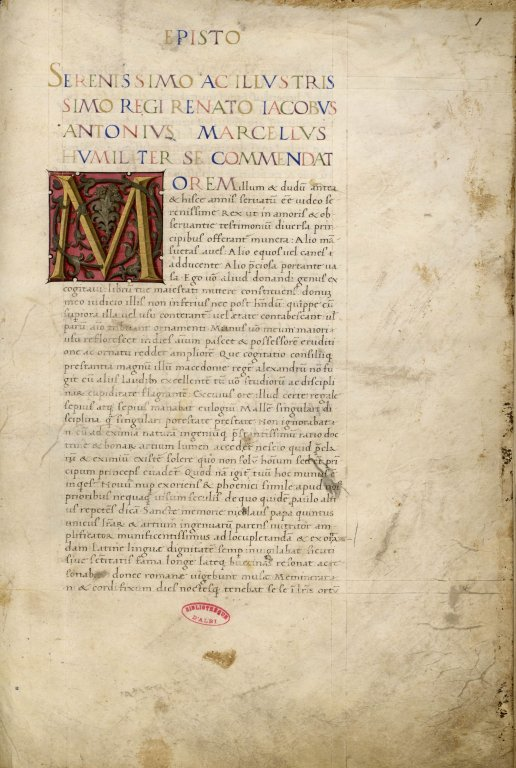
- First page of manuscript, f.1r.
- Artist: Giovanni Bellini
- Year: 1458 – 1459
- Dimensions: 37 cm × 25 cm (15 in × 9.8 in)
- Location: Albi, France

The De situ orbis from Albi is an illuminated manuscript of Strabo's Geography, of Italian provenance, dated 1459 and today housed in the Bibliothèques d'Albi (Ms. 77). It is an example of Renaissance illumination.

This text by Strabo was translated from Ancient Greek into Latin by Guarino of Verona on the orders of Venetian general Jacopo Antonio Marcello and presented as a diplomatic gift to René of Anjou on September 13, 1459. It constitutes part of a collection of books sent by the Italian military officer to the French prince, both bibliophiles and enthusiasts of ancient culture. The esteemed manuscript was presumably composed in Padua in a humanist style, embellished with exceptional faceted initials inspired by antiquity. The manuscript is particularly noteworthy for its two miniatures, which are presented as small paintings. These depict the translator, the patron, and the recipient of the work. The miniatures have been attributed to various artists by art historians, but are currently considered to be the work of Giovanni Bellini. They played a role in disseminating the style of the Italian Renaissance in France, particularly in the illuminated manuscripts of King René. The manuscript is thought to have reached Albi at the end of the 15th century or the beginning of the following century and is now part of the collections of the library of Albi Cathedral.

== History of the manuscript ==
=== Translation and production ===
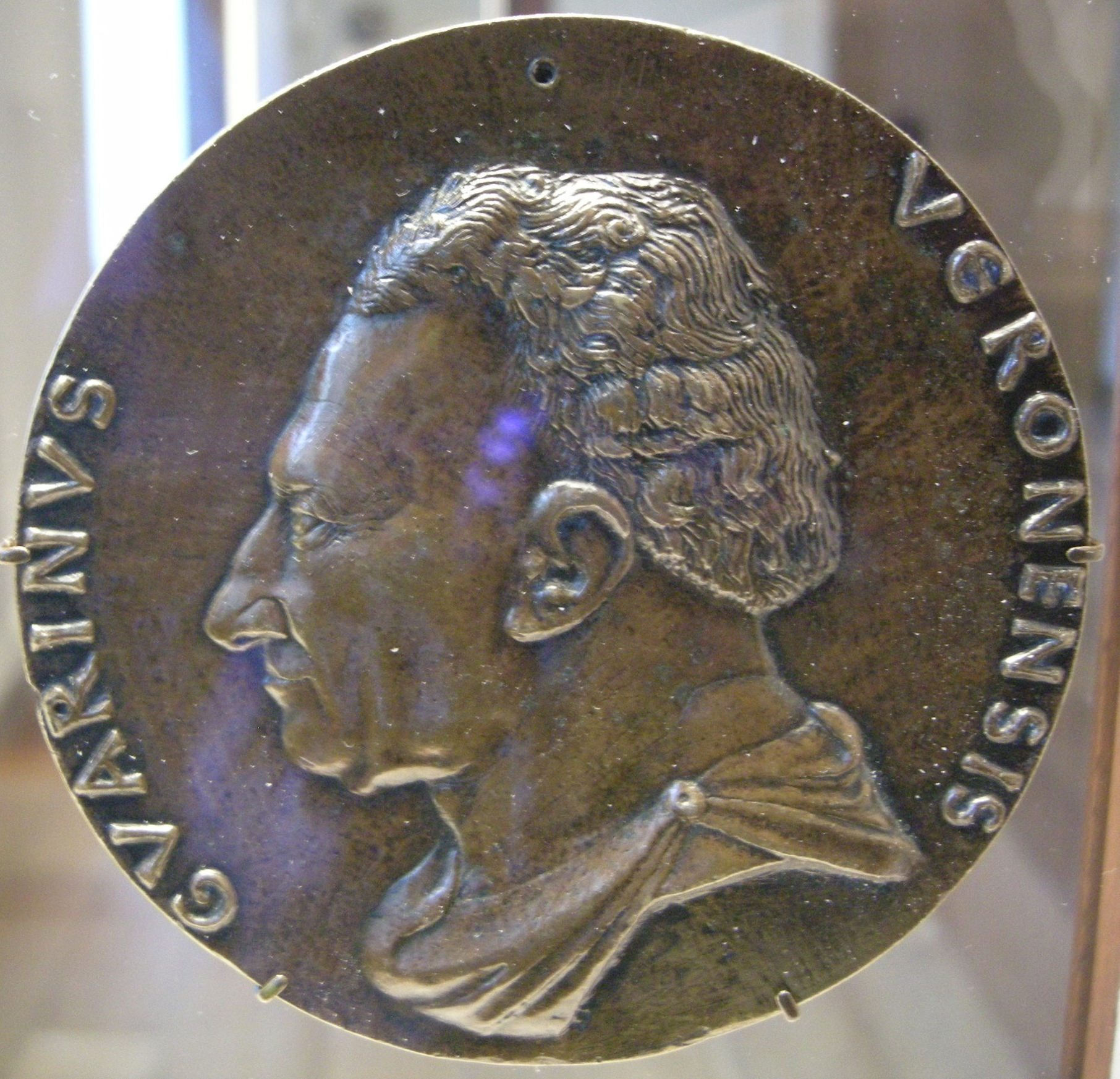
Medal by Matteo de' Pasti, representing Guarino of Verona, translator of the work, c. 1446, National Gallery of Art

Guarino of Verona (1370–1460), an Italian humanist residing in Ferrara, was commissioned by Pope Nicholas V to translate the Geography of the ancient Greek author Strabo into Latin. This is referenced in the manuscript's dedication. The Pope had also enlisted another translator, the Roman Gregory Tifernas, to work on the second part. However, the Pope's death in 1455 ended their collaboration. Jacopo Antonio Marcello (1399–1464), a Venetian military officer and senator, then commissioned Guarino alone to complete the translation. Guarino translated the entire work, including the part previously assigned to Tifernate. Marcello received the finished manuscript on July 13, 1458. (Note: Bodleian Library, Oxford, Ms.Canon.Class.lat.301.)

Marcello promptly had two copies produced, one of which, a highly esteemed exemplar, became the Albi manuscript between 1458 and 1459. (Note: The other is kept at the Laurentian Library, Florence, XXX.7.) Upon completion and illumination of the copy, it was presented to René of Anjou, King of Naples, as evidenced by the dedication dated September 13, 1459.

=== A Venetian gift to René of Anjou ===
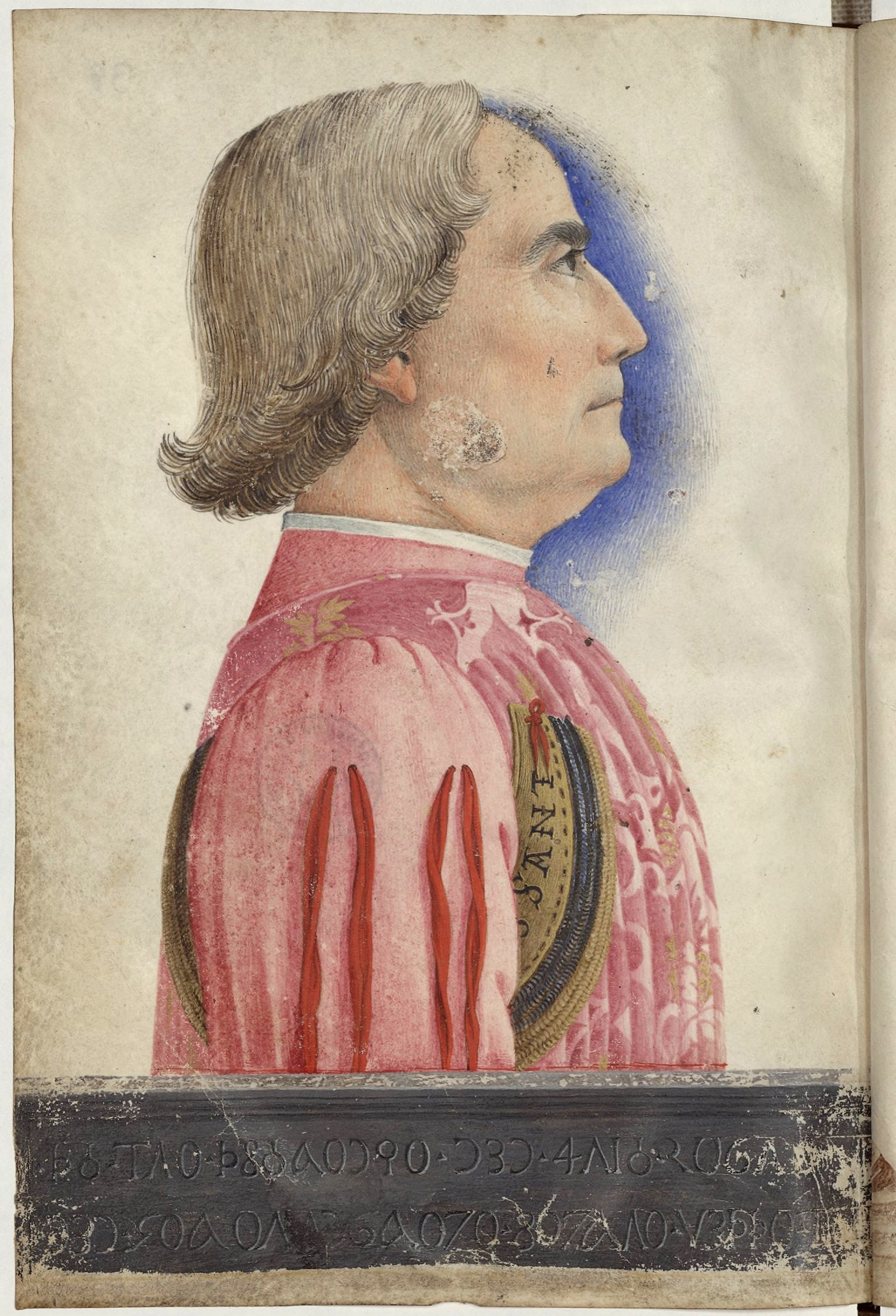
Portrait of Jacopo Antonio Marcello attributed to Giovanni Bellini, Martyrdom of Saint Maurice and his Comrades, circa 1453.

The Albi manuscript is part of a collection of rare books that were exchanged between the Venetian general and the French prince. The Republic of Venice, represented by the general, had temporarily endorsed René of Anjou's claim to the throne of the Kingdom of Naples. René engaged in conflict with Alfonso V of Aragon intending to conquer the Neapolitan kingdom. This was undertaken after Queen Joan II of Naples, who had no children, had designated both princes as her heirs. René engaged in combat with the King of Aragon in Italy between 1438 and 1442 but was ultimately unsuccessful. In recognition of his support, Marcello was inducted into the Order of the Crescent, established by René in 1448, along with Francesco Sforza, who had also assisted the French prince. During this period, the Venetian general sent books to René of Anjou and his wife, Isabelle of Lorraine. This correspondence fostered a genuine intellectual friendship, rooted in a shared passion for books and ancient authors. The collection comprised approximately ten books, each identified by its dedication at the beginning of the manuscript.

In a notable shift of alliances, the Republic of Venice eventually formed an alliance with Alfonso V of Aragon, René's rival and the victor in Naples, against the Sforza family, who had assumed control of Milan in 1450. Marcello sought to maintain the alliance with the French and to preserve cordial relations with René of Anjou. In 1453, he dispatched René a Martyrdom of Saint Maurice and his Comrades, the patron saint of the Order of the Crescent, some of whose miniatures are also attributed to Giovanni Bellini or his father Jacopo. (Note: Library of the Arsenal, Ms.940.) Subsequently, upon assuming the governorship of Padua, the Venetian general dispatched another illuminated work to the Angevin prince on March 1, 1457. This comprised a Latin translation of Claudius Ptolemy's Geography (or Cosmography), (Note: National library of France, Lat.17542.) accompanied by a world map, a sphere, and descriptions and maps of the Holy Land. This work was produced by a scribe and illuminator from Padua. De situ orbis appears to be the final manuscript in this series of diplomatic exchanges, which concluded with the death of Marcello's son and his relocation to Udine in 1461.

=== Fate ===
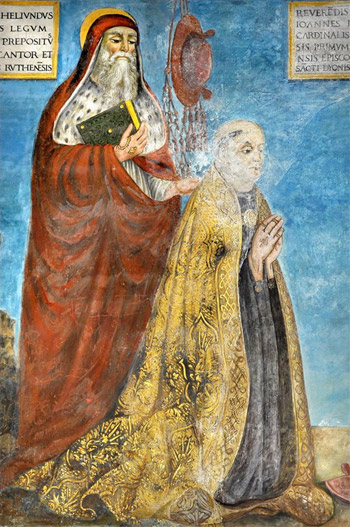
Portrait of Jean Jouffroy in Albi's Sainte-Cécile cathedral.

The subsequent history of the manuscript following its passage through the hands of René of Anjou and after his demise is not definitively known. The precise manner by which it came to be in Albi remains uncertain. According to tradition, the work reached the town during the episcopate of Louis d'Amboise, which is thought to have spanned the period between 1474 and 1503. D'Amboise served as an advisor to the French kings and bequeathed his extensive library to the Albi Cathedral. Nevertheless, the manuscript also bears the hallmarks of the previous bishop of the city, Jean Jouffroy, who served between 1462 and 1473. Jouffroy was a close associate of King René and undertook diplomatic missions on his behalf in Italy. Jouffroy was a bibliophile known to have pillaged the libraries of the abbeys he oversaw as a commendatory abbot, extracting manuscripts containing rare and ancient texts. Additionally, he was connected to Guarino of Verona. They both took part in the Council of Ferrara in 1438, and Jouffroy was in Italy when Guarino completed the translation of Strabo in 1458. Furthermore, the Italian humanist consented to provide tutoring to the French prelate's nephew. Additionally, Jouffroy possessed a Latin translation of the Vita Xenophontis, completed by Guarino's son. In his study of the manuscripts, art historian François Avril determined that a group belonging to René of Anjou was preserved for a time in the chapter library of Albi Cathedral before being dispersed into foreign collections. Following the French Revolution, the cathedral's manuscripts entered the collections of the city's public library, first at the Hôtel de Rochegude and later at the current Pierre Amalric Library.

The book's binding dates from the 1900s, but it originally had a 15th-century binding until that time. This binding was decorated with hot gilding and was one of the oldest known in Europe. However, it was severely damaged, and its spine was restored in the 18th century. Following the replacement of the binding, the original cover was preserved separately; however, it was subsequently lost during a loan for study to the Library of the Arsenal in Paris in the 1960s. Its current state is only known through a record made by a binder in the early 20th century.

== Description ==
=== Composition and text ===
The manuscript contains 389 folios. The Latin text includes:

- The first dedicatory epistle (folios 1 - 2 recto), written by Jacopo Antonio Marcello and addressed to René of Anjou, dated September 13, 1459;
- The second epistle (f.2r - 3r), written by Guarino of Verona and addressed to Pope Nicholas V, the original patron of the text;
- The third epistle (f.4 verso - 6v), also written by Guarino and addressed to the second patron, Marcello;
- The text of the seventeen books of Strabo's De situ orbis (f.7v - 389r), translated into Latin by Guarino.

Guarino of Verona's autograph manuscript, with his annotations, is preserved at the Bodleian Library in Oxford, and this allows the text of the Albi manuscript to be reconstructed. In contrast with Guarino's assertion in the dedication, the text was not translated from the ancient Greek manuscript held in the collections of the Greek Cardinal Ruthenus. (Note: Vatican Library, Vat.Gr.174.) Indeed, books I to X were translated from an alternative Greek manuscript belonging to Cyriacus of Ancona. (Note: The first part is now preserved at Eton College, Ms.141.) Books XI to XVII were translated from a manuscript that is currently located in Moscow. (Note: State Historical Museum, Moscow, Gr.204.) Both manuscripts contain annotations in Guarino's hand. The Ruthenus manuscript was only sent to him by the Pope's librarian in September 1453, after Guarino had already begun his work. The Ruthenus manuscript likely served as a revision tool for his translation. The Oxford manuscript also contains the second and third epistles, which were not written by the translator but were corrected by him.

The preliminary epistles underscore the diplomatic function of the work, offering a platform to laud the recipient. In Guarino's letter to Nicholas V, the author draws a parallel between the Pope and Christ resurrecting Lazarus, as evidenced by the Pope's order for translating Strabo's text, which was to be rediscovered for the Christian West. Furthermore, in the same letter, Guarino compares Strabo's text and the Septuagint, the Greek translation of the Hebrew Bible commissioned by the Egyptian King Ptolemy II around 270 BC. In his letter to Marcello, Guarino compares him and Hercules, who is depicted holding up the globe in place of Atlas. This is a reference to the Venetian general's role in supporting the translation of Strabo's Geography, which was undertaken at the behest of the Pope. Ultimately, in Marcello's missive to René of Anjou, the Venetian enumerates the alternative gifts he could have sent instead of the book: birds, horses, dogs, or precious vases. However, in his estimation, the work of a genius was far more commensurate with the rank of René.

=== Script ===
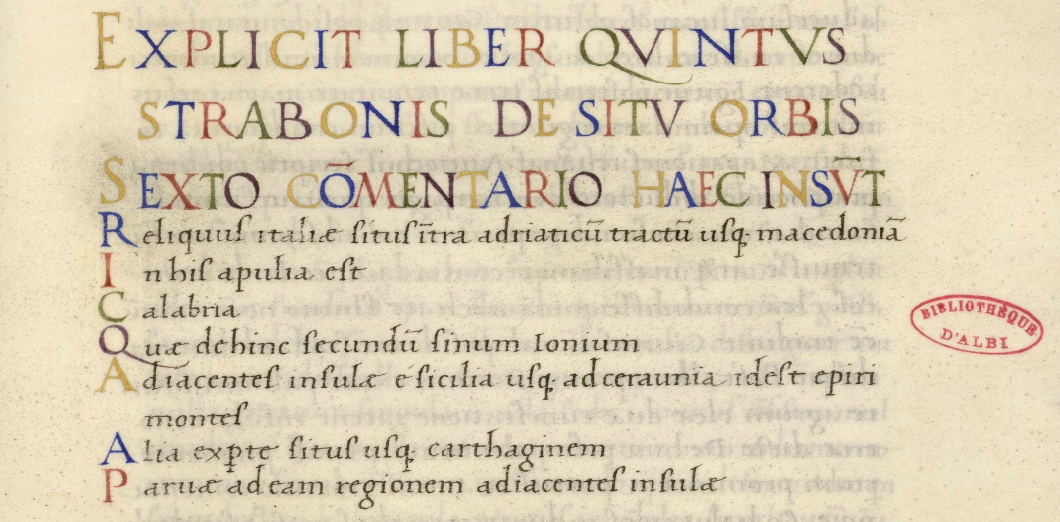
Sample text from the manuscript, at the end of Book V, f.117r.

The Albi manuscript is written in a humanist style. It seems probable that the individual responsible for the manuscript's transcription was active between Padua and Venice between 1460 and 1470. His handwriting has been identified in some manuscripts, including one containing consolatory texts dedicated to Marcello in 1461, on the occasion of his son's death; (Note: Glasgow University Library, Ms.Hunter 201.) a manuscript of Tacuinum sanitatis; (Note: Rouen libraries, Ms.3054.) and other works intended for the humanists and prelates John Vitéz and Hermolao Barbaro. The titles are inscribed in polychrome, reminiscent of the handwriting of Bartolomeo Sanvito, a renowned Paduan humanist scribe active at the papal court in the latter third of the fifteenth century. Sanvito possibly was influenced or trained by the scribe of the present manuscript.

=== Initials ===
As in the manuscripts of Sanvito, the Strabo manuscript contains 23 faceted initials, also known as prismatic initials. The design of these initials is inspired by Roman capitals and is intended to create the effect of relief. They are placed on a colored background adorned with scrollwork and imitation nails, which give the impression that they are fastened to the page. This type of initial is also present in the Cosmography manuscript by Ptolemy, which was previously presented to René of Anjou in 1457. American art historian Millard Meiss put forth the hypothesis that this may be an early work by Andrea Mantegna, who was deeply interested in ancient epigraphy at the time, to the extent that this type of initial was affectionately dubbed litterae mantiniane. Nevertheless, this hypothesis has not been endorsed by other historians. This lettering style was already used in other works from Padua and subsequently disseminated throughout Italy during the Renaissance. This is evidenced by a manuscript by Sanvito, the Vitae Malchi et Pauli by Saint Jerome. (Note: Biblioteca Marciana, Venice, Ms.Lat.II.39.)

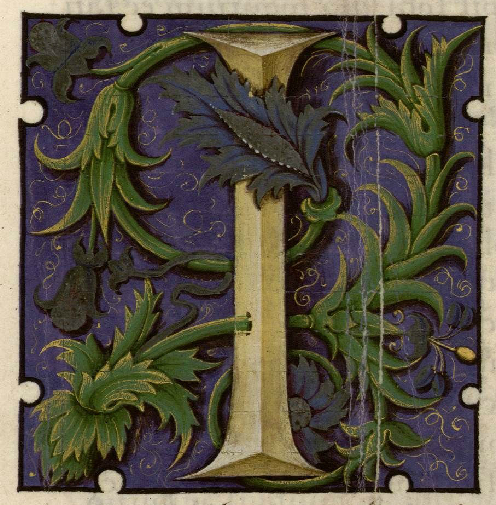
Lettrine I, f.35r.

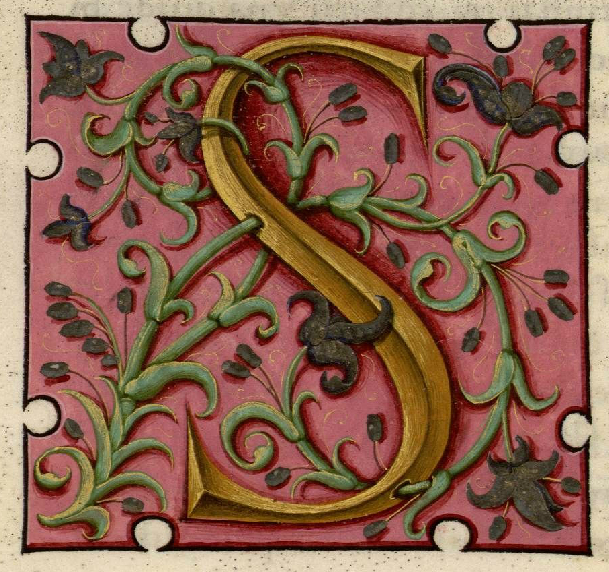
Lettrine S, f.54v.

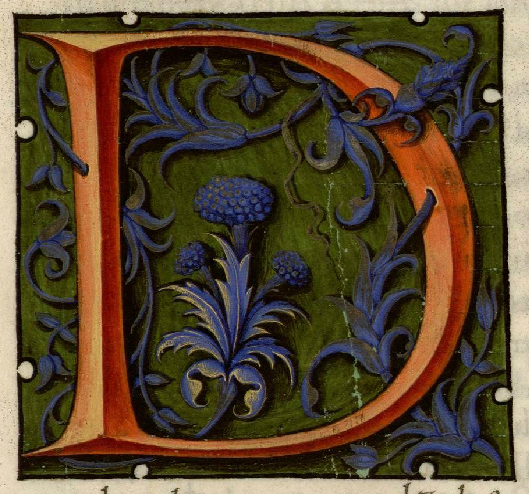
Letter D, f.81r.

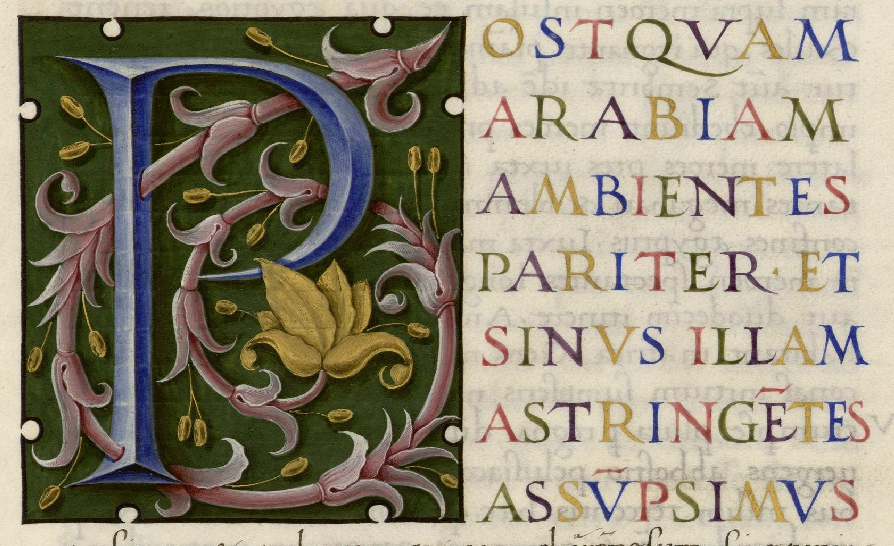
Letter P, f.363r.

== Miniatures ==
=== Description ===
The manuscript is particularly renowned for its two full-page miniatures, between the second and third epistles. The first illustration (f.3v) depicts Guarino of Verona, the translator, on the right, attired in a voluminous red doctoral toga, presenting his work to Jacopo Antonio Marcello, the patron, who is positioned on the left. Marcello is clad in a short doublet covered with an orange brocade cape. The portrait of the translator was likely inspired by a medal of Matteo de' Pasti, which was engraved a few years earlier. In comparison to the portrait of the Martyrdom of Saint Maurice, the Venetian general is depicted as older and with more pronounced features. Additionally, two young men are present in the scene. Among the figures depicted are Marcello's son, Valerio, on one side and Guarino's son, Battista, on the other. The latter is attired in a purple toga, in accordance with his role as a professor. The scene is set in front of an archway surmounted by a triangular pediment encased in a blue halo. The second miniature (f. 4r) depicts Marcello presenting his work, with its original binding, to René of Anjou. The former is in a kneeling position before the French prince, who is seated on a throne. The throne, inspired by Tuscan sculpture, is decorated with a bas-relief representing a rabbit and a lion, topped by the Latin inscription clementiae augustae ("August Clemency"). This inscription serves to indicate the difference in rank between the two individuals. The French prince is wearing a round-brimmed hat and pointed shoes. The background landscape features a palm tree and buildings arranged in a regular perspective.

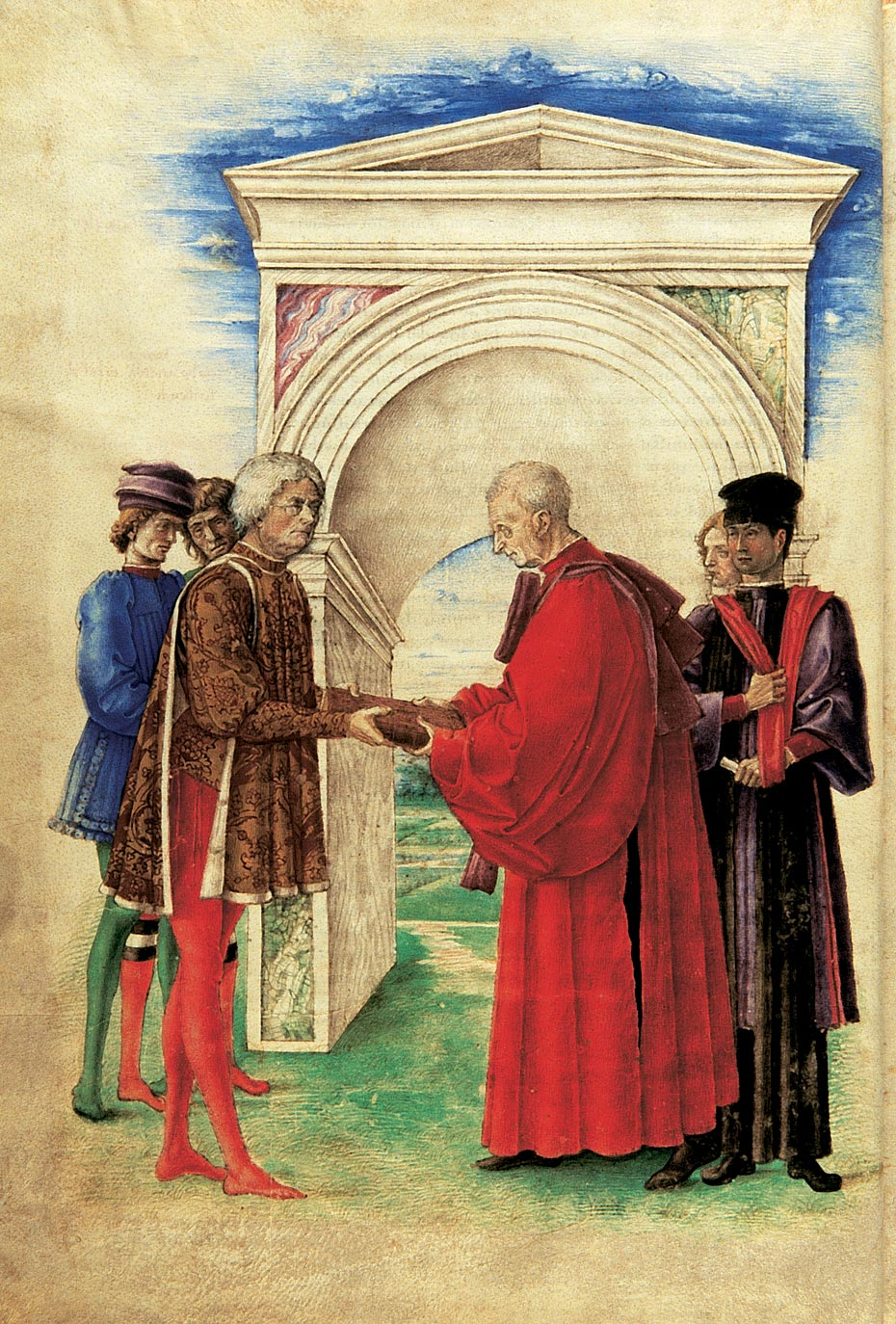
Guarino handing over his work to Jacopo Antonio Marcello, f.3v.

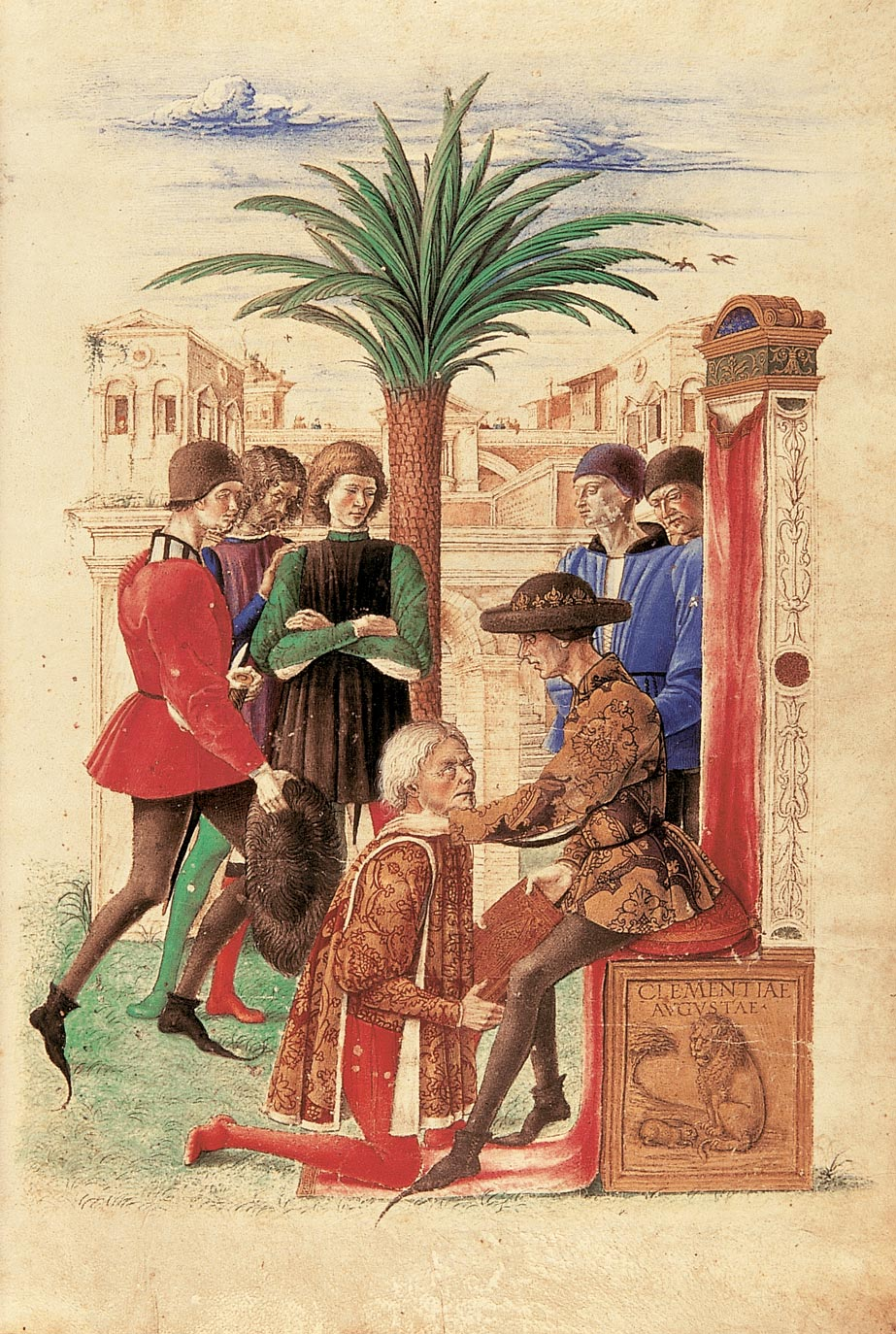
Marcello giving the manuscript to René d'Anjou, f.4r.

=== Attribution ===
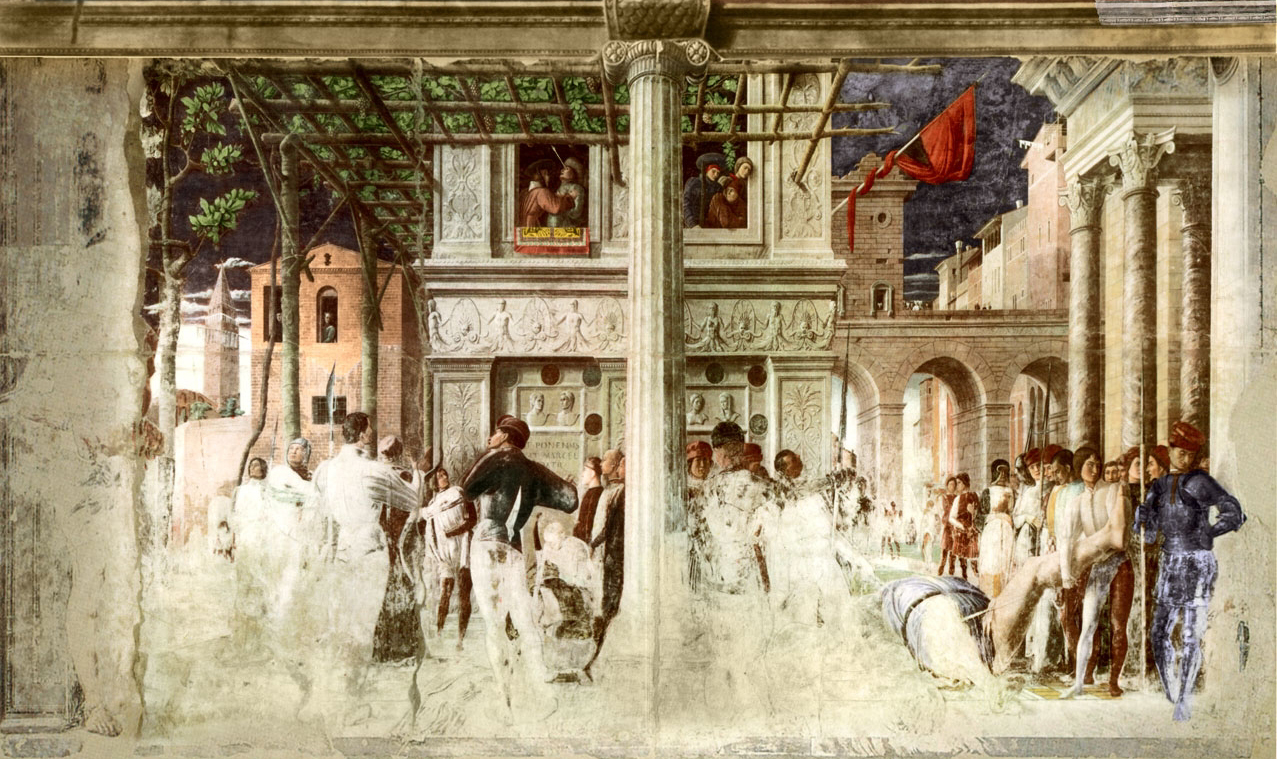
Mantegna, The Martyrdom of Saint Christopher, Ovetari chapel, church of the eremites in Padua.

The question of attribution for these two miniatures has been a topic of discussion for an extended period. In his 1957 monograph on Andrea Mantegna, Millard Meiss attributed the two paintings to this artist, or more precisely, to one of his collaborators. He drew comparisons between these two images and works by Mantegna executed contemporaneously in Padua, namely the frescoes in the Ovetari Chapel of the Church of the Eremitani in Padua and the panels of the altarpiece in San Zeno Church in Verona. In addition, Meiss posited that this collaborator was also influenced by the early works of his brother-in-law, Giovanni Bellini, who was then engaged in the production of the altarpiece for the Gattamelata Chapel in the Basilica of Saint Anthony. The second miniature contains a palm tree and surrounding architecture that recall the central column and buildings depicted in Mantegna's Martyrdom of Saint Christopher fresco in the Ovetari Chapel. Documents, as posited by Meiss, lend credence to this hypothesis. Two letters, dated March 4 and 14, 1459, from Louis III of Mantua, Mantegna's patron, authorized the latter to remain in the employ of Jacopo Antonio Marcello for a brief period to complete an operetta before returning to Mantua. This "small work", as referenced in the aforementioned letters, would be the painting of these two miniatures.

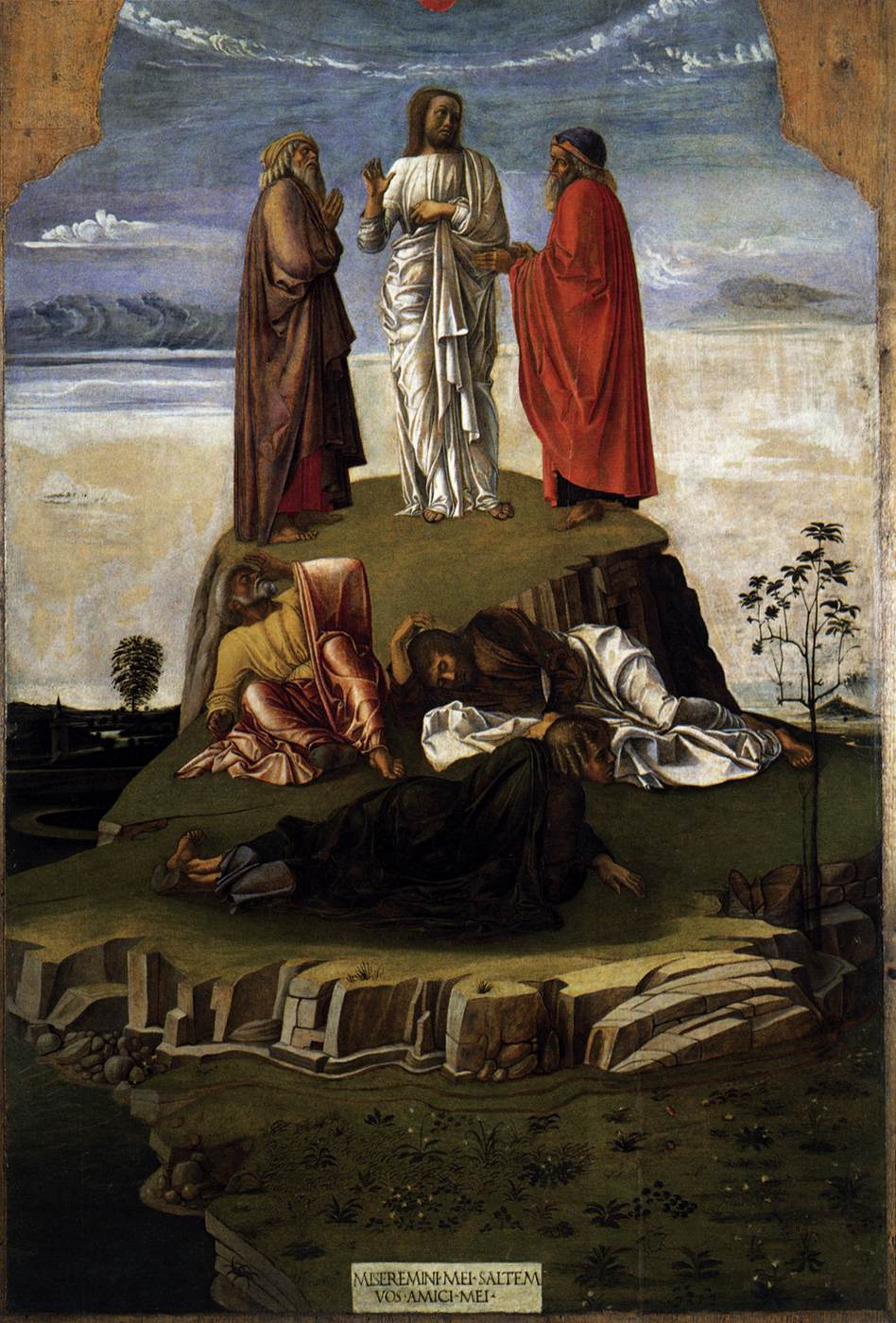
Transfiguration of Christ by Giovanni Bellini, Museo Correr.

Nevertheless, the attribution to Mantegna's workshop is not universally accepted. The operetta referenced in Louis of Mantua's letter has since been identified as other works, including the Saint Sebastian in Vienna, the Agony in the Garden in London, and the Saint George in Venice. Additionally, the miniatures of the Albi manuscript have been attributed to other artists, with the names of Marco Zoppo and Lauro Padovano proposed, though a consensus has not been reached.

The hypothesis proposed by Giovanni Bellini has gained greater acceptance within the academic community. When the manuscript was created, Bellini was still working with his father, Jacopo Bellini. The arch, which is present in the first miniature, was borrowed from his father. Additionally, he was influenced by his brother-in-law, Mantegna (who had married his sister), as evidenced by the aforementioned works. It seems probable that the miniatures were created by a painter inexperienced in producing manuscript paintings, as was the case with Giovanni Bellini. This is evidenced by the lack of a frame and the strict perspective. Moreover, as Luciano Bellosi observed, certain details evoke the artist's early works. Characters’ poses, features, and costumes are reminiscent of those in Three Stories of Drusilla and Saint John the Evangelist, a predella currently housed in the Royal Castle of Berchtesgaden. Additionally, the features and hairstyles of the young men resemble those of the figures in Transfiguration, which is now displayed at the Museo Correr.

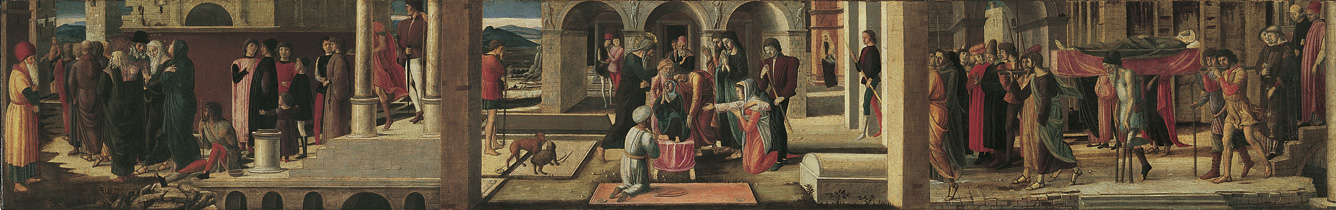
Giovanni Bellini, Three Stories of Drusilla and Saint John the Evangelist

== Influence of the manuscript on illumination of its time ==
The manuscript exerted a considerable influence on illumination during its own time. The initials of the aforementioned illuminator can be found in numerous subsequent manuscripts, including French works commissioned by René of Anjou. It appears that the illuminators working for his court, particularly the Master of the Geneva Boccaccio, were inspired by the Strabo models, as evidenced by their reproduction in manuscripts dating from 1470 to 1475. This is exemplified in Heures de Philippe de Gueldre, (Note: Morgan Library and Museum, New York, M.263.) a prayer book; (Note: Saint-Germain-en-Laye Public Library, Ms.R60732.) Rustican by Pietro de' Crescenzi; (Note: Musée Condé, Chantilly, Ms.340.) Livre des stratagèmes, Jean de Rovroy's translation of Frontinus; (Note: Royal Library of Belgique, Brussels, Ms.10475.) the Pantheologia by Raynerius de Pisis; (Note: National Library of Portugal, Lisbon, Ms.il.138.) Epistolae by Saint Augustine; (Note: Public Library of Marseille, Ms.209.) and Commentaire sur l'épître de saint Paul aux Romains by Origen. (Note: National Library of Portugal, Lisbon, Ms.il.124.)

Examples of lettering inspired by the Albi manuscript

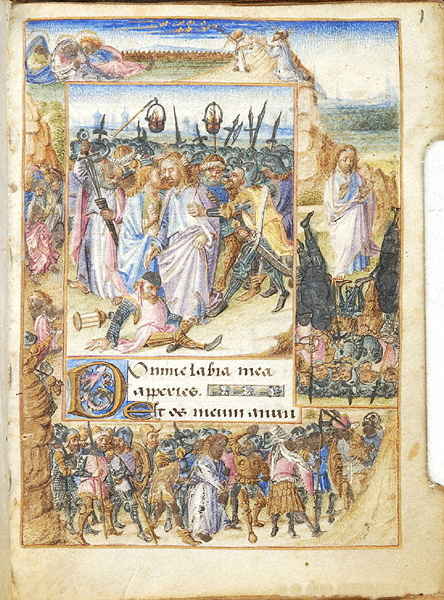
Heures de Philippe de Gueldre, f.1r.

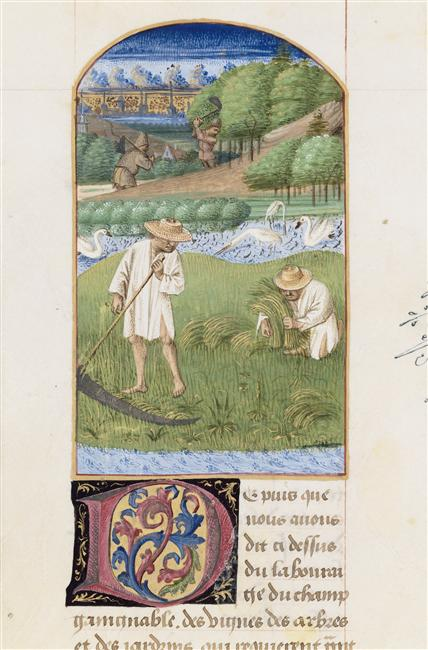
Rustican by Pietro de' Crescenzi, f.203v.

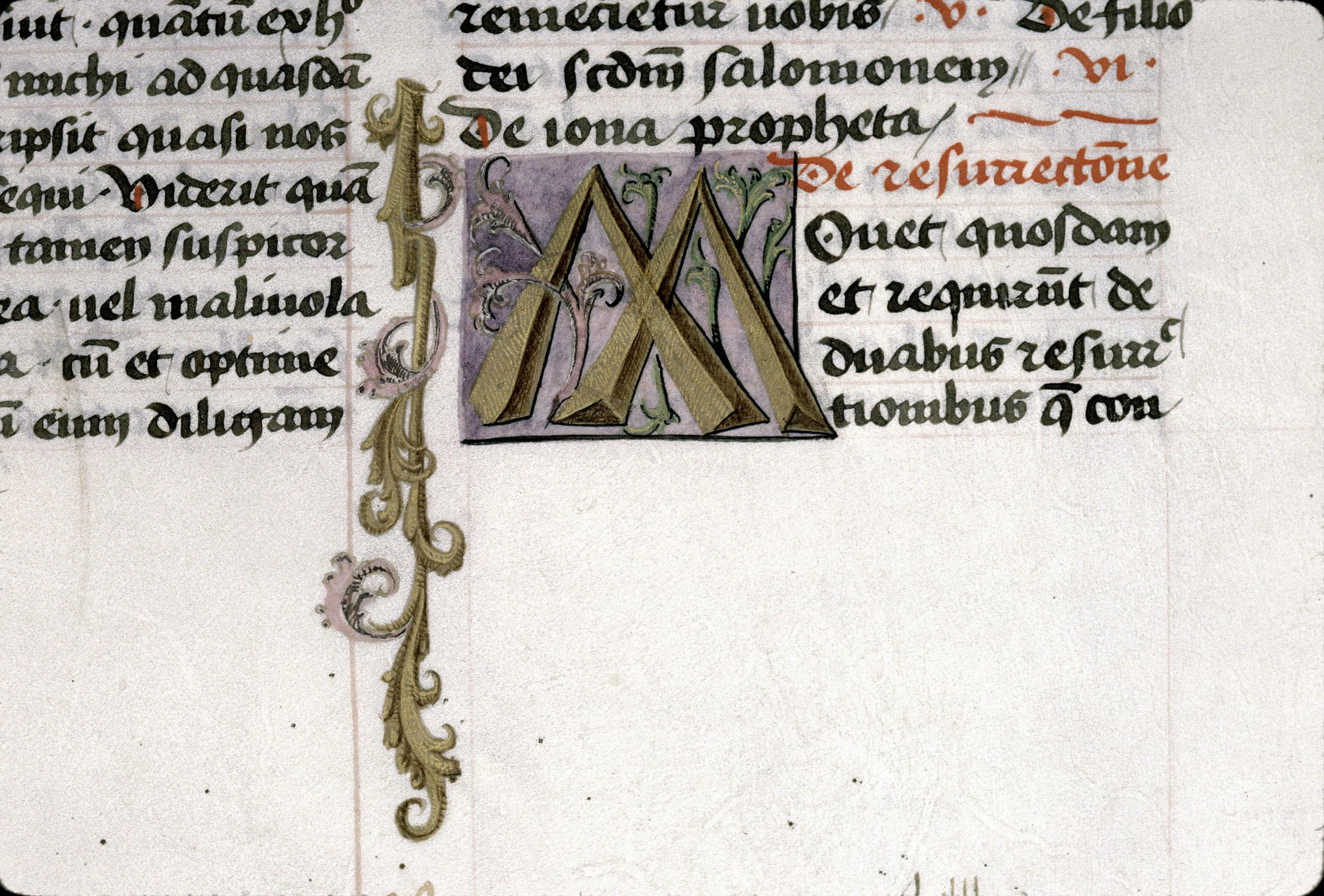
Epistolae by Saint Augustine, f.18r.

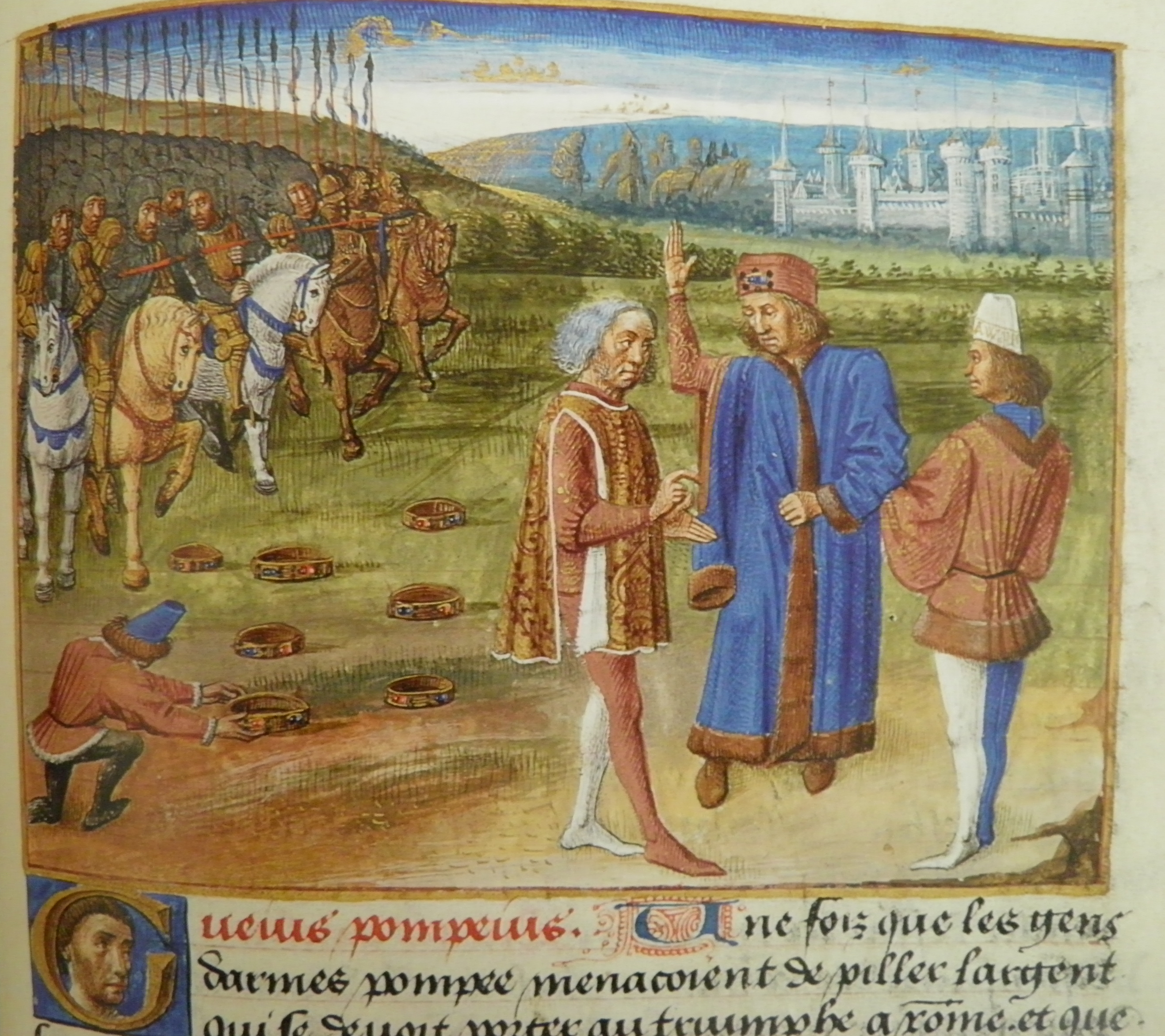
Pompey holding council with his lieutenants Servilius and Glaucia, extract from Livre des stratagèmes, f.115r.

Additionally, the Master of the Geneva Boccaccio was influenced by the illustrations in the Albi manuscript. In Livre des stratagèmes, a character is depicted in the miniature on folio 115, representing the preparation for Pompey's triumph. This figure is seen to adopt the same pose and costume as Marcello in the initial miniature of De situ orbis. It is similarly possible that these miniatures exerted an influence on Barthélemy d'Eyck concerning certain compositions and the posture of some courtiers in the miniatures of Le Livre des tournois by René of Anjou (f. 3v and f. 11). (Note: National Library of France, Fr.2695.)

== Bibliography ==
- Gautier, Marc-Édouard (2009). Splendeur de l'enluminure. Le roi René et les livres [The splendor of illumination. King René and books] (in French). Ville d'Angers/Actes Sud. pp. 226–227. ISBN 978-2-7427-8611-4.
- Desachy, Matthieu; Toscano, Gennaro (2010). Le Goût de la Renaissance italienne : Les manuscrits enluminés de Jean Jouffroy, cardinal d'Albi (1412–1473) [A Taste of the Italian Renaissance: The illuminated manuscripts of Jean Jouffroy, Cardinal of Albi (1412–1473)]. Trésors écrits albigeois (in French). Milan: Silvana editoriale. pp. 139–143 & 148–153.
- Agosti, Giovanni; Thiébaut, Dominique (2008). Mantegna (1431-1506) (in French). Hazan. pp. 122–123. ISBN 978-2-7541-0310-7.
- Margolis, Oren (2013). "Le Strabon du roi René: biographie politique du livre" [King René's Strabo: a political biography of the book]. Les Arts et les lettres en Provence au temps du roi René : Analyses, Rayonnement, Mémoire : Actes du colloque du 18 au 21 novembre 2009 [Arts and letters in Provence at the time of King René: Analyzes, Outreach, Memory: Proceedings of the conference from November 18 to 21, 2009]. Senefiance (in French). Aix-en-Provence: Publications de l’Université de Provence. pp. 77–86. ISBN 978-2853998895.
