= Jacopo Antonio Marcello =

Venetian military leader (1399–1464/5)

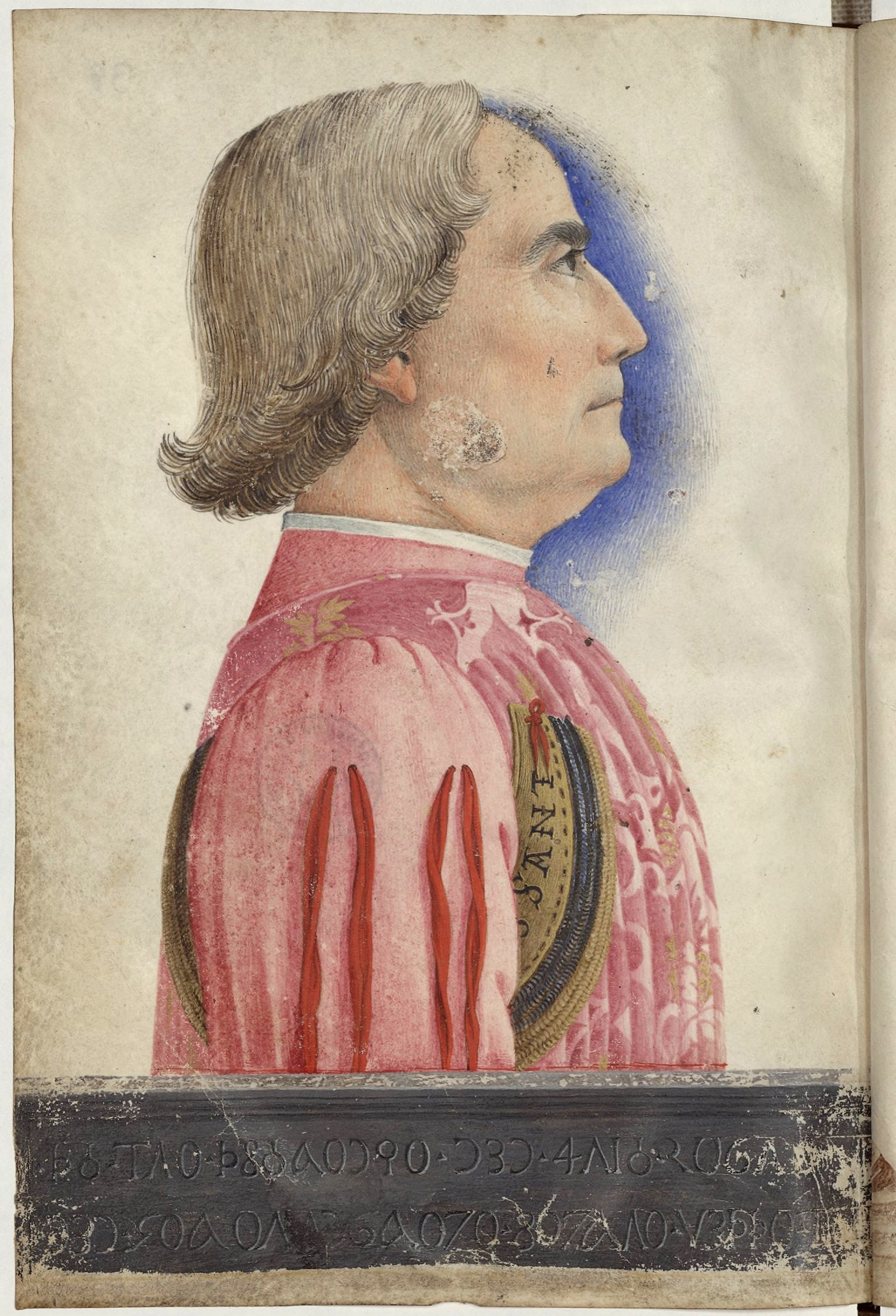
Marcello's portrait from a manuscript he commissioned, now Arsenal 940

Jacopo Antonio Marcello (1399–1464/65) was a Venetian patrician, military leader, Renaissance humanist and patron of letters.

== Family ==
Marcello was born in Venice in 1399, probably on 17 January, the son of Francesco Marcello and Maddalena Trevisan. His older brother Pietro became the bishop of Padua in 1409. His sister Margherita married Marco Foscari, brother of Doge Francesco Foscari. His father served in the Hungarian–Venetian war of 1411 and died in 1419.

In 1418, Marcello married Fiordelise Miani, daughter of Pietro Emiliani and Contarina Contarini. They had a son named Francesco and a daughter named Taddea. After his first wife's death, Marcello married a lady of the Capodivacca family of Padua in 1442. In 1443, he married for the third time to another Paduan, Lucia Lion di Bartolomeo, whose sister Anna married his son Francesco at the same time. In 1447, he was living the Castle of Monselice. On 1 January 1461, his eight-year-old son Valerio died, which greatly grieved him and led to an outpouring of condolences from Venetian men of letters.

== Political and military career ==
Marcello did not become involved in politics until 1438. In 1438–1439, during the Wars in Lombardy, he was the provveditore in Val Lagarina. In 1438, he escaped from besieged Brescia with Gattamelata. In 1439, he returned to the city with a relief army. In 1440, he was provveditore in Ravenna. In 1442, he was ambassador to Francesco Sforza. In 1444, he was provveditore in Lombardy. In 1446–1448, he was again provveditore of the army in Lombardy and also captain of Verona. He was the provveditore of the victorious army at the battle of Casalmaggiore in 1446, for which he was knighted by Micheletto Attendolo. He remained with the army almost continuously from 1447 to 1453. He was captain at Verona in 1447 and joined the retreat from Caravaggio in 1448. From 1449 to 1452, he was provveditore in Crema. For his actions at Casalmaggiore, he was popularly regarded as a war hero.

In 1462–1463, Marcello was lieutenant in Friuli. He was named provveditore of the army for the war that broke out against the Imperial Free City of Trieste in 1463. He personally led 500 cavalry into Istria and took command from Vitale Lando. Owing to the outbreak of the Ottoman–Venetian War, the war was short. Venice and Trieste agreed to terms on 17 December 1463. He died in his house in Venice between 5 August 1464 and July 1465. "One of the most distinguished men of his generation", he "must have been very close to the dogeship on a number of occasions".

== Humanism ==
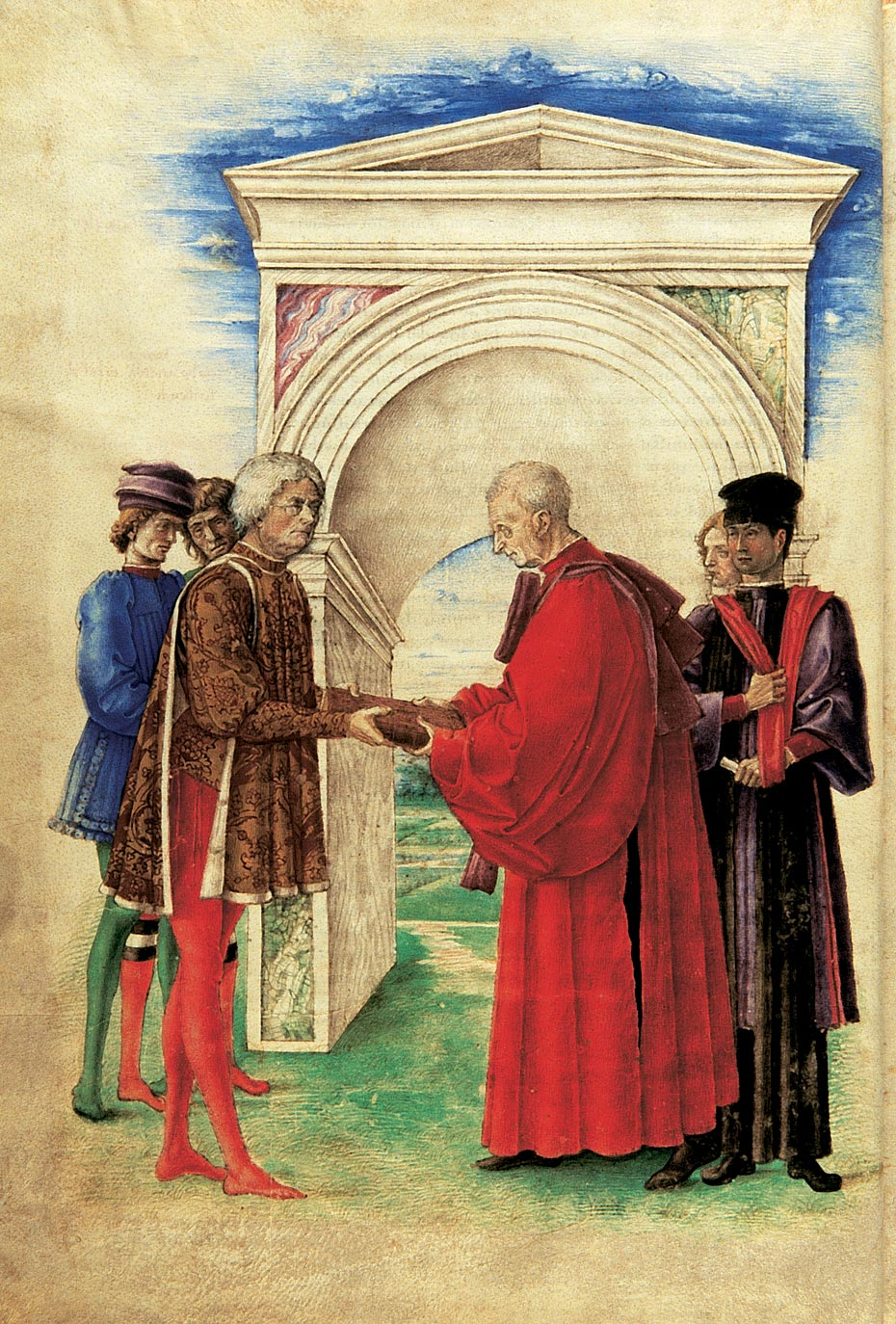
Marcello receiving Strabo's Cosmographia from Guarino

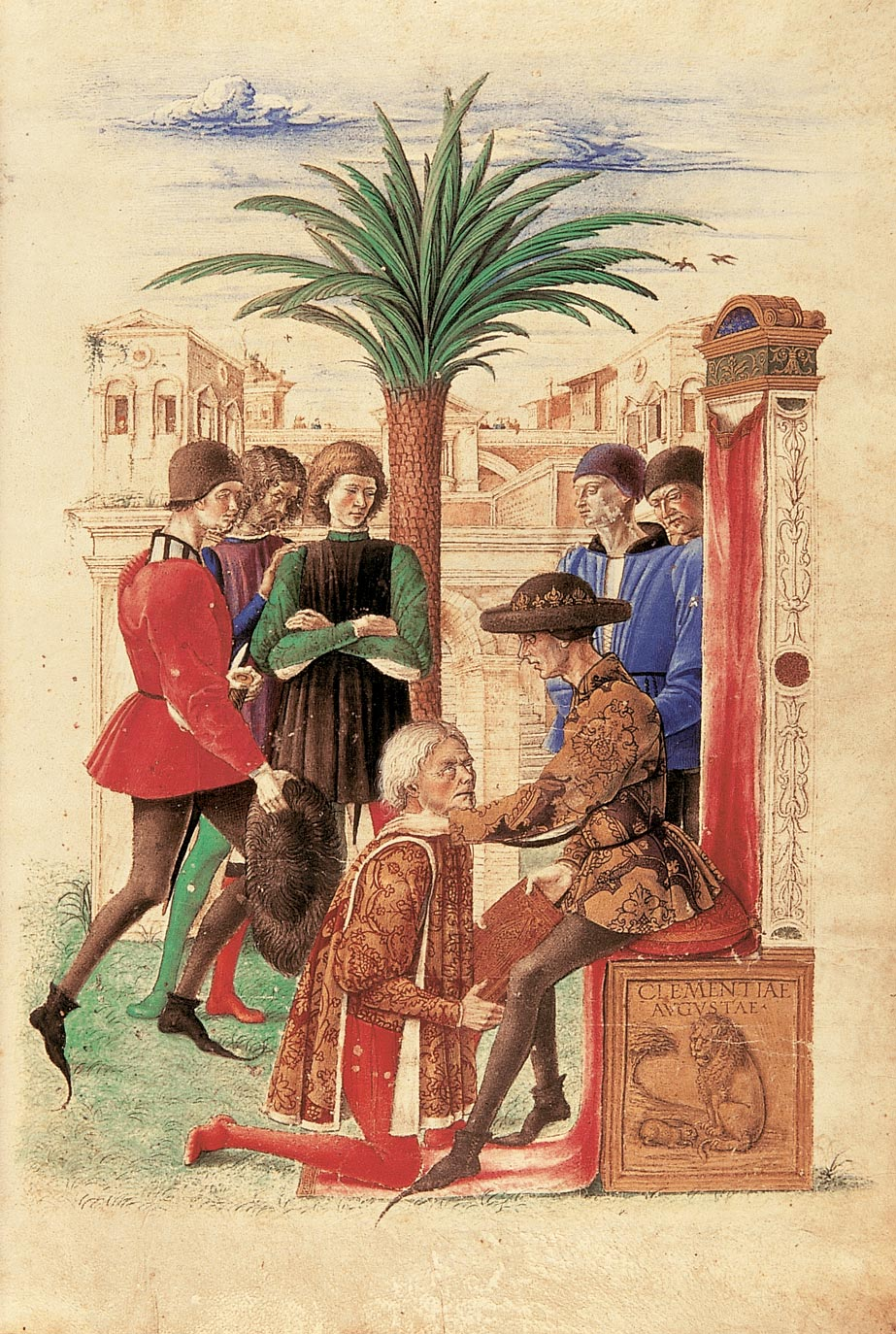
Marcello presenting the Cosmographia to King René

Marcello may have attended the University of Padua. He was the recipient of letters from Francesco Filelfo, Gianmario Filelfo and Maffeo Vallaresso.

In 1453, Marcello wrote a dedicatory letter and some poetry for a copy of the Martyrdom of Saint Maurice and his Comrades addressed to Giovanni Cossa, prefect of the Order of the Crescent, whose patron saint Maurice was. He also wrote dedicatory letters addressed to King René of Naples for the following works:

- Lauro Quirini's translation of De sacerdotio Christi (1452)
- an anonymous translation of De sacerdotio Christi (1452–1453)
- an anonymous translation of John Chrysostom's De tollerandis calamitatibus (1453)
- an anonymous translation of Ptolemy's Cosmographia (1457)
- Guarino Veronese's translation of Strabo's De situ orbis (1459), which he commissioned

According to Francesco Sansovino, Marcello wrote many speeches on "diverse subjects".

Marcello ordered the production of three illuminated manuscripts that are today leading examples of Renaissance illumination. The first was Paris, Bibliothèque de l'Arsenal, MS 940, which contains the Martyrdom of Saint Maurice and Marcello's dedication and poetry. The second was Albi, Bibliothèque Rochegude, MS 77, the illustration of which has sometimes been attributed to Andrea Mantegna. The third was University of Glasgow, Hunterian Museum Library, Cod. 201 (U.1.5), an unfinished deluxe manuscript intended for René.

It contains several works of consolation on the death of Marcello's son Valerio, including a Greek elegy by Francesco Filelfo with a translation by Ludovico Carbone and works by George of Trebizond, Battista Guarini, Isotta Nogarola, Pietro Perleone and Niccolò Sagundino.

== Sources ==
- Gullino, Giuseppe (2006). "Marcello, Jacopo Antonio". Dizionario Biografico degli Italiani (in Italian). Vol. 67: Macchi–Malaspina. Rome: Istituto dell'Enciclopedia Italiana. ISBN 978-88-12-00032-6.
- King, Margaret L. (1986). Venetian Humanism in an Age of Patrician Dominance. Princeton, New Jersey: Princeton University Press.
- King, Margaret L. (1994). The Death of the Child Valerio Marcello. University of Chicago Press.
- King, Margaret L. (2005a). "An Inconsolable Father and His Humanist Consolers: Jacopo Antonio Marcello, Venetian Nobleman, Patron, and Man of Letters". Humanism, Venice, and Women: Essays on the Italian Renaissance. Ashgate. pp. 221–246. Originally published in James Hankins, John Monfasani and Frederick Purnell Jr (eds.), Supplementum Festivum: Studies in Honor of Paul Oskar Kristeller (Binghamton, 1987).
- King, Margaret L. (2005b). "Jacopo Antonio Marcello and the War for the Lombard Plain". Humanism, Venice, and Women: Essays on the Italian Renaissance. Ashgate. pp. 63–88. Originally published in Paolo Pecorari (ed.), Continuità e discontinuità nella storia politica, economica e religiosa: Studi in onore di Aldo Stella (Neri Pozza Editore, 1993).
- Mallett, M. E. (1984). "Part I: c. 1400 to 1508". In M. E. Mallett; J. R. Hale (eds.). The Military Organisation of a Renaissance State: Venice, c. 1400 to 1617. Cambridge University Press. pp. 1–210.
