= Siege of Trieste =

Siege of Trieste may refer to:

- Siege of Trieste (1463), part of the Habsburg–Venetian wars
- Siege of Trieste (1813), part of the Napoleonic Wars
