= Martyrdom of Saint Maurice and his Comrades =

Manuscript

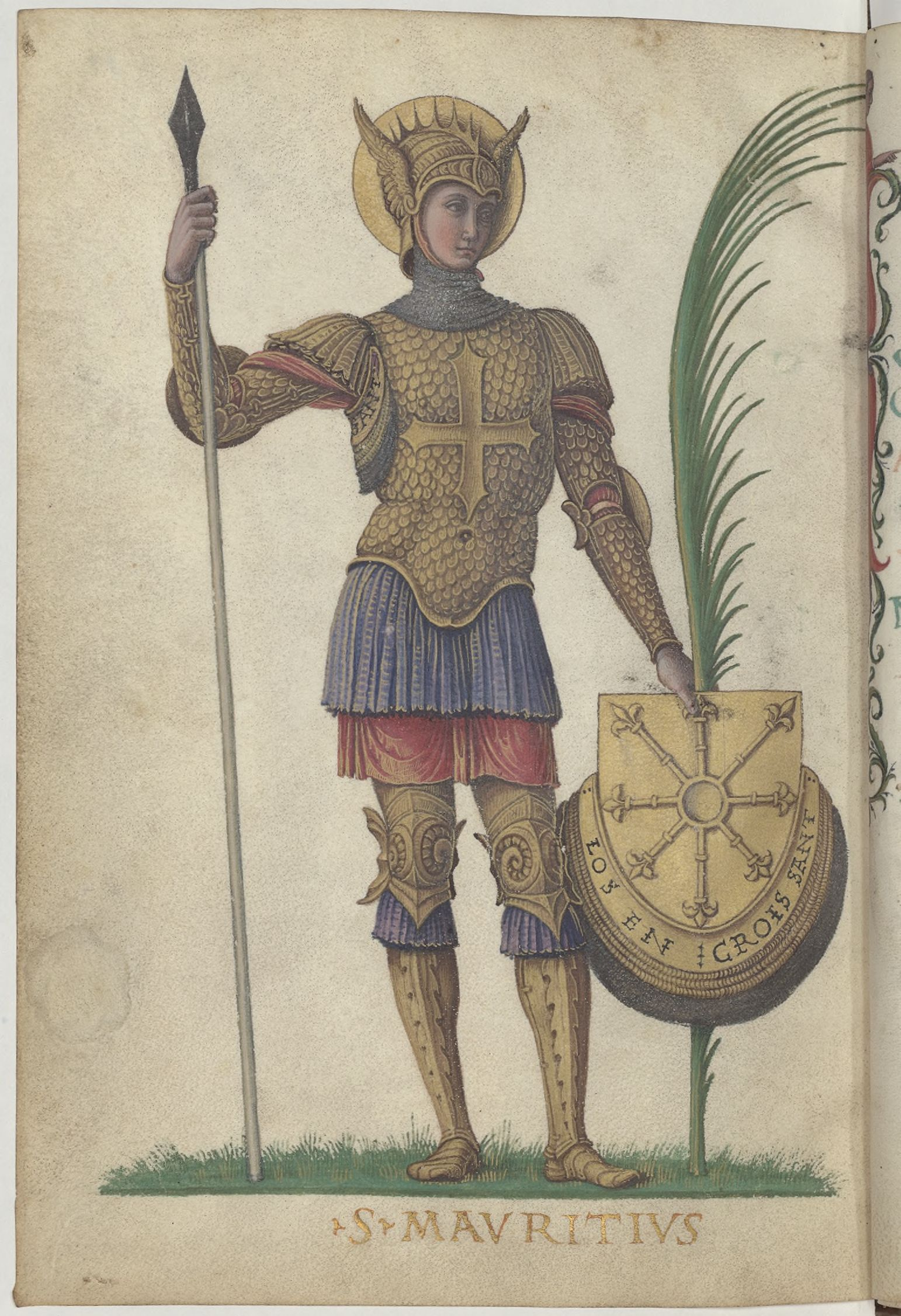
Saint Maurice, f.34v

The Martyrdom of Saint Maurice and his Comrades (Latin: Passio Mauricii et sotiorum ejus) is an illuminated manuscript commissioned as a diplomatic gift to Giovanni Cossa by the Venetian general Jacopo Antonio Marcello (1399–1464). The smallest miniatures are attributed to an unknown Lombard artist in the International Gothic style and the larger ones to Jacopo Bellini or Giovanni Bellini. It passed through several owners before in 1785 being acquired by the collection now known as the Bibliothèque de l'Arsenal in Paris.

== History ==
On 1 June 1453 Marcello sent the work to Cossa, seneschal of Provence and advisor to René of Anjou. René was then attempting to make good his hereditary claim to the Kingdom of Naples by making allies in Italy. As the Venetian Senate's "provveditore in the field", Marcello represented Venetian support for René and for this he was awarded the Ordre du Croissant, founded the previous year. He was invested in 1450 when Cossa held the annual role of "senatore dell'ordine". The alliance between Anjou and Venice was reversed when Francesco Sforza took power and Venice – finding itself at war with Milan, Florence and France – switched to backing Alfonso V of Aragon's claim to Naples.

Marcello tried to win René back over to the Venetian side and the initial text (ff. 1–5) addressed to Cossa and the knights of the Ordre du Croissant (a kind of covering letter of homage) makes excuses for being unable to be present at the Order's annual meeting and gives information of Venetian successes against Milan at Quinzano and Pontevico. It is followed by an account of Saint Maurice's martyrdom and the massacre of the Theban Legion (ff. 9–33v) then ended by a poem in hexameters dedicated to the saint (ff. 35–37 v).

The central account was written first and is illustrated by 11 illuminated initials and 7 miniature paintings showing events in the saint's life and death. A more modern Venetian artist was later commissioned to produce two richer illuminated initials (ff. 1r, 35r) and four full-page miniature paintings.

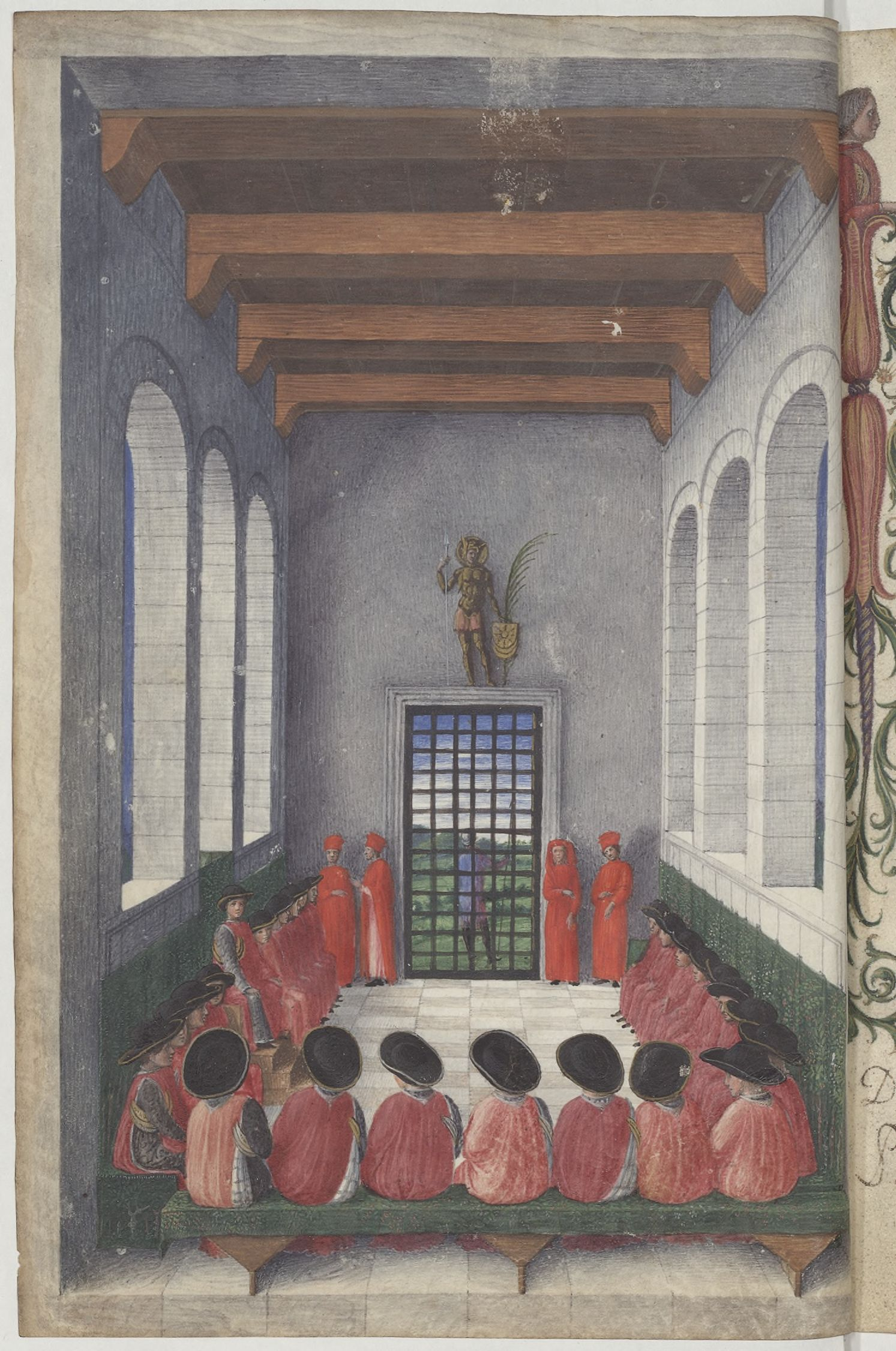
Assembly of the Ordre du Croissant, f. Cv

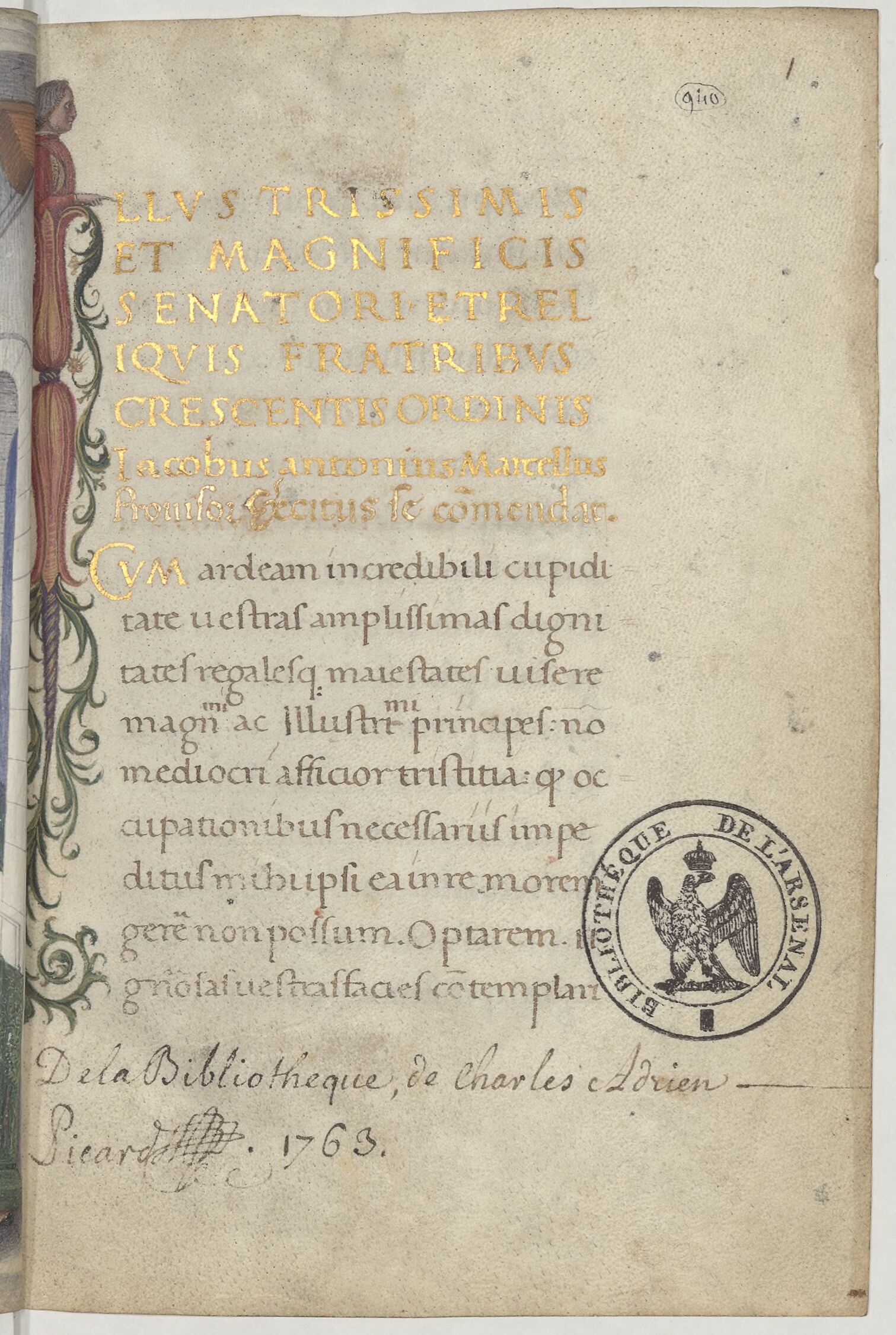
Start of Marcello's dedicatory letter, f. 1r

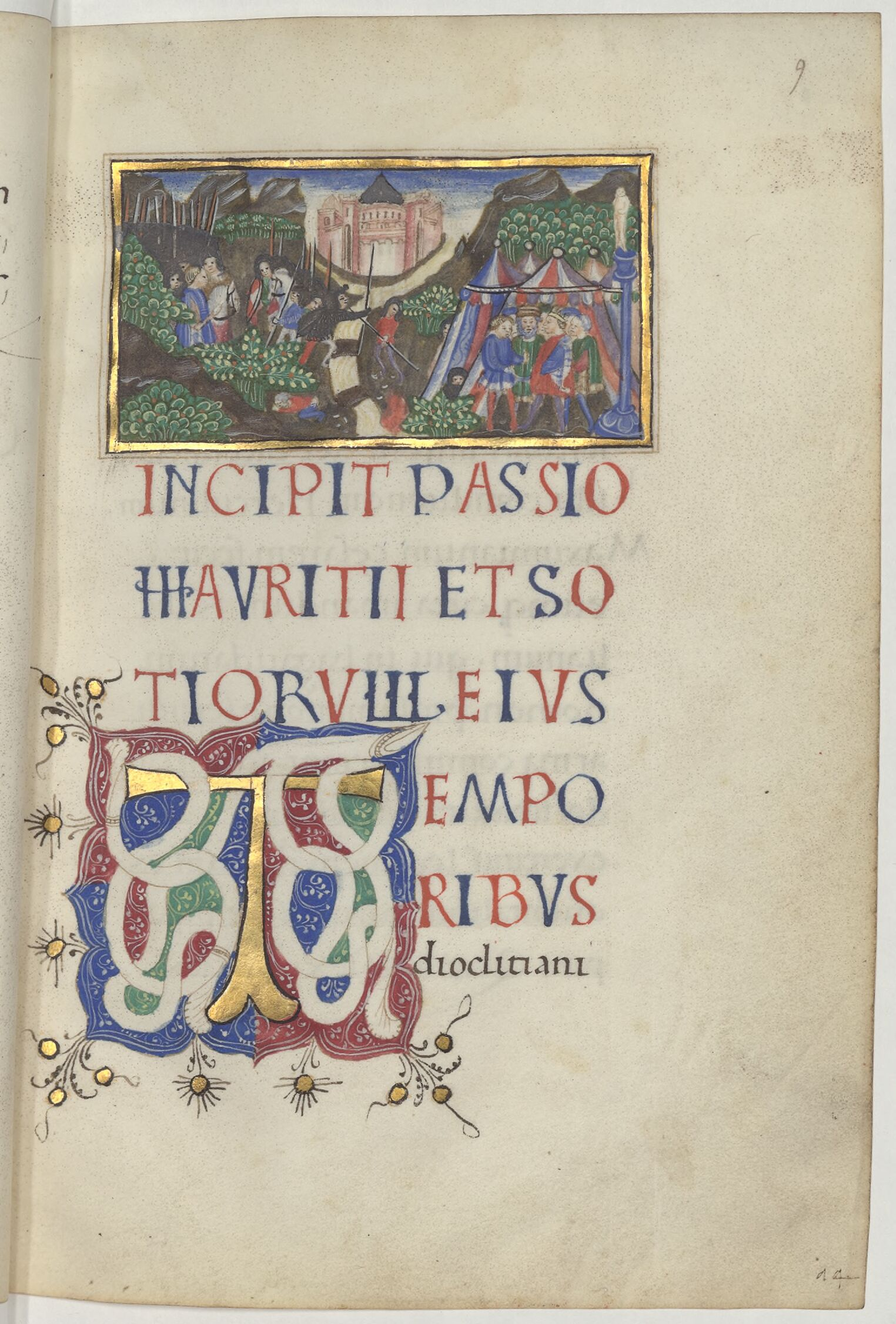
Start of the Passio, f. 9r

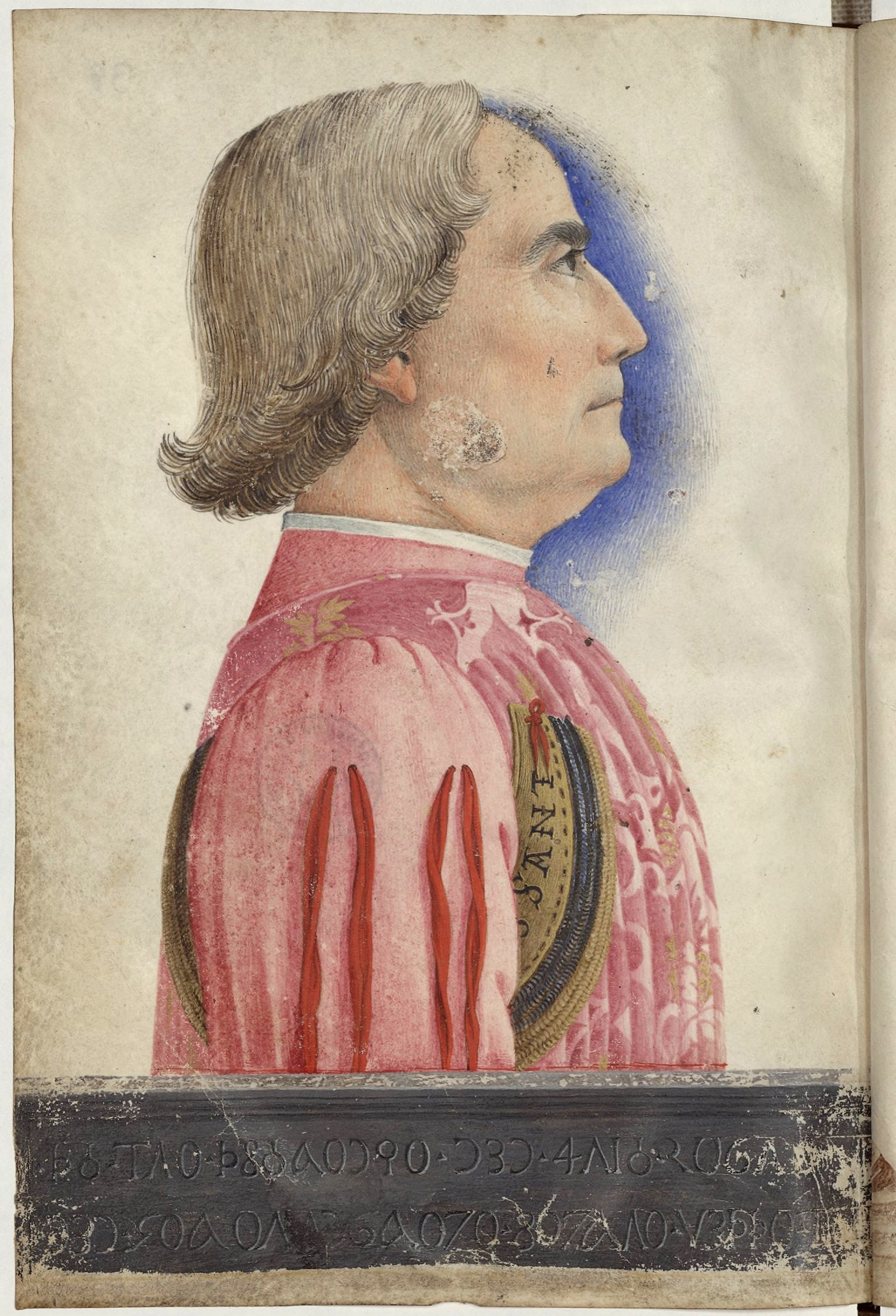
Portrait of Jacopo Antonio Marcello, f. 38v

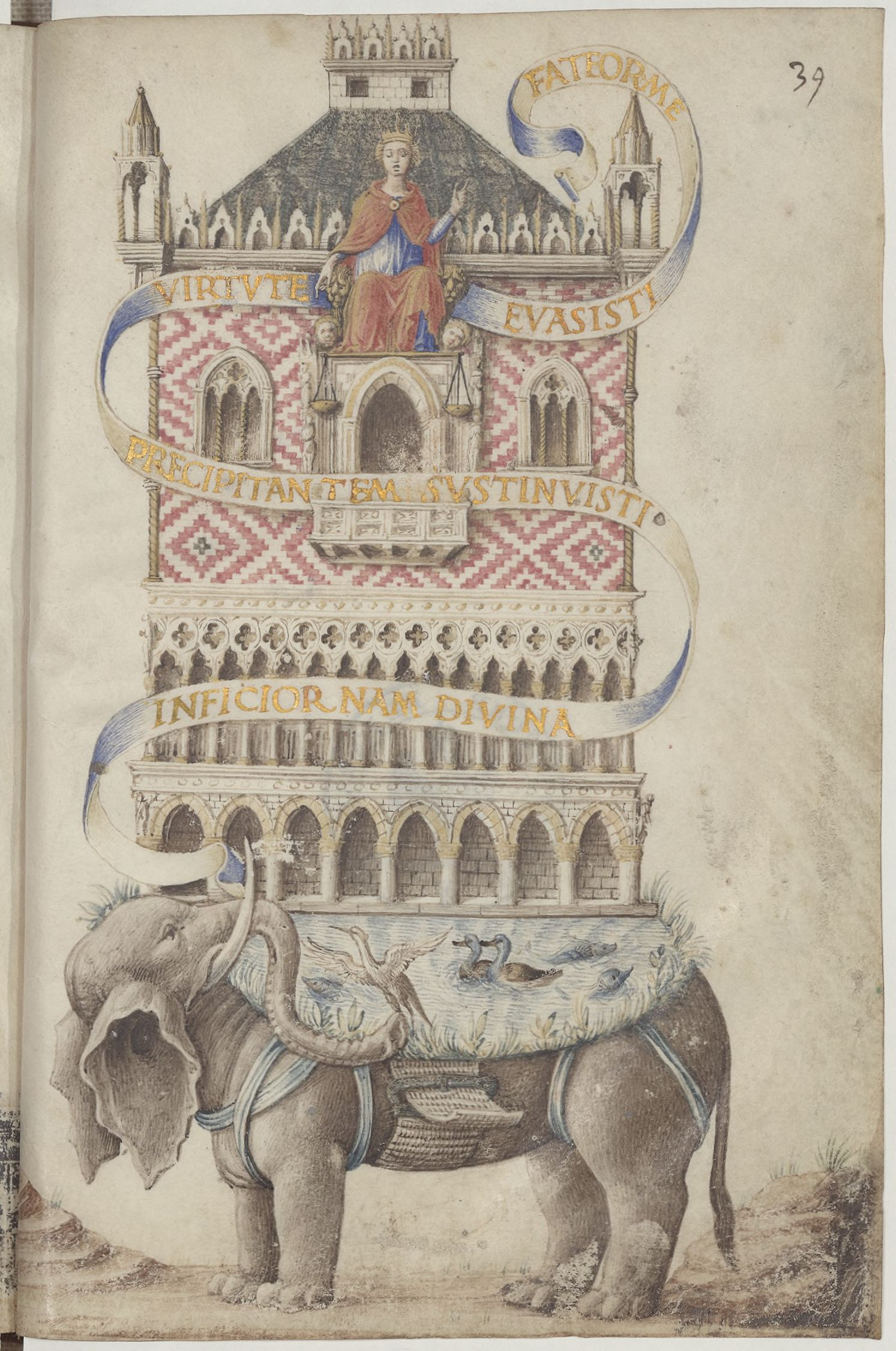
Allegory of Venice as the Palazzo Ducale on the back of an elephant, f. 39r

== Attribution ==
The first study to throw light on the four larger miniatures' quality was written by Millard Meiss and published in 1957. He attributed them to Andrea Mantegna, a theory still backed by some art historians. Another study in 1968 by Gil Robertson instead identified their artist as Giovanni Bellini. A third study in 1969 by Giordana Mariani Canova instead attributed them to Giovanni's father Jacopo, since he argued they were reminiscent of a Gothic style more reminiscent of him.

Canova's theory was decisively refuted by Luciano Bellosi, who found it impossible to believe that such innovative elements could be produced by an artist then at the end of his career and instead backed Robertson's theory of Giovanni, in which he was backed by Dominique Thiébaut. According to Thiébaut the miniatures show some similarities to early works by Giovanni such as his Pietas now in the Poldi Pezzoli and Brera collections in Milan. Nevertheless, the catalogue of the 2008 Mantegna exhibition states that most art historians still favour Jacopo as the works' artist, though a 2018 article by Antonio Mazzotta fully accepts the attribution to Giovanni and uses it to identify Giovanni's youthful collaborations in works attributed to Jacopo.

== Bibliography ==
- Marc-Édouard Gautier, ed. (2009). Splendeur de l'enluminure. Le roi René et les livres (in French). Ville d'Angers / Actes Sud. Angers/Arles: Marc-Édouard Gautier. ISBN 978-2-7427-8611-4.
- J. J. G. Alexander (1977). Manuscrits de la Renaissance italienne (in French). Paris: éditions du Chêne. ISBN 2-85108-140-3.
