= Siege of Trieste (1463) =

Date	July – 17 December 1463
Location	Trieste 45°39′1″N 13°46′13″E
Result	Siege failed
Territorial changes	Trieste cedes three castles to Venice

Belligerents
Republic of Venice	Imperial Free City of Trieste

Commanders and leaders
Antonio da Marsciano	Kaspar Melz

Strength
20,000	>500

The siege of Trieste that lasted from July to December 1463 was a brief war between the Republic of Venice and the Imperial Free City of Trieste. It was fought over trade restrictions favouring Trieste at the expense of Venice. It ended in a negotiated settlement, mediated by Pope Pius II, that allowed Trieste to retain its political status while conceding territory to Venice.

== Causes ==
Emperor Frederick III ordered that all goods being moved from Inner Austria and the Duchy of Carniola to Italy should pass through customs inspection in Trieste. Carniolan merchants circumvented this order by moving their product through Koper, which belonged to Venetian Istria. The Triestines petitioned the emperor to have the passes to Koper closed to merchants, whereupon the merchants appealed to Venice to intervene with the emperor. The Venetian response was not what the Carniolans had requested. Venice blockaded Trieste and sent Santo Gavardo to the border. They threatened to raze the city if the Carniolans were not granted free passage from Moccò to Koper.

In the midst of the crisis, the Venetian Senate sent a veteran soldier, Jacopo Antonio Marcello, to be lieutenant of Friuli, where he was in October 1462.

== Siege ==
The siege began in July 1463. The Venetian command was initially entrusted to Count Antonio da Marsciano, commander of a company of lanze spezzate known as the Società di San Marco and based in Verona. His provveditore in campo in charge of provisions was Vitale Lando. The besieging force consisted of 1,400 cavalry and 3,000–4,000 infantry. The infantry was commanded by Matteo Grifoni. Some 300 crossbowmen were sent from Torcello under the podestà Alvise Lando.

Trieste was defended by an Austrian army. On 14 August, Frederick III ordered Kaspar Melz, the custodian (Pfleger) of Višnja Gora, to assemble the estates of Carniola in Ljubljana on 14 September to prepare a response. On 30 August, the Venetian Senate ordered Carlo Fortebraccio to reinforce the besiegers with his own troops, the Bracceschi. On 24 September, they ordered Marcello to go to Trieste and await the arrival of Fortebraccio's troops. On 27 September, they gave Marcello full authority to negotiate with the Triestines. On 11 October, Venice offered a reward of 1,000 ducats to the first soldier over the walls. Such rewards were not unprecedented, but the value was unusually high.

At some point during the siege, Marsciano was wounded in the leg by a shot from a handgun. Lando was also wounded. He was replaced was as provveditore at Trieste by Marcello before 24 October. He had brought a force of 500 cavalry taken from the company of Bartolomeo Colleoni. From a hilltop position, he bombarded the city's walls and gates with heavy artillery. The Triestines regularly sallied to harass their attackers and to gather supplies. In one such encounter, the imperial forces suffered severe losses.

On 27 October, Frederick III ordered Kaspar to proceed to the relief of Trieste immediately, since the aid already given by the "prelates, nobles and cities" of Carniola had proven inadequate and the Venetians were strengthening their forces. Venice recalled Bartolemeo da Cremona from Bosnia to cast cannons for the siege. An imperial force of 500 troops, however, managed to enter Trieste with supplies. This and the outbreak of the Ottoman–Venetian War forced Venice to come to terms. By the end of the siege, there were 20,000 Venetian troops before the city.

Venice's simultaneous efforts to subdue Trieste and defeat the Ottomans in the Morea both ended in failure, with Venetian forces, funds and materiel stretched too thin.

== Peace terms ==
Pope Pius II, who had been bishop of Trieste in 1447–1450, intervened to mediate the conflict. A peace agreement was signed by Venice and Trieste on 17 December. Trieste's political status was unchanged. Venice, however, acquired the castles of Moccò, San Servolo and Castelnuovo, while Trieste was prohibited from exporting salt by sea. Trieste also agreed to pay compensation for losses suffered by Venice in the conflict.

== Literature ==
Marcello, the Venetian commander, was a literary man and several works connected to him were composed during the siege of Trieste. Before the walls of Trieste, Fortebraccio wrote or had written for him a letter of consolation on the death of Marcello's young son Valerio, De obitu Valerii filii consolatio, a contribution to a volume of humanist responses to Marcello's grief. Marcello's own response to his consolers, Excusatio adversus consolatores in obitu Valerii filii, defending his right to be unconsoled, was written for him by Giorgio Bevilacqua during the siege. It is dated 13 November before the walls of Trieste (although Bevilacqua was writing in Udine). Bevilacqua also wrote a letter in his own name praising Marcello's leadership at the siege.

Two longer works draw attention to the suffering of the townspeople during the siege. One is Michel Beheim's Von der statt Triest, a history of Trieste with an emphasis on the siege of 1463, for which he drew on the eyewitness testimony of one Veit Perl. It is primarily an epic and poetic work, however, and not historiography. The other is Raffaele Zovenzoni's Istrias.

Chierighino Chiericati, in his Trattatello della milizia (1471), criticizes the decline of the Venetian army since his time in it in the 1430s–1450s. He cites the failure of the siege of Trieste as a prime example, attributing it to poor morale, organization and generalship, especially of the lanze spezzate.

== Bibliography ==
- Classen, Albrecht (2020). "Review of Ogier 2018". Mediaevistik. 33: 581–582.
- Dimitz, August (2013) [1874]. History of Carniola from Ancient Times to the Year 1813 with Special Consideration of Cultural Development, Volume I: From Primeval Times to the Death of Emperor Frederick III (1493). Slovenian Genealogy Society International.
- Gullino, Giuseppe (2006). "Marcello, Jacopo Antonio". Dizionario Biografico degli Italiani (in Italian). Vol. 67: Macchi–Malaspina. Rome: Istituto dell'Enciclopedia Italiana. ISBN 978-88-12-00032-6.
- King, Margaret L. (1994). The Death of the Child Valerio Marcello. University of Chicago Press.
- King, Margaret L. (2005). "An Inconsolable Father and His Humanist Consolers: Jacopo Antonio Marcello, Venetian Nobleman, Patron, and Man of Letters". Humanism, Venice, and Women: Essays on the Italian Renaissance. Ashgate. pp. 221–246. Originally published in James Hankins, John Monfasani and Frederick Purnell Jr (eds.), Supplementum Festivum: Studies in Honor of Paul Oskar Kristeller (Binghamton, 1987).
- Luthar, Oto, ed. (2008). The Land Between: A History of Slovenia. Peter Lang.
- Mallett, M. E. (1976). "Some Notes on a Fifteenth-century Condottiere and His Library: Count Antonio da Marsciano". In Cecil H. Clough (ed.). Cultural Aspects of the Italian Renaissance: Essays in Honour of Paul Oskar Kristeller. Manchester University Press. pp. 202–215.
- Mallett, M. E. (1984). "Part I: c. 1400 to 1508". In M. E. Mallett; J. R. Hale (eds.). The Military Organisation of a Renaissance State: Venice, c. 1400 to 1617. Cambridge University Press. pp. 1–210.
- McDonald, William C. (1981). "Whose Bread I Eat": The Song-poetry of Michel Beheim. Kümmerle.
- Ogier, James, ed. (2018). Michel Beheim's History of Trieste, Von der statt Triest (ca. 1465). Kümmerle.
