= Giovanni Cossa =

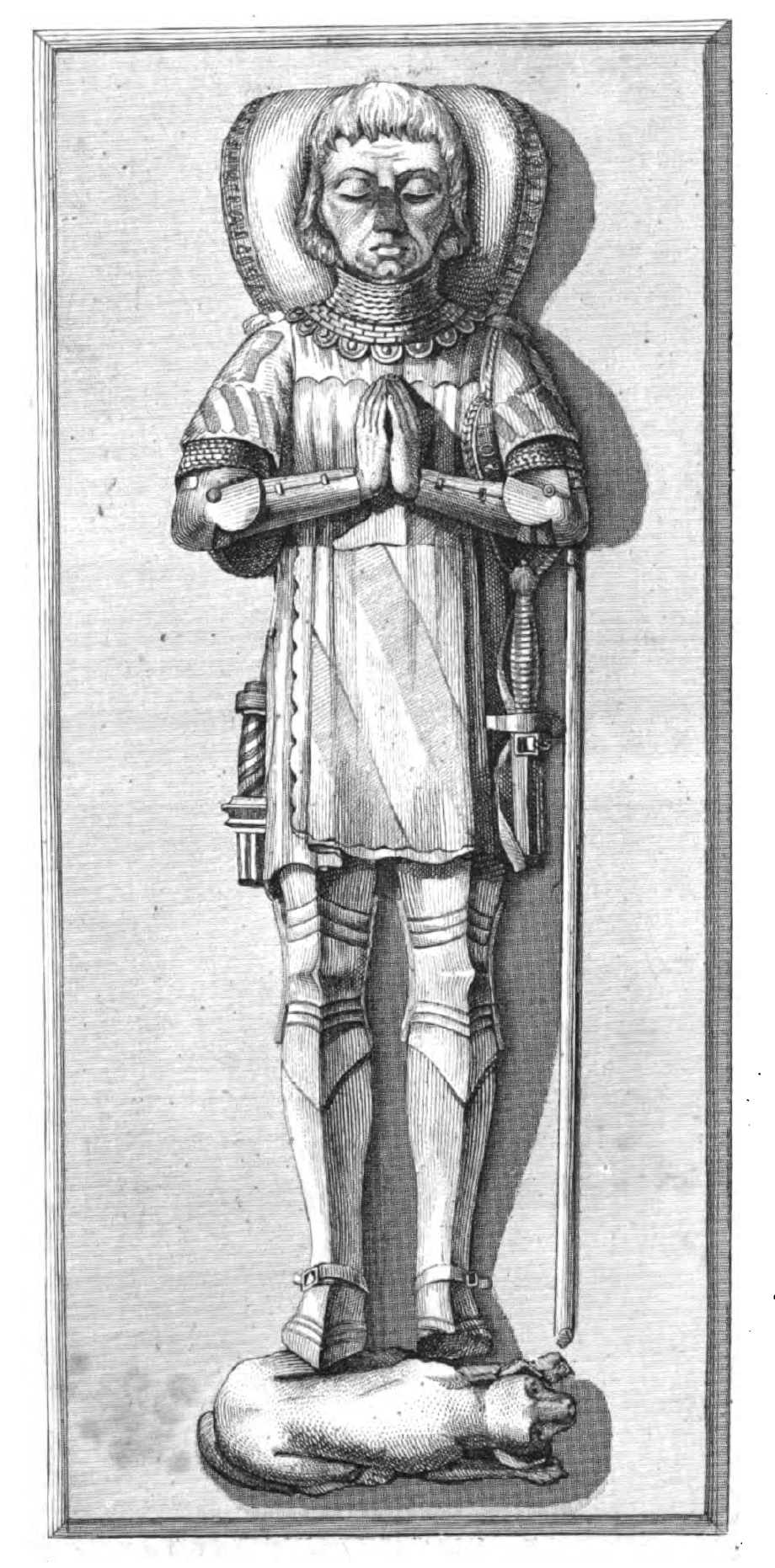
Cossa's tomb effigy in Église Sainte-Marthe in Tarascon, where he died.

Cossa's coat of arms

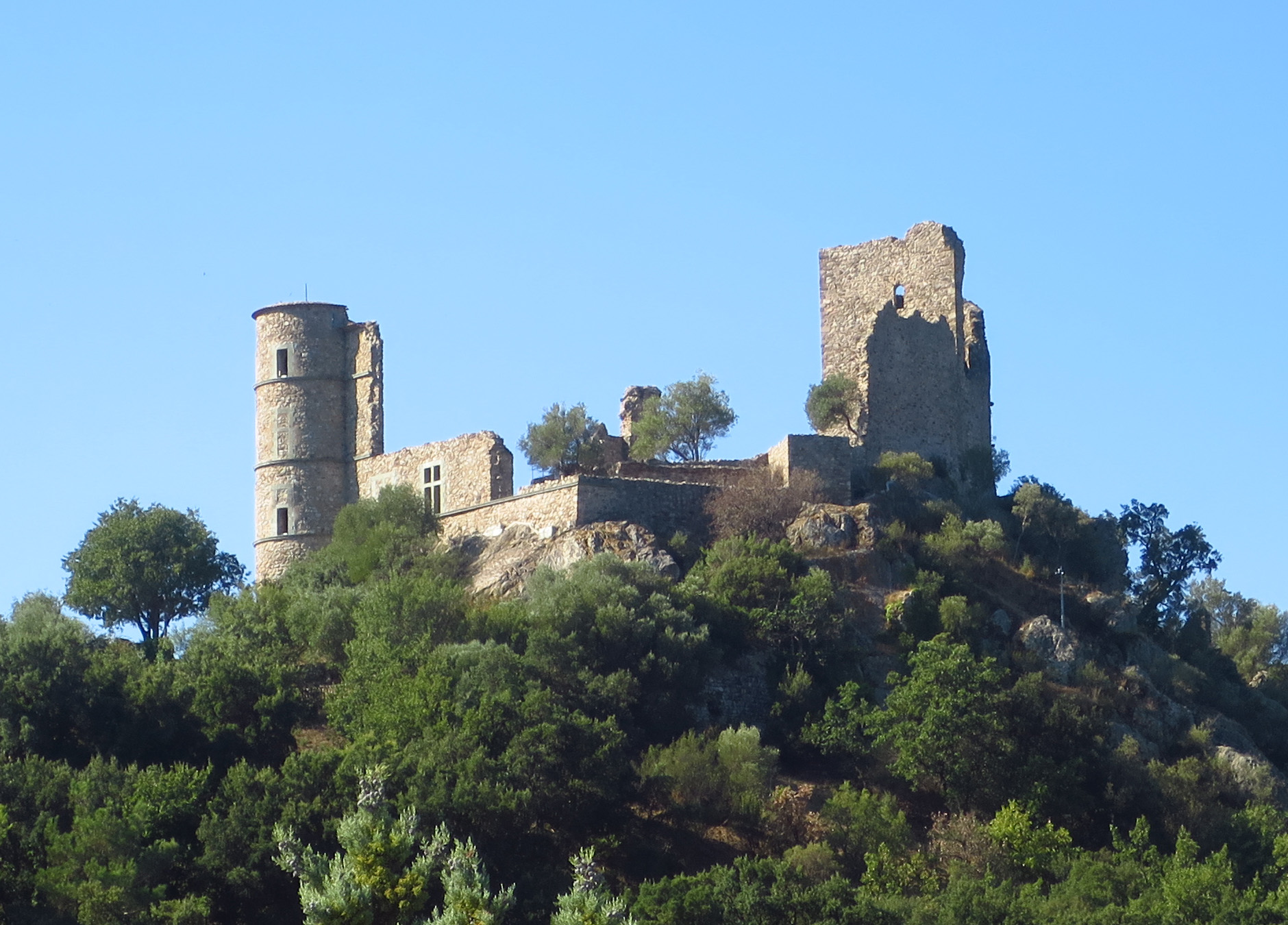
Grimaud Castle, owned by Cossa

Giovanni or Jean Cossa (probably 29 March 1400 – 30 October 1476) was lieutenant general of Provence, seneschal of Rene of Anjou and grand seneschal of Provence.

== See also ==
- Martyrdom of Saint Maurice and his Comrades

== Bibliography ==
- (in French) Jean Favier (2008). Le roi René. Fayard. p. 742. ISBN 978-2-213-63480-7.
- Franca Petrucci (1984). "Cossa, Giovanni". Dizionario Biografico degli Italiani (in Italian). Vol. 30: Cosattini–Crispolto. Rome: Istituto dell'Enciclopedia Italiana. ISBN 978-88-12-00032-6.
