= Bibliothèque de l'Arsenal =

Library in Paris

Coordinates: 48°51′01″N 2°21′48.70″E

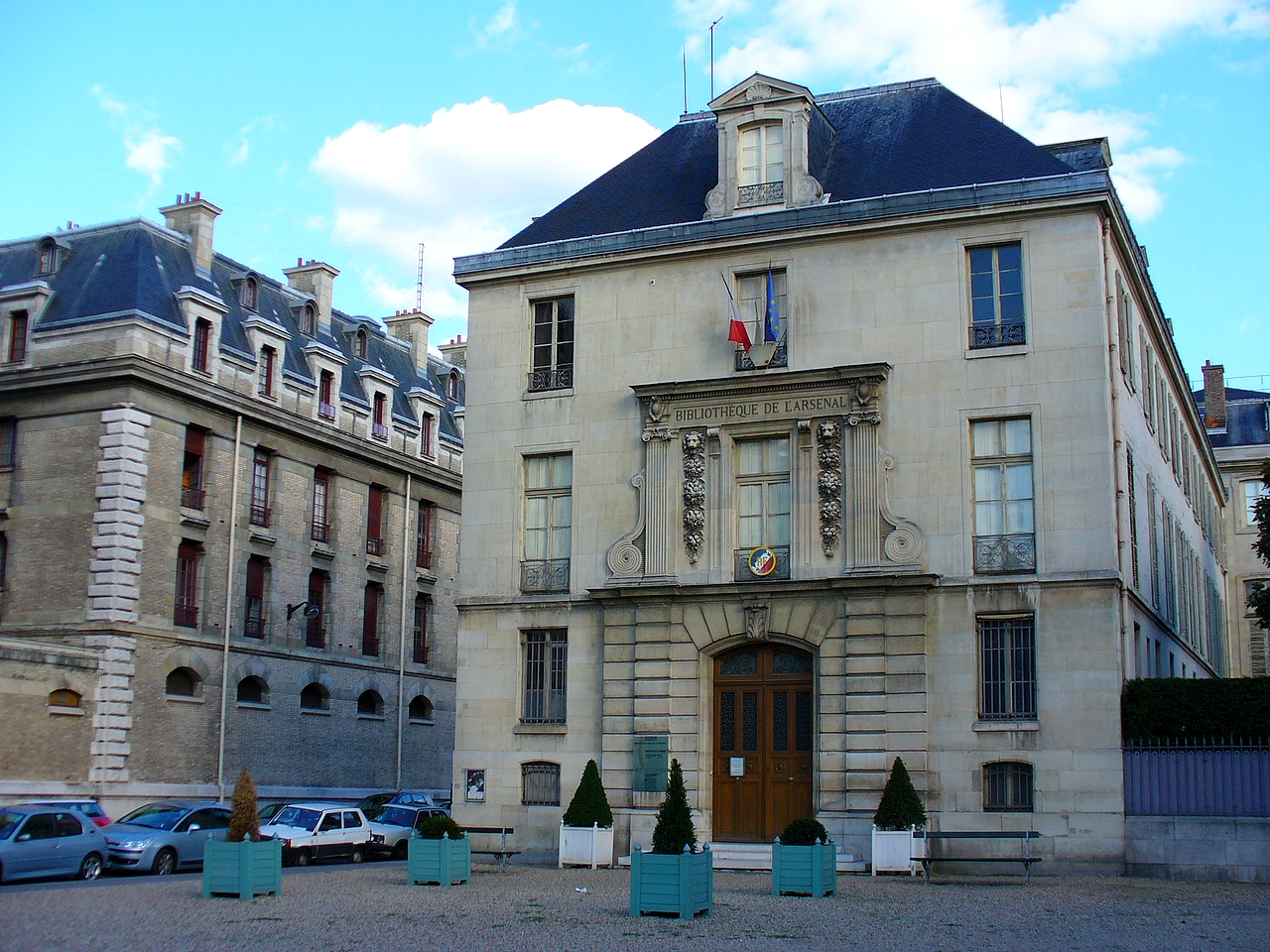
Entrance to the Bibliothèque de l'Arsenal

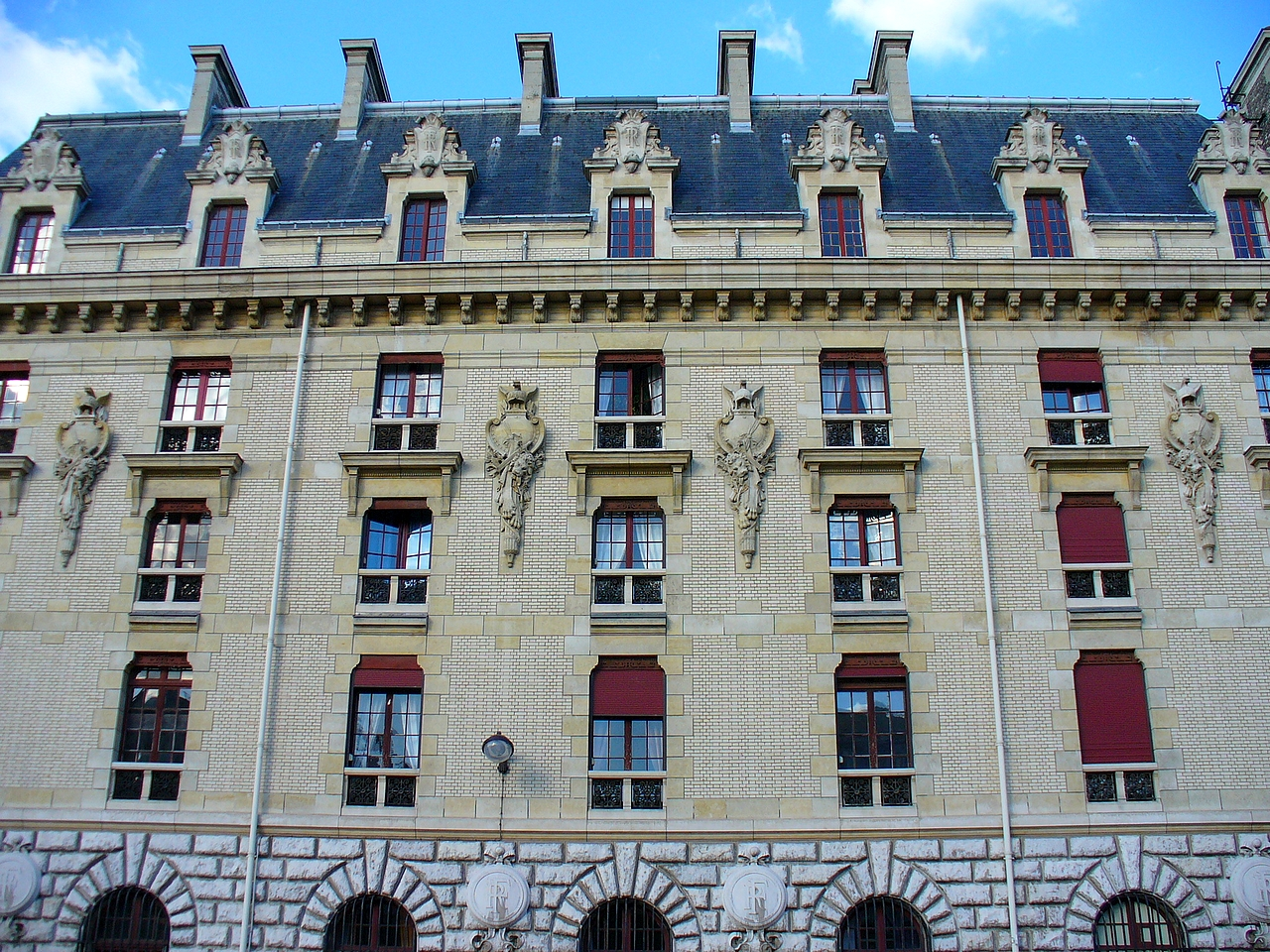
Caserne des Célestins going along the building

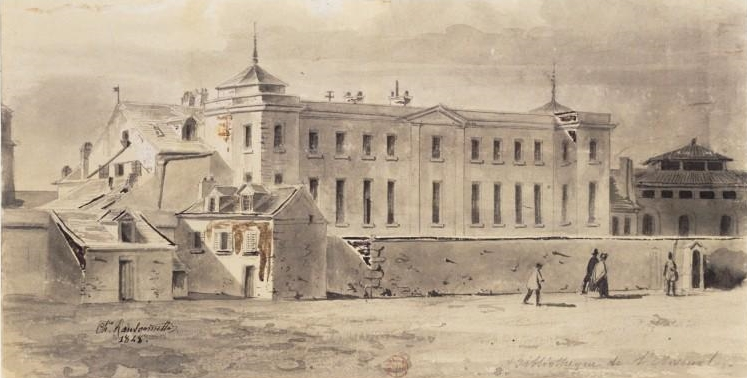
Bibliothèque de l'Arsenal seen from the boulevard Morland, drawing by Charles Ransonnette (1848)

The Bibliothèque de l'Arsenal (French pronunciation: [biblijɔtɛk də laʁsənal], Library of the Arsenal, founded 1757) in Paris has been part of the Bibliothèque nationale de France since 1934.

== History ==
The collections of the library originated with the private library of Marc-René, 3rd marquis d'Argenson (1722–1787), installed in 1757 in the residence of the Grand Master of the Artillery, at the heart of the ancient Arsenal of Paris. The Arsenal itself was founded by King François I in the 16th century, later rebuilt by Sully, and expanded by the architect Germain Boffrand in the 18th century. Paulmy had assembled a magnificent collection, particularly rich in medieval manuscripts and prints. In 1786 he also acquired the collection of the duc de la Vallière, but then sold the entire library to the comte d'Artois.

The library was sequestered by the state during the French Revolution, and was greatly expanded by many valuable items seized from the abbeys of Paris and also by the archives of the Bastille. On 28 April 1797 it was declared a public library.

In 1824, the writer Charles Nodier became librarian and held in the Arsenal some the most reputable literary salons of the day. In the 19th century the collections became increasingly focused towards literature, especially drama. Between 1880 and 1914 the library acquired a copy of every periodical published in Paris. In 1934 it became a department of the Bibliothèque nationale.

The library was once known as the Library of Monsieur, and Balzac was once a reader there; in the early 20th century it was still accommodated in the former residence of the Grand Master.

== The library today ==
The library today holds approximately one million volumes (including 150,000 pre-1880 volumes), just over 12,000 manuscripts such as the Martyrdom of Saint Maurice and his Comrades, 100,000 prints, and 3,000 charts and plans. Its collecting policy concentrates on French literature from the 16th century to the 19th century, publications connected with the archives and manuscript collections (fonds) already held, bibliophilia, the history of the book and bookbinding, and the history of the Arsenal itself and its occupants.

== Major collections ==
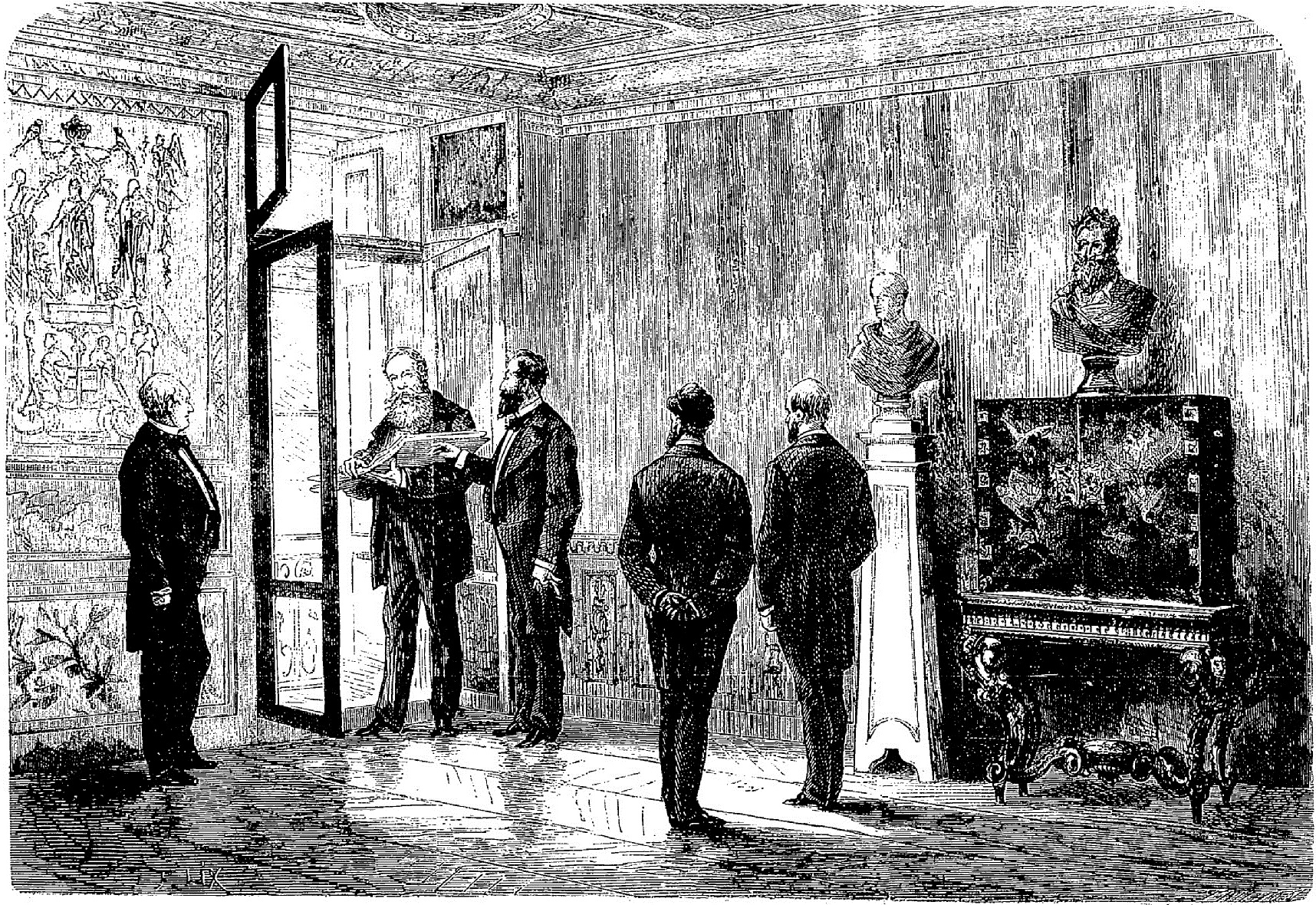
D. Pedro II, Emperor of Brazil, visiting the Bibliothèque de l'Arsenal (L'Univers illustré, Levy (Paris), nº 879, 27/01/1872)

- Archives of the Bastille: The archives of the Bastille date from 1660 onwards. They comprise prisoner dossiers (including those of the marquis de Sade and other famous prisoners), the archives of the Lieutenancy of Police of Paris, the Chambre de l'Arsenal and the Chambre du Châtelet, private papers of the officers of the Bastille, and a portion of the papers of the royal family.
- Fonds Prosper Enfantin: Paul-Mathieu Laurent, known as Laurent de l'Ardèche, was a disciple of the Saint-Simonist Prosper Enfantin and librarian of the Arsenal. In 1865, he acquired the papers of Enfantin, which are a rich source for the history of Saint-Simonism.
- Fonds Lambert: In 1969, Pierre Lambert, a bookseller who had devoted his life to collecting items connected with the writer Joris-Karl Huysmans, bequeathed his collection to the library. It includes manuscripts, letters, works that belonged to Huysmans, and original editions of his works.
- Louis-Sébastien Mercier Papers: In 1967, the library acquired the papers of Louis-Sébastien Mercier (1740–1814), who had had a great influence on the evolution of the theatre and in particular on realistic drama, and who is particularly known for his descriptions of Paris. The collection contains biographical documents and correspondence, articles, notes, the manuscripts of Nouveau Paris and his plays and works of poetry and philosophy.
- Fonds Lacroix: Paul Lacroix, known as Bibliophile Jacob, worked at the Arsenal for several years. After his death in 1884 the library acquired most of his personal papers, including his collection of autographs, contained in letters from writers, musicians and philosophers, both contemporary with Lacroix and older.
- Fonds Péladan: In 1936, the Arsenal acquired all the papers of Joséphin Péladan (1858–1918), a spiritualist writer who was fascinated by the occult and in 1891 founded his own church.
- José-Maria de Heredia Collection: The daughters of the poet José-Maria de Heredia, who was librarian of the Arsenal from 1901 until his death in 1905, gave the library a collection of portraits, manuscripts, works and letters concerning their father and themselves. One of them, Marie de Régnier (whose pen name was Gerard d'Houville), bequeathed her library to the Arsenal. The library is also very rich in items connected with the writer Pierre Louÿs, Heredia's son-in-law.
- Fonds Georges Douay: Georges Douay, Parisian man-about-town, theatre fan, and composer of songs and operettas, assembled a collection (mainly printed) on French theatre from the 16th century to the beginning of the 20th century, which he bequeathed to the Arsenal in 1919.
- Archives Parlementaires: The official, printed record of the French National Assembly from the 1789 Revolution forward.
- Prints: The print collection comprises portraits, many caricatures of the Revolution and the Restoration, a topographic series of plans and views of cities, and major series of the 18th century Italian, German and English schools bought by Paulmy during his travels throughout Europe.
- Charts and Plans: Paulmy acquired a magnificent series of military reconnaissance plans that had been made for his uncle, the comte d'Argenson, who was Minister of War.
- Music: The Arsenal's collection of manuscript and printed music almost exclusively comes from the 18th century, except for a few medieval manuscripts. Most of the music collection was assembled by Paulmy.

The library is also rich in occult documents. These include the original manuscripts of The Sacred Magic of Abra-Melin, Book of the Penitence of Adam and the Grimoire of Armadel.

== See also ==
- List of libraries in France
