= Pietà (Bellini, Milan) =

1455–1460 painting by Giovanni Bellini

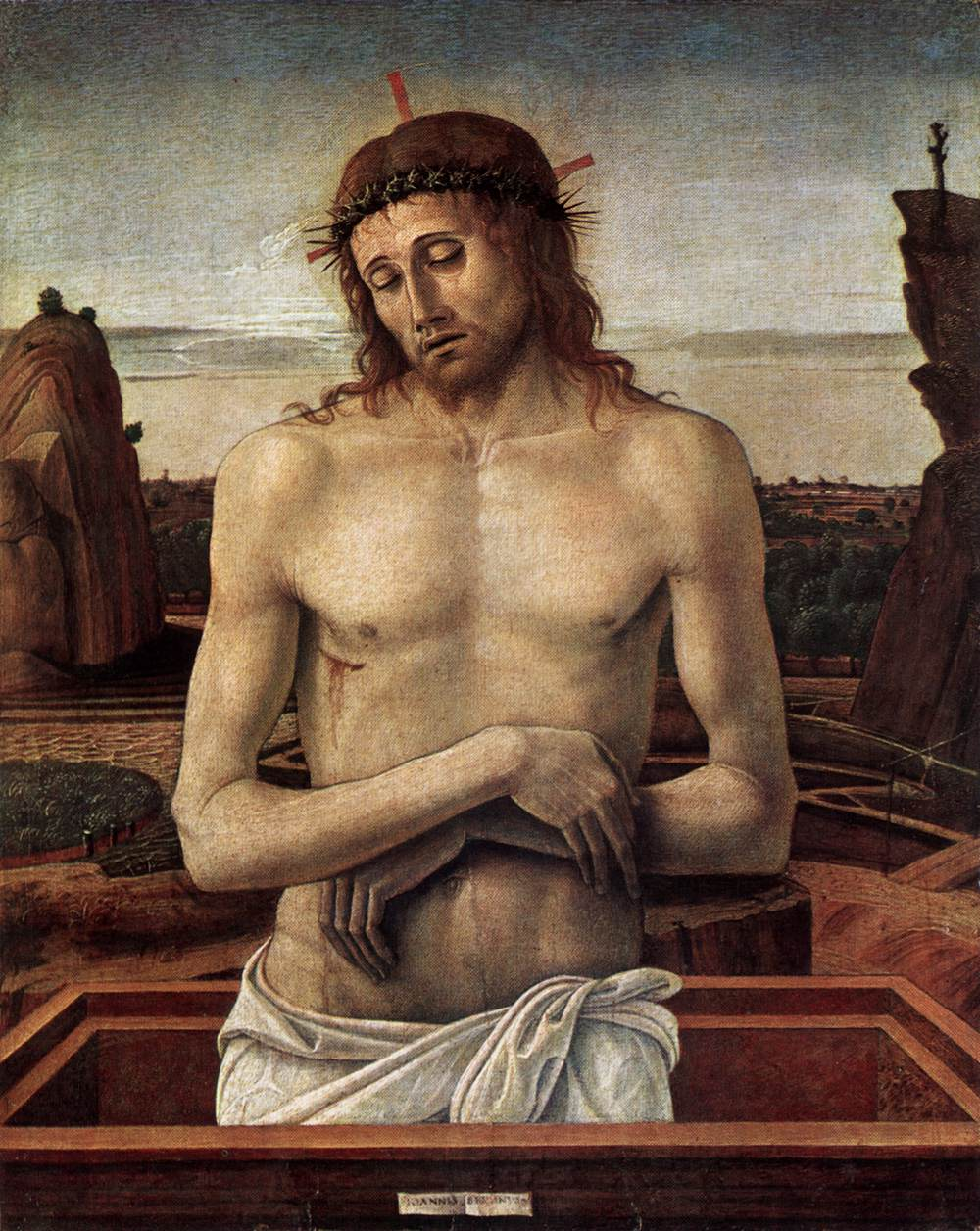
- Artist: Giovanni Bellini
- Year: 1455–1460
- Medium: tempera on panel
- Dimensions: 48 cm × 38 cm (19 in × 15 in)
- Location: Museo Poldi Pezzoli, Milan

Pietà is a painting in tempera on panel, executed c. 1455–1460 by the Italian Renaissance artist Giovanni Bellini, now in the Museo Poldi Pezzoli in Milan. One of his earliest works, it is the prototype for his long series of other Pietas such as Pietà (Bergamo).

== See also ==
- List of works by Giovanni Bellini

== Bibliography ==
- Mariolina Olivari, Giovanni Bellini, in AA.VV., Pittori del Rinascimento, Scala, Firenze 2007. ISBN 888117099X
