= Ordre du Croissant =

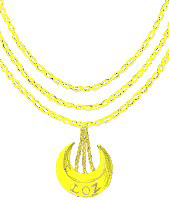
Collar of the Ordre du Croissant

The Ordre du Croissant (Order of the Crescent; Italian: Ordine della Luna Crescente) was a chivalric order founded by Charles I of Naples and Sicily in 1268. It was revived in 1448 or 1464 by René I, king of Jerusalem, Sicily and Aragon (including parts of Provence), to provide him with a rival to the English Order of the Garter. René was one of the champions of the medieval system of chivalry and knighthood, and this new order was (like its English rival) neo-Arthurian in character. Its insignia consisted of a golden crescent moon engraved in grey with the word LOZ, with a chain of 3 gold loops above the crescent. On René's death, the Order lapsed.

== Provence ==
The Order of the Crescent, also known as "Order of the Crescent in the Provence", a French chivalric order was founded on 11 August 1448 in Angers by King Rene of Provence as a court order. The order, which united itself, features from knighthood and spiritual orders, and counted up to 50 knights, of which can be dukes, princes, marquises, viscounts and knights with four quarters of nobility.

The Knights committed themselves to mutual assistance and loyalty to the order which, after the Provence became part of France in 1486, was soon forgotten.

Ackermann mentions this knighthood as a historical order of France.

== In later culture ==
- René and his Order of the Crescent were adopted as "historical founders" by the Lambda Chi Alpha fraternity in 1912, as exemplars of chivalry and Christian charity. Ceremonies of the Order of the Crescent were referenced in formulating ceremonies for the fraternity.
- The Order was neo-Arthurian in character, and so has been used to link René with the Holy Grail and the fictitious Priory of Sion.

== Sources ==
- Gustav Adolph Ackermann, " Ordensbuch, Sämtlicher in Europa blühender und erloschener Orden und Ehrenzeichen ". Annaberg, 1855, p 208 - Google Books (Former orders of France : p. 205-214)
