= Historical orders, decorations, and medals of France =

This page is a list of the orders of chivalry and orders of merit awarded by France, in the order they were established or incorporated in France, and their origins.

== Kingdom of the Franks, Merovingian and Carolingian periods (485–987) ==
- Order of Saint Remigius 485 (probably a legend)
- Order of the Rooster and the Dog 496 (probably a legend)
- Order of the Oak 723 (probably a legend)

== Kingdom of France, Capetian period (987–1328) ==
- Order of the Lion 1080
- Order of Saint Lazarus 1099
- Order of the Temple, also known as the Templars, set up in Jerusalem by 7 French knights in 1118. The Order had its headquarters in Paris but was so spread across Europe it cannot be accounted a solely French order
- Order of Our Dear Lady of the Poor of Aubrac 1120
- Order of the Holy Ghost 1198
- Order of the Faith and Peace 1229
- Militia of the Faith of Jesus Christ (first half of the 13th century)
- Order of the Broom-cod 1234

== Kingdom of France, Valois period (1328–1589) ==
- Order of Saint Lazarus 1099
- Order of the Star, also known as the Order of Our Lady of the Noble House 1351
- Order of the Golden Shield (= Order of the Green Shield) - Duke of Bourbon 1369
- Order of Our Lady of the Thistle - Duke of Bourbon 1370
- Order of the Crown - Lord of Coucy 1378
- Order of the Ermine - Duchy of Brittany 1381
- Order of the Belt of Hope 1389
- Noble Order of Saint George of Rougemont - Duchy of Burgundy 1390
- Order of the Porcupine - Duke of Orleans (Valois-Orleans) 1394
- Order of the Passion of Christ 1400
- Order of the White Lady = Emprise de l'Escu vert à la Dame Blanche - Marshal Boucicaut round 1398-1400
- Order of the Hop - Dukes of Burgundy round 1400
- Order of the Golden Chains - Duke of Bourbon 1414
- Order of the Greyhound (Order of the Faithfulness) Duchy of Bar 1416 = Order of Hubert - 1423
- Order of the Golden Fleece - Dukes of Burgundy - 1430
- Order of the Crescent - Counts of Provence - 1448
- Order of Saint Michael - 1469
- Order of the Ladies of the Cord 1498
- Order of the Holy Spirit (1578)
- Order of the Christian Charity 1589

== Kingdom of France, Bourbon period (1589–1793) ==
- Order of Saint Lazarus 1099
- Order of Saint Michael (1469)
- Order of the Holy Spirit (1578)
- Order of the Yellow Ribbon 1600
- Order of Our Lady of Mount Carmel (1606)
- United Order of Our Lady of Mount Carmel and Saint Lazarus 1608
- Order of the Knights Bannerets 1609
- Order of Saint Magdalene 1614
- Order of the Annunciation 1619
- Order of the Celestial Blue Ribbon of the Holy Rosary 1645
- Royal and Military Order of Saint Louis (1693)
- Order of the Bee 1703
- Order of the Terrace 1716
- Order of the Banner 1723
- Order of Military Merit also Institution du Military Merit (1759)
- Order of the Rose 1780

On January 1, 1791, the Order of Saint Louis and the Order of Military Merit were merged into the Military Decoration (French: Décoration militaire) by the Convention, the revolutionary parliament.

== French First Republic (1793–1804) ==
Revolutionary France abolished all chivalric orders of the monarchy in 1793. There were nevertheless decorations such as medals and Weapons of Honour.

=== Consulate of Napoleon Bonaparte (1800–1804) ===
- The Legion of Honour was not, strictly speaking, a chivalric order at the time of its institution, since Napoleon did not like knighthood orders and the Legion of Honour had to be a "real" legion with legionaries, officers and commanders. Nevertheless, at the time of its institution, the Legion of Honour had all the hallmarks of a chivalric order except the name.

== French First Empire (1804–1814, 1815) ==
- Order of the Iron Crown (1805) an award attributed to the Kingdom of Italy, which was in a Personal Union with the French Empire.
- Order of the Three Golden Fleeces (1809)
- Order of the Reunion (1811) inherited from the Kingdom of Holland after its annexation by France.

== Kingdom of France, Bourbon Restoration (1814, 1815–1830) ==
- Order of Saint Michael (1469)
- Order of the Holy Spirit (1578)
- United Order of Our Lady of Mount Carmel and Saint Lazarus 1608
- Royal and Military Order of Saint Louis (1693)
- Order of the Academic Palms (1808)
- Order of the Saint Sepulchre in Jerusalem (1814)
- Décoration du Lys 1814
- Decoration of the Armband of Bordeaux (French: "Décoration du Brassard de Bordeaux" 1814)
- Legion of Honour (from 1815 also a formal knighthood order but no more the first of French decorations.)
- Hunting Order of St. Hubert (1815)
- Décoration de la Fidélité (1816)

== Kingdom of France, July Monarchy (1830–1848) ==
- Legion of Honour from 1830 the first in rank among French decorations and knighthood orders.
- Order of the Cross of July, (French: "Ordre de la Croix de Juillet"), established in 1830 by the "Bourgeois King" Louis Philippe I.

== French Second Republic (1848–1852) ==
- Legion of Honour 1802

== French Second Empire (1852–1870) ==
- Legion of Honour 1802
- Order of the Public Instruction (French:"Ordre l’Instruction Publique") 1866

== French Third Republic (1870–1945) ==
- Legion of Honour 1802
- Order of the Public Instruction 1866

The French Republic possessed in Asia, Africa and America a large colonial empire. For the purposes of this huge area, a number of "Colonial orders of knighthood" were established or incorporated.

They were :

- Royal Order of Cambodia (French:"Ordre Royal du Cambodge" (1864)
- Order of the Star of Anjouan (French:"Ordre de l'Étoile d'Anjouan" (1874)
- Order of the Dragon of Annam (French:"Ordre du Dragon d'Annam" (1886)
- Order of Nichan El-Anouar (French:"Ordre du Nichan El-Anouar" (1887)
- Order of the Black Star (French:"Ordre de l'Étoile Noire" (1889)

In addition, the Governor-General of French Indo-China established in 1900 :

- Order of the Merit of Indochina (French:Ordre du Mérite Indochinois").

France had also not enough in the fatherland with the Legion of Honor. The various ministries therefore proposed that they themselves managed and issued orders to:

- National Order of Agricultural Merit (French: "l'Ordre du Mérite Agricole") 1883
- Order of Maritime Merit (French:"Ordre du Mérite Maritime") 1930
- Order of the Social Merit (French:"Ordre du Mérite social") 1936
- Order of Public Health (French:"Ordre de la Santé publique") 1938
- Orde of the Commercial Merit (French:"Ordre du Mérite commercial") (1939)
  which was renamed in 1961 "Order of the Commercial and Industrial Merit".

In 1940, a French government was formed in exile . They suggested a knighthood order as:

- Order of Liberation established in 1940 by Charles de Gaulle in London.

The France-remaining government of Marshal Philippe Pétain, the so-called "Vichy government", proposed 2 knighthood orders:

- National Order of Labour (French: "Ordre National Du Travail" 1942
- Order of the Francisque (French: "Ordre de la francisque") 1941

== French Fourth Republic (1945–1958) ==
The Fourth Republic knew a very large quantity of knighthood orders and decorations. There were in 1945 16 knighthood orders. The traditional position of the Legion of Honour as highest and most prominent award remained formally intact but the French ministers founded for use in homeland and overseas no less than 11 new orders.

- Legion of Honour 1802
- Order of Liberation 1940

The French ministries kept on establishing Ministerial Orders so there were finally 19 :

- Order of the Public Instruction (Ordre de l’Instruction Publique), 1866; renamed in 1955 to Ordre des Palmes Académiques (Order of the Academic Palms)
- Order of Agricultural Merit (l'Ordre du Mérite Agricole) 1883
- Order of Maritime Merit (Ordre du Mérite Maritime) 1930
- Order of the Social Merit (Ordre du Mérite social) 1936
- Order of Public Health (Ordre de la Santé publique) 1938
- Order of the Commercial Merit (Ordre du Mérite commercial) 1939
- Order of the Artisanal Merit (Ordre du Mérite artisanal) 1948
- Order of the Touristic Merit (Ordre du Mérite touristique) 1949
- Order of the Postal Merit (France) (Ordre du Mérite postal) 1953
- Order of the Warrior Merit (Ordre du Mérite combattant) 1953
- Order of National Economy (Ordre de l'Economie nationale) 1954
- Order of the Sportive Merit (Ordre du Mérite sportif) 1956
- Order of the Labour Merit (Ordre du Mérite du Travail) 1957
- Order of the Military Merit (Ordre du Mérite militaire) 1957
- Order of the Civil Merit (Ordre du Mérite civil) 1957
- Order of Arts and Letters (Ordre des Arts et des Lettres) 1957
- Order of the Saharian Merit (Ordre du Mérite saharien) 1958

The French Republic knew following a decree of 1 September 1950 two "Orders of Overseas France" (Ordres de la France d'Outre-mer) :

- Order of the Black Star 1889
- Order of the Star of Anjouan 1874

The two Orders were a heritage of the colonial time during which the decorations of the colonized states such as Dahomey and the Comores were included in the French orders system. The French government awarded the Order of the Black Star in Europe until 1 January 1964. The decolonisation and restructuring of the French colonial empire, one speaks now of the "French Union", made necessary other adaptations in the French knighthood orders.

Three other colonial Orders incorporated in it since 1896, namely the Royal Order of Cambodia (Cambodja), the Order of the Dragon of Annam (Vietnam) and the Order of Nichan El-Anouar (Somaliland) became therefore on 1 September 1950 "Orders of Associated States of the French Union" (Ordres des États Associés de l'Union Française). The French government didn't award these honors themselves anymore. In 1963 the granting of the two French Overseas Orders were also discontinued. In their place, the new "National Order of Merit" was awarded. This Order replaced fifteen of the ministerial orders so that a much clearer decoration policy became possible.

== French Fifth Republic (1958–present) ==
- Legion of Honour 1802
- Order of Liberation 1940

The 19 Ministerial Orders - which all knew three grades Commander, Officer and Knight - were each administered by a Board which was chaired by the relevant Minister. The fragmentation of the honors system was perceived as malpractice because a clear policy was not possible.
Fifteen of these orders were abolished by the first president of the Fifth Republic, Charles de Gaulle on 1 January 1964 and were replaced by the National Order of Merit but the three following were kept:

- Order of the Academic Palms (1808 or 1955)
- National Order of Agricultural Merit (French: "l'Ordre National du Mérite Agricole")
- Order of Maritime Merit (French: "l'Ordre du Mérite Maritime")

The Order of Arts and Letters (French: "Ordre des Arts et des Lettres"), established in 1956, was also maintained.

A new development is that on 5 June 1996, the Order of Tahiti Nui (French: "l'Ordre de Tahiti Nui") was established by the Assembly of French Polynesia (French: "Assemblée de Polynésie française"), the local French Polynesian parliamentary assembly.

== See also ==
- Orders, decorations, and medals of France

== Sources ==
- Gustav Adolph Ackermann, Ordensbuch, Sämtlicher in Europa blühender und erloschener Orden und Ehrenzeichen. Annaberg, 1855 - Google Books (Former orders of France : p. 205-214)
