= Order of the Belt of Hope =

Knighthood order founded in 1389

The Order of the Belt of Hope (German: Orden des Gürtels der Hoffnung) was a knighthood order which was founded in 1389 by King Charles VI of France and dedicated it to "'Our Lady', who helped someone who had lost their way while out hunting to find the right path again".

Other sources including Menestrier named Louis II, Duke of Bourbon as founder, maybe making a mistake with the Order of Our Lady of the Thistle.

Ackermann mentions this chivalric order as historical order of France.
