= Order of the Annunciation (France) =

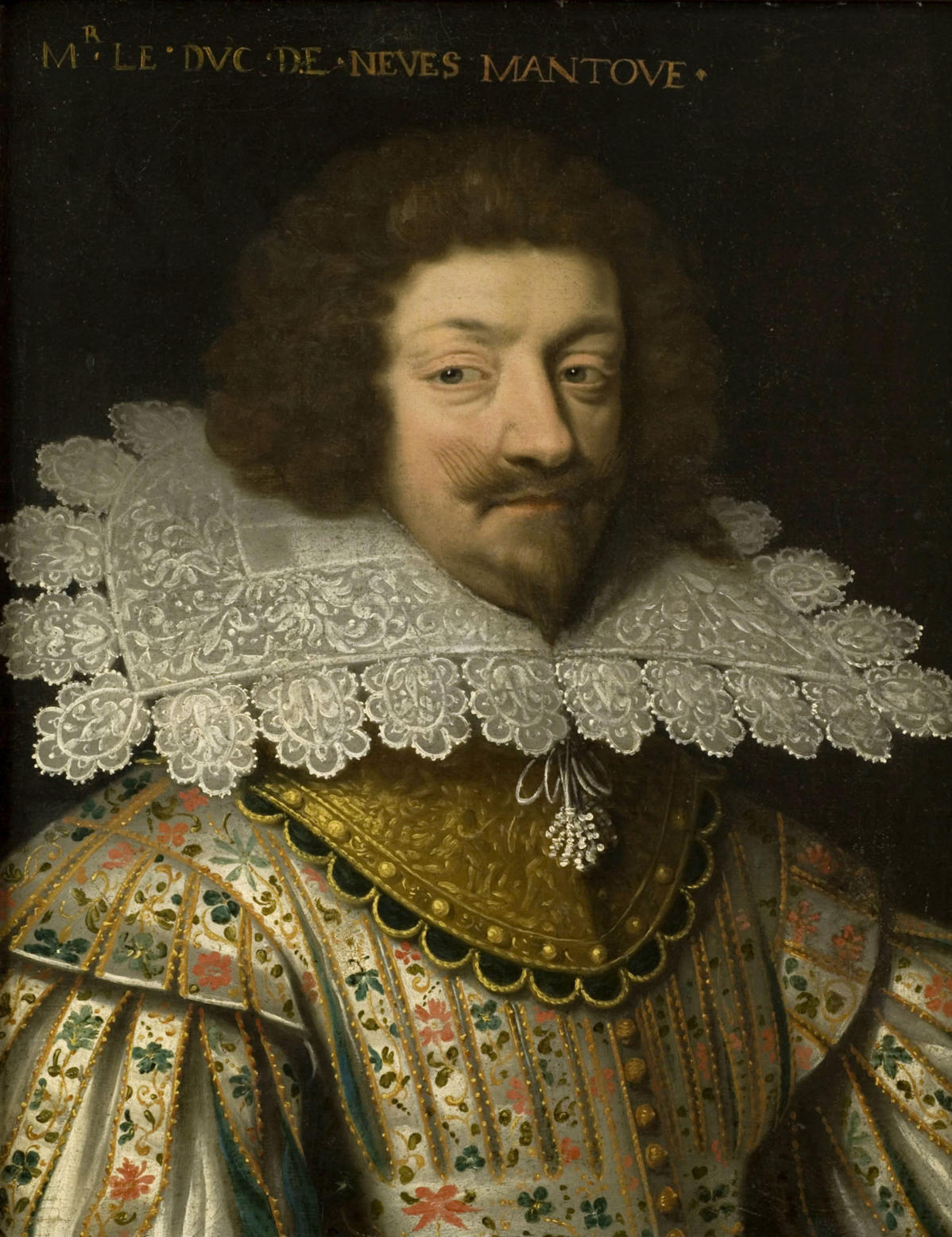
Charles I, Duke of Mantua, father of Queen of Poland Marie Louise Gonzaga de Nevers

The Order of the Annunciation, not to be mistaken with Savoy and Italy's Supreme Order of the Most Holy Annunciation, was a chivalric order founded in 1619 by Charles Gonzaga, Duke of Mantua and Montferrat, Duke of Nevers and soon flourished.

The order was intended to fight the infidels and counted, next to noble knights and spiritual knights, ministering brothers. The motto of the order was In hoc signo vincam ("By this sign, I will conquer", sign meaning the cross of the Order).

The order fell quickly into oblivion after the death of its founder.

Ackermann mentions it as a historical order of France.

== Sources ==
- Gustav Adolph Ackermann, Ordensbuch, Sämtlicher in Europa blühender und erloschener Orden und Ehrenzeichen. Annaberg, 1855, p. 244 n°191 "Der Annunciatenorden" - Google Books (Former orders of France : p. 205-214 + addings : p. 244)

== See also ==
- Order of the Yellow Ribbon, also founded in 1600 by Charles Gonzaga, Duke of Mantua and Montferrat
