= Noblewoman =

Female member of nobility

A noblewoman is a female member of nobility. Historically, while some women were ennobled in their own right, many noblewomen held their status through birth or marriage. Noblewomen have performed political, religious and cultural roles, served as patrons of the arts, and, in certain periods, exercised influence in warfare and governance.

== Titles of nobility for women ==
Within the nobility, women often served as heiresses who transmitted titles or property. They were identified by noble titles or styles acquired through birth, marriage or both, particularly in cases where estates or offices were consolidated. Common European titles of nobility for women include lady, dame, princess, baroness, countess and duchess. In Asia, corresponding titles include Adi in Fiji, Ashi in Bhutan, Khanum in parts of Central and Western Asia, and several Imperial Chinese ranks such as Gege, Mingfu, and Xiangjun.

In Europe, marriage contracts between nobles could include clauses such as the dower. Upon widowhood, such women were known as dowagers.

In Christian hagiography, many female saints are described as being of noble origin. Examples include Saint Bathilde in the seventh century, who is credited with initiating one of the earliest known acts against the slave trade, as well as Saint Jeanne de Chantal in the sixteenth century, who was born into and married within the nobility before entering religious life.

Under the Ancien Régime in France, noblewomen’s lives were defined by their education and marital alliances. Few manuscript sources directly address their experience, as most nobiliary historiographies focus on dynastic marriages and the transmission of titles.

In certain countries, such as England, noble titles could pass through maternal lines, allowing women to transmit both land and title to their descendants.

== Lives ==
Traditionally, the education of noble girls in Europe occurred in either convents (preferably noble chapters) or family homes. This education focused on moral, religious and intellectual instruction, in their memoirs or their correspondence. Many noblewomen were proficient in writing and reading.

== Responsibilities ==
=== Political and religious functions ===
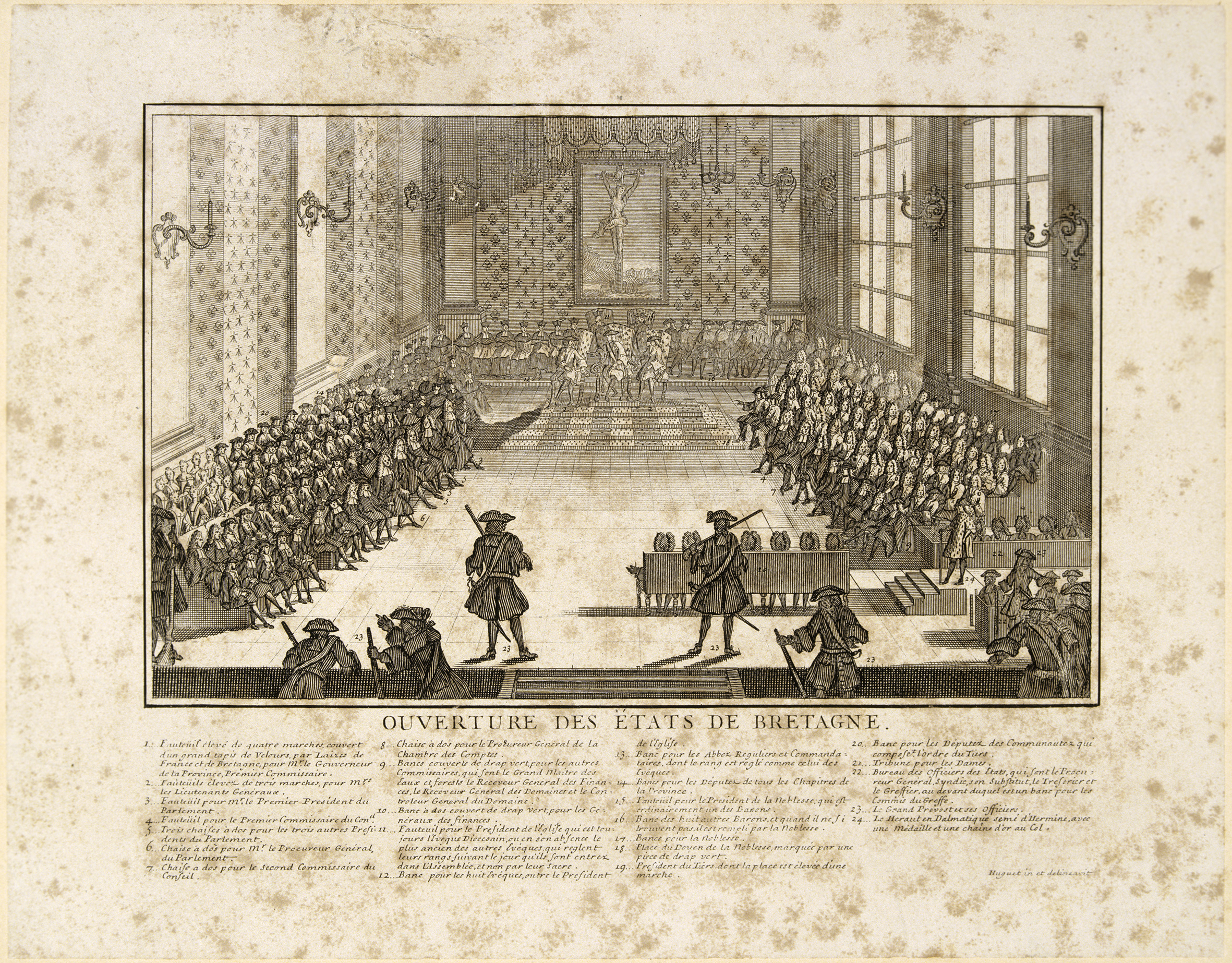
Women participating in the Estates of Brittany, (bottom left of the image) in the XVIIIth century.

In Europe, it was common for noblewomen to run abbeys, become a canoness, or take on important responsibilities in a clergy.

Proof of nobility was mandatory to join the chapter of Epinal, such as with Hildegard von Bingen in the twelfth century, who was abbess of the Benedictine monastery of Disibodenberg, founder of Rupertsberg Abbey and recognized as a Doctor of the Church.

Hersende of Champagne co-founded (alongside Robert of Arbrissel) and was first grand prioress of Fontevraud Abbey in the twelfth century.

In France, women of the nobility were admitted to the Estates of Brittany.

=== Patronage and charity ===
Patronage was one of the few areas in which European noblewomen could exercise genuine independence. They often chose which artists to support, and commissioned both religious and secular works, including manuscripts that reflected their personal interests. Many women ordered books of hours to be written in their native languages or with specific devotional texts.

Through patronage, noblewomen also influenced social and religious life. Some provided financial support to reformist movements, including the Huguenot cause and the followers of Dutch dissenter David Joris. In the twelfth century, Ermengarde de Narbonne presided over a court of poets, troubadours, physicians and jurists, fostering the intellectual culture of Narbonne in Occitania.

Charitable duty was another expected aspect of noble life. Noblewomen were responsible for providing aid to the poor, such as through alms, distributing goods, or assisting with medical care.

=== Education ===
Noblewomen were often responsible for the education of their children, although the extent to which they were expected to do so varied across regions and historical periods. In the eighteenth century, Marie-Elisabeth von Humboldt organised a rigorous programme of instruction for her sons, Alexander and Wilhelm, giving them access to advanced courses in science and the humanities.

=== Sciences and medicine ===
In medieval Europe, women were expected to provide basic medical care to their households if a doctor was not available, and this was extended to noblewomen as well.

As early as the twelfth century, and increasingly in the sixteenth and seventeenth centuries, some European noblewomen became healers or pharmacists, and would also share medical recipes and knowledge through letters.

== Women as knights ==
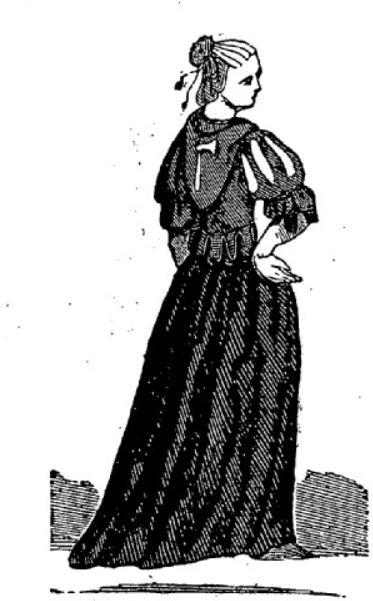
Order of the Hatchet

Several orders of chivalry were open, and some even exclusive, to women. Just as with men, these distinctions could also be honorary, granted in recognition of acts of bravery or service. They also served to organize communities of women, providing opportunities for discussion, mutual support and certain privileges.

In Austria, the Order of the Starry Cross was founded in 1688, and though it was inspired by chivalric traditions, is not technically an order of chivalry. It is reserved for ladies of the high nobility, and rewards virtue, good works and charity. The order remains active, with its Grand Mistress still drawn from the House of Austria.

=== List of women's orders of chivalry ===
Order	Location	Formation	Notes
Female order of the Band	Palencia, Crown of Castile	1387	
Order of the Ermine	France	1381	
Order of the Hatchet	Tortosa, Catalonia, Spain	1149	
Order of the Ladies of the Cord	France	1498	

== See also ==
- Women in the Middle Ages
- Women as knights
