= Order of Saint Hubert (disambiguation) =

Order of Saint Hubert can refer to:

- the Order of Saint Hubert, a dynastic order of the dukes of Jülich, electors of Palatine and kings of Bavaria
- the International Order of St. Hubertus, a hunting order of knighthood
- the Order of St Hubert in Württemberg, see Order of the Crown (Württemberg)
- the Order of Hubert, of the Duchy of Bar and later France
