= Order of the Christian Charity =

The Order of Christian Charity was, supposedly, founded in 1589 by the French King Henry III and was granted to disabled veterans.

According to Favin, but wrong according to Bullot & Hélyot, those received in the order were wearing on their coats an anchored-cross embroidery in satin or white taffeta, lined with blue silk, charged in its center with a blue satin diamond, embroidered with a gold fleur-de-lis. Around the cross was embroidered "Pour avoir fidellement servi" ("For having faithfully served").

The knights were entitled to a pension and to shelter and care. The Order should ensure that they could live in Paris adequately and without a care in the hospital of the "Charité Chrétienne". Nothing come much of it, although it was perfectioned by Henry IV of France.

Louis XIII tried a remedy by establishing the "Commanderie Saint-Louis". But, it was only during the reign of King Louis XIV, that, after the construction of the Hôtel des Invalides, one has really done something to care for the (military) casualties of the war.

Ackermann mentions this chivalric order as historical order of France.

Bullot & Hélyot consider this as a purported Order. They consider only true that an apothecary called Mr Harouel had obtained in 1576 from Henry III, a few places left for sale in the "Hôtel des Tournelles", in order to settle an hospital he wanted to establish under the name of "Charité Chrétienne". As much to shelter homeless poor as to learn to a few orphans, born into legitimate weddings, alphabet and pharmacy. It was finally established in 1586 in the "Faubourg Saint Marcel" but didn't subsist. The hospital existed, not an order.

== Sources ==
- Palliot, La Vraye et Parfaite Science des Armoiries, 2001
- Gourdon de Genouillac, Dictionnaire des ordres de chevalerie, 2008
