= Order of the Lion =

The Order of the Lion is the name of a number of decorations issued by several monarchies and republics, and may refer to:

== Europe ==
- Order of the Lion of Finland
- Order of the Netherlands Lion
- Order of the Norwegian Lion
- Royal Order of the Lion, Kingdom of Belgium
- Order of the Lion (France)
- Order of the White Lion, Czech Republic
- Order of the Zähringer Lion, (Baden)
- Order of the Gold Lion of the House of Nassau
- House Order of the Golden Lion (Hesse-Kassel)
- Order of the Lion of Bavaria

== Africa ==
- National Order of the Lion, Senegal
- Order of the Lion (Malawi)

== Other places ==
- Order of the Lion and the Sun, Persia

== See also ==
- Military Order of the White Lion, Czechoslovakia
- Order of Henry the Lion, Duchy of Brunswick, present-day Germany
- Order of Menelik II, sometimes referred to as the Order of the Lion, Ethiopia
- Order of the Red Lion and the Sun, Iran
- Order of St Philip of the Lion of Limburg
