= Order of the Crown =

The Order of the Crown is the name of a number of decorations issued by several monarchies. The following nations either presently, or in the past, have issued Orders of the Crown:

== Europe ==
- Order of the Crown (Belgium)
- Order of the Crown of King Zvonimir (Croatia)
- Order of the Crown (France)
- Order of the Crown of Italy
- Order of the Iron Crown (Italy)
- Order of the Oak Crown (Luxemburg)
- Order of the Crown (Monaco)
- Order of the Crown (Netherlands)
- Order of the Crown (Romania)
- Order of the Yugoslav Crown

German and Austrian Empires

- Imperial Order of the Iron Crown (Austria)
- Order of the Rue Crown (Kingdom of Saxony)
- House Order of the Wendish Crown (House of Mecklenburg)
- Order of the Crown (Württemberg)
- Order of the Crown (Prussia)
- Order of the Crown of Westphalia

== Other ==
- Royal Family Order of the Crown of Brunei
- Order of the Crown of Brunei
- Order of the Crown of India
- Order of the Crown (Iran)
- Order of the Precious Crown (Japan)
- Order of the Crown of Johor
- Order of the Crown of the Realm (Malaysia)
- Order of Loyalty to the Crown of Malaysia
- Royal Order of the Crown of Hawaii
- Order of the Crown (Tajikistan)
- Order of the Crown of Thailand
- Order of the Crown of Tonga
