= Order of the Sword (disambiguation) =

Order of the Sword is a Swedish order of chivalry created in 1748.

Order of the Sword may also refer to:

- Order of Saint James of the Sword, a Portuguese order of chivalry (1170)
- Order of the Faith and Peace, a 13th-century military order in Gascony
- Order of the Sword (Cyprus) (1347)
- Order of the Sword (United States), an honor awarded within the U.S. Air Force
- Order of the Sword (Devil May Cry), a religious cult in the video game Devil May Cry 4

== See also ==
- Livonian Brothers of the Sword, a military order founded by Bishop Albert of Riga in 1202
