= National Order of Labour =

National Order of Labour may refer to:

- National Order of Labour (Bulgaria), an order of the Kingdom and People's Republic of Bulgaria
- National Order of Labour (France), an order of Vichy France
