= Order of the Golden Chains =

John I, Duke of Bourbon founded in 1414 the Order of the Golden Chains.

The members of the knighthood had to "fight the laziness, increase the glory and honor of the knights by their military operations and acquire the favor of a highly revered lady".

The knighthood order counted, except the Grand Master, sixteen knights of old nobility and wore a gold chain on Sunday to the right ankle. The boys associated to the order wore a silver chain and were called the "Squires of the Silver Chain" . These boys, in order to acquire to the golden chain of the order, had to fight every two years on a knight tournament, single combat "up to life or death" . This courtly ideal, in which knights protecting vulnerable women, was characteristic of the culture and chivalrous self-image of the late Middle Ages. In the peculiar conditions, we see that the European chivalry in the 15th century was decadent and very artificial. The rough warrior has melted, at the courts, into a refined courtier.

Nothing came much of the order. The Duke fell, during the battle of Agincourt on October 25, 1415 in English captivity and died after 19 years in an English castle.

Ackermann mentions this chivalric order as an historical order of France.

== Sources ==
- Gustav Adolph Ackermann, " Ordensbuch, Sämtlicher in Europa blühender und erloschener Orden und Ehrenzeichen ". Annaberg, 1855, p 210 n°90. "Orden der Ritter von der goldenen Kettel, und der Schilknappen von der silbernen Kettel" - Google Books (Former orders of France : p. 205-214)
