= Order of the Knights Bannerets =

The Order of the Knights Bannerets was a French knighthood mentioned in a biography of Sir Robert Bruce Cotton, 1st Baronet (1570–1631) by Thomas Smith.

Smith writes: "Ex omnibus inventis propositis illud uti videtur, de novo equitem ordine instituendo regi Jacobo I maxime placuit" (i.e., "Of all the proposed findings that were to be seen, the knighthood order newly formed by James I pleased especially").

Ackermann mentions this chivalric order as historical order of France.

== Sources ==
- Gustav Adolph Ackermann, Ordensbuch, Sämtlicher in Europa blühender und erloschener Orden und Ehrenzeichen. Annaberg, 1855, p 244 n°190 "Orden der Bannerherren" - Google Books (Former orders of France : p. 205-214 + addings p. 244)
