= Order of the Passion of Christ =

The Order of the Passion of Christ was a French knighthood order which was founded around 1395 by King Richard II of England along with his father-in-law king Charles VI of France. It was a crusader knighthood.

The two kings prepared a Crusade to the Holy Land and for this knighthood there would be not less than one hundred thousand knights to be counted and in the literature the biggest order of all time. Only at this time, would orders come with a similar number of knights. It seems that the intention of the founders to have been to take all European knights on crusade .

But nothing came from the plans. Richard was killed in 1400, and Charles, who was insane since 1392, had less often a period of recovery as that one in which he was able to set this order.

Ackermann mentions this knighthood order as an historical order of France.

== Sources ==
- Gustav Adolph Ackermann, " Ordensbuch, Sämtlicher in Europa blühender und erloschener Orden und Ehrenzeichen ". Annaberg, 1855, p 208; 80. "Orden der Leiden Christi" - Google Books (Former orders of France : p. 205-214)
