= Order of the Porcupine =

14th-16th century French order

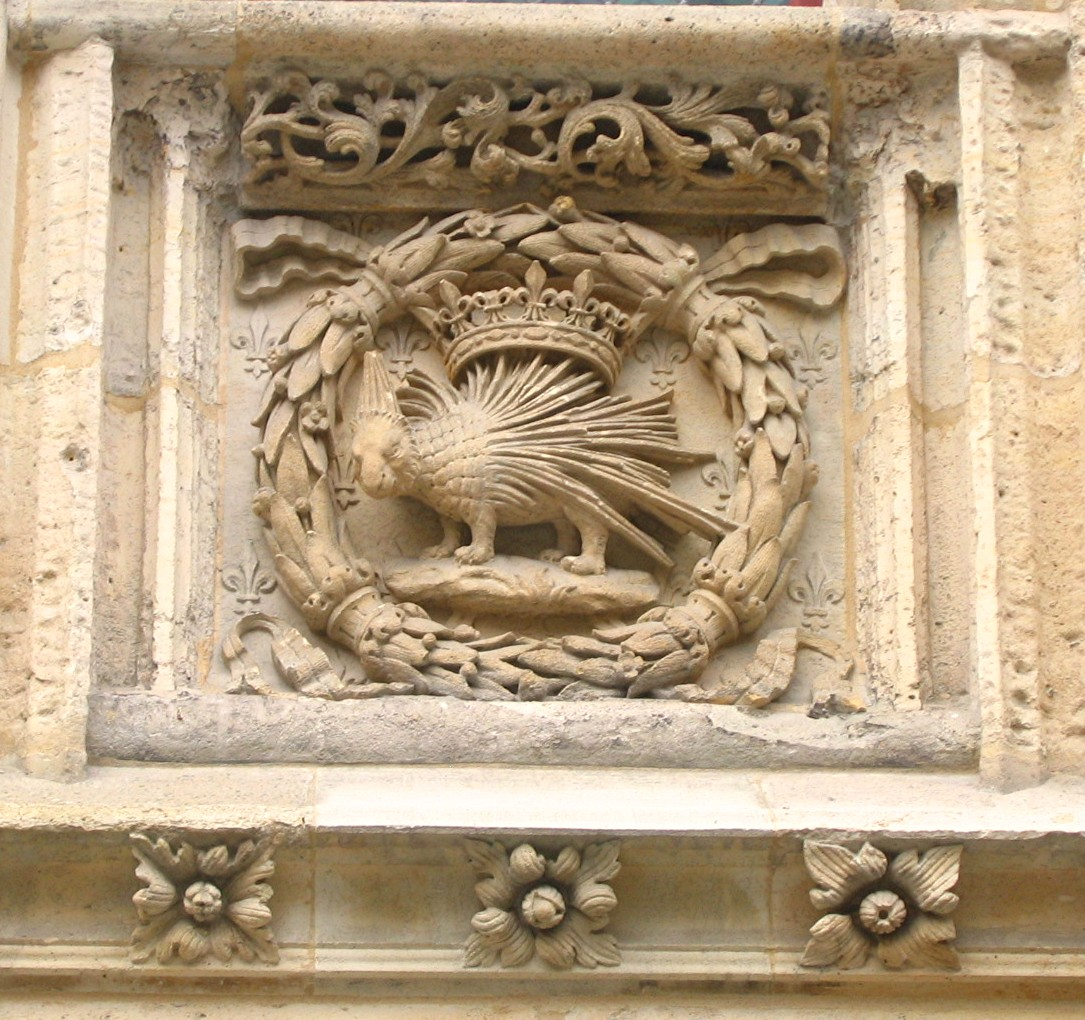
Insignia carved on the Hôtel de Bourgtheroulde, Rouen, 16th century

The Order of the Porcupine (French: Ordre du Porc-Épic, Ordre du Camail) was established by Louis de France, Duke of Orléans, in 1394, at the occasion of his elder son Charles' baptism.

== Award and history ==
Louis I, Duke of Orleans declared himself Grand Master of the Order and conferred membership on the lords of his court, with the aim of linking their faithfulness to his person. The knights' number was set to twenty-five, Sovereign Chief included.

Louis I, Duke of Orléans probably chose the porcupine as symbol to show to the Duke of Burgundy, Philip the Bold, that he would revenge of his braving him, as the porcupine points his quills to its enemies.

From captivity in England, in 1439 Louis' son, Charles I, Duke of Orléans, promoted numerous members to the Order. After Charles' release in 1440, which was secured in part through the help of the Philip the Good, Duke of Burgundy, it is thought that Charles and Philip exchanged memberships in the Order of the Porcupine and the Order of the Golden Fleece.

King Louis XII eventually terminated the Order, preferring the French Order of Saint Michael, but he did grant membership to both Michel Gaillard father and son.

== Insignia ==
The collar of the order was composed of a tortil of three gold chains, at the end of which a gold porcupine hung on a green-enamelled flowered terrace. It was worn on an azure (Note: or violet, according to the sources.) velvet coat, lined with crimson satin, ornamented with a cope and a mantle, both crimson. Under the coat, the knights wore a long violet garment.

The knights received, on the day of their nomination, a gold ring adorned by a cameo (called in French at the period, "camaïeu" or "kamaheu" or even "camail") upon which a porcupine was engraved. For this reason, the Order of the Porcupine was also called the Ordre du Camail or "Ordre du Camaïeu" ("Order of the Cameo").

The Latin motto of the order was Cominus et Eminus (English "Near and Far") which was also the motto of Louis I, Duke of Orleans.

Ackermann mentions this chivalric order as a historical order of France.

== Porcupine symbol of the Valois-Orleans ==
The porcupine remained the King's symbol, as it appears in Blois, even if the order was cancelled by King Louis XII.

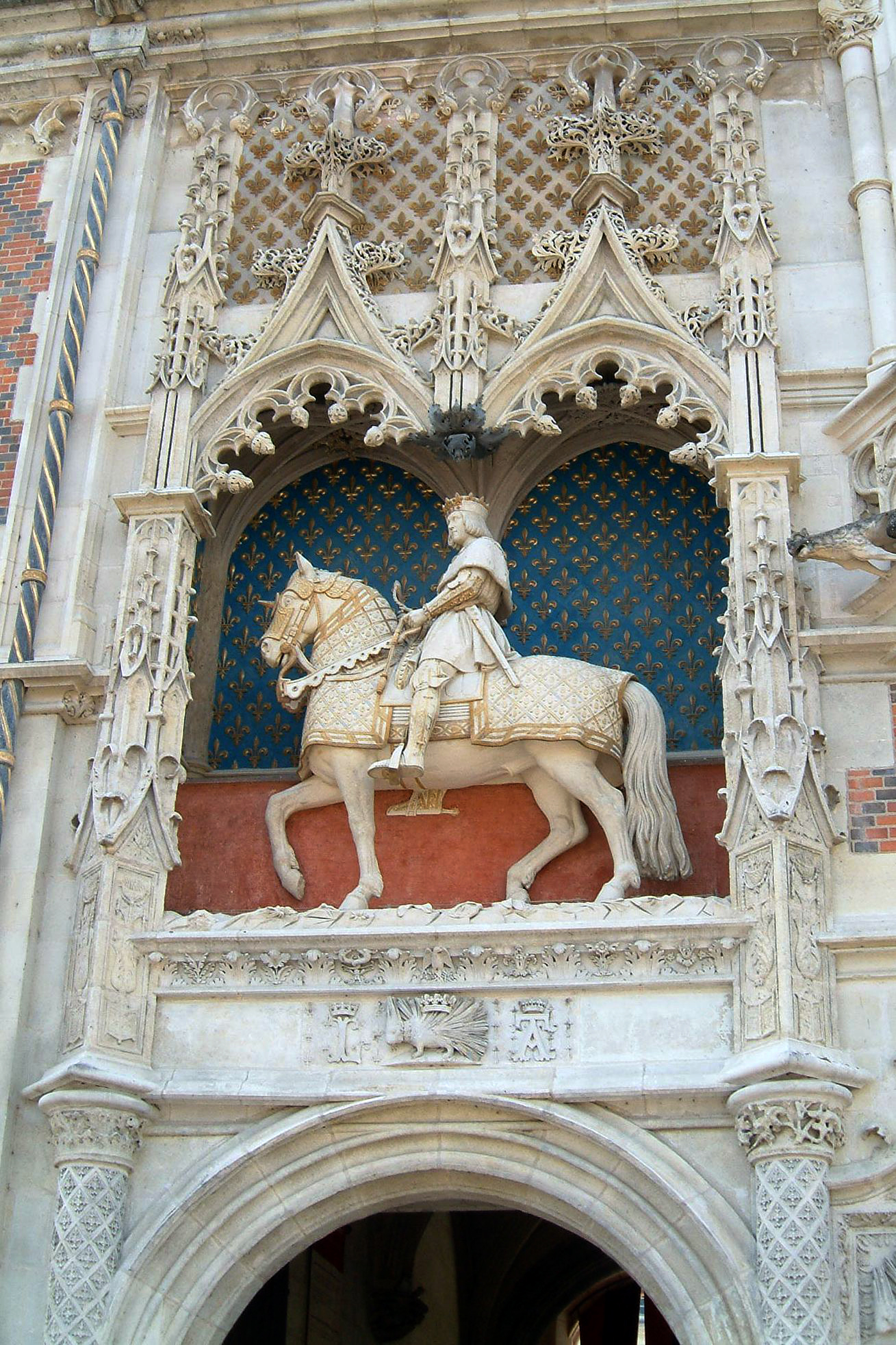
Château de Blois, King Louis XII's portrait with the porcupine underneath

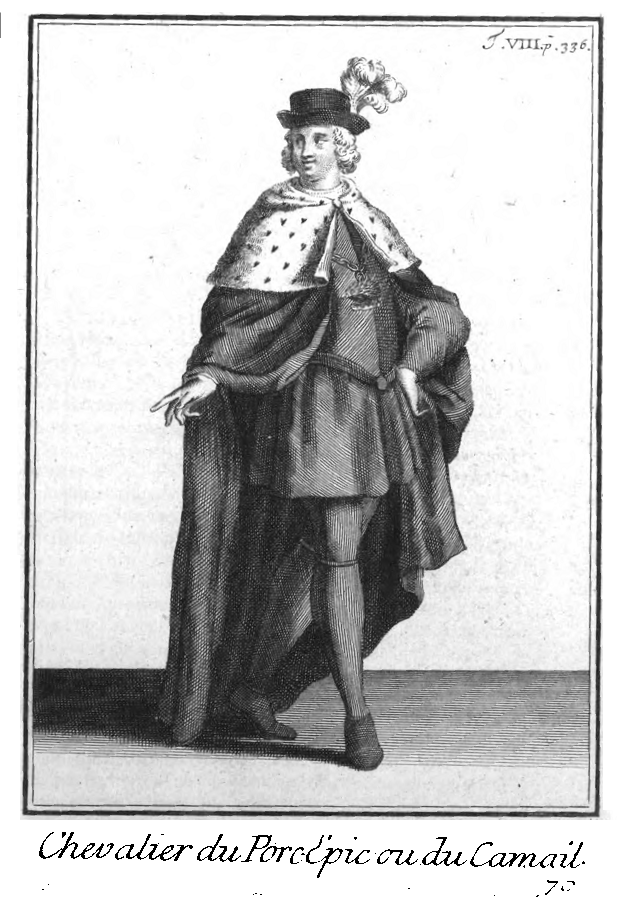
Ceremonial cloth of a knight of the Order (François de Poilly, Reconstruction of the 17th century)

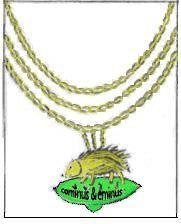
Order's collar

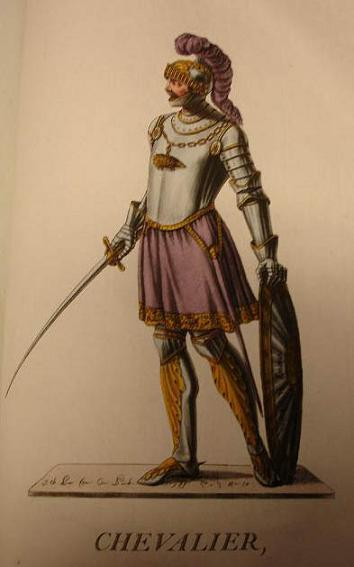
Knight of the Order

== Sources ==
- Arn, Mary-Jo, ed. (2000). Charles D'Orléans in England, 1415-1440. D.S. Brewer.
- Boulton, D'Arcy Jonathan Dacre (1987). The Knights of the Crown: The Monarchical Orders of Knighthood in Later Medieval Europe. The Boydell Press.
- Bullot, Maximilien; Hélyot, Pierre (1719). Histoire des ordres monastiques, religieux et militaires, et des congregations seculieres de l'un & l'autre sexe, qui ont esté establies jusque'à present (in French). Vol. 8. Nicolas Gosselin.
- Famiglietti, R. C. (1992). Tales of the Marriage Bed from Medieval France (1300-1500). Picardy Press.
- Hochner, Nicole (2006). Louis XII: les dérèglements de l'image royale, 1498-1515 (in French). Champ Vallon.
- Vallet de Viriville, Auguste (1867). "Médaille frappée a la monnaie Paris sous Charles VII". Annuaire de la Société française de numismatique et d 'archéologie (in French). Vol. 2. Paris: Société Bibiothèque et Cercle Numismatique. pp. 208–257.
