= Order of the Lion (France) =

Order of knighthood in France

The Order of the Lion was an order of knighthood set up by Enguerrand I of Coucy (or, according to other sources, his grandson Enguerrand II), to keep alive the memory of his killing a dangerous lion. It was short-lived and was forgotten after its founder's death.

His successor Enguerrand VII founded the Order of the Crown in 1378

Gustav Adolph Ackermann mentions the two orders as among the historical orders of France.

== Sources ==
- Gustav Adolph Ackermann, Ordensbuch, Sämtlicher in Europa blühender und erloschener Orden und Ehrenzeichen. Annaberg, 1855, p 209 n°83. "Orden des Löwen" - Google Books (Former orders of France : p. 205-214)
