= Order of the Golden Shield =

In 1369, Louis II "the Good", duke of Bourbon founded the Knights of the Golden Shield to commemorate the release from English captivity of noble hostages held along with the king John II of France. This release came in 1369, five years after the death of the captive king.

The knighthood order counted, except the Grand Master, twelve knights, and was aimed at defending and protecting women. This courtly ideal, in which knights were protecting vulnerable women, was typical of the culture and chivalrous self-image of the late Middle Ages. The motto of the order was "Allons" (Let's go).

The order is also called the "Order of the Green Shield."

Ackermann mentions this chivalric order as historical order of France.

Louis II's honour system was completed with the foundation of the Order of Our Lady of the Thistle in 1370.

== Sources ==
- Gustav Adolph Ackermann, " Ordensbuch, Sämtlicher in Europa blühender und erloschener Orden und Ehrenzeichen ". Annaberg, 1855, p 209 - 210 n°87. "Orden vom goldenen (och grünen) Schild" - Google Books (Former orders of France : p. 205-214)
