= Order of the Ermine (France) =

Chivalric order of the 14th and 15th centuries in the Duchy of Brittany

The Order of the Ermine (L'Ordre de l'Hermine) was a chivalric order of the 14th and 15th centuries in the Duchy of Brittany. The ermine is the emblem of Brittany. In the 20th century, it was revived by the Cultural Institute of Brittany as an honor for those contributing to Breton culture.

== Medieval ==
During his last period of exile at the court of England (1377–1379), John V, Duke of Brittany, observed the functioning of the Order of the Garter. Back in Brittany, in 1381, he created his own order. The little we know of this order comes from Guillaume de St-André. In 1448, it became the Order of the Ermine and the Ear of Grain (Ordre de l'Hermine et de l'Épi). The ermine was a natural choice for the badge of his order, since the heraldic representation of its fur is the coat of arms of the Dukes of Brittany. In medieval times the ermine was believed to risk capture or death rather than sully the purity of its white fur and thus a symbol of concern for the uncompromising integrity of one's personal honor.

The Order admitted men and women of any social rank who had wrought exceptional service to the sovereign Duchy of Brittany. Other than the Order of the Hatchet of Tortosa, which was founded in 1149, this Breton order of chivalry has the only-known medieval instance of a woman, Katherine Potier, serving as an Officer of Arms; she bore the title of "Espy Herault". She was appointed to the office after the death of her husband, Yves, by Duchess Anne of Brittany.

Ackermann mentions this chivalric order as historical order of France. And that is because, notionally, it could have been said to have been in the gift of Duchess Anne de Bretagne as Queen of France [to Charles VIII from 1492–98], while Brittany had been annexed to allegiance to the Valois Monarchy.

After the death of Anne's daughter Claude of France in 1524, the order was allowed to fall into disuse, since her son, Francis III, Duke of Brittany, had been brought up at the French court, and did not consider himself a Breton.

The collar of a member of the order was composed of plaited ears of wheat, with a running ermine hanging from a small chain, all in gold.

== Modern ==
A modern honor by the same name was created in 1972 to honor those who contribute to Breton culture and development. At its head is a Chancellor (Yves Lainé) and two vice-chancellors: Riwanon Kervella and André Lavanant. The siege is at the Institut Culturel de Bretagne, the castle of the Ermine, Vannes.

== Sources ==
- Gustav Adolph Ackermann, Ordensbuch, Sämtlicher in Europa blühender und erloschener Orden und Ehrenzeichen. Annaberg, 1855, p 207 n° 73. "Orden des Hermelins in der Bretagne". (Former orders of France : p. 205–214)
