= Order of Our Lady of the Thistle =

The Order of Our Lady of the Thistle was founded in January 1370 in Moulins, by Louis II "the Good", Duke of Bourbon « in the honour of God and the Immaculated Virgin», at the occasion of his marriage with Anne of Auvergne, Heiress Countess of Forez, daughter of Beraud II, Dauphin of Auvergne and Jeanne of Forez; niece of John, Count of Forez.

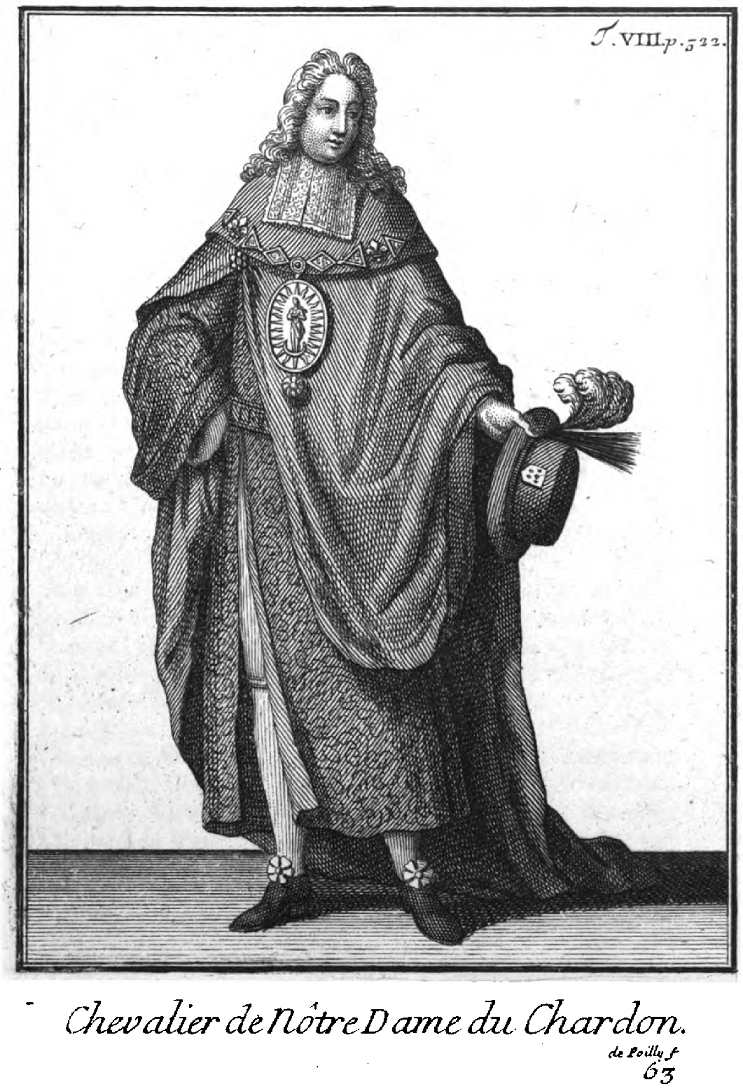
Ceremonial cloth of a knight of the Order (François de Poilly, Reconstruction of the 17th century)

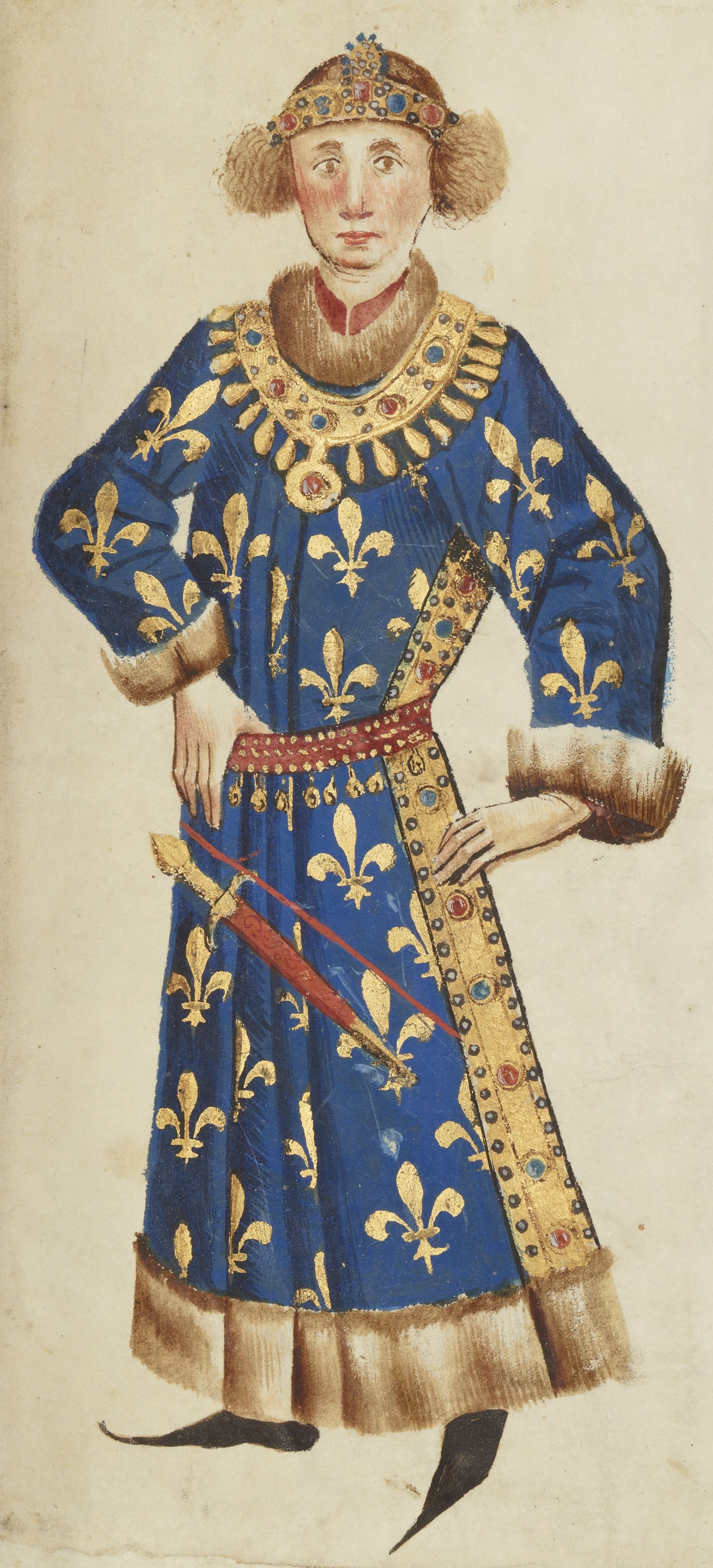
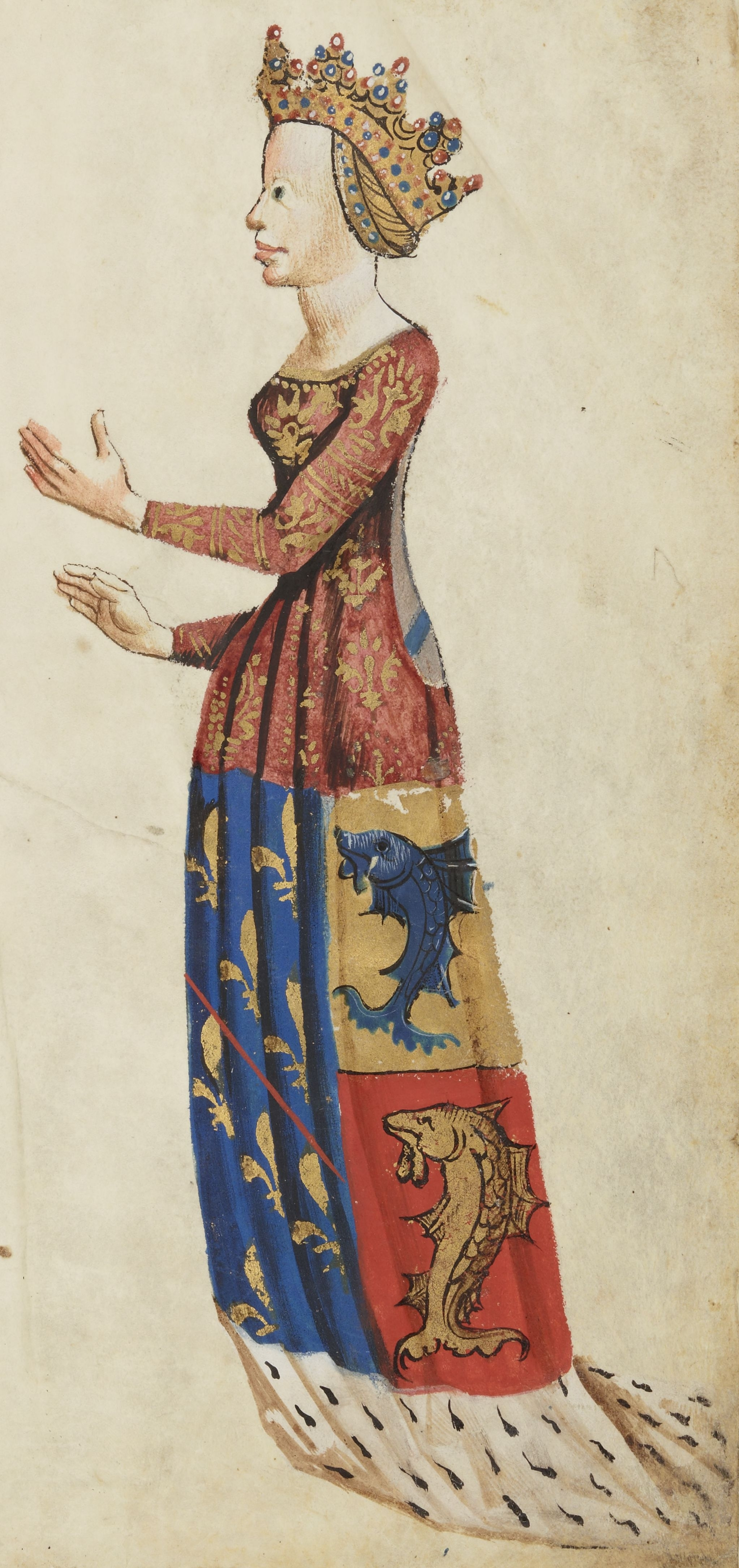
Louis II "the Good" - Anne of Auvergne

== Award ==
Next to its sovereign, the Duke of Bourbon, the chivalric order had 26 noble knights distinguished for their bravoury and for being blameless.

It completes the Bourbon honour system next to the order of the Golden Shield founded in 1369.

Ackermann mentions this chivalric order as historical order of France and writes that the order, according to other sources, was founded in the 15th century.

== Details and insignia ==
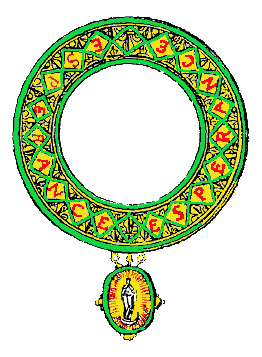
A reconstruction of the chain of the Order

The order is also called the "Order of Bourbon" due to its founder or the "Order of Hope", because the knights were wearing a belt with the embroidered word "ESPERANCE". The order owes its origin to the belt that the hostage duke was wearing in his English captivity and that he called "the belt of hope" ("de l'esperance"). This suggests that the belt was showing thistles, perhaps in combination with an image of the Holy Virgin.

The day of the Conception of the Virgin, feast of the Order, and other solemn feast days, knights wore :

- a crimson damask cassock, with wide sleeves, girded with a blue velvet belt lined with red satin, bordered with gold embroidery, and the word ESPERANCE similarly embroidered;
- the belt was closed by a gold buckle and prong, bearded and checked with green enamel as the head a thistle;
- their coat was of sky-blue damask, with gold embroidered orphreys representing the collar, lined with red satin.

The Grand Collar of the Order was composed of full and half diamonds with green-glazed double cleché and semé-de-lis orles and red-enamelled antique capital letters, forming the word ESPERANCE; at the end of the necklace hung a circle of green and red enamel with an image of the Virgin surrounded by a golden sun, crowned with twelve stars of silver, a silver crescent under his feet. At the bottom of the medal was a green-enameled and white-bearded thistle head.

The knights hat was green velvet at the tip of which hung a tuft of crimson silk and gold thread, the ancient-mood back fur-lined with crimson panne with, in a golden shield, the word ALLEN (Let's all go together in the service of God, and be united in the defense of our country and where we can find to conquer honor by deeds of chivalric).

== Sources ==
- Gustav Adolph Ackermann, " Ordensbuch, Sämtlicher in Europa blühender und erloschener Orden und Ehrenzeichen ". Annaberg, 1855, p 210 n°88. "Orden Unserer liebe Frau von der Distel" - Google Books (Former orders of France : p. 205-214)
