= Peire Guillem de Tolosa =

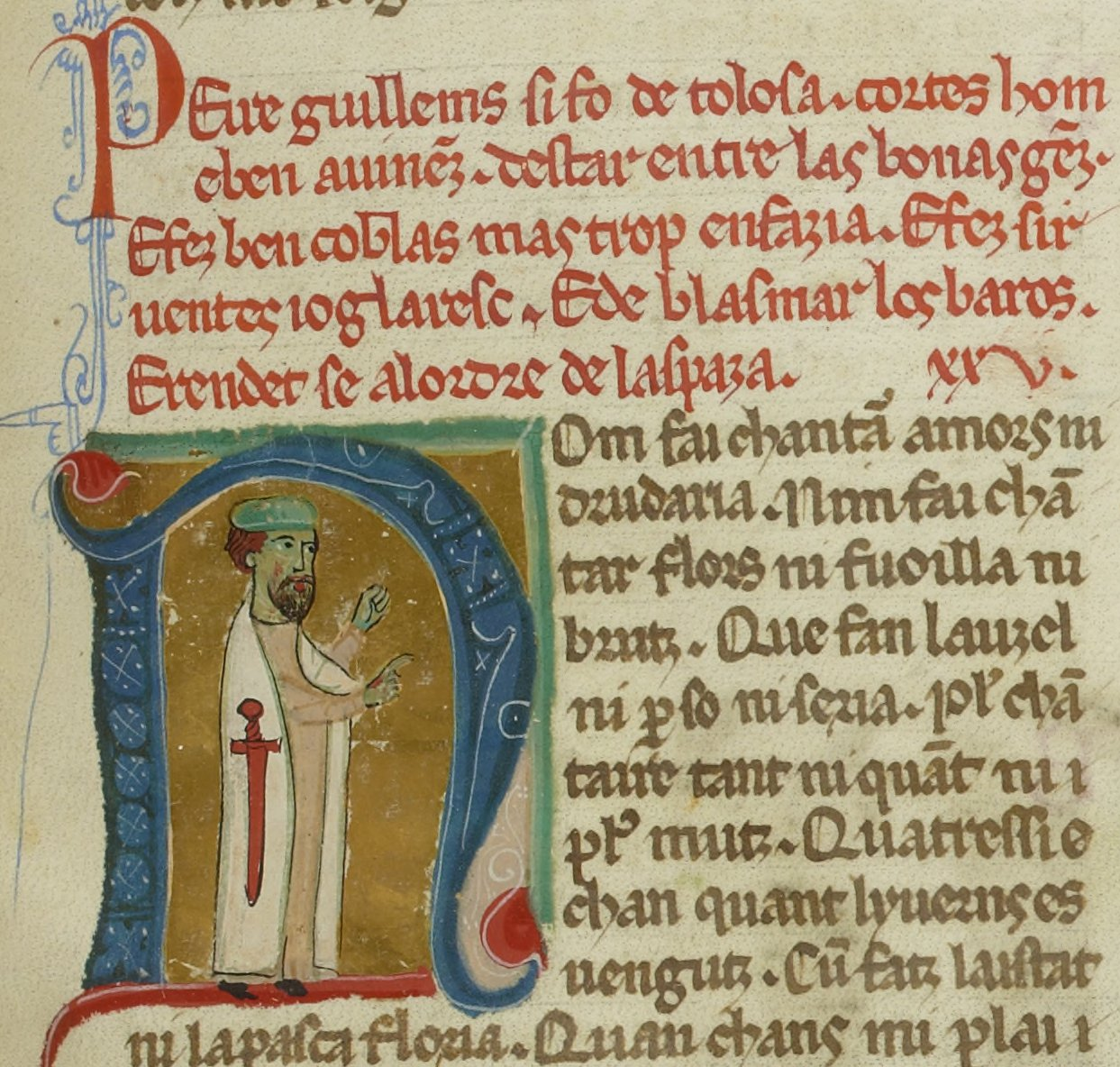
Here, Peire is portrayed as a knight of Santiago

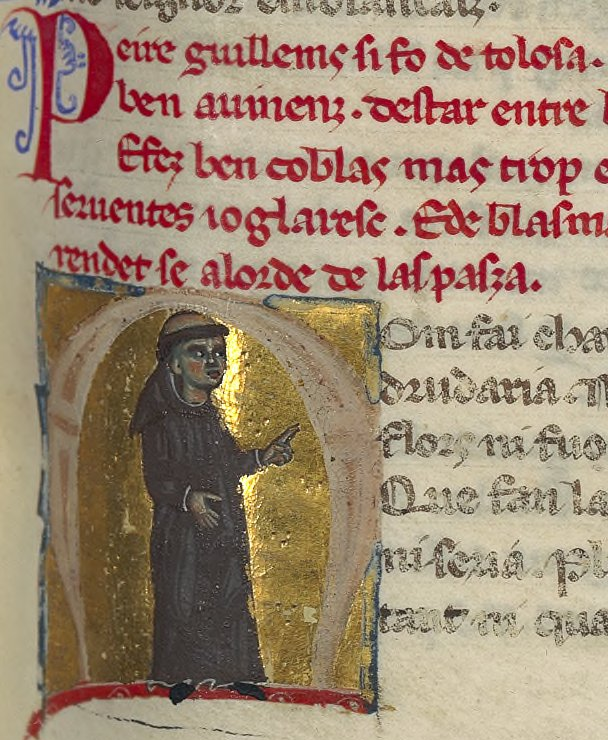
"Pere Guillem was from Toulouse. . ." He is portrayed here as a monk.

Peire Guillem (or Guilhem) de Tolosa was a 13th-century troubadour from Toulouse. Only one sirventes he wrote ("En Sordel, que us es semblan"), a tenso with the contemporary Italian poet Sordello, survives.

According to his vida, Peire Guillem was a courtly man who loved high society. The author of the vida also expresses admiration for his couplets but laments the excessive number he composed, even though so few of his works still exist. He was also said to have composed sirventes joglarescs, or sirventes in the manner of joglars, to criticise "the barons" (presumably the high noblesse). He also wrote a work criticising the prolific trouvère Theobald I of Navarre.

The troubadour Bertran Carbonel twice mentions another troubadour by the initials P.G., possibly indicating Peire Guilhem. He mourns a certain P.G. in a planh, where the initials probably stand in the manuscript for a full name, since three syllables would be required by the metre. Perhaps Pey Guillem, Pey being a hypocoristic form of Peire, is intended. In another case, Bertran directs a sirventes of admonition against a troubadour identified only by his initials: .P. / ponchat et enapres un .G..

According to his vida, he entered the "Order of Spaza," probably the "Order of the Sword," which means either the Order of Santiago or the Order of the Faith and Peace.

== Sources ==
- The Vidas of the Troubadours. Margarita Egan, trans. New York: Garland, 1984. ISBN 0-8240-9437-9.
- "PC 345: Peire Guillem de Toloza," Bibliografia Elettronica dei Trovatori, v. 1.5.
