= Order of the Faith and Peace =

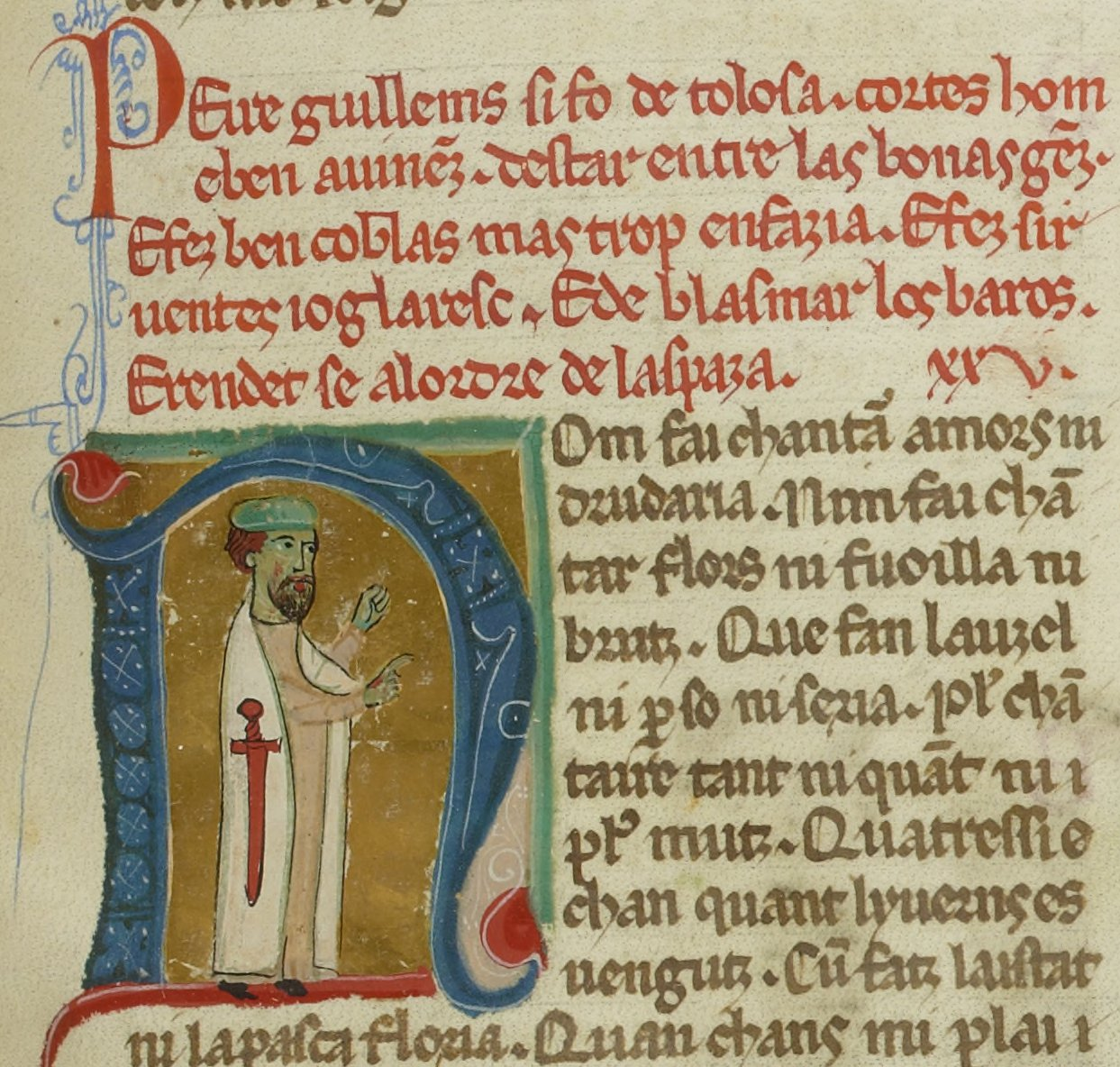
Peire Guillem de Tolosa portrayed as a "knight of the sword".

The Order of the Faith and Peace or Order of the Sword was a military order in Gascony in the mid-13th century.

The order was first mentioned by Pope Gregory IX in 1231 in a letter to magistro militiae ordinis sancti Jacobi ejusque fratribus tam presentibus quam futuris ad defensionem fidei et pacis in Guasconia constitutis ("the master of the military order of Saint James and his brothers present and future constituted for the defence of the faith and of the peace in Gascony"). It was founded by Amanieu I, Archbishop of Auch. Since Amanieu had been appointed to his see in 1226, the date of the foundation must be located in 1226–1231. Gregory had sent a letter to Amanieu in 1227 exhorting him to establish the peace, which may have prompted the founding of an order of knighthood. Amanieu and the order's earliest members travelled to Rome in 1231 and there received confirmation from Gregory.

The order had properties mainly west of Toulouse in the dioceses of Auch, Bayonne, Comminges, and Lescar. Its main purpose was not to fight heresies like Catharism but rather to keep the peace in the Auxitana provincia (province of Auch). Gregory placed it under a rule adapted from the Order of Santiago and its first major patron was the Viscount of Béarn, Gaston VII.

The order seems to have struggled to remain viable. In 1262 its master attempted to amalgamate it with the Cistercian abbey of Les Feuillants. In 1267 Pope Clement IV deposed the master for malice and neglect of his duties. The archbishop of Auch, now Amanieu II, tried to save the organisation in 1268 by purchasing for it a hospital at Pont d'Artigues from the Order of Santiago and appointing his nephew as master. The order was dissolved by Gregory X in 1273 and its possessions ended up largely in the hands of the Order of Santiago and the church of Auch, though Les Feuillants laid claim to some.

There may be a vernacular, narrative reference to the Order in the Occitan vida of the troubadour Peire Guillem de Tolosa, who was said to have entered the ordre de la Spaza (probably "order of the Sword").

Ackermann mentions this chivalric order as a historical order of France and proposes 1229 as founding year.

== Bibliography ==
- Forey, Alan J. (1989). "The Military Orders and Holy War against Christians in the Thirteenth Century." The English Historical Review, 104:410 (January), pp. 1–24.
- Forey, Alan J. (1992). The Military Orders: From the Twelfth to the Early Fourteenth Centuries. Toronto: University of Toronto Press. ISBN 978-0-8020-2805-1.
- Gustav Adolph Ackermann, Ordensbuch, Sämtlicher in Europa blühender und erloschener Orden und Ehrenzeichen. Annaberg, 1855, p 208 n°76. "Orden des Friedens und Glaubens" - Google Books (Former orders of France : p. 205-214)
