= Order of the Ladies of the Cord =

Cordelière

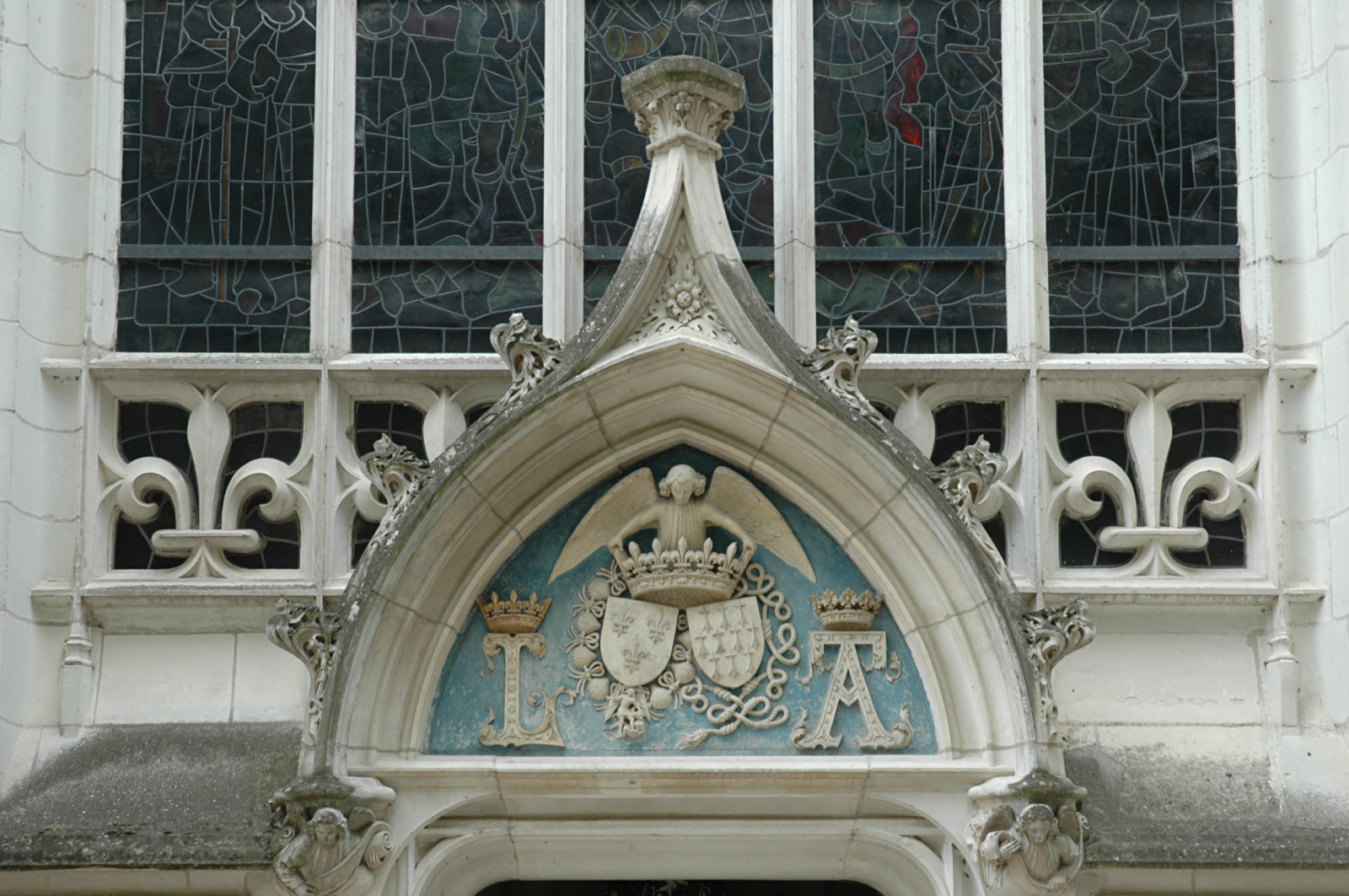
Château de Blois, gable of the chapel's entrance showing crowned initials of Louis XII and Anne with their arms surrounded by the Orders of Saint Michael and the Cord.

The Order of the Ladies of the Cord (French: L'Ordre des Dames chevalières de la Cordelière or Ordre de la Cordelière), was a ladies order founded by the French queen Anne of Brittany in 1498. This rope with knots had been added by her step-grandfather, Francis I, Duke of Brittany, to his arms in honor of St. Francis, his patron saint; her father, Francis II, Duke of Brittany, had continued the emblem. The order was founded after the death of her husband king Charles VIII. The choice of name is not clear. Some sources speak of the node in the Scourge of the Savior, others from the cord of the sacred Francis of Assisi and still others of deliverance from the pressing duty of the unfortunate and involuntary marriage of Charles and Anna.

The symbol of the belt cord was also used in manuscript ordered by Anne of Brittany, for example, in the prayer book that let make between 1492 and 1495 for her son, Charles-Orland, the Dauphin.

The motto of the order was J'ay le corps délié ("I have the body untied").

Ackermann writes that the later French habit of drawing cords around the arm of a French noble widow, a so-called Cordelière, can be brought back to the symbol of this order and mentions this order as a historical order of France.
