= Amanieu II (archbishop of Auch) =

Amanieu II (after 1230 – 11 March 1318) was the Archbishop of Auch. Elected in 1261, he received consecration at Rome from Pope Urban IV in 1263.

Amanieu was the third son of Roger, viscount of Fezensaguet, and Pucelle d'Albret, and thus a descendant of the Counts of Armagnac and the Sires of Albret. Amanieu's eldest brother was Geraud VI of Armagnac. In 1278 Geraud and Amanieu signed a treaty sharing jurisdiction in Barran, where the bishop had his summer residence, between the Church and the County. The village was fortified as a bastide the next year (1279).

In 1268 Amanieu purchased the hospital of Pont d'Artigues from the Order of Santiago for the Order of the Faith and Peace, a military order founded by his predecessor to keep the peace in Gascony. He also appointed his nephew master of the order, but it did not stave off the order's decline, which had been apparent from the early 1260s. Pope Gregory X dissolved the order in 1273 and its possessions ended up largely in the hands of the Order of Santiago and the church of Auch, though Les Feuillants Abbey laid claim to some.
