= Order of the Yellow Ribbon =

Order founded in 1600 by Charles III

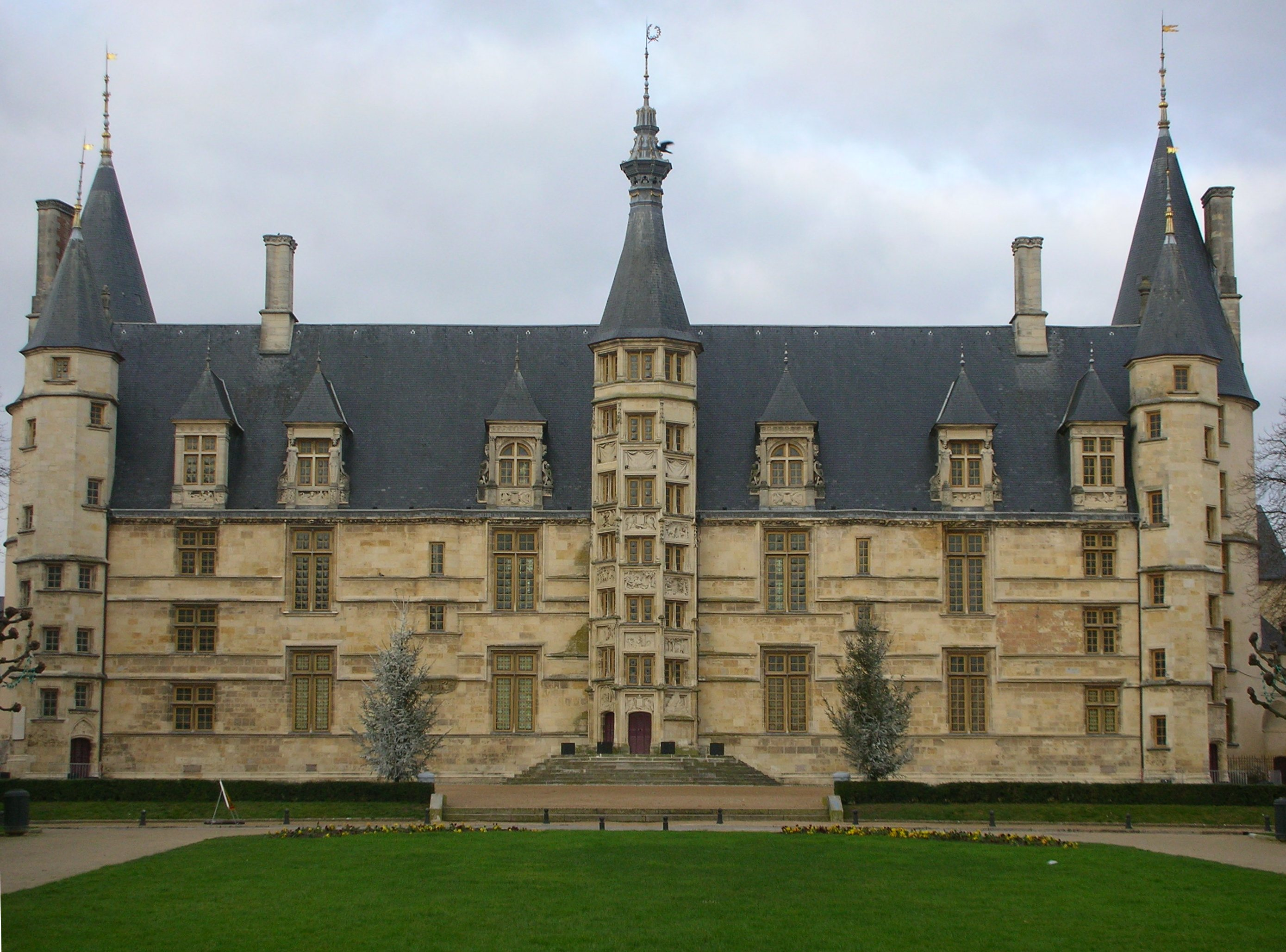
The "Palais Ducal" in Nevers. A place where one played strange games.

The Order of the Yellow Ribbon was founded in 1600 in Nevers by French-Italian nobleman Charles III, Duke of Nevers, nephew of the French king Henry III. The tasks required for membership in this chivalric order were peculiar and, in some cases, frivolous, and it was abolished soon after its creation.

== Details and insignia ==
Knights of the Order had to practice the Italian game "la mara" (raising even or odd numbers of fingers), ride on a gray horse with a red-dyed bridle, and share their goods. Gustav Adolph Ackermann writes that, according to some sources, partner exchange would also be part of the obligations of membership.

The Order of the Yellow Ribbon could be perceived as a mockery of existing chivalric orders, and the French king forbade it soon after its founding. It is nevertheless included in the historical orders of France.

== See also ==
- Order of the Annunciation, founded in 1619 by Charles III, Duke of Nevers too.

== Sources ==
- Gustav Adolph Ackermann, " Ordensbuch, Sämtlicher in Europa blühender und erloschener Orden und Ehrenzeichen ". Annaberg, 1855
