= Order of the Broom-cod =

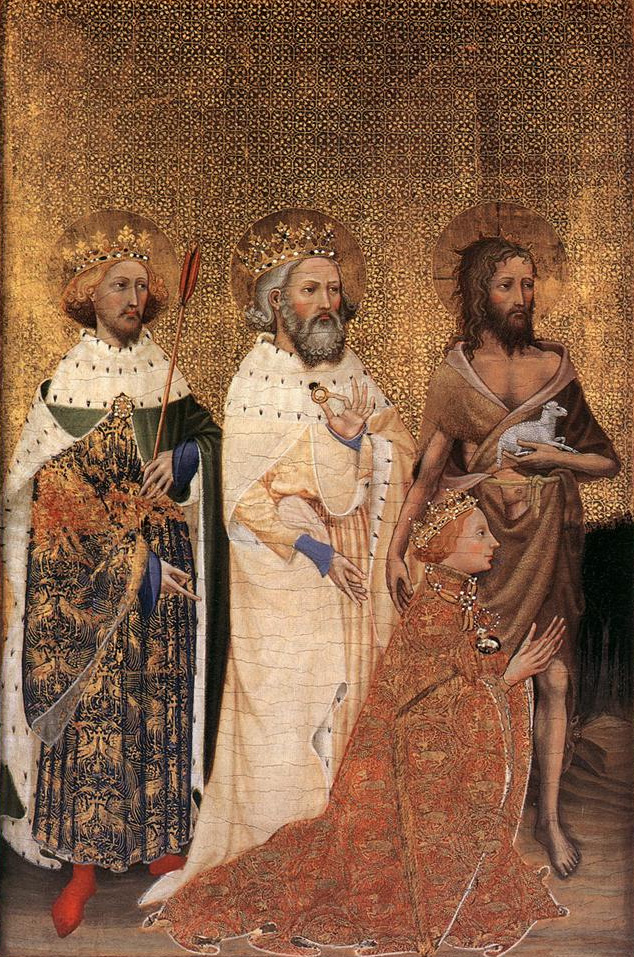
Richard II wearing the collar of the order

The Order of the Broom-cod (French: "Ordre de la Coste de Genest"), is believed to have been founded in 1234 by the French king, St. Louis IX, to commemorate his wedding with Margaret of Provence, daughter of Ramon Berenguer IV, Count of Provence, and her coronation. Other sources mention Charles VI the Beloved as the founder.

The order takes its name from the pod of the broom plant (broom-cod, or cosse de geneste), which was used as an emblem for livery collars and badges.

== Insignia ==
The collar of the order was made of a succession of broom-cods and gold fleur-de-lis and a cross – with the motto of the Order, "Exaltat humiles" (He exalts the humble), in black letters – hanging from a short necklace made of golden hearts.

Ackermann mentions this chivalric order as the historical order of France.
