= Order of Hubert =

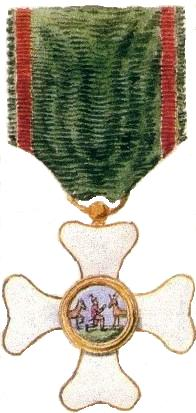
Badge of the Order of Hubert

The Order of the Greyhound was founded in 1416 in the Duchy of Bar. One also called this chivalric order, the "Order of the Faithfulness"

The order is called "Order of Hubert" since 1423. This knighthood order was founded as a knightly company for mutual love, loyalty and defense and had as insignia a greyhound with the motto "Tout en" on the collar.

The order was settled, at its establishment, for a period of five years, but flourished, favored by the kings of France until the French Revolution. In Frankfurt Louis XVIII, France's king in exile, reorganized the Order of Hubert and it was now called "Hunting Order of St. Hubert", until July 29, 1830 when it was abolished with all other former French orders.

Ackermann mentions this knighthood order as a historical order of France.

== Sources ==
- Gustav Adolph Ackermann, " Ordensbuch, Sämtlicher in Europa blühender und erloschener Orden und Ehrenzeichen ". Annaberg, 1855, p 210 n°91 "Orden des Windspiels" – Google Books (Former orders of France : p. 205–214)
