= Order of the Crown (France) =

The Order of the Crown is an order founded by the northern French nobleman Enguerrand VII, Lord of Coucy in 1378 and belongs to the historical orders of France.

Enguerrand founded the order after a successful campaign in Normandy where he had conquered, for his king, the town of Bayeux and the other Norman possessions of King Charles II of Navarre. Enguerrand was a nobleman who excelled in "courtly" behavior and a loyal vassal of the French king Charles V of France.

The order was given a crown as a symbol because this object is, as can be read on the matter-devoted poem of Eustache Deschamps' "not only the symbol of greatness and power, but also of dignity, virtue and quality behavior of the courtiers of the (French) king". The recognition sign of the order was a diadem with twelve pearls. These were the twelve flowers of authority, faith, virtue, temperance, piety, prudence, sincerity, honor, power, mercy, generosity, solidarity and largesse. Properties that "yield their light upon all who were less common name".

How the order looked is unknown; at this time it was usual that a common recognition sign was worn hanging from a chain around the neck or was embroidered on the clothes. The order will have resembled, on that point, the Order of the Dragon. In the period that Enguerrand founded his order, he chose a new seal. Upon it, on a background of little crowns, one can see a character holding a reversed crown. This may be an indication of how the award looked.

One thing special to the Order of the Crown, is that it included not only knights, but also boys (not yet knighted warriors of good family) and married or unmarried ladies.

On 26 April 1390, as he prepared for a campaign against the Muslims in the kingdom of Barbary Coast, gave Enguerrand the Order of the Celestines, a strict and ascetic monastic order, an income of 400 livres per year and money to found a cloister for twenty monks on his property in Villeneuve-Saint-Germain on the banks of the Aisne, just outside Soissons. The document speaks of "perpetual prayers for himself, his current wife, his ancestors and descendants and all the knights and ladies of his Order of the Crown".

The Order was, even though it was founded not a reigning monarch but by a powerful vassal of the French king, recognized as knighthood order by Louis I, Duke of Orléans, Regent of France.

== Sources ==
- Baron von Thurn und Zurlauben:"Histoire d'Arnaut de Cervolle, dit l' archiprêtre" in "Histoire de l'académie royale des inscriptions et belles-lettres" deel XXV, Paris 1759
- Eustache Deschamps: "Œvres complètes" gathered under the direction of the Marquis de Queux de Saint-Hillaire and G.Raynaud, part II/XII Blz.35, deel IV/XII Blz.115, Paris 1878
- Dom Michel Toussaints Chrétien Duplessis: Histoire de la ville et des seigneurs de Coucy", Parijs 1728.
- Germain Demay: "Inventaire des sceaux de la Flandre", part I, Paris 1883
- Germain Demay: "Inventaire des sceaux de la collection Clairembault", Paris 1886
- Barbara Tuchman: "A distant mirror", New York 1978
- Gustav Adolph Ackermann, " Ordensbuch, Sämtlicher in Europa blühender und erloschener Orden und Ehrenzeichen ", Annaberg, 1855, p 208 n°78. "Orden der Krone" - Google Books (Former orders of France : p. 205-214). Ackermann gives the Order of the Crown as founded in 1390 by Enguerrand VII and mentions that the Order "has not survived the death of its founder in 1397 in a cruisade".
- Abbé R. Roussel: "Histoire de l'abbaye des Célestins de Villeneuve-les-Soissons. Soissons 1904.
