= Order of the Three Golden Fleeces =

Catholic order of chivalry

Order of the Three Golden Fleeces Ordre des Trois-Toisons d'Or
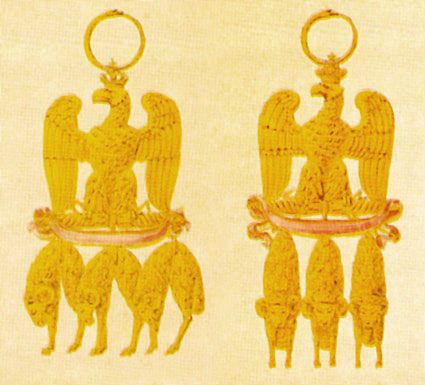
- Proposals of the insignia

Awarded by the Emperor of the French
- Type: Order of chivalry
- Established: 15 August 1809
- Royal house: House of Bonaparte
- Religious affiliation: Catholicism
- Ribbon: Red, fringed gold
- Status: Never awarded and dissolved
- Founder: Napoleon I
- Grand Master: Napoleon I

Precedence
- Next (lower): Legion of Honour
- Ribbon of the Order

The Order of the Three Golden Fleeces (French: Ordre des Trois-Toisons d'Or) was an order of chivalry instituted by Napoleon I at Schönbrunn by letters patent dated 15 August 1809. It was never awarded, ending up being dissolved by Napoleon on 27 September 1813.

== Creation ==
After placing his brother Joseph on the Spanish throne in Madrid on 6 June 1808, and defeating Austria at Wagram on 6 July 1809, Napoleon had the idea of merging the two Orders of the Golden Fleece, the Spanish and the Austrian, by adding a French branch.

The Order's endowment was formed from certain estates taken from the Papal States and the mines of Idrija and its members were entitled to receive an annuity, in accordance with their ranks

- 4,000 francs for Commanders;
- 1,000 francs for Knights.

A list had already been drawn up of the members that had taken part in the great battles of the Grande Armée, commanded by the Napoleon I himself. All the work was ready, and promotions were about to begin, when Napoleon's marriage to Archduchess Marie-Louise meant that the establishment of such an order that would have upset the father-in-law prompting the project to become dormant.

The signing of the Treaty of Schönbrunn on 14 October 1809, putting an end to the Fifth Coalition, and even more so his marriage to Marie-Louise of Austria in 1810, led Napoleon to spare his father-in-law Francis I, Emperor of Austria, who was vehemently opposed to the dissolution of the Austrian branch of the Order of the Golden Fleece.

In France, Napoleon also encountered opposition from members of the Legion of Honour, who feared that their Order would be devalued.

On 27 September 1813, the Emperor decided to dissolve this stillborn order and to combine its assets with those of the Legion of Honour.

== Organisation ==
The Order was to be governed by a Council made up of:

- the Grand Master: Napoleon;
- the Grand Chancellor: Bernard-Germain de Lacépède, Grand Chancellor of the Legion of Honour since 14 August 1803 was appointed as Grand Chancellor of the Order of the Three Golden Fleeces on a provisional basis. He was then replaced on 14 October 1810 by Count Andréossy;
- the Grand Treasurer: Count Schimmelpenninck; and
- a member of the Army, the Prince of Neuchâtel and Valangin

== Ranks ==
Napoleon foresaw the creation of the following ranks:

- 100 Grand Knights;
- 400 Commanders; and
- 1000 Knights

== Members ==
The Order of the Three Golden Fleeces was intended to reward :

- The most deserving soldiers;
- The eagles surmounting the flags and standards of the regiments that took part in the eight greatest battles: Ulm, Austerlitz, Auerstaedt, Iéna, Eylau, Friedland, Eckmühl, and Wagram;
- The Princes of the Blood;
- The Grand Dignitaries of the Empire;
- The presidents of the Senate;
- Ministers; and
- Ministers of State.

According to the Duke of Reggio, the main purpose of this order was to reward long-standing military service, which had nevertheless missed the opportunity to distinguish itself through brilliant deeds.

== Eligibility criteria ==
With the exception of princes, great dignitaries of the Empire, the president of the Senate, ministers and ministers of state, the Order was only to be awarded during times of war to the most deserving soldiers.

- The Prince Imperial alone is entitled to the decoration at birth: the “Princes of the Blood” can only receive it after having completed a war campaign, or having served for two years.
- Grand dignitaries and ministers can be admitted to the Order of the Three Golden Fleeces when they have retained their portfolio for ten years;
- Ministers of State can be admitted to the Order after twenty years of practice.
- The presidents of the Senate, when they presided over the Senate for three years.
- The direct descendants of the marshals who commanded the corps of the Grande Armée may be admitted to this Order when they have distinguished themselves in the career they have undertaken.

No person other than those named above can be admitted unless they have been in war and received three wounds.

To be a Grand Knight, one must have commanded in chief, either in a pitched battle, or in a siege, or an army corps, in the Grande Armée.

A Commander's decoration will be given to the captain, lieutenant or second lieutenant of each regiment that was part of the Grande Armée, who will be designated as the bravest in the regiment.

A Knight decoration will be given to the non-commissioned officer or soldier of each of these regiments, having received at least three wounds in combat and who will also be designated as the bravest of the regiment.

However, we reserve the right to admit into the Order of the Three Golden Fleeces, the soldiers who, having not received three wounds, would have distinguished themselves either by relaxing their eagle, or by arriving first at the breach, or by passing among the first on a bridge, or who would have carried out any other noted action of brilliance.

The appointment of the Commanders or Knights of the regiments will be made by the Emperor, on the presentation which will be addressed, sealed, to the Grand Chancellor of the Order by the colonel, and concurrently by each of the battalion commanders for the infantry regiments. The Emperor will pronounce on these presentations at the meeting of the great knights of the Order, which will take place each year on 15 August, the day on which all promotions will be published.

A letter from General Compans, dated 29 September 1809, explains the principle:

The general will bring together the colonels and battalion commanders and have them separately present a captain, a lieutenant, a second lieutenant for Commander and a non-commissioned officer or soldier for Knight. These presentations will be made secretly and sealed by the colonels and battalion commanders and addressed directly to the Grand Chancellor. The general for his part will make a similar proposal without communicating, on the choice, with the colonels and battalion commanders and will send it sealed to the Grand Chancellor.

Commanders and knights could no longer leave their regiment, “and had to die under the flags”.

== Potential members ==
- In June 1811, Brigadier General François Goullus requested his admission into the Order of the Three Fleeces of Gold, and his request, favorably received, was referred to the Grand Chancellor.
- The Viscount of Ham was proposed and sworn in.

== Insignia ==
Baron Lejeune had produced a design of the badge according to Napoleon's wishes, which stipulated:

"Will be my eagle with outstretched wings, holding suspended in each of its claws one of the ancient fleeces that it has removed and it will proudly show in the air, in its beak, the fleece that I institute."

Several medalists and jewelers created models; but is manufacturer Coudray which was chosen by the Council of the Order and presented to the Emperor. Reminiscent in broad terms of the pendant of the Order of the Golden Fleece, the definitive, double-sided insignia, in gold, represented three ram suspended from a central motif comprising a blue stone from which departed on each side from orange sparks. This motif was topped by a crowned eagle with outstretched wings. The decoration had to be worn on a saltire by the Grand Knights, and on the buttonhole by the Commanders and the Knights.

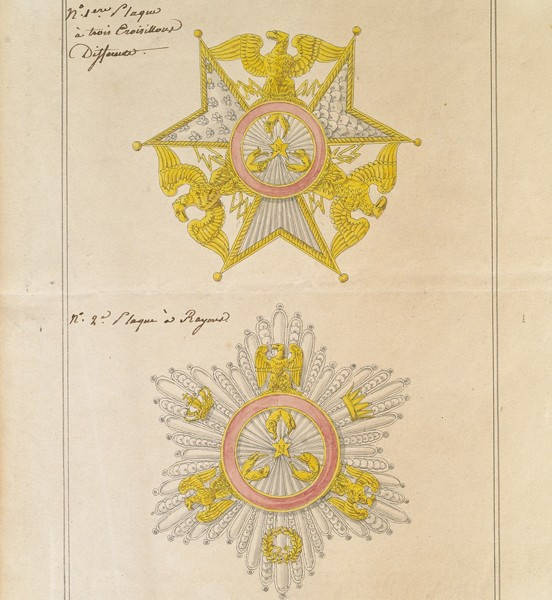
Projects for the plaque of Grand Knight of the Order of the Three Golden Fleeces, Museum of the Legion of Honor.

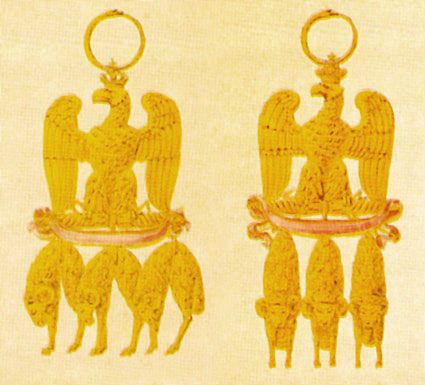
Projects for pendants of the Order of the Three Golden Fleeces

== Ribbon ==
The badge was suspended from a red ribbon with two golden stripes on each side 2 mm from the edge.

== Uniform ==
A uniform, with gold breastplate and helmet, had to be worn by members of the Order of the Three Golden Fleeces.
