= Order of the White Lady =

French knight

Boucicaut's coat of Arms

The French Marshal Jean II Le Maingre ("Boucicaut") was a knight who fought throughout Europe. Boucicaut founded the "Order of the White Lady" around 1400. Boucicaut founded the order so that the knights could support the weaker sex. Like many of the fourteenth and fifteenth century orders, this order did not exist long.

== See also ==
- Emprise de l'Escu vert à la Dame Blanche

== Sources ==
- "Libre des faits de Boucicaut" issued in 1620 by Théodore Godefroy
