= Emprise de l'Escu vert à la Dame Blanche =

French chivalric order

The Emprise de l'Escu vert à la Dame Blanche ("Enterprise of the Green Shield with the White Lady") was a chivalric order founded by Jean II Le Maingre and twelve other knights in 1399, committing themselves for the duration of five years. Inspired by the ideal of courtly love, the stated purpose of the order was to guard and defend the honor, estate, goods, reputation, fame and praise of all ladies, including widows. It was an undertaking that earned the praise of Christine de Pizan.

== Foundation ==
According to his Livre des faits, in 1399 Jean Le Maingre, tired of receiving complaints from ladies, maidens, and widows oppressed by powerful men bent on depriving them of the lands and honours, and finding no knight of squire willing to defend their just cause, out of compassion and charity founded an order of thirteen knights sworn to carry une targe d'or esmaillé de verd & tout une dame blanche dedans ("a shield of gold enamelled with green and a white lady inside"). The thirteen knights, after swearing this oath, affirmed a long letter explaining their purpose and disseminated it widely in France and beyond her borders.

The letter explained that any lady young or old de noble lignée ("of noble lineage") finding herself the victim of injustice could petition one or more or the knights de l'Écu Vert à la Dame Blanche for redress and that knight would respond promptly and leave whatever other task he was performing to fight the lady's oppressor personally. The thirteen knights promised not just this, however. They offered also to release any other knight from a vow requiring him to fight a duel before a judge. The letter was signed 11 April 1399 by Jean le Maingre, Charles d'Albret, Geffroi le Maingre, François d'Aubrecicourt, Jean de Lignères, Chambrillac, Castelbajac family, Gaucourt, Chasteaumorant, Betas, Bonnebaut, Colleville, and Torsay.

== Symbols ==
The emblem of the order was the shield of gold enamelled with green and a white lady inside. The dame blanche represented the purity which the knights of the order were to protect; what the green background signified is not so clear. That white and green were sometimes associated together in connection with the observances of May is shown by an account, in Hall's Chronicle, of a "maying" of Henry VIII of England, in which the company were clad in green on one occasion and in white on another. In Machyn's Diary, too, there is mention of a white and green Maypole around which danced a company of men and women wearing "baldrykes" of white and green.

== Literature ==
- Lalande, Denis (1988). Jean II Le Meingre, dit Boucicaut (1366–1421): étude d'une biographie héroïque.
- Marsh, George L. (1906) "Sources and Analogues of 'The Flower and the Leaf': Part I." Modern Philology, pp. 153.
- Riquer, Martín de (1967). Caballeros andantes españoles. Madrid: Editorial Espasa-Calpe.

== See also ==
- Order of the White Lady
