= Ordre du Mérite Indochinois =

Indochinese Order of Merit Ordre du Mérite indochinois Chương Mỹ Bội Tinh (彰美佩星)
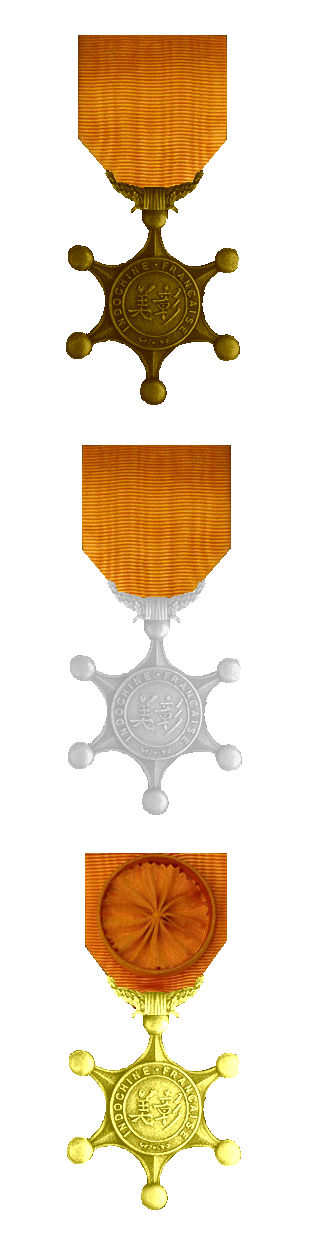
- Three classes of the order
- Type: Three-class order
- Awarded for: Services to agriculture, commerce, industry and art
- Country: French Indochina
- Presented by: Governor-General of Indochina
- Eligibility: Local population of French Indochina
- Motto: Il est de développer les méritant connaissances (It is worthy to develop knowledge)
- Status: abolished
- Established: 30 April 1900
- Ribbon bar of the award

The Ordre du Mérite indochinois (Indochinese Order of Merit) was a regional award of France awarded by the Governor-General of Indochina for the local population of French Indochina.

== History ==
Established April 30, 1900 by Governor-General of French Indochina Paul Doumer the order was to reward the local population of Indo-China for services to agriculture, commerce, industry and art. This award had no status as an official French colonial award but was a local only award for the population of Laos, Cambodia, Tonkin, Cochin China, and Annam. Governed by an Order Council, it was divided into three classes with limit on the number of members for each class. The 3rd class, was limited to 500 members. The 2nd Class, was limited to 100 members. The 1st class, was limited to 15 members.

== Description ==
The badge of the order is a ball tipped six-pointed star with concave sides. In the center of the star is a round rimmed medallion. In the center of the medallion is the inscription in Annamese ideographic writing "It is worthy to develop knowledge" (彰美, written from right-to-left). On the rim is the inscription INDOCHINE FRANCAISE (French Indochina). Attached to the ball of the top most arm of the star are two laurel branches, which act as a ring to attach the star to its ribbon. The ribbon of the order is yellow Moire silk. The Order was presented in the 1st degree in gold, 2nd degree silver, and third degree bronze.
