= National Order of Labour (France) =

Vichy French Order of Merit

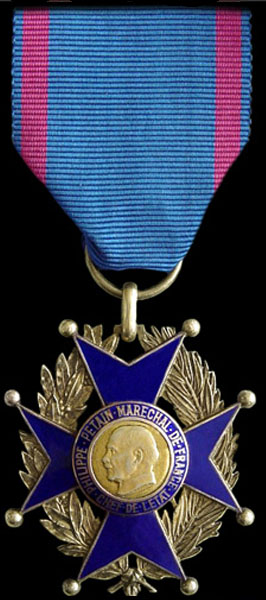
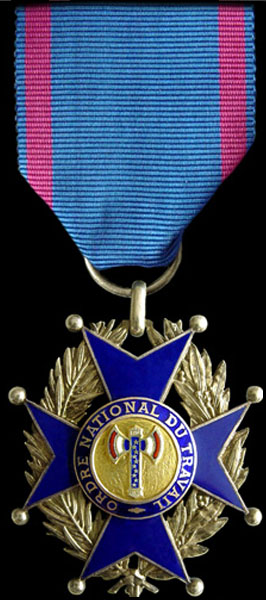
- Awarded for: Merit in Labour
- Country: Vichy France
- Status: Abolished
- Established: 1 April, 1942
- First award: 1 May 1943
- Final award: 1 May, 1944

Highlights
- Total recipients: 200

The National Order of Labour was an order of merit established by the French State to reward meritorious labour by civilians.

== History ==
The National Order of Labour was instituted on 1 April, 1942 by the Head of the French State, Philippe Pétain. The order was composed of three grades: Knight, Officer, and Commander. The order was to be awarded sequentially, similarly to the Legion of Honour. The criteria were as follows: 10 years of professional experience, special professional skills, excellent social behaviour or special services rendered to the profession and to the French nation. In addition, the recipient had to be at least 35 years old. The only grade awarded was that of Knight, as the statutes required six years of seniority in the grade of Knight to be awarded the grade of Officer, and the same period again was required for the bestowal of Commander.

After the Liberation of France, the new Provisional Government of the French Republic, led by Charles de Gaulle, abolished the order along with all other Vichy decorations.

== Appearance ==
Decree No. 1055 of 16 April 1943 set out the appearance of the order: "The decoration of the National Order of Labour is a four-pointed cross in blue enamelled silver, resting on a crown of palm and laurel in gilt; the centre, in gilt, represents the effigy of the Marshal-Head of State, and bears as a legend "Phillipe Pétain, Marechal de France, Chef de l'Etat"; on the reverse is the Gallic Francisque and the legend, "Ordre National du Travail".

The ribbon is French blue with a red border, 5 mm wide, 1 mm from the edges.

=== Knight ===
The Knight's Cross measures 44 mm in height and 38 mm in width, and hangs from a ribbon 37 mm wide.

=== Officer ===
The officer's cross measures 44 mm in height and 38 mm in width, and is suspended from a 37 mm wide ribbon with a 28 mm rosette.

=== Commander ===
The Commander's Cross measures 66 mm in height and 57 mm in width, and hangs from a 40 mm wide necklet.

== Council of the Order ==
The members of the Council of the Order were appointed for a renewable period of four years by the Minister of Justice.

== Nomination ==
Any French citizen could apply to join the Order; applications were presented to junior ministers of departments, who would then record the candidate's professional activities. Subsequently, the recommendation would be sent to the Minister of State for Labour. The final opinion will be given by the head of the French State.

== See also ==
- Orders, decorations, and medals of France
- Ribbons of the French military and civil awards
