= Gustav Adolph Ackermann =

German lawyer (1791–1872)

Gustav Adolph Ackermann, painted by Egon Josef Kossuth, 1934)

Gustav Adolph Ackermann (1791–1872) was a German lawyer and author of a book on European knightly orders.

== Biography ==
Ackermann was born in Auerbach in Vogtland, Electorate of Saxony, Holy Roman Empire on 16 January 1791. He was Königlich Sachsischer Appelationsrat, 'Royal Saxon appeal councillor' at the courthouse in Dresden, Saxony and a connoisseur of 19th century and medieval German and European knightly orders; Ackermann was himself a Knight of the Albert Order.

In 1855 his Ordensbuch, 'Orders book' appeared in Annaberg with the subtitle Sämtlicher in Europa blühender und erloschener Orden und Ehrenzeichen, 'Complete gathering of flourishing and extinct orders and honorific decorations in Europe'. Despite its title, the book is not a complete description of orders and decorations, but it is a valuable resource for researchers.

As a lawyer he also published in his field. In 1849 his Rechtssätze aus Erkenntnissen des Königl. Oberappelationsgerichts zu Dresden, 'Law sets about findings of royal high appeal court in Dresden', a work on the then applicable jurisprudence, appeared in Saxony. He died in Dresden on 19 February 1872.

== Selected works ==
- Ackermann, Gustav Adolph (1855). Ordensbuch sämtlicher in Europa blühender und erloschener Orden und Ehrenzeichen. Annaberg: Rudolph & Dieterici.
