= Order of Saint Michael =

French dynastic order of chivalry, founded by King Louis XI in 1469

Order of Saint Michael Ordre de Saint-Michel
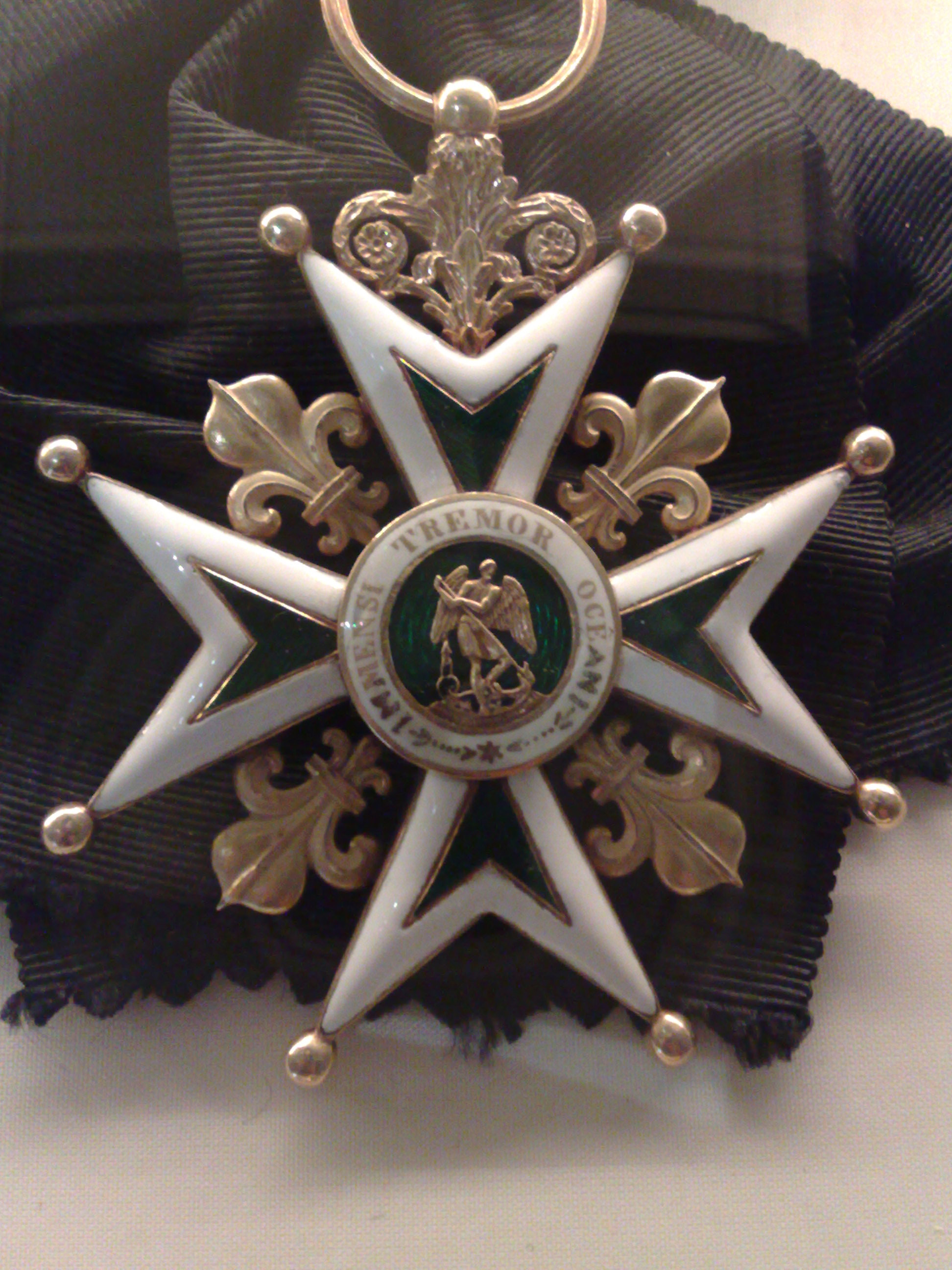
- Badge of the Order

Awarded by the (Kingdom of France) King of France
- Type: Dynastic order
- Established: 1 August 1469
- Royal house: House of France
- Religious affiliation: Roman Catholicism
- Ribbon: Black
- Motto: Latin: Immensi tremor oceani
- Status: Abolished by decree of Louis XVI on 20 June 1790; Reestablished by Louis XVIII on 16 November 1816; Abolished in 1830 after the July Revolution; Recognised as a dynastic order of chivalry by the ICOC
- Founder: Louis XI

Precedence
- Next (higher): Order of the Holy Spirit
- Next (lower): Order of Saint Louis
- Ribbon of the Order

The Order of Saint Michael (French: Ordre de Saint-Michel) is a French dynastic order of chivalry, founded by King Louis XI on 1 August 1469, in response to the Order of the Golden Fleece founded by Philip the Good, Duke of Burgundy, Louis' chief competitor for the allegiance of the great houses of France, the dukes of Orléans, Berry, and Brittany. As a chivalric order, its goal was to confirm the loyalty of its knights to the king. Originally, there were a limited number of knights, at first thirty-one, then increased to thirty-six including the king. An office of Provost was established in 1476. The Order of St Michael was the highest Order in France until it was superseded by the Order of the Holy Spirit.

Although officially abolished by the government authorities of the July Revolution in 1830 following the French Revolution, its activities carried on. It is still recognised by the International Commission on Orders of Chivalry.

== History ==
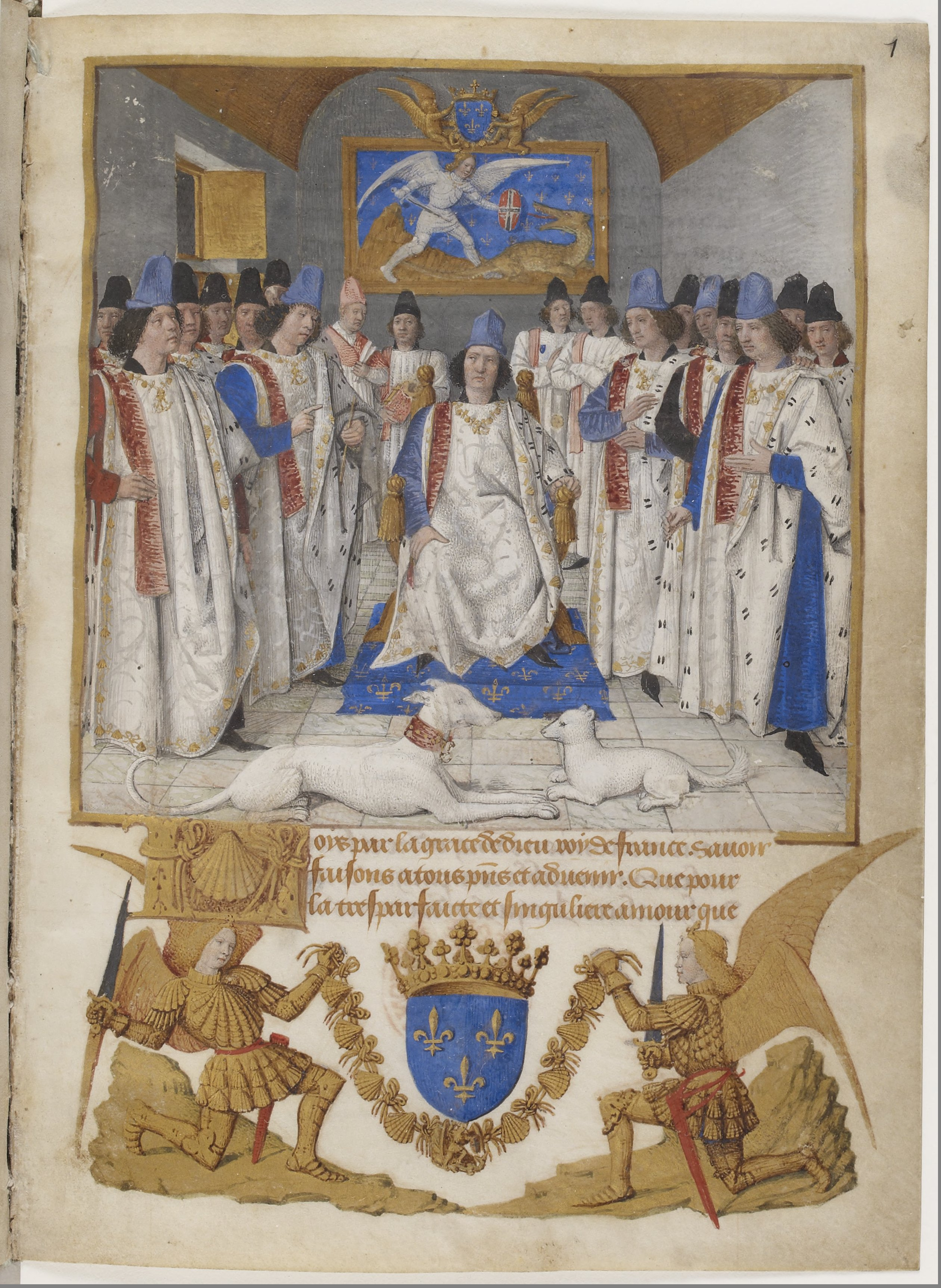
King Louis XI sitting on his throne. In the room, a painting of St. Michael killing a serpent. Title page of the Order's statutes, drawn by Jean Fouquet in the 15th century. Bibliothèque Nationale, fr. 19819

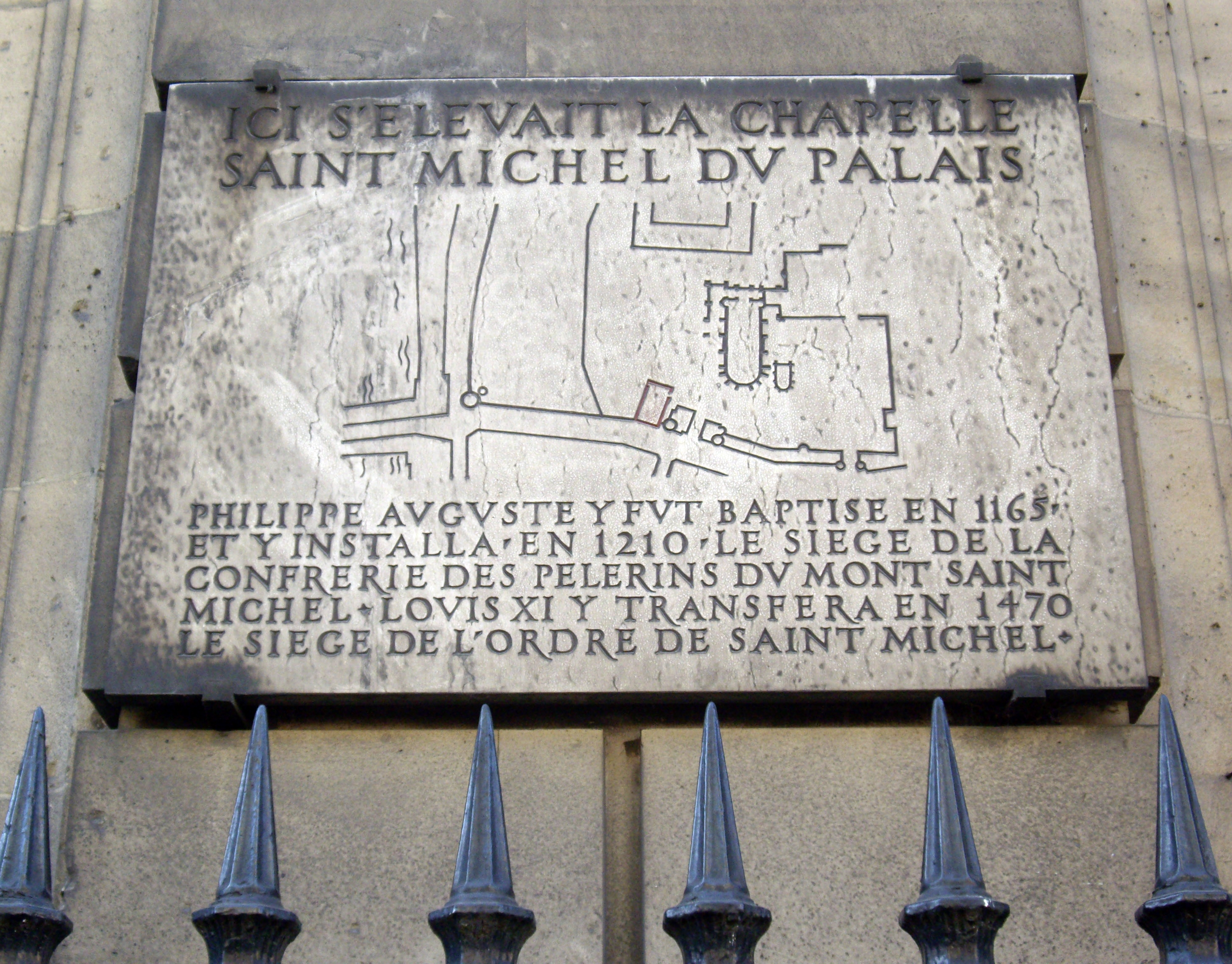
Plaque marking the former site of the Chapel of Saint-Michel du Palais, home of the Order from 1496 to 1555

The first knights were among the most powerful nobles in France, close relatives of the king and a few from other royal houses in Europe. Originally, the number of members (called companions) was limited to thirty-five. In 1565, during the Wars of Religion, when loyalties were strained and essential, Charles IX increased the membership to fifty, but there may have been as many as seven hundred knights under Henry III in 1574.

The Order of St. Michael dedicated to the Archangel Michael conveyed to every member a gold badge of the image of the saint standing on a rock (Mont Saint-Michel) in combat with the serpent. The motto of the order was "immensi tremor oceani" (meaning "The tremor of the immense ocean"), derived from the idea of Saint Michael looking out over the Atlantic from Mont Saint-Michel. It was suspended from the elaborate Collar of the Order of Saint Michael made of scallop shells (the badge of pilgrims, especially those to Santiago de Compostela) linked with double knots. The statutes state that the badge could be hung on a simple chain, and later it was suspended from a black ribbon.

When the Order of St Michael was founded, the famous illuminator Jean Fouquet was commissioned to paint the title miniature of the Statutes, showing the king presiding over the knights (Paris, Bibliothèque Nationale, fr. 19819). The original plan was for the knights to meet yearly on 29 September at Mont Saint-Michel in Normandy. Such an isolated location was impractical causing Charles VIII to transfer this meeting place to the chapel of Saint-Michel-du-Palais, part of Paris' medieval royal residence the Palais de la Cité which the kings no longer used, to the control of the order in 1496. By letters patent dated 15 August 1555, the seat of the Order was transferred to the royal Château de Vincennes outside Paris.

The Order of St. Michael was abolished by Louis XVI, under pressures from the revolutionaries, on 20 June 1790. It was abolished along with all other chivalric orders of the Ancien Régime, although the exiled Louis XVIII continued to acknowledge it. Following the Bourbon Restoration, the order was officially revived by the late king's brother on 16 November 1816 but the new king (or his governments who made suggestions of whom may have been fit to be invested of it) took little interest in the order and no new knights were added after 1816. The Order was again abolished by the French authorities in 1830, following the July Revolution.

The French government considers the Order to be the origin of the Ordre des Arts et des Lettres:

Saint-Michel Order (1460–1830) can be considered as the precursor of the Order of the Arts and Letters. Originally destined to the aristocracy, from 17th to 18th centuries it became an order of civil merit, which distinguished many artists, architects, collectors, and people of letters

== Notable recipients ==
No formal list of members of the order exists. The names of members can be gleaned from reference to their receipt of the order, from secondary sources, or from periodic lists compiled showing companions from particular families or regions.

=== Initial cohort ===
The first fifteen knights, men of "good sense, valiance, wisdom and other great and laudable virtues" (bon sens, vaillance, prud'hommie et autres grandes et louables vertus) were appointed by Louis XI and tasked to select, jointly with the king himself, the next ones to complete the first group of thirty-six:

- Charles, Duke of Guyenne
- John II, Duke of Bourbon
- Louis of Luxembourg, Constable of France
- André de Laval, Marshal of France
- Jean V de Bueil, Count of Sancerre
- Louis de Beaumont, lord of La Forêt and Le Plessis
- Jean d'Estouteville, lord of Torcy
- Louis de Laval, lord of Châtillon
- Louis de Bourbon-Roussillon, Count of Roussillon, Admiral of France
- Antoine de Chabannes, Count of Dammartin, Grand Master of the Hotel of France
- Jean d'Armagnac, Count of Comminges, Marshal of France
- Georges II de La Trémoille, lord of Craon
- Gilbert de Chabannes, lord of Curton, Seneschal of Guyenne
- Louis Bastet de Crussol, Seneschal of Poitou
- Tanneguy du Châtel, Governor of Roussillon and Cerdagne

=== Later appointees ===
- Samson de Saint-Germain, Baron of Asnebec, Baron of Ranes, Lord of Rouvrou, la Fresnaye and Saint-Georges, in 1469 by Louis XI
- Cesare Borgia, in 1499 by Louis XII
- Francesco II Gonzaga of Mantua in 1507 by Louis XII
- Thomas Howard, 3rd Duke of Norfolk, in 1532 by Francis I
- James V of Scotland, in 1534 by Francis I
- Archibald Douglas, 6th Earl of Angus in 1545 by Francis I
- James Hamilton, Duke of Châtellerault in 1548 by Henry II
- George Gordon, 4th Earl of Huntly in 1548 by Henry II
- Archibald Campbell, 5th Earl of Argyll in 1548 by Henry II
- Paul de Thermes in 1549 (for the capture of Haddington and Broughty Castle)
- André de Montalembert in 1549 (for the capture of Inchkeith)
- Edward VI of England, 1551 by Henry II
- Henry Stewart, Lord Darnley under the name King Henry of Scotland, 1565 by Charles IX
- Robert Dudley, 1st Earl of Leicester, 1566 by Charles IX
- Thomas Howard, 4th Duke of Norfolk, 1566 by Charles IX
- Michiel de Ruyter, in 1666 by Louis XIV
- François Caron, in 1672 by Louis XIV
- Constance Phaulkon, in 1687 by Louis XIV

== Gallery ==
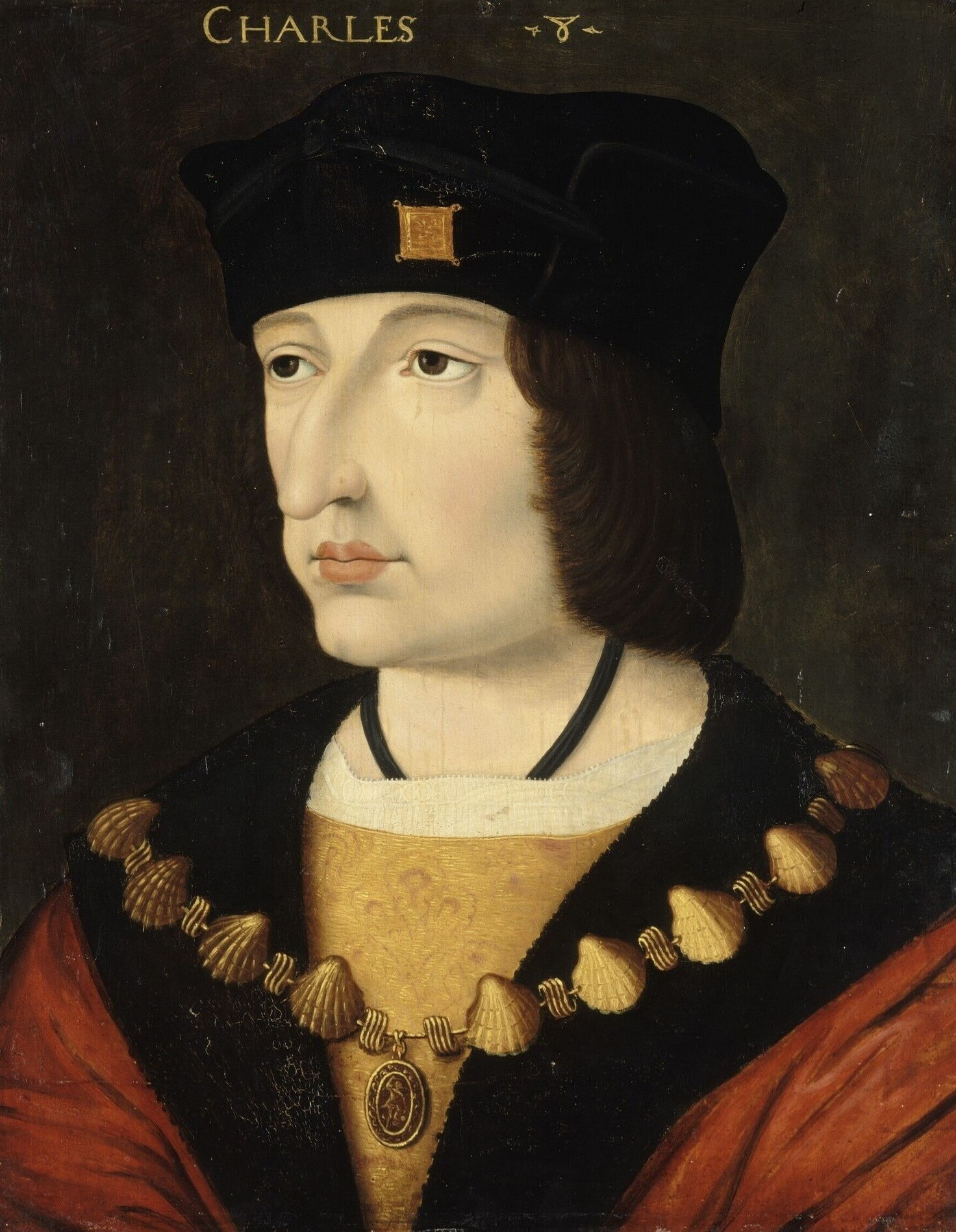
Charles VIII, son of Louis XI, wearing the collar of the Order of Saint Michael

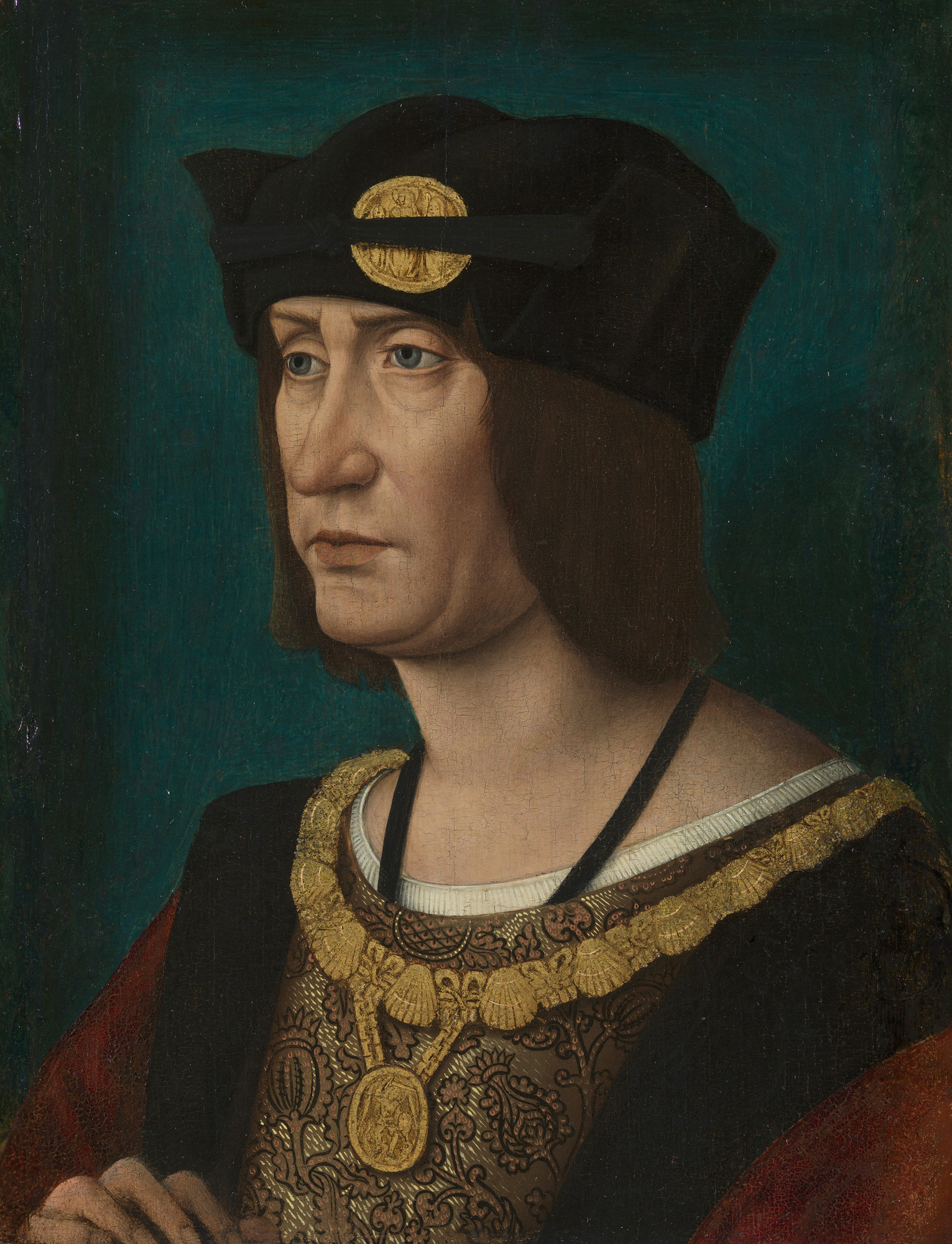
Louis XII wearing the collar of the Order

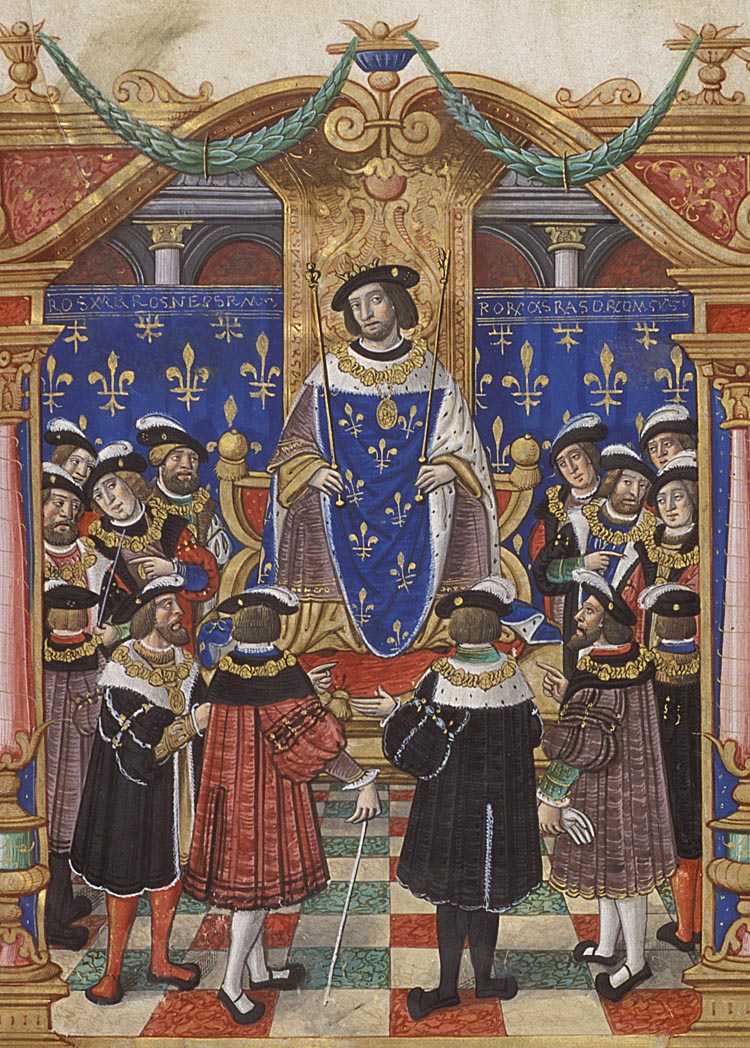
King Francis I presiding the Order's knights. Painting from a copy of the statutes from about 1530.

Collar of the Order as used on the Royal Arms of France
