= Louis II de Beaumont-Bressuire =

Louis II de Beaumont-Bressuire also known as Louis II of Beaumont - also known as Louis de Beaumont, and also known as Louis of the Forest, (1407-1477), was a French Knight and Lord of Bressuire, the Plessis-Macé, and of Missé, and Commequiers, He was also Chamberlain of Louis XI. He also was the brother of André de Beaumont, grand master of Crossbowmen of France.

== Early life ==
Born in 1407, Louis II de Beaumont-Bressuire was the great-grandson of Louis I de Beaumont-Bressuire and the son of Charles de Beaumont and Anne de Curton.

In 1440, he married Jeanne, Dame de la Forêt et de Commequiers and they had three children, Thibaut (Taylor), Catherine and Louis de Beaumont forest, Bishop of Paris from 1473-1492. He was the uncle of Jacques de Beaumont, also a Chamberlain of Louis XI.

== Military career ==
Louis II de Beaumont - Bressuire, became famous under Charles VII in the Hundred Years' War. He played an important role in Guyenne, and took Gensac in Dordogne, participated in the Battle of Castillon. He took part in 1453 at the capture of Bordeaux. He was among those who negotiated the surrender.

In 1469, Louis XI created the order of Saint-Michel and appointed the first fifteen Knights among which we find Louis de Beaumont. In 1469, Louis de Beaumont-Bressuire was one of his 12 confidants who accompanied King Louis XI, during his interview with his brother Charles, Duke of Guyenne in Coulonges-les-Royal in September 1469.

== Buildings ==
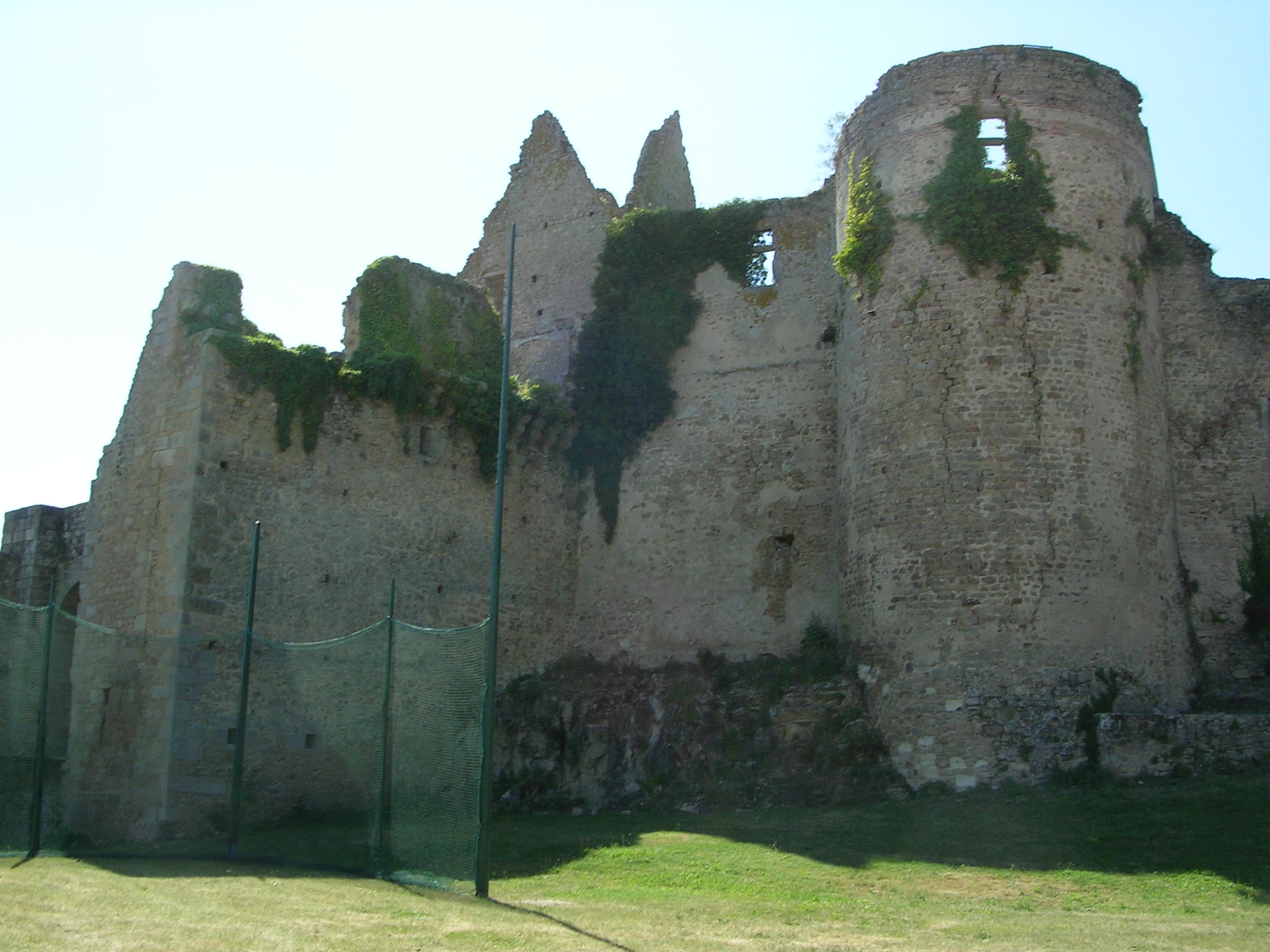
Louis undertook numerous building projects:

- In 1441, he transformed the Château de Bressuire (pictured) into a princely residence.
- In 1472 Louis de Beaumont, Lord of the forest-sur-Sèvre and Misse, built a hunting lodge in Missé, that repeatedly was visited by Louis XI.
- In 1475, he completed the restoration of the castle of Plessis-Macé in Anjou.
