= Collar of the Order of Saint Michael =

Prestigious insignia to the knights of the Order of Saint Michael

- Grand Collier de l'Ordre de Saint Michel
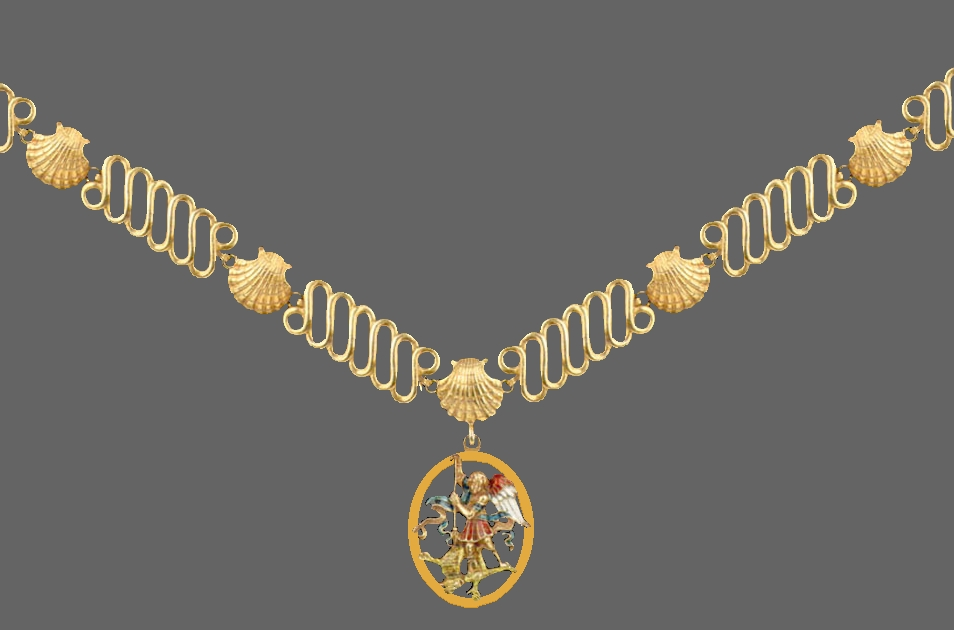
- Symbols: Saint Michael the Archangel; Shell of Saint James
- Created: 1469
- Period/culture: 1469-1830
- Present location: Rijksmuseum; Chancellery of the Dutch orders of the Palace of Het Loo; Musée de la Légion d'honneur
- Culture: Kingdom of France

The collar of the Order of Saint Michael is a chivalric collar which was attributed as the most prestigious insignia to the knights of the Order of Saint Michael until 1830. This collar is now extremely rare. Only three are now known to exist, all of which would have been awarded to Dutch notables in the years 1650–1660 as a sign of appreciation for their faithfulness during the Thirty Years' War.

== History ==
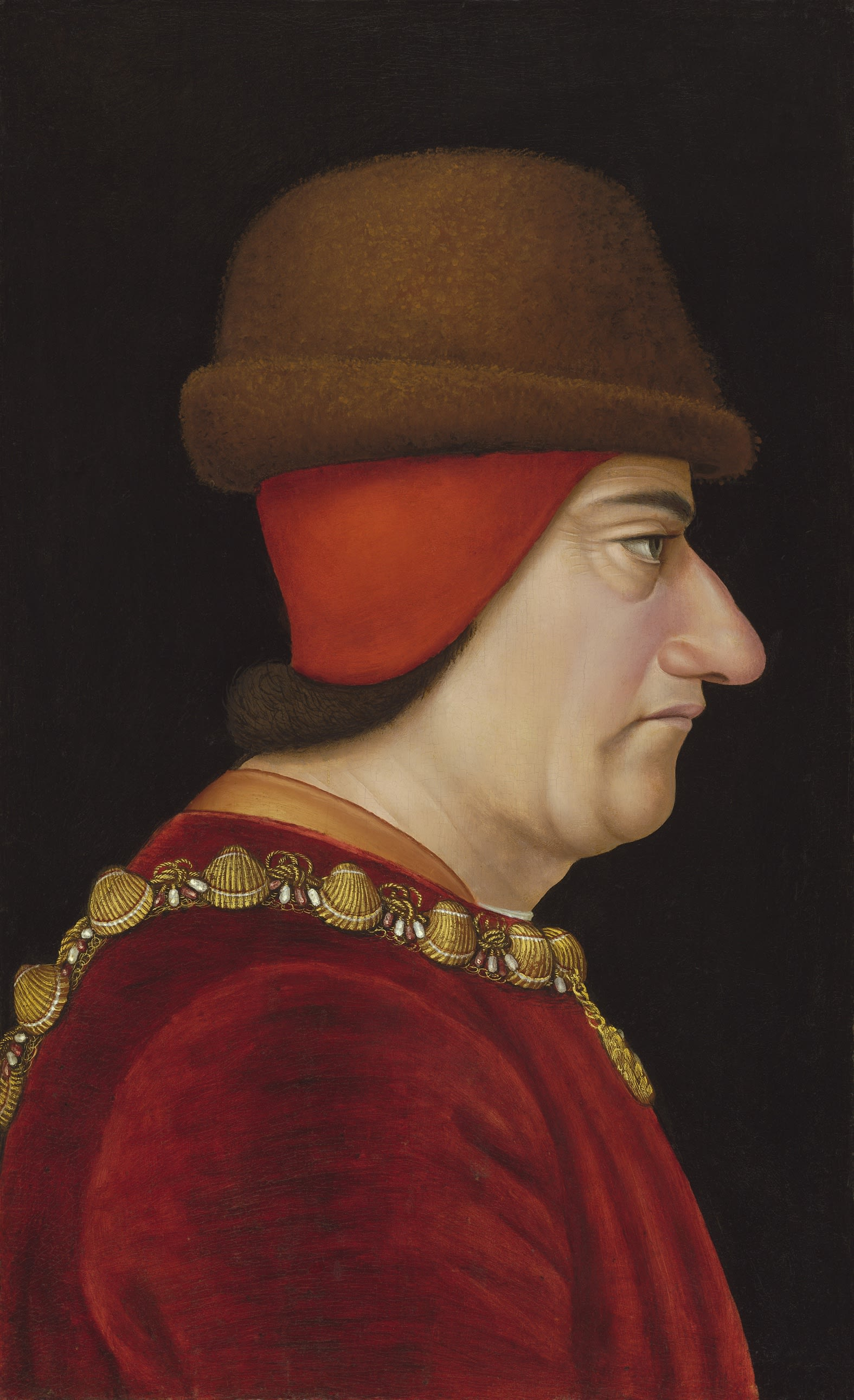
Louis XI wearing the Golden Collar of the Order of Saint Michael, c. 1469, in what may be the earliest depiction of the collar.

The collar of the Order of St. Michael was probably made in imitation of the Collar of the Order of the Golden Fleece. In fact, the Order of St. Michael was created by Louis XI, on August 1, 1469, to counter the importance of the Duke of Burgundy, whose order of the Golden Fleece was conferred on many European princes.

During the wars of religion, the order was awarded perhaps too generously and consequently lost its prestige. It became the second royal order when the Order of the Holy Spirit was created on December 31, 1578. Reformed by Louis XIV, it disappeared definitively in 1830.

When the Order of Liberation claimed itself to be the continuation of the Order of Saint Michael, it imitated the collar of Saint Michael, replacing the shells and image of Saint Michael with the Cross of Lorraine.

== Description ==
The collar of the Order of Saint Michael consists of twelve enamelled gold scallop shells, connected by artistic interlace. The pendant, attached by a double gold chain, represents Saint Michael slaying the devil.

It was painted for the first time as being worn by King Louis XI and the painting was kept at his castle in Fontainebleau.

In the 1730s, it was printed for the first time as worn during the first chapter of the order of Saint Michael in Les monuments de la monarchie française by Bernard de Montfaucon.

== Location ==
Only three collars of the Order of Saint Michael are authenticated in the present day. Two of them are preserved in the Netherlands, one in the Rijksmuseum, and the other in the museum of the Chancellery of the Dutch orders of the Palace of Het Loo. The third is on deposit at the Musée de la Légion d'honneur in Paris.

== See also ==
- Collar (order)
- Collar day
- Livery collar
