= Guillaume Rouger =

French footballer (born 1975)

Personal information
- Full name: Guillaume Rouger
- Date of birth: October 21, 1975 (age 51)
- Place of birth: Bressuire, France
- Height: 1.75 m (5 ft 9 in)
- Position: Striker

Senior career*
Years	Team	Apps	(Gls)
1995–1997	Chamois Niortais	1	(0)
1997–1998	Réthaise	?	(?)
1998–1999	Châtellerault	4	(0)
- * Club domestic league appearances and goals

Guillaume Rouger (born October 21, 1975) is a retired professional footballer. He played as a striker.

== See also ==
- Football in France
- List of football clubs in France
