= Château de Bressuire =

Ruined castle in Nouvelle-Aquitaine, France

Coordinates: 46°50′30″N 0°29′56″W

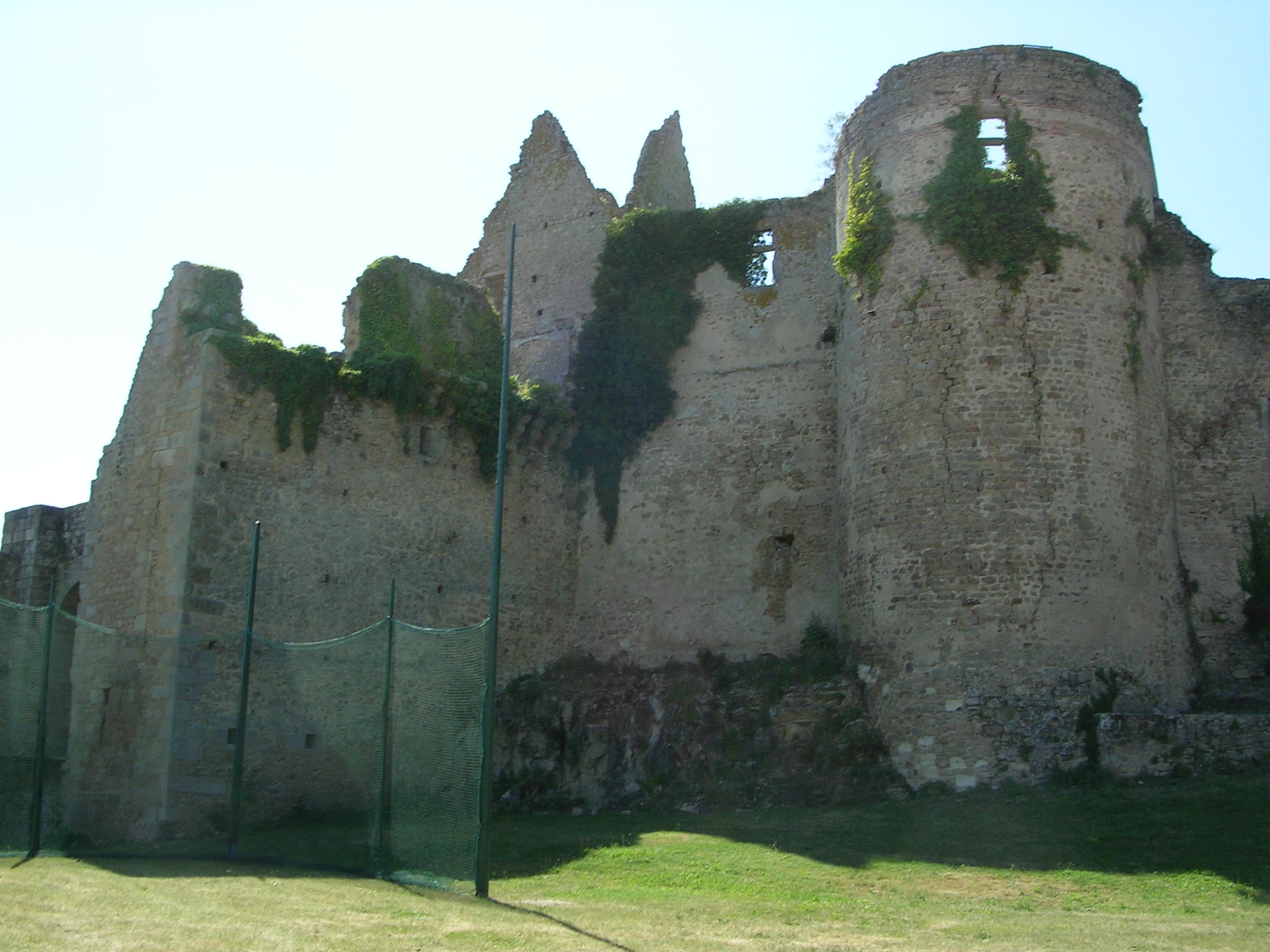
Chateau de Bressuire

The Château de Bressuire is a ruined castle in the town of Bressuire in the Deux-Sèvres département of France.

The site has been inhabited continuously since the Celtic epoch. The castle was built on the site of an oppidum of the Gauls and was first documented in 1029, in a charter at Saint-Cyprien de Poitiers. It belonged to the Beaumont-Bressuire family until the start of the 16th century.

The castle is a fine example of medieval military architecture. In 1190, the castle consisted of an enceinte almost 700 metres around, with 38 towers circling the first fortress, itself defended by eight towers.

The visible remains date essentially from the end of the 12th and the start of the 13th century. The fortress included three enceintes, of which the outermost has now disappeared. The castle was broken up during the first half of the 18th century.

In 1441, Jacques de Beaumont became Seigneur de Bressuire. He converted the castle into a beautiful residence. From this time date the large building closing off the courtyard, that has mullion windows, splendid granite chimneys in the private rooms and an elegant gallery, all intended to show the refinement of the owner. The castle subsequently belonged to a number of families but its maintenance was ignored. In 1876, the building partly collapsed. The Bernard family bought the castle the same year. In 1880, a neo-Gothic château was built in the castle court, set back in relation to the former building.

The castle was acquired by the commune in 1975. It has been listed since 1996 as a monument historique by the French Ministry of Culture.

== See also ==
- List of castles in France
- Louis II de Beaumont-Bressuire
