= Bressuire =

- Subprefecture and commune
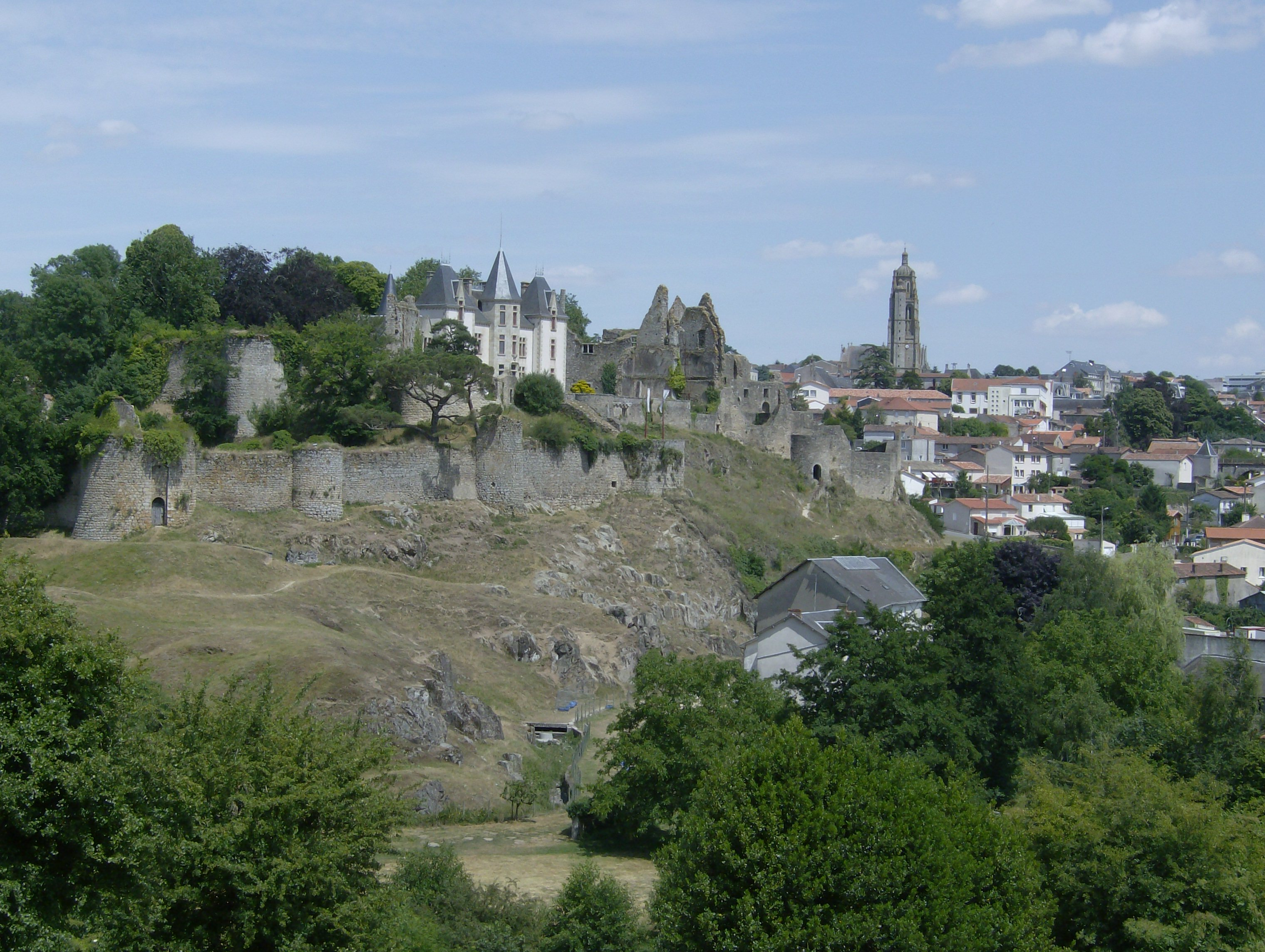
- Château de Bressuire and the Eglise Notre-Dame

- Coat of arms
- Location of Bressuire
- Location within France Location within Nouvelle-Aquitaine
- Coordinates: 46°50′27″N 0°29′14″W
- Country: France
- Region: Nouvelle-Aquitaine
- Department: Deux-Sèvres
- Arrondissement: Bressuire
- Canton: Bressuire
- Intercommunality: CA Bocage Bressuirais

Government
  - Mayor (2020–2026): Emmanuelle Ménard
- Area^{1}: 180.59 km^{2} (69.73 sq mi)
- Elevation: 173 m (568 ft)
- Highest elevation: 236 m (774 ft)
- Lowest elevation: 98 m (322 ft)
- Population (2023): 19,970
  - Density: 110.6/km^{2} (286.4/sq mi)
- Time zone: UTC+01:00 (CET)
  - Summer (DST): UTC+02:00 (CEST)
- INSEE/Postal code: 79049 /79300
- ^{1} French Land Register data, which excludes lakes, ponds, glaciers > 1 km^{2} (0.386 sq mi or 247 acres) and river estuaries.

Bressuire (French pronunciation: [bʁɛsɥiʁ]; Latin: Berceorium; Poitevin: Beurseure) is a commune in the French department of Deux-Sèvres, region of Nouvelle-Aquitaine. The town is situated on an eminence overlooking the Dolo, a tributary of the Argenton.

== Notable buildings ==
Bressuire has two buildings of interest: the church of Notre-Dame, which, dating chiefly from the 12th and 15th centuries, has an imposing tower of the Renaissance period; and the castle, built by the lords of Beaumont, vassals of the viscount of Thouars. The latter is now in ruins, and a portion of the site is occupied by a modern château, but an inner and outer line of fortifications are still to be seen. The whole forms the finest assemblage of feudal ruins in Poitou.

== The name ==
The name "Bressuire" comes from two elements, being Berg (hill) and Durum (fortress). These two are linked in the name "Berzoriacum" recorded in 1029, and "Bercorium" from the start of the crusading era in 1095. The name Bressuire thereby defines a fortress on a hill.

== History ==
Bressuire dates back to Celtic times, and was at the meeting point of roads during the Gallo-Roman period. The earliest surviving evidence of the town's existence, around the chapel of Saint Cyprien, dates back to the eleventh century.

Medieval Bressuire ("Castrum Berzoriacum") belonged to the viscounts of Thouars and comprised, in the tenth century, the three parishes of Notre Dame (Our Lady), St John and St Nicholas. The parish of St Nicholas, which has since disappeared, was located within the walls of the castle and belonged to the Abbey of Saint-Jouin-de-Marnes.

Among the disasters suffered at various times by the town, its capture from the English and subsequent pillage by French troops under du Guesclin in 1370 is the most memorable. Bressuire was part of the Ancien Régime Province of Poitou.

In January 1973 Bressuire absorbed the former communes Beaulieu-sous-Bressuire, Boismé, Breuil-Chaussée, Chambroutet, Clazay, Noirlieu, Noirterre, Saint-Sauveur-de-Givre-en-Mai and Terves.

== Population ==
Population data refer to the area corresponding with the commune as of January 2025.

Historical population
Year	Pop.	±% p.a.
1968	13,814	—
1975	16,101	+2.21%
1982	17,366	+1.09%
1990	17,827	+0.33%
1999	17,799	−0.02%
2007	18,436	+0.44%
2012	18,966	+0.57%
2017	19,519	+0.58%
2023	19,970	+0.38%
Source: INSEE

== Notable people ==
- Guillaume Rouger (born 1975), retired professional footballer

== Twin towns – sister cities ==
Bressuire is twinned with:

- Fraserburgh, Scotland, United Kingdom
- Friedberg, Germany
- Hodac, Romania
- Kpalimé, Togo
- (Republic of Ireland) Leixlip, Ireland
- Mequinenza, Spain
- Parczew, Poland
- Ryazan, Russia
- Arica, Chile

== Climate ==
Climate data for Bressuire (1991–2020 normals, extremes 1990–present)
Month	Jan	Feb	Mar	Apr	May	Jun	Jul	Aug	Sep	Oct	Nov	Dec	Year
Record high °C (°F)	16.5 (61.7)	22.1 (71.8)	23.9 (75.0)	27.8 (82.0)	32.1 (89.8)	38.9 (102.0)	40.4 (104.7)	39.9 (103.8)	34.2 (93.6)	30.4 (86.7)	22.1 (71.8)	17.7 (63.9)	40.4 (104.7)
Mean daily maximum °C (°F)	7.9 (46.2)	9.0 (48.2)	12.6 (54.7)	15.6 (60.1)	19.6 (67.3)	23.4 (74.1)	25.9 (78.6)	26.0 (78.8)	22.1 (71.8)	16.9 (62.4)	11.6 (52.9)	8.5 (47.3)	16.6 (61.9)
Daily mean °C (°F)	5.2 (41.4)	5.5 (41.9)	8.2 (46.8)	10.5 (50.9)	14.2 (57.6)	17.7 (63.9)	19.7 (67.5)	19.8 (67.6)	16.4 (61.5)	12.9 (55.2)	8.4 (47.1)	5.7 (42.3)	12.0 (53.6)
Mean daily minimum °C (°F)	2.4 (36.3)	2.0 (35.6)	3.8 (38.8)	5.4 (41.7)	8.8 (47.8)	11.9 (53.4)	13.6 (56.5)	13.5 (56.3)	10.8 (51.4)	8.9 (48.0)	5.2 (41.4)	2.8 (37.0)	7.4 (45.3)
Record low °C (°F)	−12.1 (10.2)	−11.2 (11.8)	−11.7 (10.9)	−4.3 (24.3)	−0.7 (30.7)	3.2 (37.8)	5.9 (42.6)	5.4 (41.7)	2.5 (36.5)	−3.1 (26.4)	−7.4 (18.7)	−10.6 (12.9)	−12.1 (10.2)
Average precipitation mm (inches)	92.1 (3.63)	67.6 (2.66)	64.6 (2.54)	63.5 (2.50)	67.3 (2.65)	52.3 (2.06)	51.1 (2.01)	51.1 (2.01)	58.5 (2.30)	97.1 (3.82)	89.1 (3.51)	97.9 (3.85)	852.2 (33.55)
Average precipitation days (≥ 1.0 mm)	13.0	10.9	10.3	10.2	10.3	7.8	7.4	7.1	7.8	11.7	13.1	13.2	122.8
Source: Meteociel

== See also ==
- Communes of the Deux-Sèvres department
